= Survivor: Cook Islands =

- Season 13
- Presented by: Jeff Probst
- No. of days: 39
- No. of castaways: 20
- Winner: Yul Kwon
- Runner-up: Ozzy Lusth
- Location: Aitutaki, Cook Islands
- No. of episodes: 16

Release
- Original network: CBS
- Original release: September 14 – December 17, 2006

Additional information
- Filming dates: June 26 – August 3, 2006

Season chronology
- ← Previous; Panama — Exile Island Next → Fiji

Survivor: Cook Islands is the thirteenth season of the American competitive reality television series, Survivor. The season was filmed from June 26 to August 3, 2006, and premiered on September 14 of that year. Filmed in the Cook Islands, it was broadcast by CBS.

The season had 20 contestants who were initially divided into four "tribes" by ethnicity: African American, Asian American, Latino, and Caucasian. The tribes were named after some of the Cook Islands: Manihiki, Pukapuka, Aitutaki, and Rarotonga, respectively. They were later merged into a single tribe, Aitutonga. The season was the first with a final consisting of three participants, rather than two. Yul Kwon defeated Ozzy Lusth and Becky Lee by a jury vote of 5–4–0 and was named the Sole Survivor, winning $1,000,000.

== Format ==
Survivor is a reality television show based on the Swedish show Expedition Robinson, created by Mark Burnett and Charlie Parsons. The series follows a number of participants isolated in a remote location, where they must provide food, fire, and shelter. One participant is removed from the series by majority vote every three days, with challenges held to give a reward (ranging from living- and food-related prizes to a car) and immunity from being voted out of the series. The last remaining player receives a prize of $1,000,000.

== Contestants ==
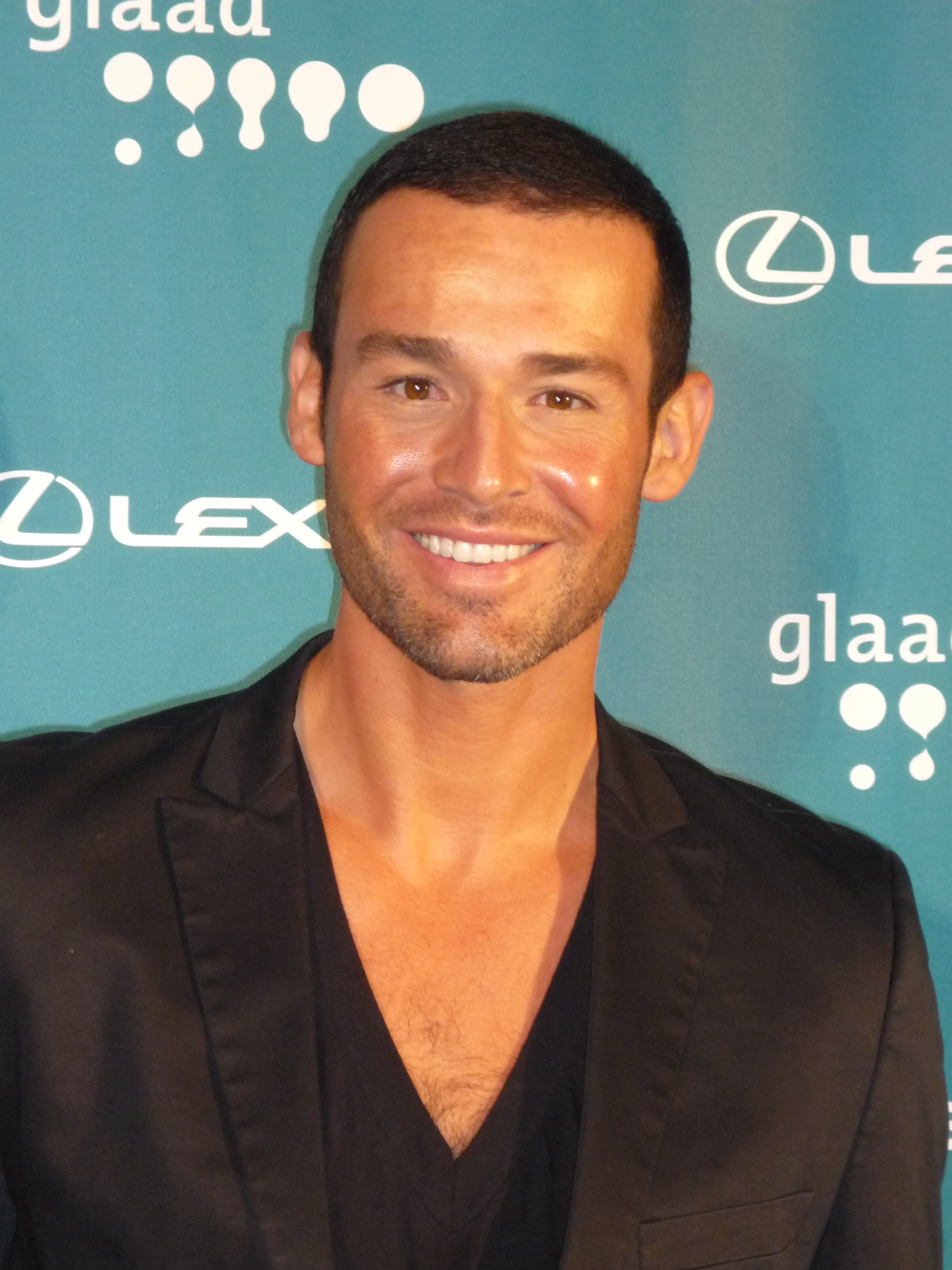
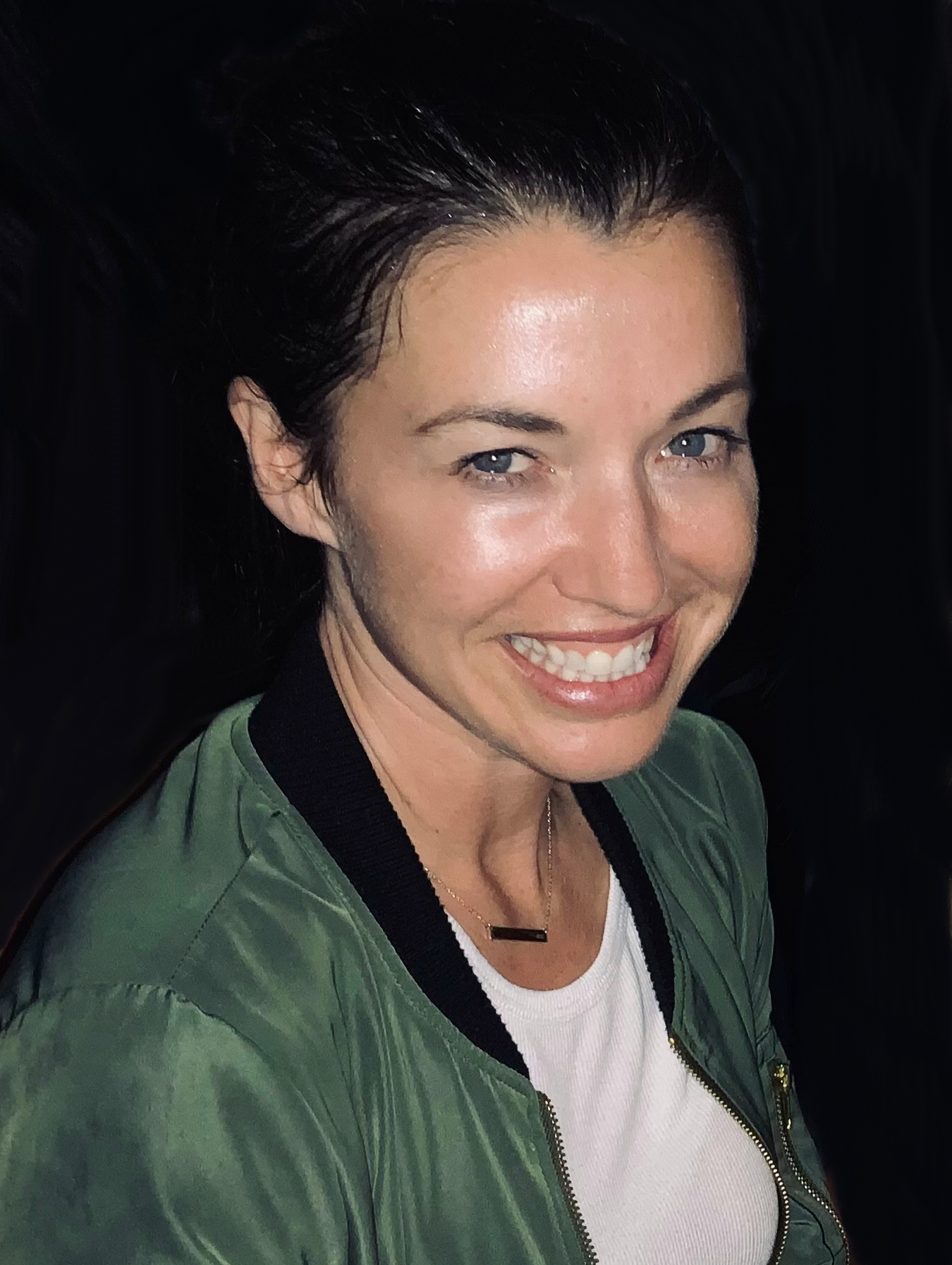
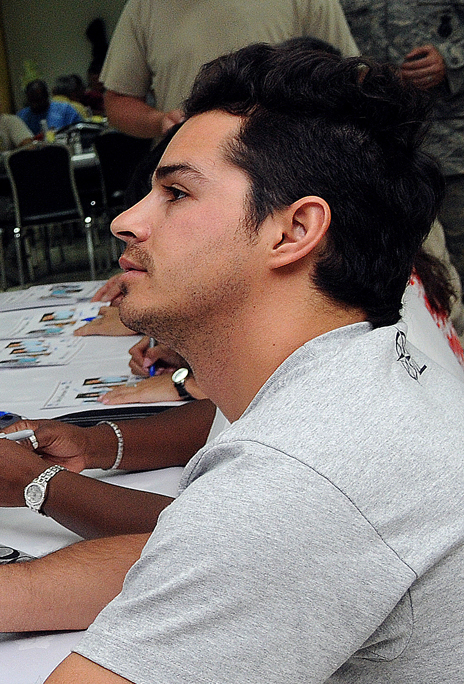
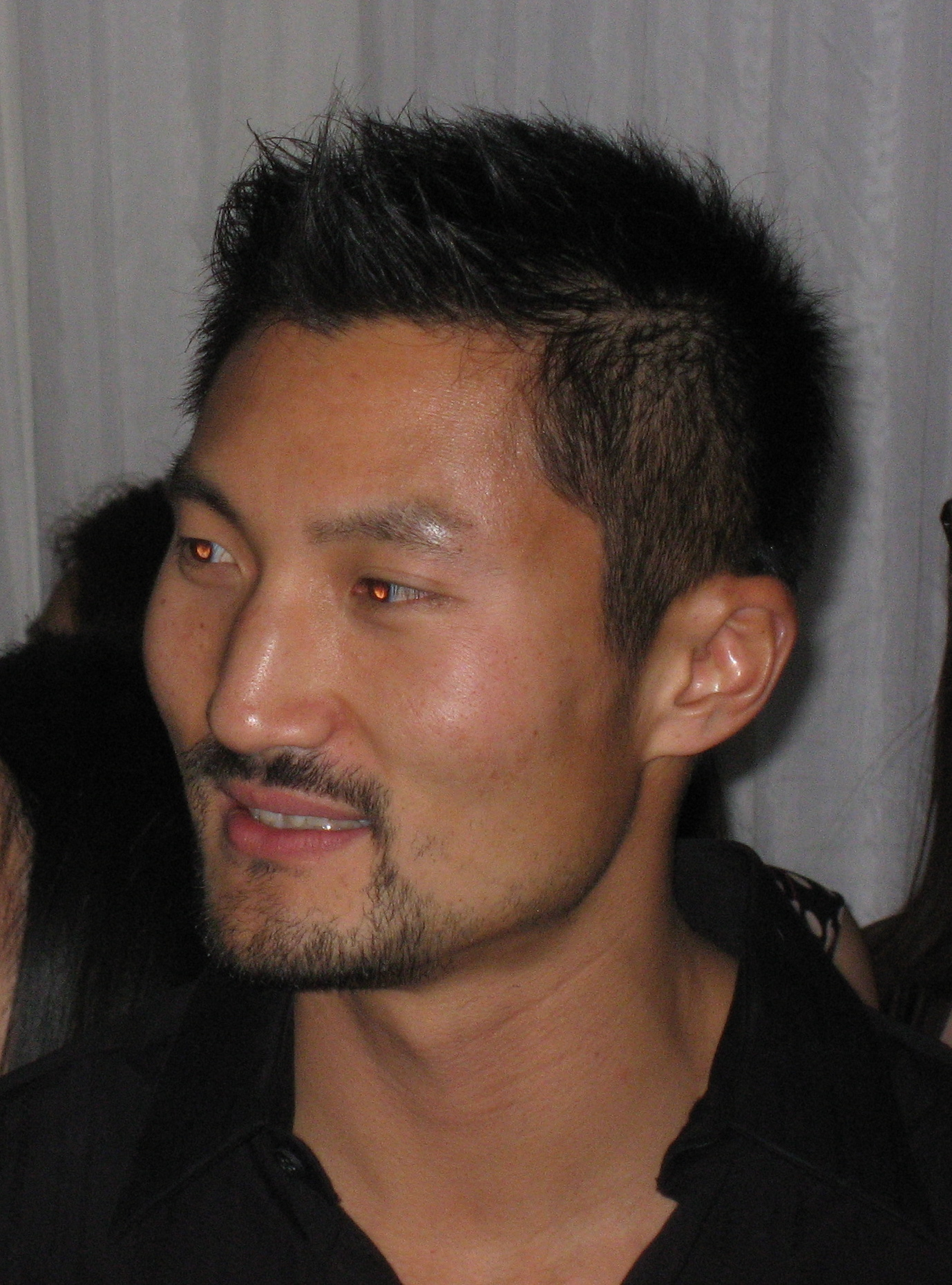
From left to right: J. P. Calderon, Parvati Shallow, Ozzy Lusth, and Yul Kwon

The tribes were named after the islands of the Cook Islands: Manihiki, Pukapuka, Aitutaki, and Rarotonga. They were later merged into a single tribe, Aitutonga.

Notable people on this cast include professional volleyball player J. P. Calderon; and actor, producer, and screenwriter, Jonathan Penner.

List of Survivor: Cook Islands contestants
Contestant	Age	From	Tribe				Finish	
Contestant	Age	From	Original	Switched	Post-mutiny	Merged	Placement	Day
Sekou Bunch	45	Los Angeles, California	Manihiki				1st voted out	Day 3
Billy Garcia	36	New York City, New York	Aitutaki				2nd voted out	Day 6
Cecilia Mansilla	29	Oakland, California	Aitutaki	Aitutaki			3rd voted out	Day 8
John Paul "J.P." Calderon	30	Long Beach, California	Aitutaki	Rarotonga			4th voted out	Day 11
Stephannie Favor	35	Columbia, South Carolina	Manihiki	Rarotonga			5th voted out	Day 14
Anh-Tuan "Cao Boi" Bui	42	Christiansburg, Virginia	Pukapuka	Aitutaki			6th voted out	Day 15
Cristina Coria	35	Santa Monica, California	Aitutaki	Rarotonga			7th voted out	Day 15
Jessica Smith	27	Chico, California	Rarotonga	Aitutaki			8th voted out	Day 18
Brad Virata	29	Santa Monica, California	Pukapuka	Rarotonga	Rarotonga		9th voted out 1st jury member	Day 21
Rebecca Borman	34	Laurelton, New York	Manihiki	Rarotonga	Rarotonga		10th voted out 2nd jury member	Day 24
Jenny Guzon-Bae	36	Lake Forest, Illinois	Pukapuka	Rarotonga	Rarotonga		11th voted out 3rd jury member	Day 24
Nate Gonzalez	26	Playa del Rey, California	Manihiki	Rarotonga	Rarotonga	Aitutonga	12th voted out 4th jury member	Day 27
Candice Woodcock	23	Washington, D.C.	Rarotonga	Aitutaki	Rarotonga	Aitutonga	13th voted out 5th jury member	Day 30
Jonathan Penner	44	Los Angeles, California	Rarotonga	Aitutaki	Rarotonga	Aitutonga	14th voted out 6th jury member	Day 33
Parvati Shallow	23	West Hollywood, California	Rarotonga	Rarotonga	Rarotonga	Aitutonga	15th voted out 7th jury member	Day 36
Adam Gentry	27	San Diego, California	Rarotonga	Rarotonga	Rarotonga	Aitutonga	16th voted out 8th jury member	Day 37
Sundra Oakley	31	Los Angeles, California	Manihiki	Aitutaki	Aitutaki	Aitutonga	Eliminated; 9th jury member	Day 38
Becky Lee	28	Washington, D.C.	Pukapuka	Aitutaki	Aitutaki	Aitutonga	2nd runner-up	Day 39
Oscar "Ozzy" Lusth	24	Venice, California	Aitutaki	Aitutaki	Aitutaki	Aitutonga	Runner-up	Day 39
Yul Kwon	31	San Mateo, California	Pukapuka	Aitutaki	Aitutaki	Aitutonga	Sole Survivor	Day 39

=== Future appearances ===
Jonathan Penner, Ozzy Lusth, and Parvati Shallow were selected to compete again in Survivor: Micronesia. Shallow returned for Survivor: Heroes vs. Villains with Candice Woodcock. Lusth returned for a third time in Survivor: South Pacific and for a fourth time in Survivor: Game Changers. Penner returned for his third time in Survivor: Philippines. Woodcock returned for her third time, this time as "Candice Cody," in Survivor: Blood vs. Water along with her husband, John. Shallow and Yul Kwon returned to compete on Survivor: Winners at War. Shallow competed on the world tribe of Survivor: Australia V The World in 2025. Lusth also competed on Survivor 50: In the Hands of Fans.

Outside of Survivor, Lusth competed on the second season of American Ninja Warrior. Kwon was a contestant on the USA Network reality competition series, Snake in the Grass. In 2024, Shallow competed on the second season of the Peacock reality TV series The Traitors. In 2025, Shallow competed on the second season of Deal or No Deal Island.

== Season summary ==
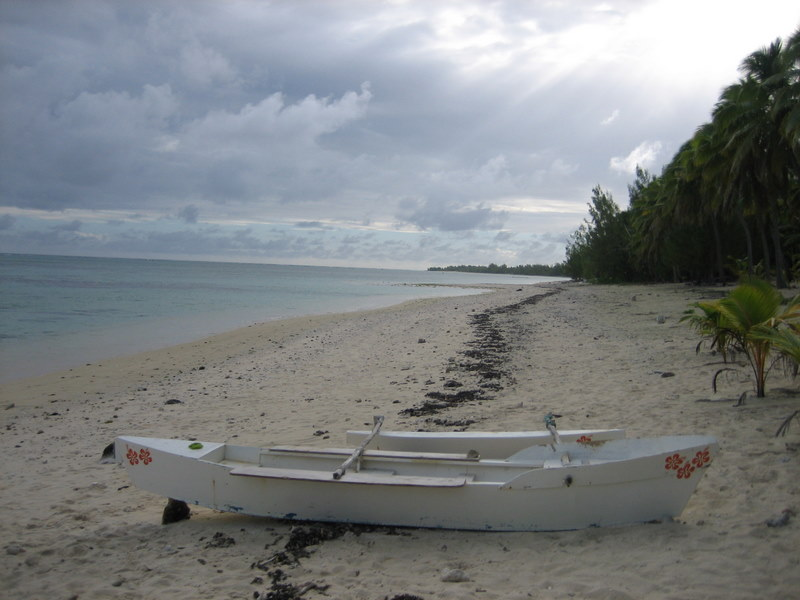
The beach on Aitutaki during filming of Survivor: Cook Islands in July 2006 (photo by Ian Sewell)

The 20 participants, divided into four tribes (based on race) for the first six days of the competition, were then merged into two tribes. An early visit to Exile island resulted in Yul discovering the hidden immunity idol. With the tribes equal at six members each on Day 19, the castaways were given the choice to mutiny and join the other tribe; Candice and Jonathan opted to do so, leaving the Aitutaki tribe at four members (Yul, Ozzy, Becky, and Sundra) against the eight-member Rarotonga tribe. With teamwork, Yul's intelligence and Ozzy's swimming skills, Aitutaki defeated Rarotonga at every subsequent challenge and left Rarotonga with only five members at the merge.

While the Aitu Four merged, Yul cemented his Aitutaki alliance by showing them the idol and convinced Jonathan to vote with them. The Aitu Four took control of the game, and were the final four players remaining. With Yul holding the hidden immunity idol and Ozzy winning the final challenge, the four agreed to let a fire-making challenge decide who would join them at the final tribal council; it took over an hour to complete, with Becky victorious. The jury, seeing Becky following Yul and her poor performance in the fire-making challenge, did not vote for her; Yul's brains edged out Ozzy's brawn, five votes to four.

Challenge winners and eliminations by episode
Episode			Challenge winner(s)		Exile Island	Eliminated	
No.	Title	Original air date	Reward	Immunity	Exile Island	Tribe	Player
1	"I Can Forgive Her, but I Don't Have to Because She Screwed with My Chickens"	September 14, 2006	Pukapuka		Jonathan (Rarotonga)	Manihiki	Sekou
1	"I Can Forgive Her, but I Don't Have to Because She Screwed with My Chickens"	September 14, 2006	Aitutaki		Jonathan (Rarotonga)	Manihiki	Sekou
1	"I Can Forgive Her, but I Don't Have to Because She Screwed with My Chickens"	September 14, 2006	Rarotonga		Jonathan (Rarotonga)	Manihiki	Sekou
2	"Dire Strengths and Dead Weight"	September 21, 2006	Pukapuka (Note: For tying for first in the challenge, Puka Puka and Rarotonga won a reward in addition to immunity.)		Yul (Pukapuka)	Aitutaki	Billy
2	"Dire Strengths and Dead Weight"	September 21, 2006	Rarotonga		Yul (Pukapuka)	Aitutaki	Billy
2	"Dire Strengths and Dead Weight"	September 21, 2006		Manihiki	Yul (Pukapuka)	Aitutaki	Billy
3	"Flirting and Frustration"	September 28, 2006	None (Note: There was no reward challenge due to the tribe switch.)	Rarotonga	Candice (Aitutaki)	Aitutaki	Cecilia
4	"Ruling the Roost"	October 5, 2006	Aitutaki	Aitutaki	Adam (Rarotonga)	Rarotonga	J.P.
5	"Don't Cry Over Spilled Octopus"	October 12, 2006	Rarotonga	Aitutaki	Jonathan (Aitutaki)	Rarotonga	Stephannie
6	"Plan Voodoo"	October 19, 2006	Aitutaki		None (Note: Due to both tribes going to Tribal Council, no one was exiled.)	Aitutaki	Cao Boi
6	"Plan Voodoo"	October 19, 2006	Nate (Note: For winning the reward challenge, Aitutaki earned the right to "kidnap" a member of Rarotonga; they selected Nate, who shared Aitutaki's reward and was granted immunity but could not vote. There was no immunity challenge and both tribes went to Tribal Council.)		None	Rarotonga	Cristina
7	"A Closer Look"	October 26, 2006	Recap Episode				
8	"Why Aren't You Swimming?!"	November 2, 2006	Aitutaki	Rarotonga	Adam (Rarotonga)	Aitutaki	Jessica
9	"Mutiny"	November 9, 2006	Aitutaki	Aitutaki	Candice (Rarotonga)	Rarotonga	Brad
10	""People That You Like Want To See You Suffer"	November 16, 2006	Aitutaki	Aitutaki	Candice (Rarotonga)	Rarotonga	Rebecca
10	""People That You Like Want To See You Suffer"	November 16, 2006	Aitutaki	Aitutaki	Candice (Rarotonga)	Rarotonga	Jenny
11	"Why Would You Trust Me?"	November 23, 2006	None (Note: There was no reward challenge and exiling due to the merge.)	Ozzy	None	Aitutonga	Nate
12	"You're a Rat..."	November 30, 2006	Survivor Auction	Adam	Candice (Note: At the Survivor Auction, Becky bought the right to send someone to Exile Island and take all of their money. She chose Candice.)	Aitutonga	Candice
13	"Arranging a Hit"	December 7, 2006	Parvati [Adam, Sundra] (Note: The players and their loved ones competed as teams, and the winning loved one chose two other pairs to share the reward.)	Ozzy	Jonathan	Aitutonga	Jonathan
14	"I Have the Advantage...For Once"	December 14, 2006	Ozzy, Parvati, Yul	Ozzy	Adam	Aitutonga	Parvati
15	"This Tribe Will Self-Destruct in 5, 4, 3..."	December 17, 2006	None	Ozzy	None	Aitutonga	Adam
15	"This Tribe Will Self-Destruct in 5, 4, 3..."	December 17, 2006	None	Ozzy	None	Aitutonga	Sundra
16	"Reunion"	December 17, 2006					

In the case of multiple tribes or castaways who win reward or immunity, they are listed in order of finish, or alphabetically where it was a team effort; where one castaway won and invited others, the invitees are in brackets.

== Episodes ==
No. overall	No. in season	Title	Original release date	U.S. viewers (millions)	Rating/share (18-49)
184	1	"I Can Forgive Her but I Don't Have to Because She Screwed with My Chickens"	September 14, 2006	18.00	6.5/20
Contestants had two minutes to salvage what they could from a boat before paddling to shore. As they scoured the ship for supplies, Puka Puka's Yul grabbed a chicken which escaped; Rarotonga's Jonathan caught it. At Aitutaki, Billy created shelter; Ozzy's survival skills fooled him. In Rarotonga, Jonathan was angry when Jessica accidentally freed the chicken. At Manihiki, the women complained about Sekou (their leader) taking too many breaks. The tribes race to assemble a puzzle boat with seven braces, paddle the boat out, retrieve fire from a bonfire on a raft, and return to shore with the fire. They must then use the braces as ladder rungs, climb to the top of a platform and light a fire bale. The first three tribes to the top win flint and immunity; the first-place tribe will receive a crate of fire-making essentials, including kerosene and waterproof matches. All the tribes except Manihiki won flint and immunity, and Puka Puka (who finished first) received the fire-making kit. Sekou and Nate sent Jonathan from Rarotonga to Exile Island in return for Puka Puka's lost chicken, alienating Manihiki's women. Jeff gave Jonathan the first clue to the hidden immunity idol before he left for Exile Island. Stephannie, Sundra and Rebecca united to eliminate Sekou, and received flint to make fire.
185	2	"Dire Strengths and Dead Weight"	September 21, 2006	17.43	6.5/18
The Manihiki tribe started a fire. Jonathan returned from Exile Island to Rarotonga, and was disappointed that little had changed since he left. At Puka Puka, tribe members became tired of Cao Boi's jokes and long stories. At Aitutaki, Ozzy forced his tribe to issue the next immunity challenge to get rid of the lazy Billy. Host Jeff Probst tells a story about James Cook's voyage, and each tribe must remember a story about Cook. Tied together, the tribe must make their way over and under logs and through a field of poles to gather seven answer flags. When they cross a rope bridge over water, they must use the flags to answer five questions about the story. The first tribes to complete the challenge will receive tarps, and the three top finishers win Immunity. Puka Puka and Rarotonga tied for first place; Manihiki finished third, and was saved from the tribal council. The losing tribe, Aitutaki, sent Yul from Puka Puka to Exile Island (where he deciphered clues to discover the immunity idol in the sand). Billy talked about finding love with Rarotonga's Candice, but Candice said "we love you" to lift his spirits; Billy was voted out.
186	3	"Flirting and Frustration"	September 28, 2006	16.85	5.9/16
The four ethnically-divided tribes will be merged into two. Manihiki and Puka Puka were dissolved, and their supplies were divided by the Aitutaki and Rarotonga tribes. At Aitutaki, Cecilia told Candice about Billy's "I love you" incident; Candice laughed as she made alliances with Yul, Becky and Jonathan. Yul told Becky that he found the hidden immunity idol. The tribes will be clipped together by a rope, each member carrying a 15-pound sandbag. They will start on opposite sides of the course, racing through knee-deep water to catch the other tribe. If a member drops out, they must give their sandbag to a fellow tribe member. The first tribe to tackle a member of the other tribe to the ground wins immunity. The Aitutaki men tried to fend off the Rarotonga men (Adam, Brad, J.P., and Nate), but Rarotonga tackled them and securing immunity for their team. Rarotonga banished Candice to Exile Island. Cao Boi, Cecilia, Jessica, Ozzy, and Sundra united to vote out Becky. After lobbying by Jonathan and Yul, Cao Boi and Jessica switched their vote to Cecilia and she was voted out.
187	4	"Ruling the Roost"	October 5, 2006	15.83	5.6/16
The women complained about the men's egotism. Each tribe had two members attached to a rope snaking over, under and around a series of obstacles. The tribe pushed and pulled their members through the course. When they reached the end of the rope, a member swam to a barrel, retrieved a decoder, returned and deciphered a phrase. The tribe finishing first won three blankets, two pillows and one hammock. Aitutaki won, and chose Adam for exile. Cao Boi, egg hunting, knocked a chick from a nest and replaced it. Members of each tribe assembled a stretcher and raced through the jungle to the beach. One member swam out to rescue another, who was shackled to a mast. Both swam back with a life ring, placed the rescued member on the stretcher and raced back through the jungle. The remaining three members built a fire strong enough to burn through a rope and raise the tribe's flag. Cao Boi carried Aitutaki past Rarotonga in the fire-making. Stephannie accepted blame for the defeat, volunteering to be exiled before changing her mind; J. P. was voted out. Adam and Brad betrayed J. P. and Nate, sending J. P. home.
188	5	"Don't Cry Over Spilled Octopus"	October 12, 2006	15.84	5.5/15
Cao Boi complained about Becky, Candice, and Sundra's laziness. Both tribes split into three pairs, each of whom stood on a platform. Each person held a hook with one arm. Every two minutes, members from the opposing tribe gave one of the pair a five-pound bag. The last pair holding their hooks and weight won fishing gear, spices and wine. Rarotonga's Nate and Adam won. Rarotonga returned Jonathan to Exile Island. Cristina's tribemates complained about her bossiness. Cao Boi, Jessica, and Ozzy explored the bay, accidentally reaching Rarotonga. At Aitutaki, Becky, Candice, and Yul tried to pull Sundra into their alliance with Jonathan. The tribes assembled stepping poles to transport two tribe members from one platform to another. When both tribe members were across, all eight members climbed over the platform and swam to a smaller tower. Aitutaki, the first tribe to climb the last tower and get all eight tribe members on the top deck, won immunity. Rarotonga decided that Cristina would be voted off next. When Stephannie and Nate gathered water from the well, Stephannie told Nate that she "wanted mashed potatoes and gravy"; Nate relayed this to the tribe, and Stephannie was voted off instead.
189	6	"Plan Voodoo"	October 19, 2006	15.02	5.3/14
Jonathan did not want to bring the immunity idol to the next reward challenge, and both tribes had to eliminate a member. In a sand pit, each tribe selected three members to be stationed at a post. Two members of the opposing tribe tried to remove them, dragging them through the sand over the finish line. Aitutaki, the first tribe to get all three opponents across their finish line, won a feast of lamb shanks, bread and apple cider. Cao Boi had a dream suggesting a strategy he called Plan Voodoo: to reveal the immunity idol by splitting a 3-3 vote between Jonathan and Candice. He chose them because he believed Jonathan had the idol, or one of the two people from the original Caucasian tribe would be eliminated. Yul, his ally, secretly had the idol and was annoyed by Cao Boi's eccentric behavior; Cao Boi was voted out. Aitutaki enjoyed the feast while listening to Rarotonga's tribal council. Aitutaki "kidnapped" Nate from Rarotonga; he could not vote, was immune from the vote, received a share of their reward and stayed at their camp until the next reward challenge. Although Cristina made amends with her tribe, she was voted out.
190	7	"A Closer Look"	October 26, 2006	15.30	5.4/14
A recap of the first 15 days.
191	8	"Why Aren't You Swimming?!"	November 2, 2006	15.30	5.4/14
Jessica, disappointed by Cao Boi's elimination, confronted the rest of the tribe. Becky, Candice and Yul planned their preferred order of elimination. Each tribe chose three swimmers and two puzzle-makers. The swimmers grabbed a club, swam to a platform, climbed to the top and jumped. In midair they smashed a plaster box (releasing a key), retrieved the key and swam back to shore. After retrieving six keys, the puzzle-makers used the keys to unlock a chest of puzzle pieces. The first tribe to solve the puzzle won two items; Aitutaki chose potatoes and peanut butter, and Rarotonga chose bread and peanut butter. Aitutaki made Nate miss the challenge; they won, again exiling Adam. Brad, a strong swimmer, upset his tribemates by doing the puzzle instead. Each tribe raced to build a log staircase to the top of a tower. When the entire tribe was on the tower, three members rode a zip line into the water, retrieved a bag of puzzle pieces and swam back. They then climbed a rope ladder to the top of the tower, where the three remaining members solved the puzzle. Rarotonga won immunity, and Jessica was eliminated.
192	9	"Mutiny"	November 9, 2006	14.39	4.8/13
Brad said that he did not trust his tribemates. In a "mutiny" offer, members could change tribes. Candice and Jonathan decided to rejoin Rarotonga. Two tribe members were in a barrel while two other members pushed, pulled and rolled the barrel through a series of obstacles to retrieve four buoys. They then floated the barrel through a final obstacle, collecting four flags anchored underwater. The tribes then paddled back to shore, hung their flags on flagpoles, recovered a buried axe and cut a rope to hoist the flags. Aitutaki won a trip to a coffee shop for muffins, Danishes and letters from home, and exiled Candice for mutinying. Jonathan tried to ally with Adam and Parvati, the remaining original Rarotonga members. The four tribe members paddled out in glass-bottom boats in search of three targets on the ocean floor. Lining up the targets with crosshairs on their glasses, they dropped a cannonball and released two buoys. When all six buoys were collected, the tribe paddled back to shore. Each buoy had a clue, and a tribe needed all six buoys for the answer. Aitutaki won immunity with the mystery word ("bounty"), and Brad was voted out.
193	10	"People That You Like Want to See You Suffer"	November 16, 2006	15.35	5.3/14
Jenny and Parvati were alarmed by Candice and Adam's closeness. Two tribe members with a compass and a coordinate raced to a large sixteen-point compass rose to find buried treasure chests. Each chest had the next coordinates painted on top. When members found a chest, they raced back to their mat. The next two members took the compass and new coordinates to retrieve another chest. When the tribe had all four chests, they removed seven nautical flags (each flag an alphabet letter). Aitutaki was the first team to complete the task, winning a feast and exiling Candice. Both tribes were given information to memorize before the immunity challenge, where they swam, one at a time, to a platform. Each member dove down, unclipped a bundle of island names and swam back to shore. When all the members returned, they identified ten islands at an answer table. Aitutaki won immunity, and a sealed bottle with a note inside was given to Rarotonga to be opened after they have voted out a player. Rebecca was voted out, and the note in the bottle instructed Rarotonga to vote out another member (Jenny).
194	11	"Why Would You Trust Me?"	November 23, 2006	12.67	4.3/13
The tribes were notified of the merge. The castaways decided to live on the Rarotonga beach and call themselves "Aitutonga". The former Aitutaki merged in the minority, four to Rarotonga's five. Yul and Becky agreed that Jonathan would most likely flip. Yul told Sundra and Ozzy about the hidden immunity idol and his plan to bring Jonathan over. Each individual hung onto a pole for as long as possible. After two hours and 15 minutes, Ozzy defeated Candice in the first individual immunity challenge. Yul decided to show Jonathan the hidden immunity idol to sway him back to his side. Jonathan asked Yul to vote for Nate in exchange for his flipping, and Yul agreed. Jonathan joined the former Aitutaki members in voting out Nate.
195	12	"You're a Rat..."	November 30, 2006	15.63	5.4/14
Each contestant received $500, could bid in $20 increments, and could share money in a survivor auction. Becky and Yul outbid Candice and Adam for a note with "the power to change the game"; Becky could exile a contestant and receive their money. Learning that Candice and Adam had not spent their money, Becky selected Candice. Before Candice left for Exile Island, saying that she would find the idol, Yul said that he had it. The contestants were annoyed at Jonathan's arrogance and Candice, on Exile Island, broke down emotionally. The castaways were quizzed about their memories of the last 30 days. Each tribe member answered four numeric questions, adding, subtracting or dividing the numeric answers for a final number. They then untied a corresponding box, searching for a key which opened a lock and raised a flag. The first three to raise their flag advanced to a final round; the remaining contenders unlocked and crawled through a timber tunnel, crossing pontoons to raise a final flag. Adam won immunity; back at camp, he, Candice, and Parvati snuggled in the shelter while the majority alliance ate fish caught by Jonathan. Candice confronted Jonathan about his arrogance, and was voted out.
196	13	"Arranging a Hit"	December 7, 2006	15.72	5.3/15
Jonathan, uneasy about being called a "rat" and "cancer", would not let Adam and Parvati ruin his strategy. Adam and Parvati told Yul that if he helped them vote Jonathan out, they would give him their jury votes. The blindfolded castaways had to scoop water with a bucket and pass it to their loved ones, who transport it to a raised bucket. The weight of the water lowered the bucket, raising a flag. Parvati won a picnic of fried chicken, meatloaf, and apple pie with her father and the right to exile Jonathan. Her father chose Sundra and her mother and Adam and his father to share the picnic. Parvati and Adam brought Ozzy, Yul, and Becky leftovers from the picnic. The castaways had to race out into the water and maneuver across a series of obstacles. When a tribe member reached the end, they retrieved a bundle of sticks, raced back and repeated for a second bundle of sticks. Untying the sticks and building a pole with them and the rope, Ozzy collected two rings for immunity and Jonathan went to the jury.
197	14	"I Have the Advantage...For Once"	December 14, 2006	14.55	5.0/14
Parvati and Adam tried to befriend one of the Aitutaki alliance to swing the vote. Tribe members dove into a mud pit, cover themselves with as much mud as they could, raced back and scrape it off into a bucket. Ozzy, Parvati and Yul won a trip to a local spa, and Ozzy exiled Adam. Parvati tried to secure Ozzy's vote, and Becky and Sundra talked about voting Ozzy off; Yul was hesitant. Tribe members carried four bundles of puzzle pieces across balance beams to a mat. When all four bundles were collected, they used the pieces to create a table maze and maneuver a cannonball into each of two corner pockets. Ozzy won immunity; Adam talked to Yul about keeping him on the island. Adam and Parvati were later caught trying to get Ozzy's vote. Yul returned Jonathan's hat, and Parvati was voted off.
198	15	"This Tribe Will Self-Destruct in 5, 4, 3..."	December 17, 2006	16.42	5.7/14
The castaways raced around a rope course, collecting a bag of puzzle pieces at each of eight stations. When a tribe member got a bag, they had to return to their table before returning to the course. When a tribe member got all eight bags, they used the puzzle pieces to make an eight-point compass rose. When the puzzle was assembled, a flag was raised; Ozzy won immunity. Adam tried to get Ozzy and Sundra to vote for Yul to make Yul use the hidden immunity idol, but he was voted out unanimously. The remaining castaways stood on a small steel perch in the water. Every 15 minutes, tribe members removed part of the perch; Ozzy, the last person left standing, won immunity. He and Sundra voted for Becky, and Becky and Yul voted for Sundra; in a fire-making challenge, the first castaway to make a fire advanced to the final tribal council. Becky secured her spot in the final three. The jury was split between Yul and Ozzy.
199	16	"Reunion"	December 17, 2006	N/A	TBA
Months later, the votes were read; Yul won, becoming the thirteenth Sole Survivor in a 5–4–0 vote over Ozzy and Becky. The castaways returned to discuss the season with host Jeff Probst live from CBS Television City in Los Angeles. As a result of a viewers' poll, Ozzy won a Mercury Mariner car.

== Voting history ==
	Original tribes		Switched tribes						Post-mutiny tribes			Merged tribe						
Episode	1	2	3	4	5	6		8	9	10		11	12	13	14	15		
Day	3	6	8	11	14	15		18	21	24 (Note: After voting out one member at Tribal Council, Rarotonga was instructed to immediately vote out another.)		27	30	33	36	37	38	
Voting tribe	Manihiki	Aitutaki	Aitutaki	Rarotonga	Rarotonga	Aitutaki	Rarotonga	Aitutaki	Rarotonga	Rarotonga	Rarotonga	Aitutonga	Aitutonga	Aitutonga	Aitutonga	Aitutonga	Aitutonga	
Eliminated	Sekou	Billy	Cecilia	J.P.	Stephannie	Cao Boi	Cristina	Jessica	Brad	Rebecca	Jenny	Nate	Candice	Jonathan	Parvati	Adam	Tie (Note: The first Tribal Council vote resulted in a tie. As there were only four castaways remaining, the two tied players competed in a fire-making challenge to resolve the tie.)	Sundra
Votes	3–2	4–1	5–3	7–2	7–1	6–1–1	4–2	6–1	7–1	6–1	4–2	5–4	5–3	6–1	4–2	4–1	2–2	Challenge (Note: Sundra lost to Becky in the fire-making tiebreaker.)
Voter	Vote																	
Yul			Cecilia			Cao Boi		Jessica				Nate	Candice	Jonathan	Parvati	Adam	Sundra	
Ozzy		Billy	Becky			Cao Boi		Jessica				Nate	Candice	Jonathan	Parvati	Adam	Becky	
Becky			Cecilia			Cao Boi		Jessica				Nate	Candice	Jonathan	Parvati	Adam	Sundra	Won
Sundra	Sekou		Becky			Cao Boi		Jessica				Nate	Candice	Jonathan	Parvati	Adam	Becky	Lost
Adam				J.P.	Stephannie		Cristina		Brad	Rebecca	Jenny	Yul	Jonathan	Jonathan	Sundra	Yul		
Parvati				J.P.	Stephannie		Cristina		Brad	Rebecca	Jenny	Yul	Jonathan	Jonathan	Sundra			
Jonathan			Cecilia			Cao Boi		Jessica	Brad	Rebecca	Jenny	Nate	Candice	Adam				
Candice			Exiled (Note: Candice was exiled until after the next Tribal Council, which meant she could not be voted out or participate in the vote.)			Cao Boi		Jessica	Brad	Rebecca	Jenny	Yul	Jonathan					
Nate	Sundra			Stephannie	Stephannie		Kidnapped (Note: Nate was "kidnapped" by the other tribe after they won the reward challenge, which meant he could not be voted out or participate in the vote.)		Brad	Rebecca	Jonathan	Yul						
Jenny				J.P.	Stephannie		Cristina		Brad	Rebecca	Jonathan							
Rebecca	Sekou			J.P.	Stephannie		Cristina		Brad	Jonathan								
Brad				J.P.	Stephannie		Jenny		Jonathan									
Jessica			Cecilia			Jonathan		Jonathan										
Cristina		Billy		J.P.	Stephannie		Jenny											
Cao Boi			Cecilia			Candice												
Stephannie	Sekou			J.P.	Cristina													
J.P.		Billy		Stephannie														
Cecilia		Billy	Becky															
Billy		Ozzy																
Sekou	Sundra																	

Jury vote
Episode	16		
Day	39		
Finalist	Yul	Ozzy	Becky
Votes	5–4–0		
Juror	Vote		
Sundra	Yes		
Adam	Yes		
Parvati		Yes	
Jonathan	Yes		
Candice	Yes		
Nate		Yes	
Jenny		Yes	
Rebecca		Yes	
Brad	Yes		

== Production ==
=== Filming ===
Pre-production began in spring 2006, and principal photography lasted from July 3 to August 11, 2006.

The tribal camps, Exile Island, and many of Survivor: Cook Islands' challenges were filmed on motu (islets) in the Aitutaki lagoon. The Rarotonga (later Aitutonga) tribe's camp was on Moturakau, and the Aitutaki tribe lived on Motukitiu. The short-lived tribes of Manihiki and Pukapuka lived on Rapota and Muritapua, respectively. Most challenges were filmed on Tekopua and Tapuaetai (One Foot Island). Exile Island is a small sand cay south of Tapuaetai, and the bow of the wooden ship was brought in for the show. West of Tapuaetai is another sand cay, called "Nude Island" by locals because of its lack of vegetation. The third challenge was staged in the shallow water just off the shore of Nude Island. Akaiami hosted challenges and "The Ponderosa", where eliminated contestants remained until the end of the game. The Tribal Council, the production camp, and a few challenges were located on the main island of Aitutaki. There were three reward trips to the neighboring islands of Atiu, Mitiaro, and Rarotonga. Taio Shipping diverted the MV Maungaroa from its usual schedule to a charter for the producers of Survivor: Cook Islands in June 2006, triggering fuel and electricity crises on the island of Mangaia.

== Reception ==
Survivor: Cook Islands received mixed reviews when it was first broadcast, but has become more popular over time. Although the racial cast divide was seen as polarizing, Kwon, Lusth and Penner were praised. Dalton Ross of Entertainment Weekly ranked the season 18th out of 40, calling it "listless" until the mutiny. In 2014, Joe Reid of The Wire ranked the season fifth out of 27. A Rob Has a Podcast poll the following year ranked the season 14th out of 30, with Rob Cesternino ranking it 24th. Cesternino's 2021 Survivor All-Time Top 40 Rankings podcast ranked the season 19th out of 40. The Purple Rock Podcast ranked this season seventh out of 40 in 2020, saying that it "features one of the more compelling narratives the show has ever had, and gives you the rare opportunity to see in-depth strategy talk between players." Later that year, Inside Survivor ranked the season 18th out of 40 and praised it for "having one of the best underdog stories of all time." In 2021, Kristen Kranz of Collider ranked Cook Islands as the 7th best season of the series and praised the diversity of the contestants, the "phenomenal" gameplay, as well as the introduction of "another group of influential players that would go on to shape the game in ways we couldn't imagine." In 2024, Nick Caruso of TVLine ranked this season 21st out of 47. In the 2015 issue of CBS Watch commemorating the 15th anniversary of Survivor, three of the top ten contestants voted by viewers as the greatest were in this season (Shallow, Lusth, and Kwon).

Kwon's gameplay had a positive reception. In the 2015 issue of CBS Watch commemorating the 15th anniversary of Survivor, he was ranked the ninth-greatest contestant in series history by viewers. That year, shortly before the premiere of Survivor: Worlds Apart, host Jeff Probst called Kwon one of his top ten winners and one of his top six male winners. A 2007 online readers' poll by Entertainment Weekly chose Kwon as its favorite Survivor winner. In 2017, the magazine had fans rank the 34 winners of Survivor; Kwon was ranked ninth.

The decision to divide the teams by race and ethnicity was controversial before the season aired, with members of the New York City Council's Black, Latino and Asian Caucus asking CBS not to broadcast the show. Those who worked on the show said that as divisions by age, gender, or gender and age combined had been accepted, race should not have been treated much differently. Probst conceded a slight difference, in that racial segregation was part of US history. Previous seasons have been criticized for their relative lack of diversity, with Probst saying that over 80 percent of Survivor's applicants were white.

According to Advertising Age magazine, more than a half-dozen major advertisers (including General Motors and Coca-Cola) withdrew their sponsorship after hearing about the teams' division. According to a New York Times report, the decision by several advertisers (also including the Home Depot, United Parcel Service, and Campbell Soup) not to sponsor the season was made three months before its start and was unrelated to its racial format.

Mad TV parodied Cook Islands in its twelfth-season premiere episode, which aired on September 16, 2006. The parody gave the white challengers significantly-easier tasks; a swimming challenge allowed the whites to use a canoe. A white fire-building kit consisted of gasoline and a DVD on how to make a fire; the Hispanic contestants received flint, the Asians received a matchstick, and the African-Americans received a glass of water.
