= Araura =

Araura may refer to:

- Aitutaki, an island in the Cook Islands for which Araura is a traditional name
- Araura College, the island's college
- Araura TV, a television station in Aitutaki, Cook Islands
