= Ootu Peninsula =

Coordinates: 18°50′21″S 159°45′41″W

The Ootu Peninsula, though connected to the main island of Aitutaki atoll of the Cook Islands, may in many respects be considered as one of the reef islands, being the largest and longest of them. It is located at the northern end of the eastern perimeter of Aitutaki Lagoon to the north and then west of the northernmost true reef island, Akitua, from which is separated by a channel 50 metres (160 ft) wide and less than 2 metres (6 ft 7 in) deep. The southernmost point of the peninsula is called Aumoana. The northernmost point of the peninsula, Teaumera, is also the northernmost point of Aitutaki as a whole. In the northeast is Kopu a Ruatapu, a boat passage through the fringing coral reef.

The peninsula is 3.25 kilometres (2.02 mi) long north–south, and has an area of 1.75 square kilometres (0.68 sq mi). It is 400 metres (1,300 ft) wide on the average, with a minimum of 250 metres (820 ft). At its widest, where it joins the main island, it reaches 750 metres (2,460 ft) in with. By comparison, Tekopua, the largest true reef island of Aitutaki, is 2.25 kilometres (1.40 mi) long and 0.71 square kilometres (0.27 sq mi) in area.

The seaward beach crest on the east side rises 2 to 3 metres (6 ft 7 in to 9 ft 10 in) above high water, and the surface slopes gently to the lagoon in the east. There are no dunes except at the southern end. The reef sediments of Ootu have been measured to be 13 to 20 metres (43 to 66 ft) thick.

The Ootu Peninsula is the site of Aitutaki Airport. The longer 1,804-metre (5,919 ft) runway in the southeast intersects a second runway of 1,388 metres (4,554 ft) to the northwest, along the northern shore, which is not in use anymore. The airport was constructed during World War II. Thereby, much of the vegetation had to be cleared. Only along the western shore towards the lagoon, and on the south of the longer runway, original vegetations remains relatively undisturbed, although there have been some holiday resort developments, such as the Popoara Ocean Breeze Villas.

Ootu Peninsula is part of Vaitupa District, one of eight districts of Aitutaki. The district consist of two tapere, Taakarere in the northwest and Vaitupa in the southeast. The peninsula is likewise divided between the two tapere, with the narrower southeastern part falling within the tapere of Vaitupa, and the larger northwestern part within the tapere of Taakarere.
