= Motukitiu =

Coordinates: 18.9483°S 159.7327°W

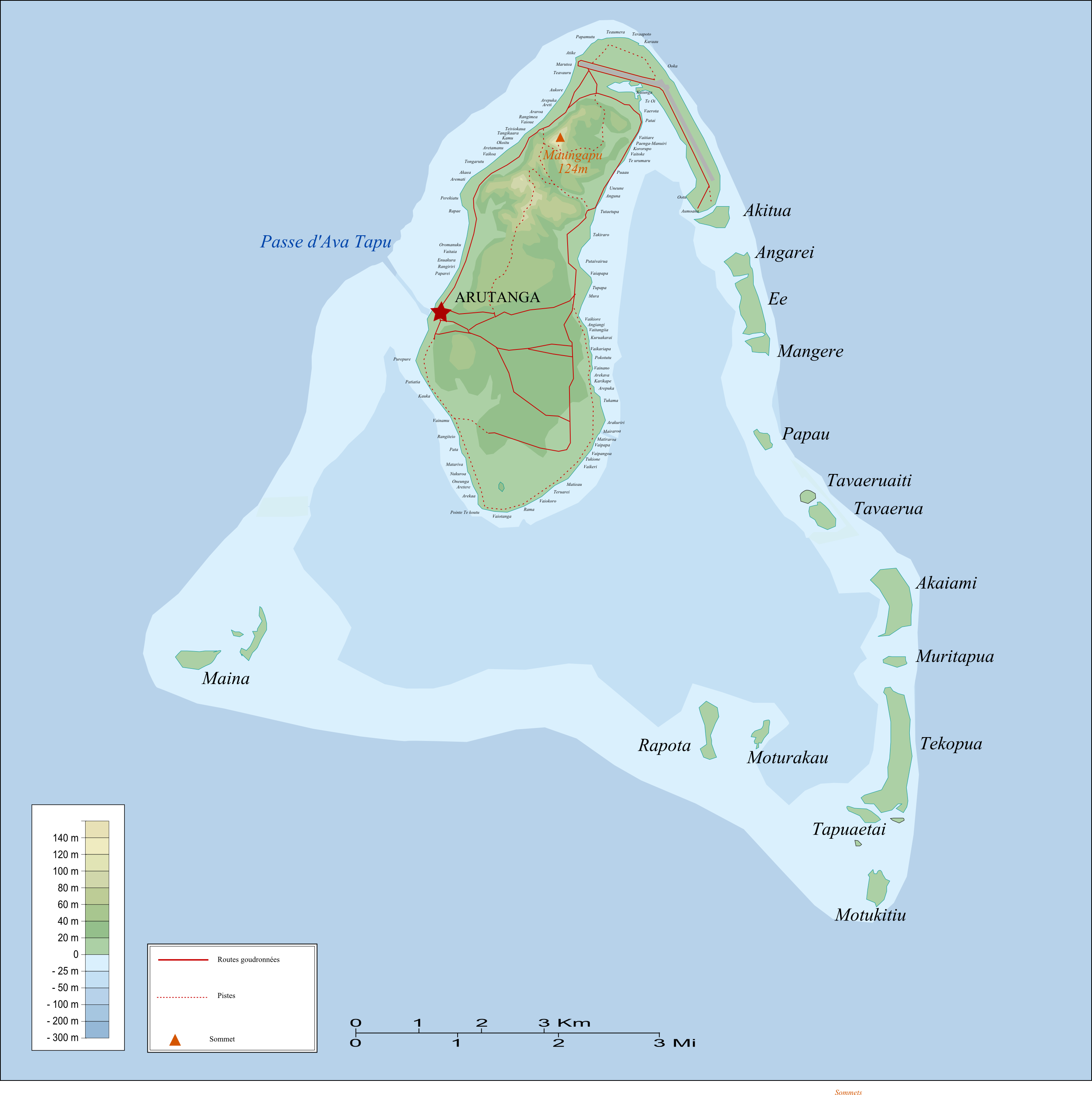
Topographic map of Aitutaki

Motukitiu is one of 22 islands in the Aitutaki atoll of the Cook Islands. It is a small island located at the southeastern tip of Aitutaki Lagoon, one kilometre (0.62 mi) to the south of the larger island of Tekopua and eight kilometres (5.0 mi) to the southeast of the main island of Aitutaki. The island is 450 metres (1,480 ft) long and 300 metres (980 ft) wide.

This motu has been featured in three survival-based television programs. The Aitutaki tribe lived on this island during the 2006 filming of Survivor: Cook Islands. Survivalist Les Stroud filmed the sixteenth episode ("South Pacific") of his show Survivorman on the island. In addition, the show Man, Woman, Wild filmed an episode here for its first season.
