= Tapuaeta cay =

Island in the Cook Islands

Coordinates: 18°56′21.79″S 159°44′9.63″W

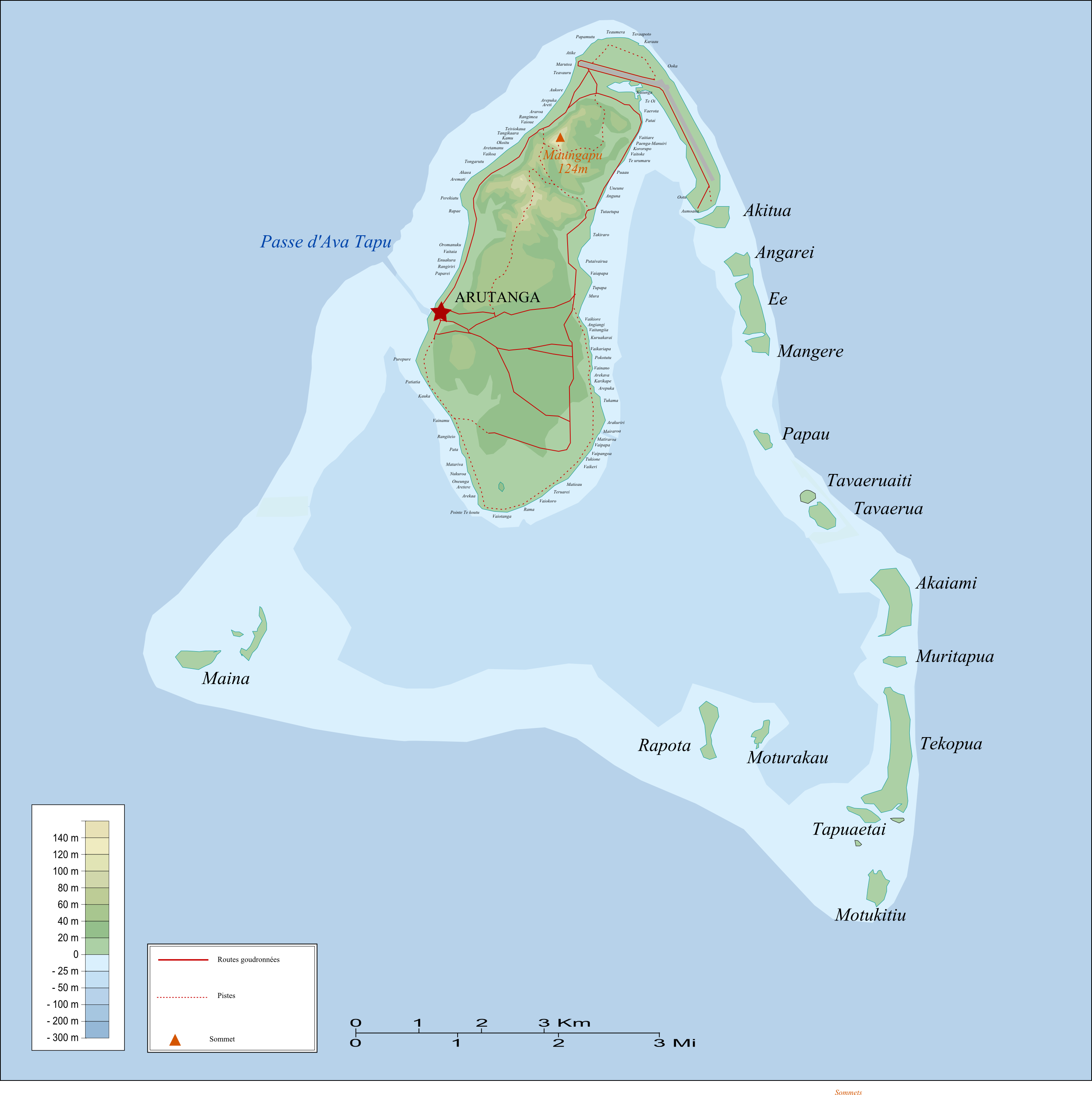
Topographic map of Aitutaki

Tapuaeta cay is one of 22 islands in the Aitutaki atoll of the Cook Islands. It is a sand cay located on the eastern perimeter of Aitutaki Lagoon, to the west of Tapuaetai, and is 190 metres (620 ft) long and up to 70 metres (230 ft) wide.
