= Akaiami =

Island of the Cook Islands

Coordinates: 18.9061°S 159.7295°W

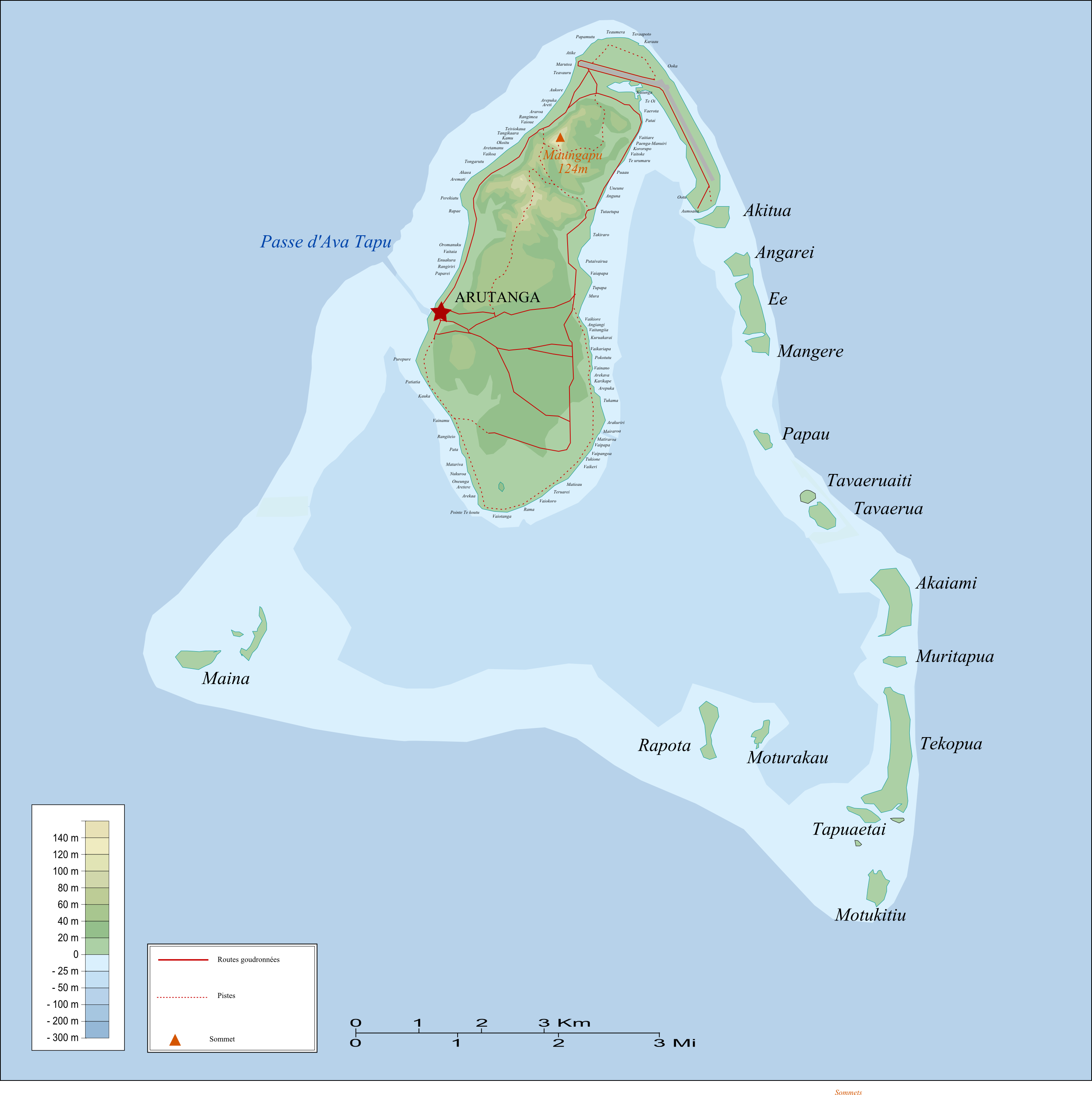
Topographic map of Aitutaki

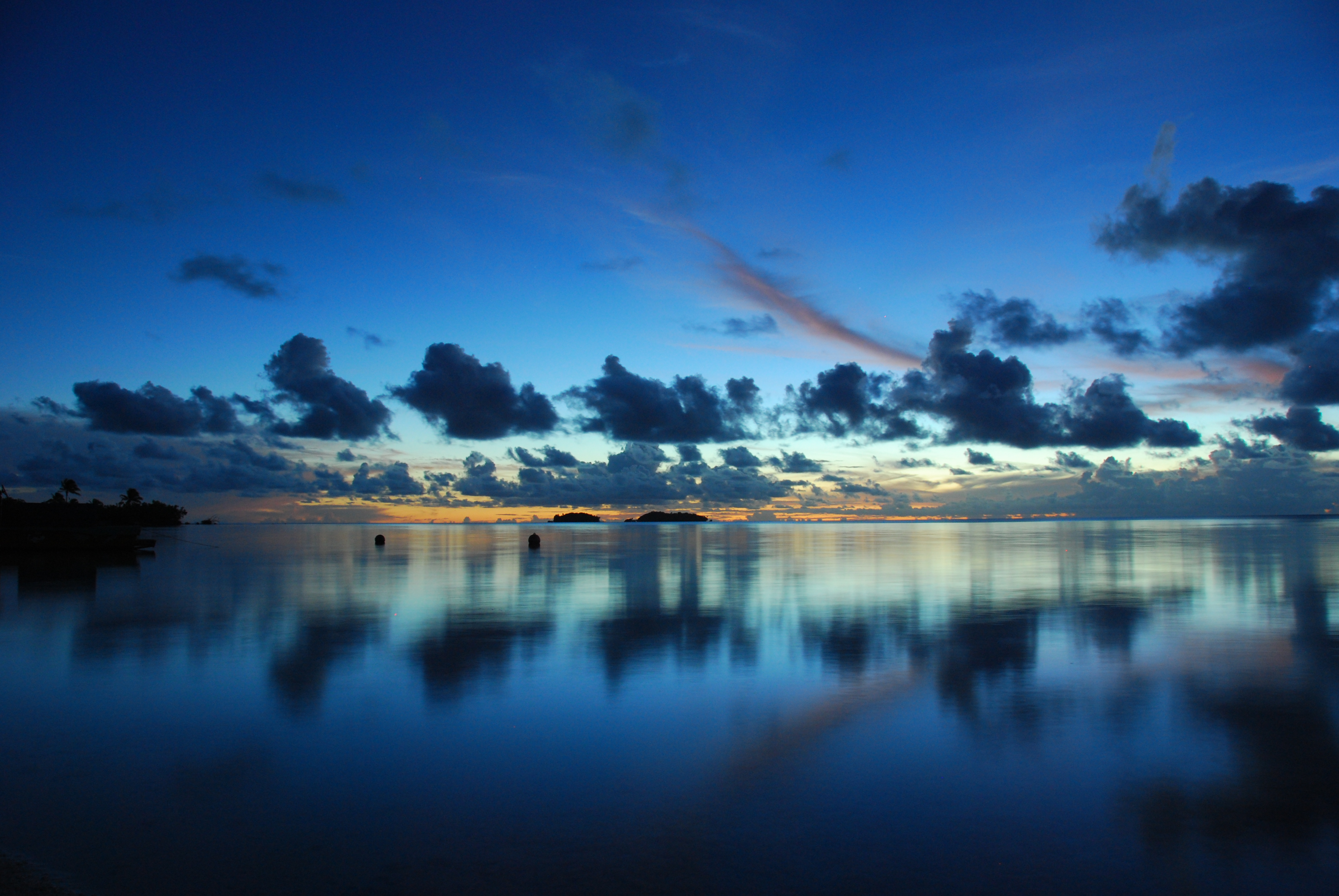
Sunset from Akaiami, Cook Islands

Akaiami is one of 22 islands in the Aitutaki atoll of the Cook Islands. It is located on the eastern perimeter of Aitutaki Lagoon to the north of the smaller islands of Muritapua, five kilometres (3.1 mi) to the southeast of the main island of Aitutaki. It is the second-largest of the Aitutaki motus, after Tekopua, measuring 1,120 metres (3,670 ft) long and 410 metres (1,350 ft) wide. During the 1950s the island was used as a stopover for TEAL (Tasman Empire Airways Limited) flying boats on the famous Coral Route. These operations ceased in 1960, and the only reminder are the remains of the purpose-built jetty.
