= Maina (Cook Islands) =

South Pacific island in the Aitutaki atoll

Coordinates: 18.914°S 159.835°W

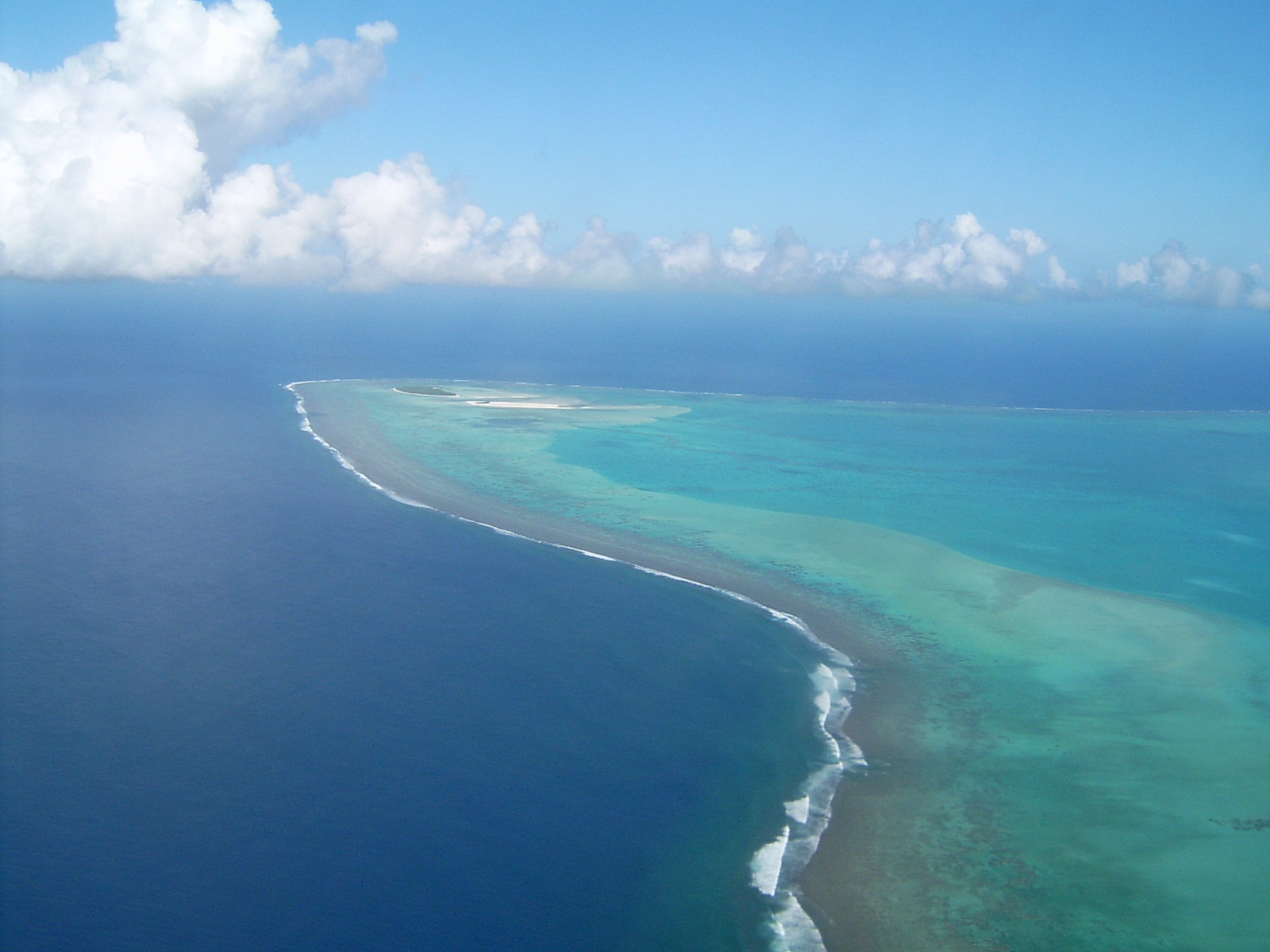
Motu Maina in Aitutaki Lagoon.

Maina is one of 22 islands in the Aitutaki atoll of the Cook Islands. It is located at the southwestern extreme of Aitutaki Lagoon, five kilometres (3.1 mi) to the southwest of the main island of Aitutaki. The island is a sand cay 710 metres (2,330 ft) long and up to 310 metres (1,020 ft) wide. In front of Maina island stands a sandbar known as "Honeymoon Island" named after a Canadian couple who decided to get married here.
