= Papeiha =

Polynesian missionary (died 1867)

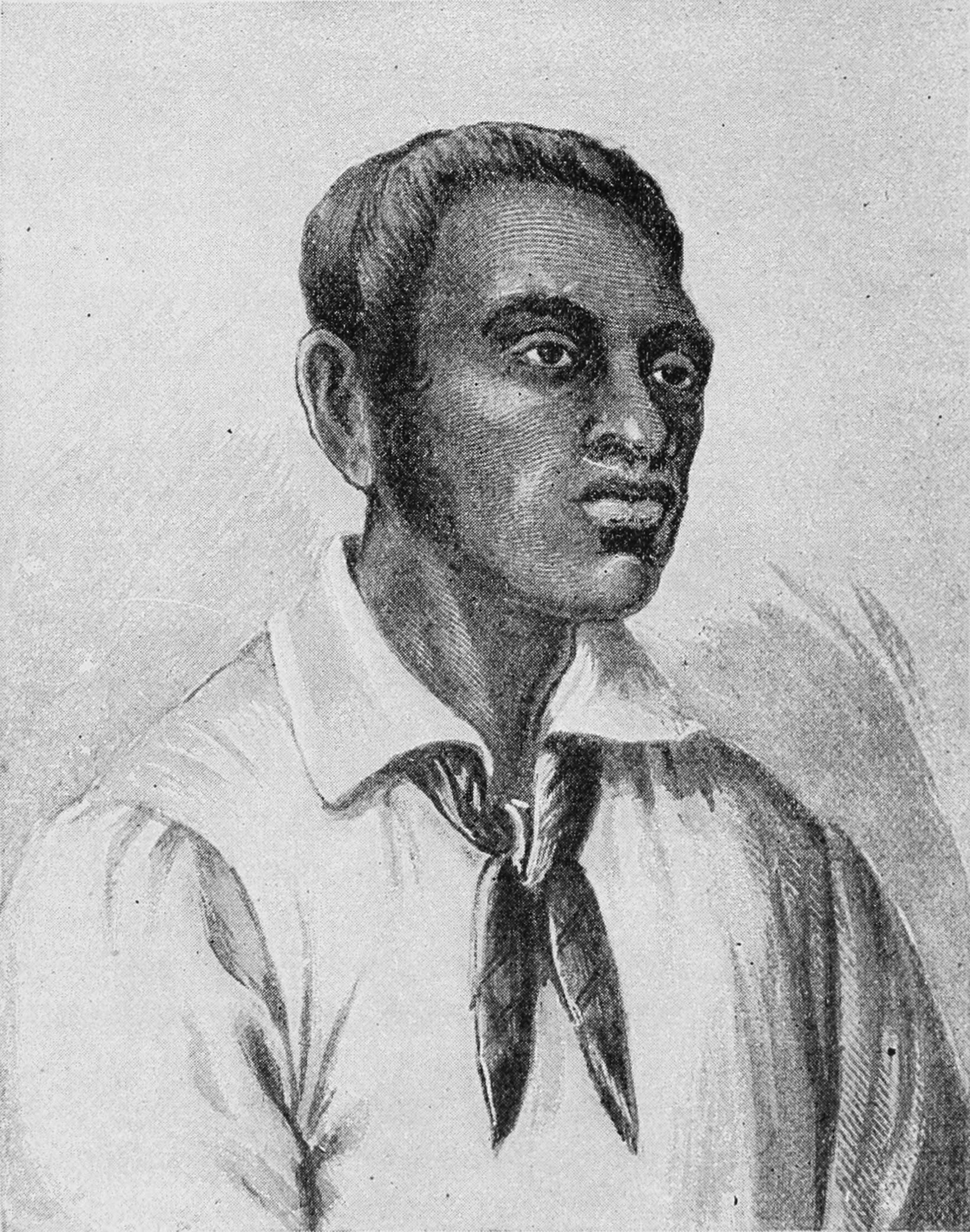
The Brave Teacher, Papeiha (1904)

Papeiha (sometimes Papehia, Papeia, or Pepeia) (died 25 May 1867) was an evangelist of the London Missionary Society. Trained by John Williams, he converted the islands of Aitutaki and Rarotonga in the Cook Islands to Christianity.

Papehia was originally from Bora Bora and was trained at the Uturoa mission station in Raiatea by John Williams. In October 1821 he and another Tahitian, Vahapata, were dropped off on Aitutaki by Williams, who was at the time travelling to Sydney. They were welcomed by Tamatoa Ariki, one of the island chiefs. They were joined the next year by another preacher, Faaori, and over the next two years converted the island to Christianity.

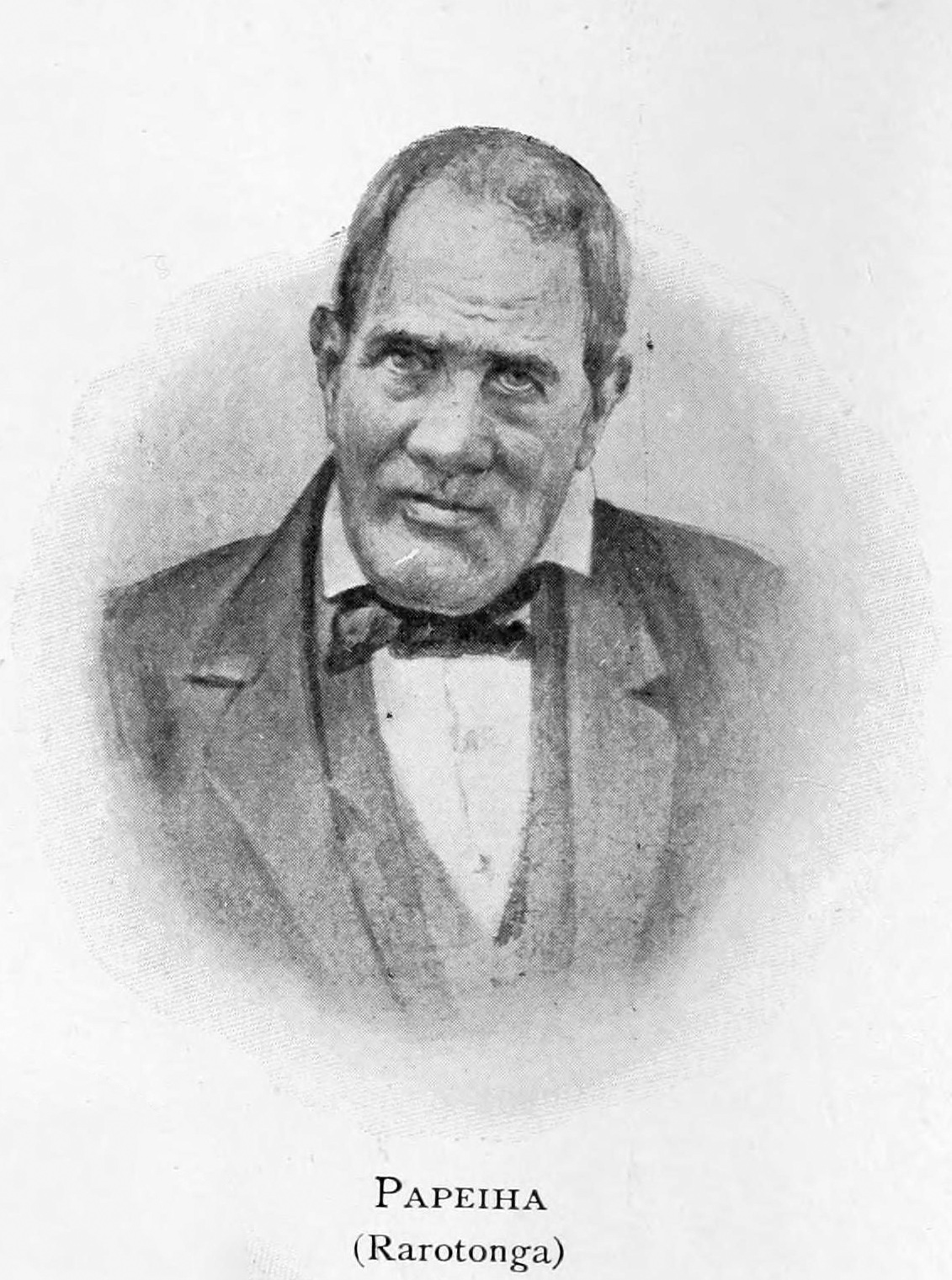
Papeiha (1899)

In July 1823 Williams returned with several other missionaries who he planned to deliver to the southern Cook Islands, and collected Papeiha to return him to Raiatea. After several stopovers to drop off missionaries, they arrived at Rarotonga on July 25, 1823. The Rarotongans were not friendly, and the missionaries decided to leave. Papeiha offered to replace them, and swam ashore with the Bible tied to his head. He was joined five months later by a Raiatean preacher, Tiberio. The two men convinced the Rarotongans to burn their "idols" (wooden statues representing their ancestors) and destroy their marae. They set up a chapel and began to preach. Further missionaries arrived in 1827 and 1828, and in 1830 the entire island had been converted.

In 1825 or 1826 Papeiha married Te Vaerua o te Rangi, the eldest daughter of Tinomana Enuarurutini Ariki, founding the lineage of Ngati Papehia. Together they had eight children: Te Upoko o Nga ariki (f), Tekao (m), Taromi (f), Rangitai (f), Isaia (m), Te Pori (f), Matoi (f), and Ani (f).
