= Papau =

Aitutaki island

Coordinates: 18.8825°S 159.7496°W

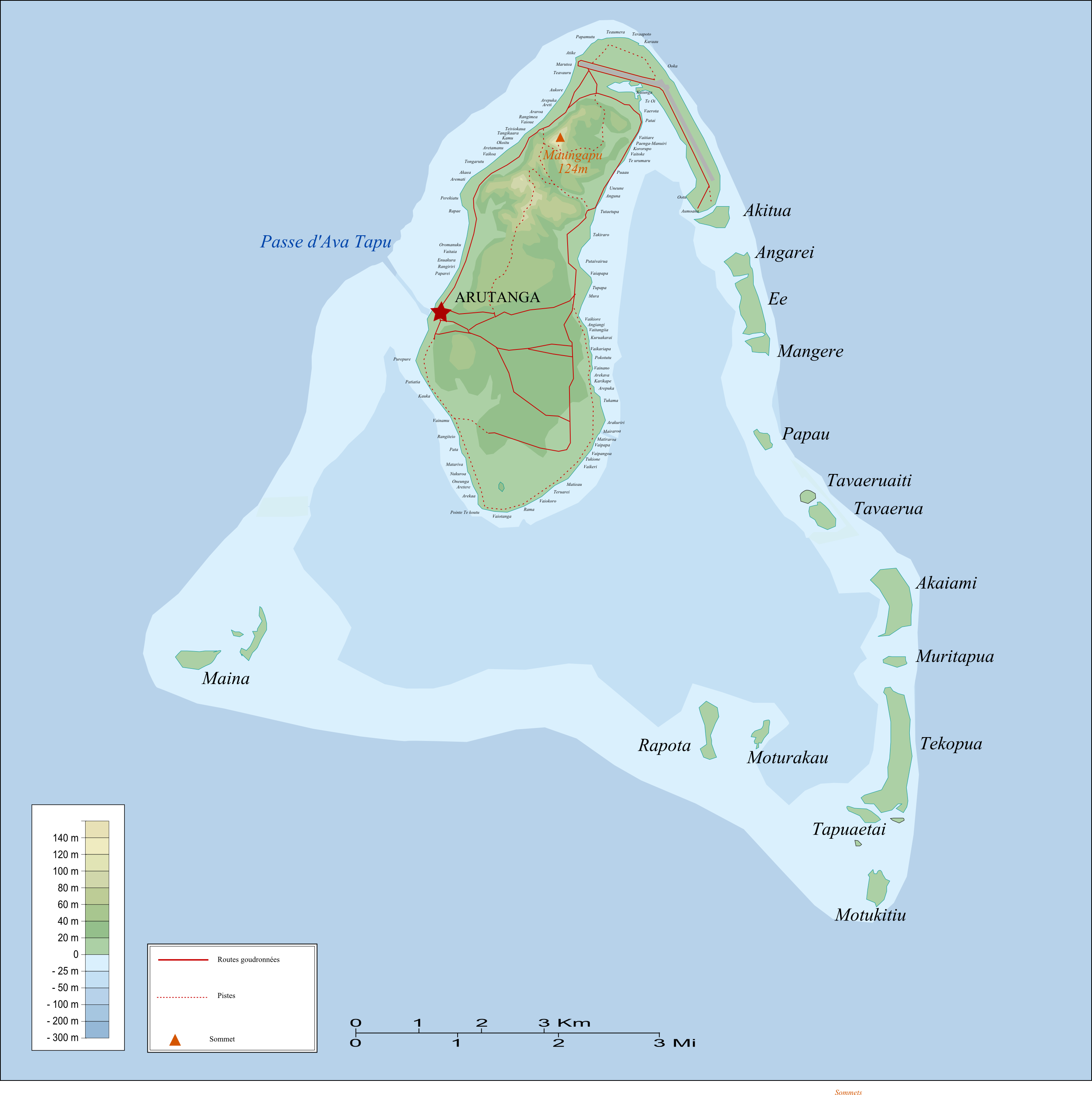
Topographic map of Aitutaki

Papau is one of 22 islands in the Aitutaki atoll of the Cook Islands. It is located on the eastern perimeter of Aitutaki Lagoon, four kilometres (2.5 mi) to the east of the main island of Aitutaki. The island is 400 metres (1,300 ft) long and 200 metres (660 ft) wide.
