= Araura College =

Coordinates: 18.8666°S 159.7921°W

Araura College is the only secondary school on Aitutaki, in the Cook Islands. It has an enrolment of about two hundred students. It was established as a junior high school in February 1963.
