= Akitua =

Island of the Cook Islands

Coordinates: 18.8501°S 159.7560°W

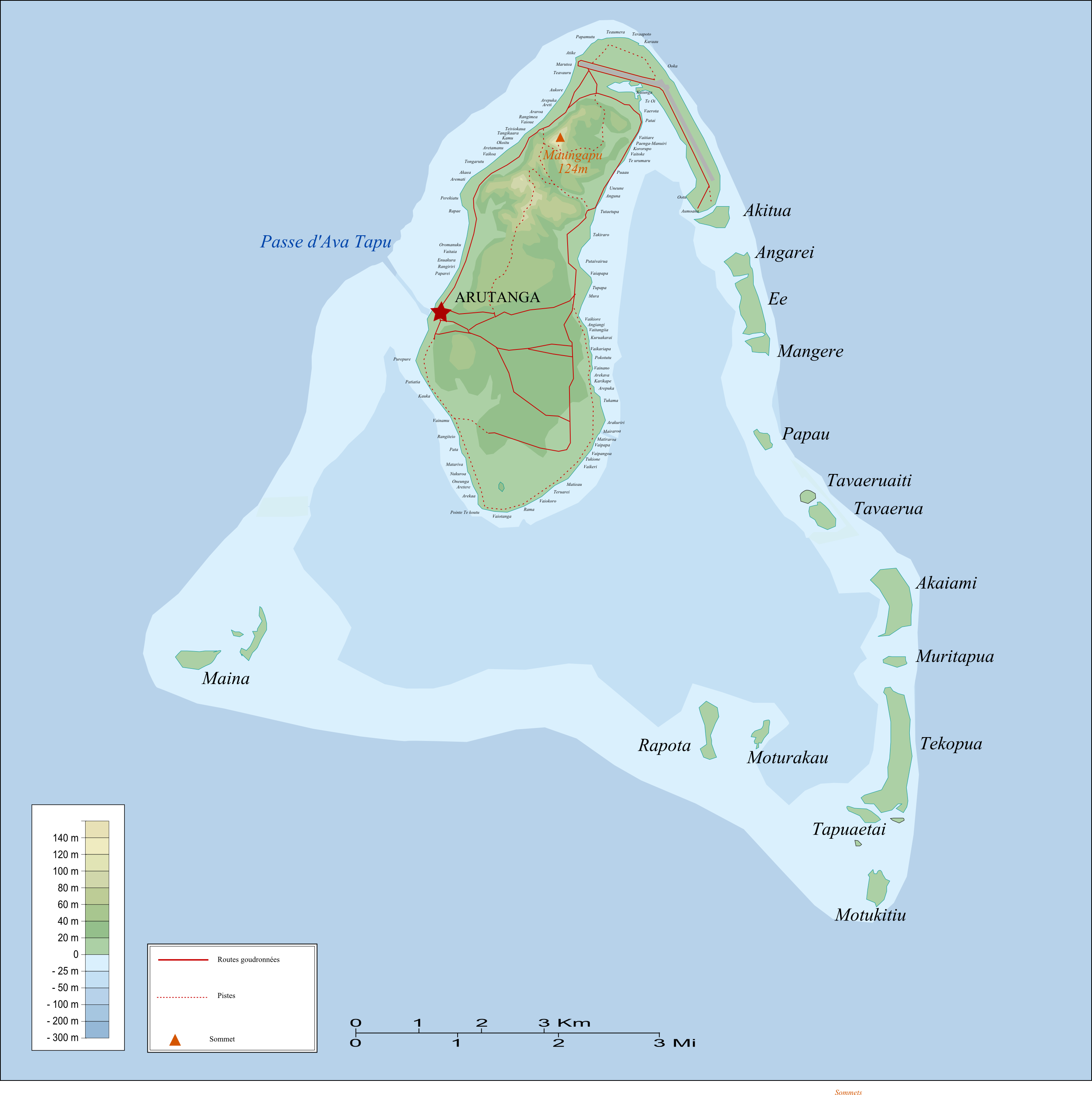
Topographic map of Aitutaki

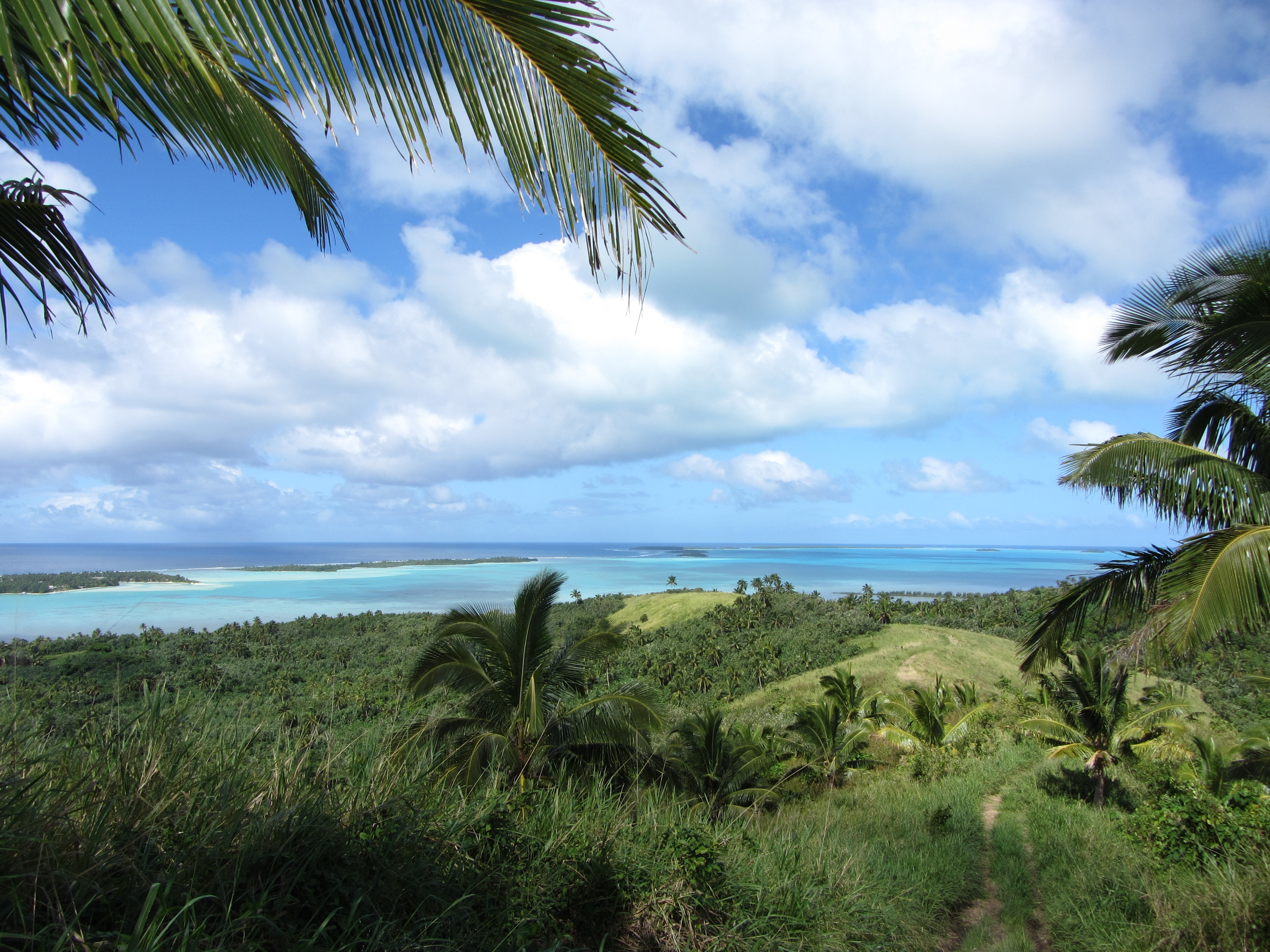
View on the island

Akitua is one of 22 islands in the Aitutaki atoll of the Cook Islands. It is on the northeastern perimeter of Aitutaki Lagoon and is 750 metres (2,460 ft) long and up to 310 metres (1,020 ft) wide. It is known for its beautiful turquoise, indigo blue, beach.
