= Muritapua =

Island in the Cook Islands

Coordinates: 18.915°S 159.730°W

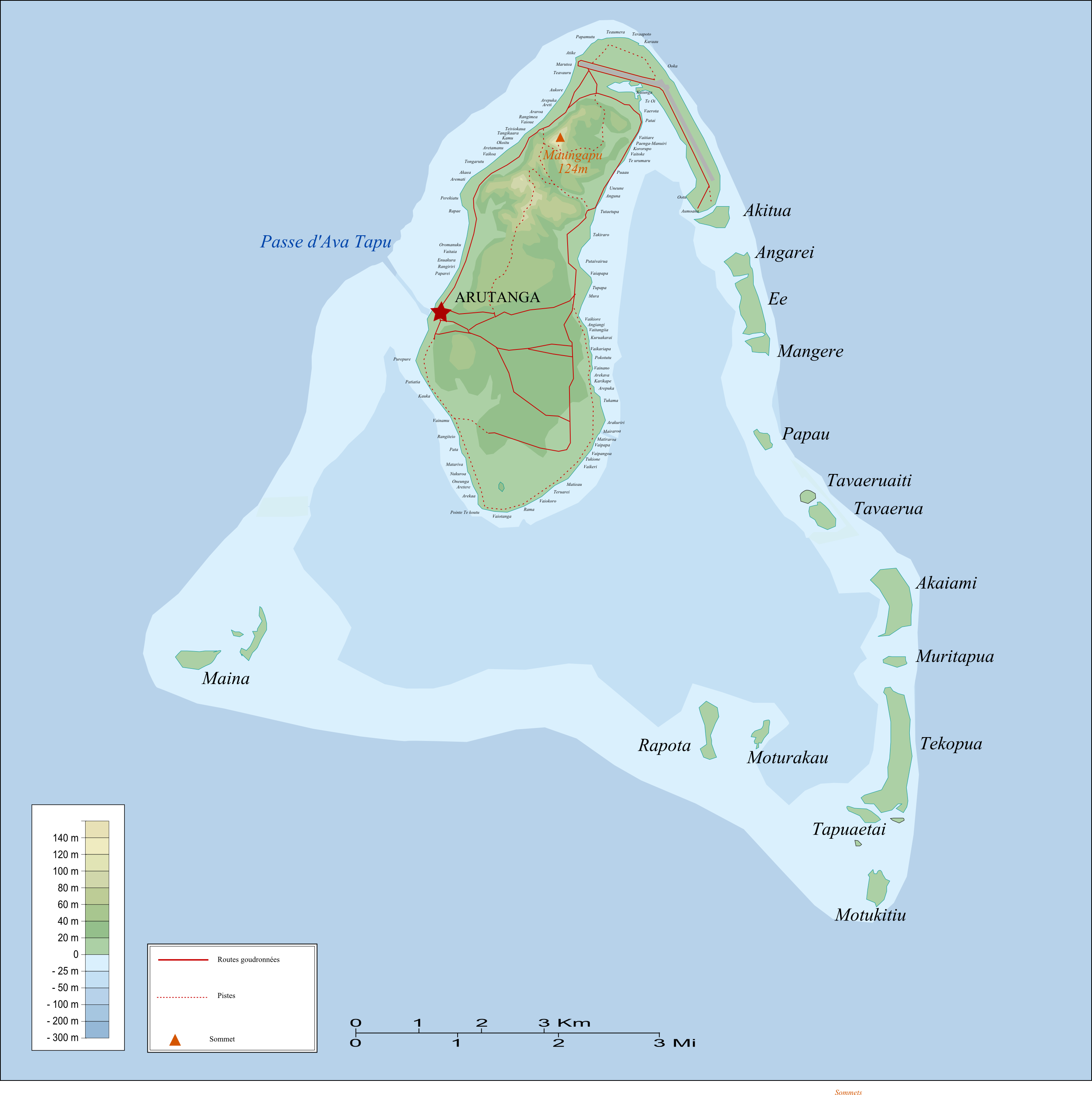
Topographic map of Aitutaki

Muritapua is one of 22 islands in the Aitutaki atoll of the Cook Islands. It is a small islet located on the eastern perimeter of Aitutaki Lagoon between the larger islands of Akaiami and Tekopua, six kilometres (3.7 mi) to the southeast of the main island of Aitutaki. The island is 360 metres (1,180 ft) long and 150 metres (490 ft) wide.
