= Aitutaki =

Island in the Cook Islands

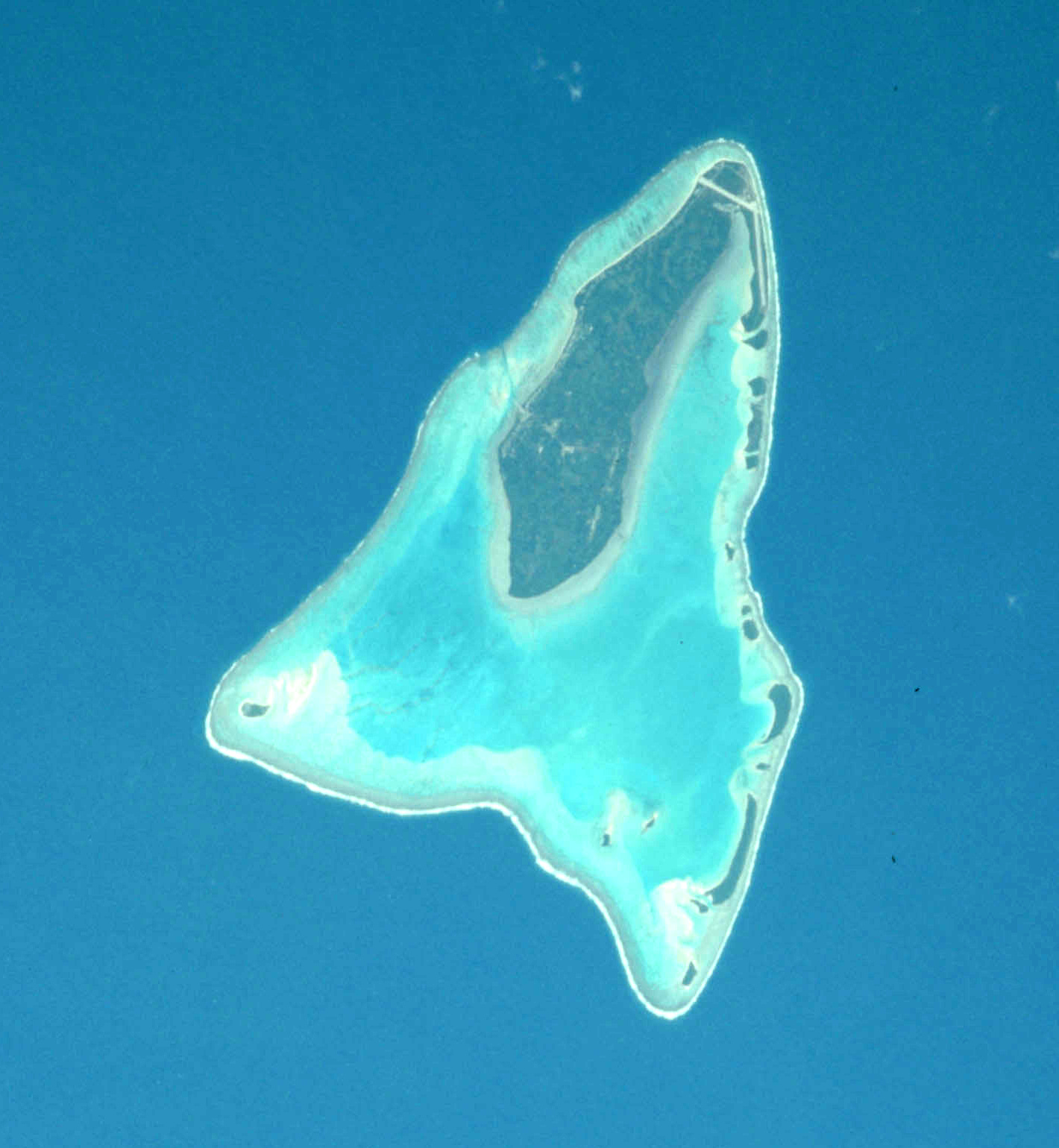
- Aitutaki Atoll in 1975

- Aitutaki highlighted in red in the Cook Island

Geography
- Location: Central-Southern Pacific Ocean
- Coordinates: 18.85°S 159.79°W
- Archipelago: Cook Islands
- Total islands: 15
- Area: 18.3 km^{2} (7.1 sq mi)

Administration
- Cook Islands
- Largest settlement: Arutanga

Demographics
- Population: 1,782 (2021)
- Pop. density: 97/km^{2} (251/sq mi)

Aitutaki, also traditionally known as Araʻura and Utataki, is the second most-populated island in the Cook Islands, after Rarotonga. It is an "almost atoll", with fifteen islets in a lagoon adjacent to the main island. Total land area is 18.05 km^{2} (6.97 sq mi), and the lagoon has an area of between 50 and 74 km^{2} (19 and 29 sq mi). A major tourist destination, Aitutaki is the second most visited island of the Cook Islands archipelago.

The main village is Arutanga (Arutunga) on the west side.

== Geography ==
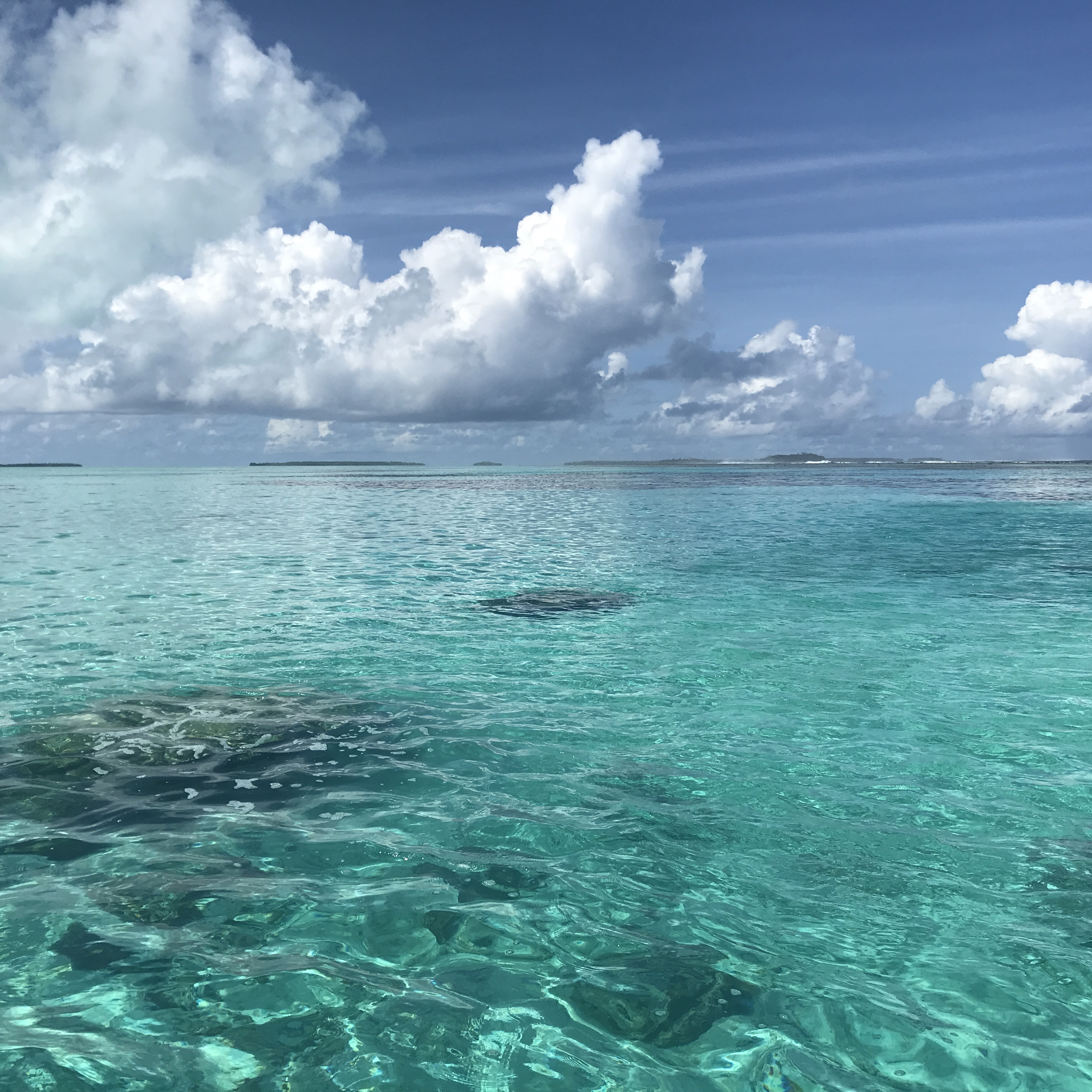
Atoll

Aitutaki is sometimes described as an "almost atoll", for it consists of a lagoon within an encircling atoll, with a significant area of high land on one side. It has a maximum elevation of approximately 123 metres (404 ft) with the hill known as Maunga Pu close to its northernmost point. The land area of the atoll is 18.05 km^{2} (6.97 sq mi), of which the main island occupies 16.8 km^{2} (6.5 sq mi). The Ootu Peninsula, protruding east from the main island in a southerly direction along the eastern rim of the reef, makes up 1.75 km^{2} (0.68 sq mi) of the main island. For the lagoon, area figures between 50 and 74 km^{2} (19 and 29 sq mi) are found. Satellite image measurement suggests that the larger figure also includes the reef flat, which is commonly not considered part of a lagoon.

The barrier reef that forms the basis of Aitutaki is roughly the shape of an equilateral triangle with sides 12 kilometres (7.5 mi) in length. The southern edge of the triangle is almost totally below the surface of the ocean, and the eastern side is composed of a string of small islands including Mangere, Akaiami, and Tekopua.

The western side of the atoll contains many of Aitutaki's important features, including a boat passage through the barrier reef, allowing for anchorage close to shore at Arutanga. Towards the south of the side is a small break in the barrier reef, allowing access for small boats to the lagoon, which covers most of the southern part of the triangle. Further to the north is the bulk of the main island. Its fertile volcanic soil provides tropical fruits and vegetables. Two of Aitutaki's 15 islets (motus) are also volcanic; the rest are made of coral.

Aitutaki Airport is near the triangle's northern point. The southeastern part of the lagoon near Akaiami was once used as a landing area for TEAL flying boats on the "coral route".

== History ==
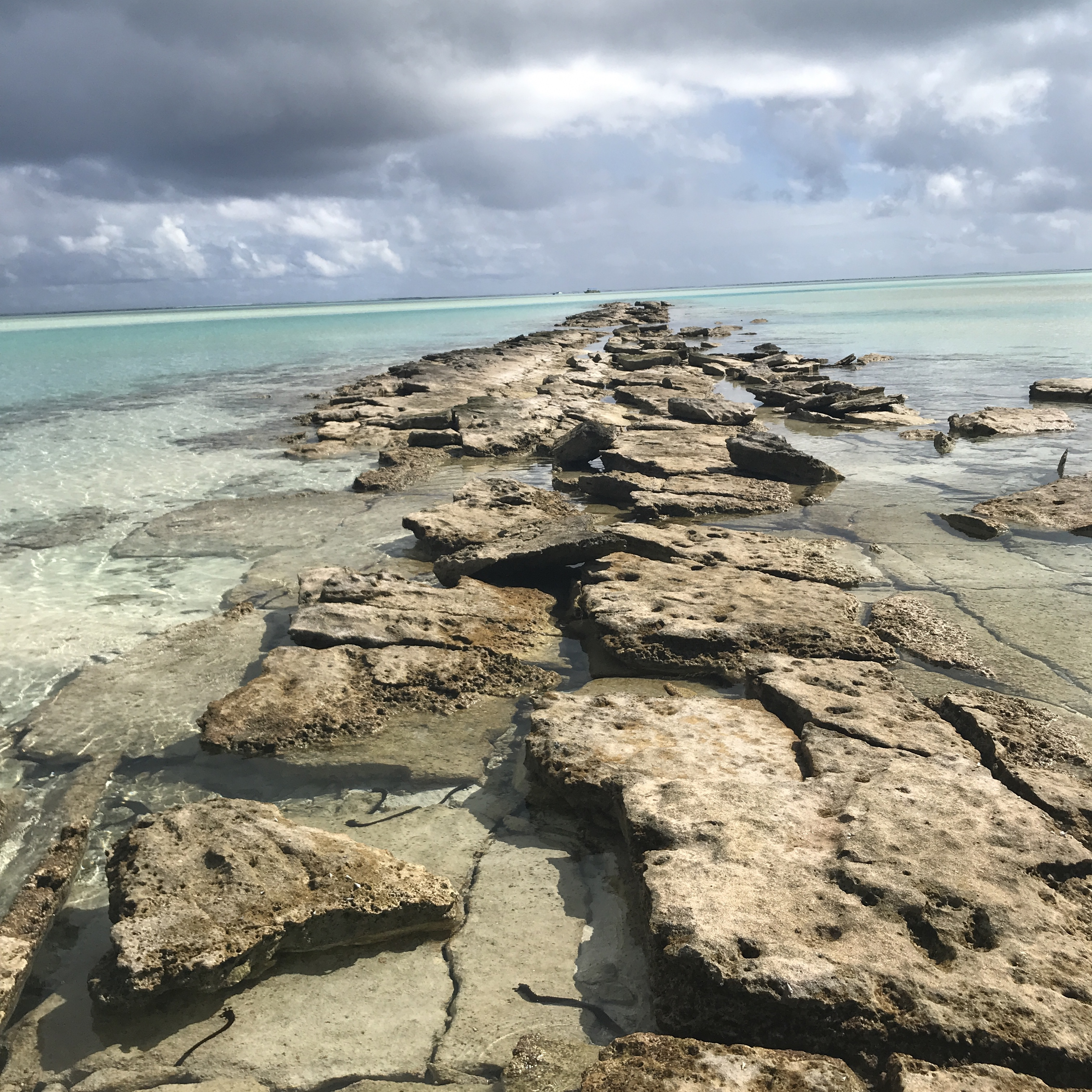
Looking out across the atoll

Polynesians first settled Aitutaki around AD 1225–1430. They maintained voyaging contact over a wide area, for the geochemical source of basalt adze heads found in this island can be traced back to quarries on Samoa to the west and the Society Islands to the east. According to oral tradition, the island was named by Te Erui, who raised it from the ocean after traveling from Avaiki. Other traditions identify various settlers, including Ru, Te Munakorero, Kai, Ui-tario, and Ruatapu.

The first known European contact was with Captain Bligh and the crew of HMS Bounty when they also arrived in Aitutaki on 11 April 1789, prior to the infamous mutiny.

Aitutaki was the first of the Cook Islands to practice Christianity, after London Missionary Society (LMS) missionary John Williams visited in 1821. The oldest church in the country, the Cook Islands Christian Church in Arutanga, was built by Papeiha (Bora Bora) and Vahapata (Raiatea), two LMS teachers Williams had left behind.

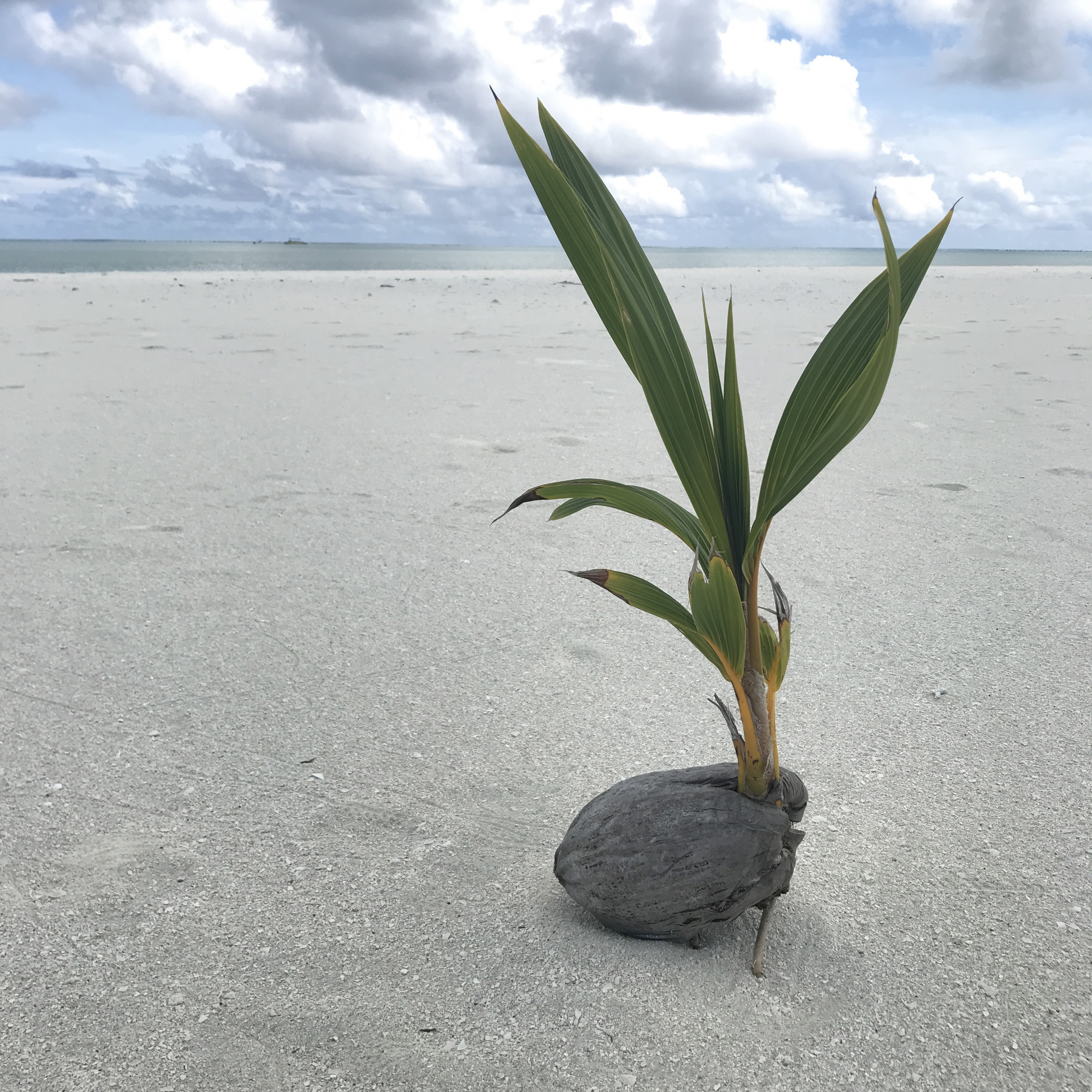
Coconut on a white sand beach in Aitutaki

On 8–9 October 1900 seven instruments of cession of Rarotonga and other islands were signed by their chiefs and people; and by a British Proclamation issued at the same time the cessions were accepted, the islands being declared parts of Her Britannic Majesty's dominions. Uniquely, these instruments did not include Aitutaki. It appears that, though the inhabitants of Aitutaki regarded themselves as British subjects, the Crown's title was uncertain, and the island was formally annexed by Proclamation dated 9 October 1900. It was the only island in the Cook Islands that was annexed rather than ceded.

In 1942 New Zealand and American forces were stationed on the island. The American engineering firm Sverdrup & Parcel, the New Zealand Ministry of Works, US military personnel and many locals combined to build two airstrips which were completed on 14 November 1942. This airport, and one on the northernmost Penrhyn Island, were to be used as bases by the Allies during World War II. The first aircraft, an American light bomber, landed on 22 November 1942. When the war ended some of the servicemen remained and married the locals.

During the 1950s Aitutaki's lagoon was used as a stopover for TEAL (Tasman Empire Airways Limited) flying boats on the famous Coral Route. The islet of Akaiami was used as a resting stop for passengers, who often lay about until the aircraft was refueled for two hours. These operations ceased in 1960, and the only reminder are the remains of the purpose-built jetty on Akaiami. The flying boat Aranui, which was part of this service, is now on display at the Museum of Transport and Technology in Auckland, New Zealand.

The island was damaged by a tropical cyclone in February 1962, with 12 houses destroyed and several school classrooms damaged at Araura School.

Commercial banana-growing was introduced to the island in the late 1960s, but suffered a rapid decline due to wind damage, low prices, and inadequate shipping. The industry was revived in the late 1970s, but collapsed after New Zealand adopted Rogernomics and removed privileged market access. A tourism boom began in the early 1990s, with tourist numbers doubling to 10,000 visitors a year in 1994.

On 10–11 February 2010, Aitutaki was hit by Cyclone Pat. The high winds of the storm ripped the roofs off many houses and damaged other structures, including a school building and a hospital building. At least 60% of houses were damaged. There were a few minor injuries, but no reported deaths. An Air Force Hercules cargo plane and an army engineering team were provided by New Zealand along with an initial $200,000. Cook Island MP Teina Bishop said "New Zealand aid should have been sent to the devastated area much sooner".

In June 2010 the island was nominated "the world's most beautiful island" by Tony Wheeler the founder of Lonely Planet travel guide.

The delegates of the 2012 Pacific Islands Forum, which had its main venue in Rarotonga, travelled to One Foot Island for a 2-day retreat.

== Demographics and settlement ==
Historical population
Year	Pop.	±%
1906	1,162	—
1916	1,302	+12.0%
1926	1,431	+9.9%
1936	1,719	+20.1%
1951	2,396	+39.4%
1961	2,582	+7.8%
1966	2,579	−0.1%
1976	2,423	−6.0%
1986	2,390	−1.4%
1996	2,389	−0.0%
2001	1,946	−18.5%
2006	2,235	+14.9%
2011	2,038	−8.8%
2016	1,941	−4.8%
2021	1,782	−8.2%

The population of Aitutaki was 1,782 in 2021.

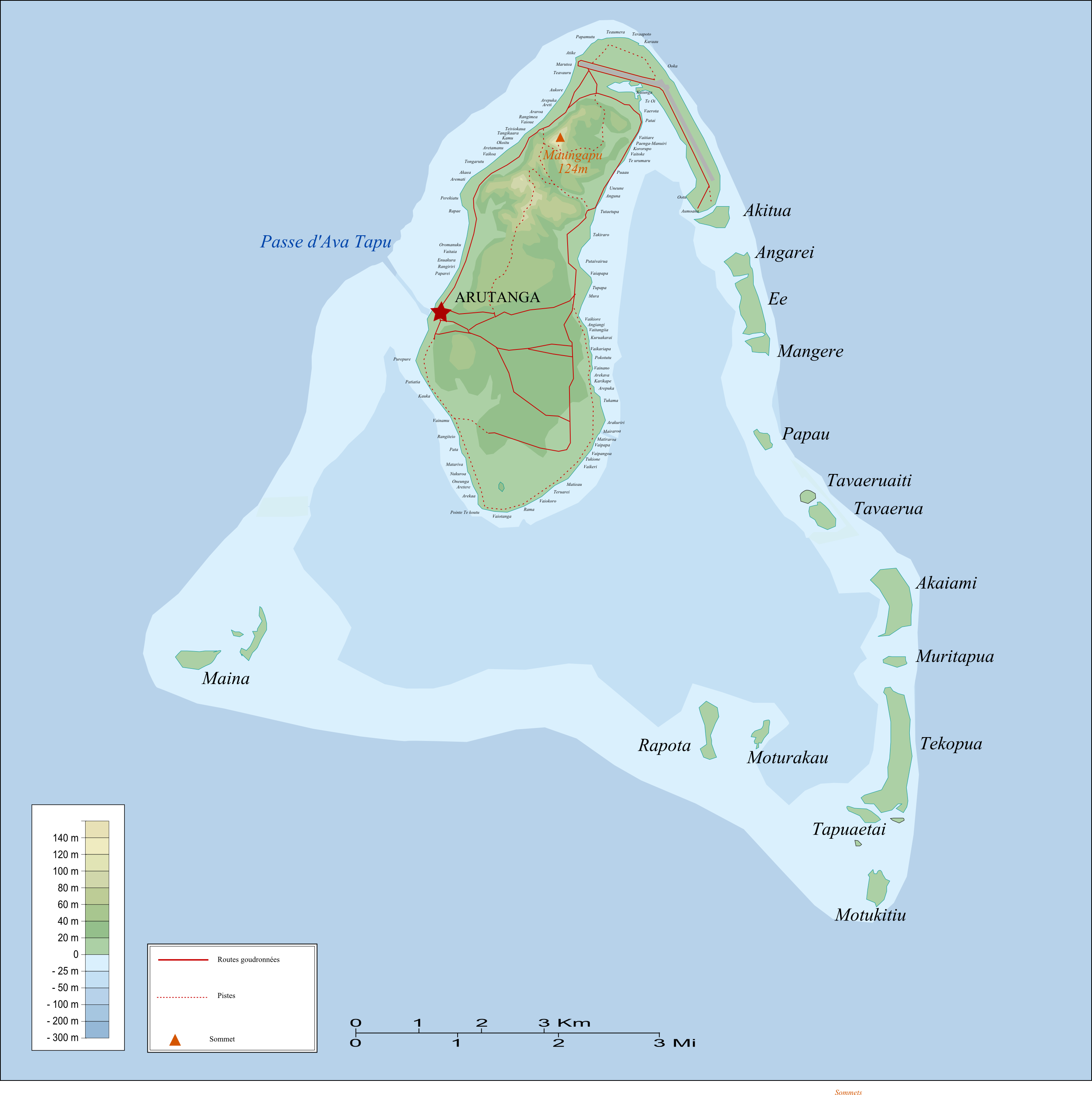
Topographic map of Aitutaki

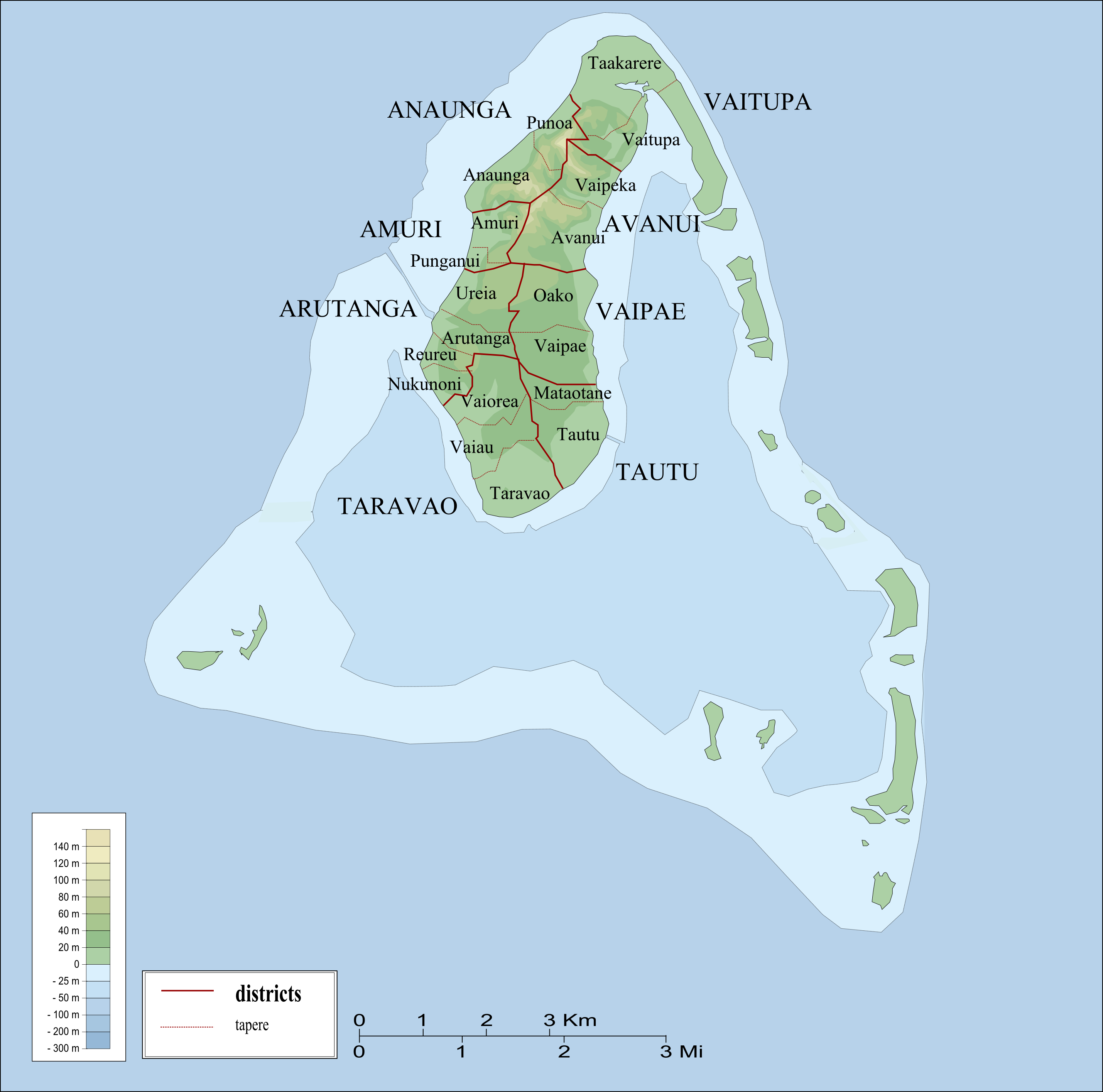
Districts and tapere of Aitutaki according to the constitution

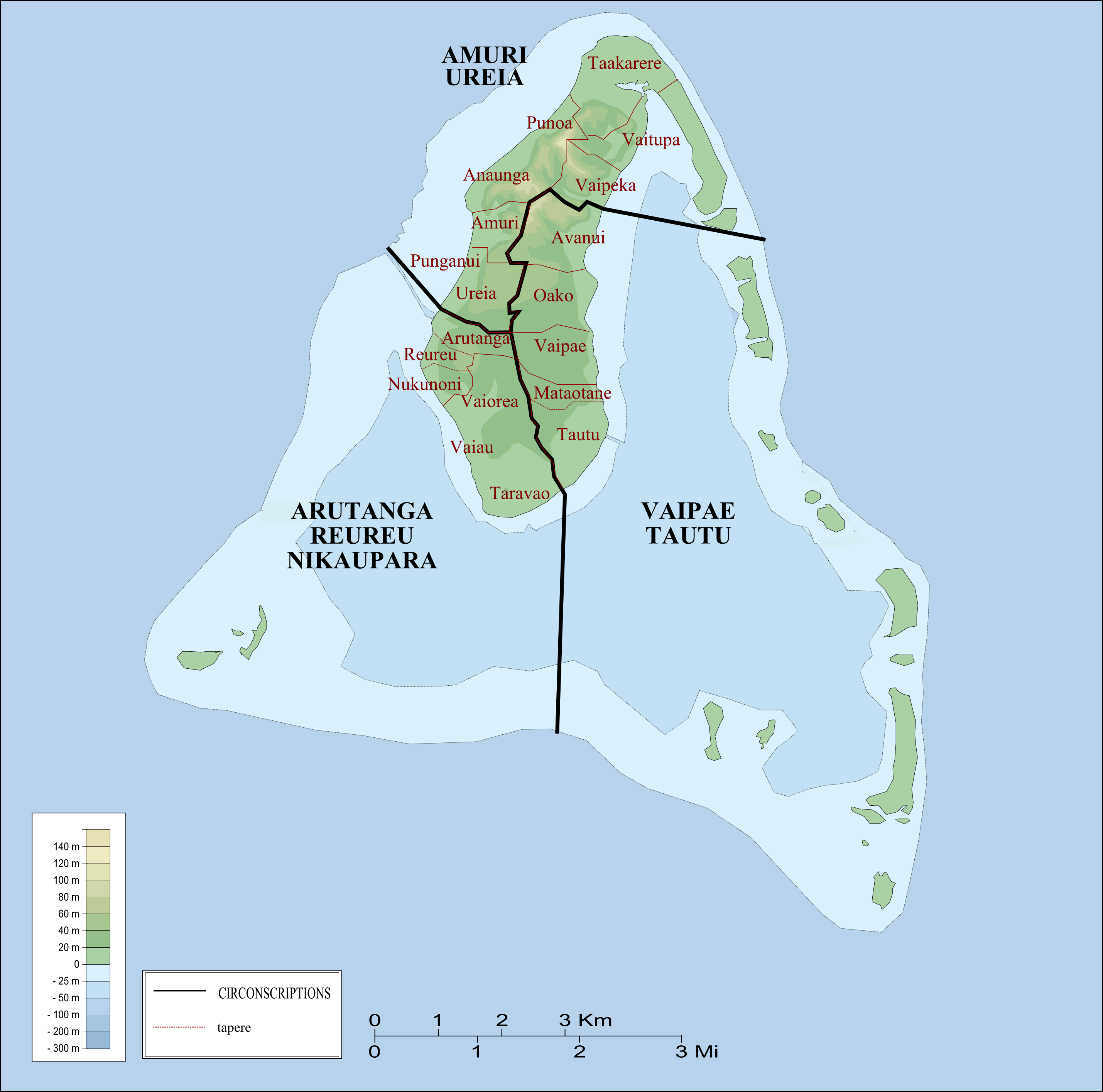
Electoral circonscriptions of Aitutaki

Aitutaki is subdivided in 8 districts. The districts are further subdivided into 19 tapere (land holdings by tribe lineages).

The eight districts are:

1. Amuri (Te Upoko Enua)
2. Ureia (Uriuri A Punga)
3. Arutanga (Rutanga O Te Toa)
4. Reureu (Te Mata O Teerui)
5. Nikaupara (Te Maru O Toi)
6. Vaipae (Te Vaipaepae O Pau)
7. Tautu (Titi Ai Tonga)
8. Vaipeka (Te Arekarioi)

The eight districts are subdivided into 19 tapere as follows:

- Amuri District
  - Amuri Tapere
  - Punganui Tapere
- Anaunga District
  - Anaunga Tapere
  - Punoa Tapere
- Arutanga District
  - Arutanga Tapere
  - Reureu Tapere
  - Nukunoni Tapere
  - Ureia Tapere
- Avanui District
  - Avanui Tapere
  - Vaipeka Tapere
- Taravao District
  - Taravao Tapere
  - Vaiau Tapere
  - Vaiorea Tapere
- Tautu District
  - Mataotane Tapere
  - Tautu Tapere
- Vaipae District
  - Oako Tapere
  - Vaipae Tapere
- Vaitupa District
  - Taakarere Tapere
  - Vaitupa Tapere

== Economy ==
Aitutaki is the second largest tourist destination in the Cook Islands, after Rarotonga, receiving 38,777 visitors in 2018. Tourism dominates the economy, with 36% of the labour force employed in the restaurant and accommodation sector. The government is the next largest employer, employing 21%, with retail and wholesale employing 18% and agriculture, forestry and fishing 6%.

Aitutaki is connected to the rest of the Cook Islands by Aitutaki Airport and a port at Arutanga. In September 2020 Aitutaki was connected to the Manatua One Polynesia Fibre Cable, becoming one of the smallest fibre-connected islands in the world. In 2019 a 750 kW solar array was installed as part of a plan to transition the island to 100% renewable energy. The sole healthcare provider is Aitutaki Hospital.

Aitutaki was the filming location for the film The Silent One (1984). Since 2000 Aitutaki has served as a filming location for a variety of TV shows, including Shipwrecked, Survivor: Cook Islands, and Survivorman.

== Ecology ==
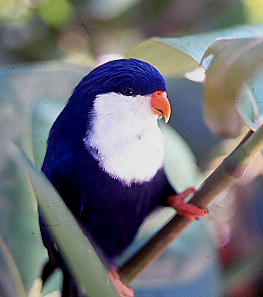
Blue lorikeet

=== Flora ===
The flora of Aitutaki is highly modified, and on the main island only a few patches of degraded native forest survive near the airstrip. The main island's ecology can be divided into four zones. The coastal flat is dominated by Guettarda speciosa, coconuts, Hibiscus, Pandanus, and Hernandia moerenhoutiana. The slopes are mostly Hibiscus tiliaceus interspersed with taro patches. The inland plateau is extensively cultivated, with plantations of coconuts, banana, citrus, and other food plants, as well as assorted introduced decorative shrubs. The high ground on the island was cleared during World War 2 for military installations and now consists of grasses and weedy species. The motu have Pemphis acidula scrub on the seaward side, phasing to Suriana scrub and coconut forest, with the volcanic islands containing forests of Calophyllum inophyllum which are not found on the other motu.

=== Fauna ===
Aitutaki is home to numerous species of sea- and shorebirds, including the red-tailed tropicbird, white-tailed tropicbird, brown booby, great frigatebird, brown noddy, black noddy, white tern, and Pacific reef heron. Land birds include the common myna and the blue lorikeet. The latter were badly affected by Cyclone Pat, losing over 50% of their population and virtually all juveniles. Subfossil remains show that Kuhl's lorikeet, the spotless crake, and an undescribed species of whistling duck once existed on Aitutaki. The main island has been designated an Important Bird Area (IBA) by BirdLife International because it supports a population of blue lorikeets.

== Minor islands ==
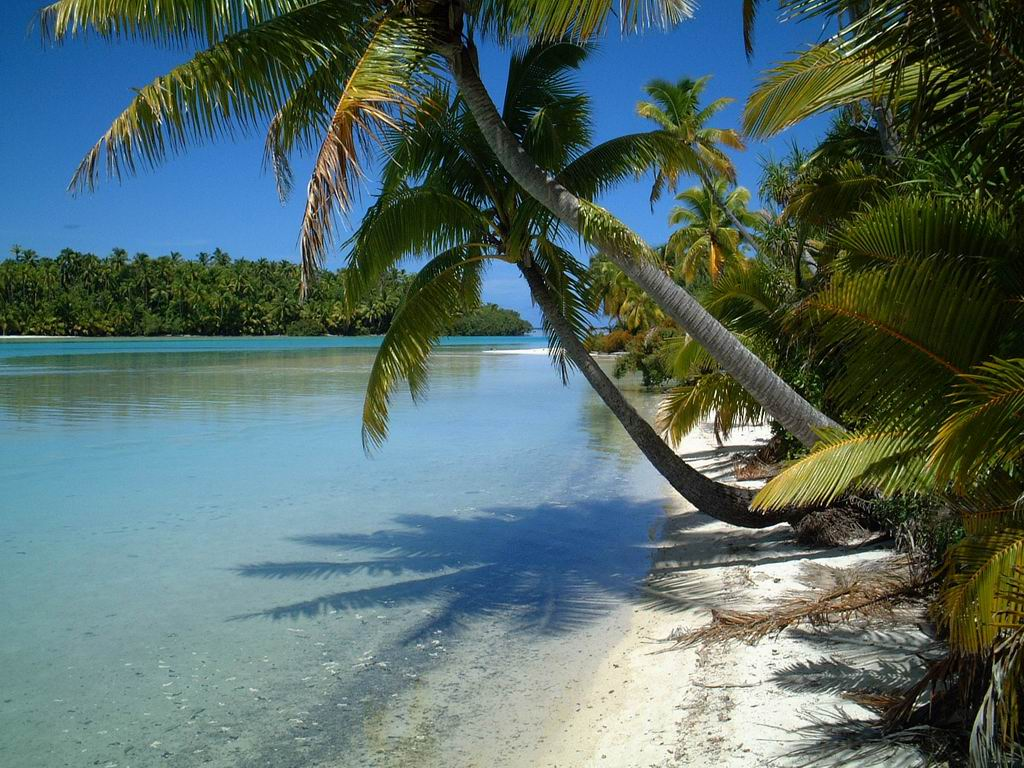
Tapuaetai (One Foot Island) in the southern part of Aitutaki Atoll

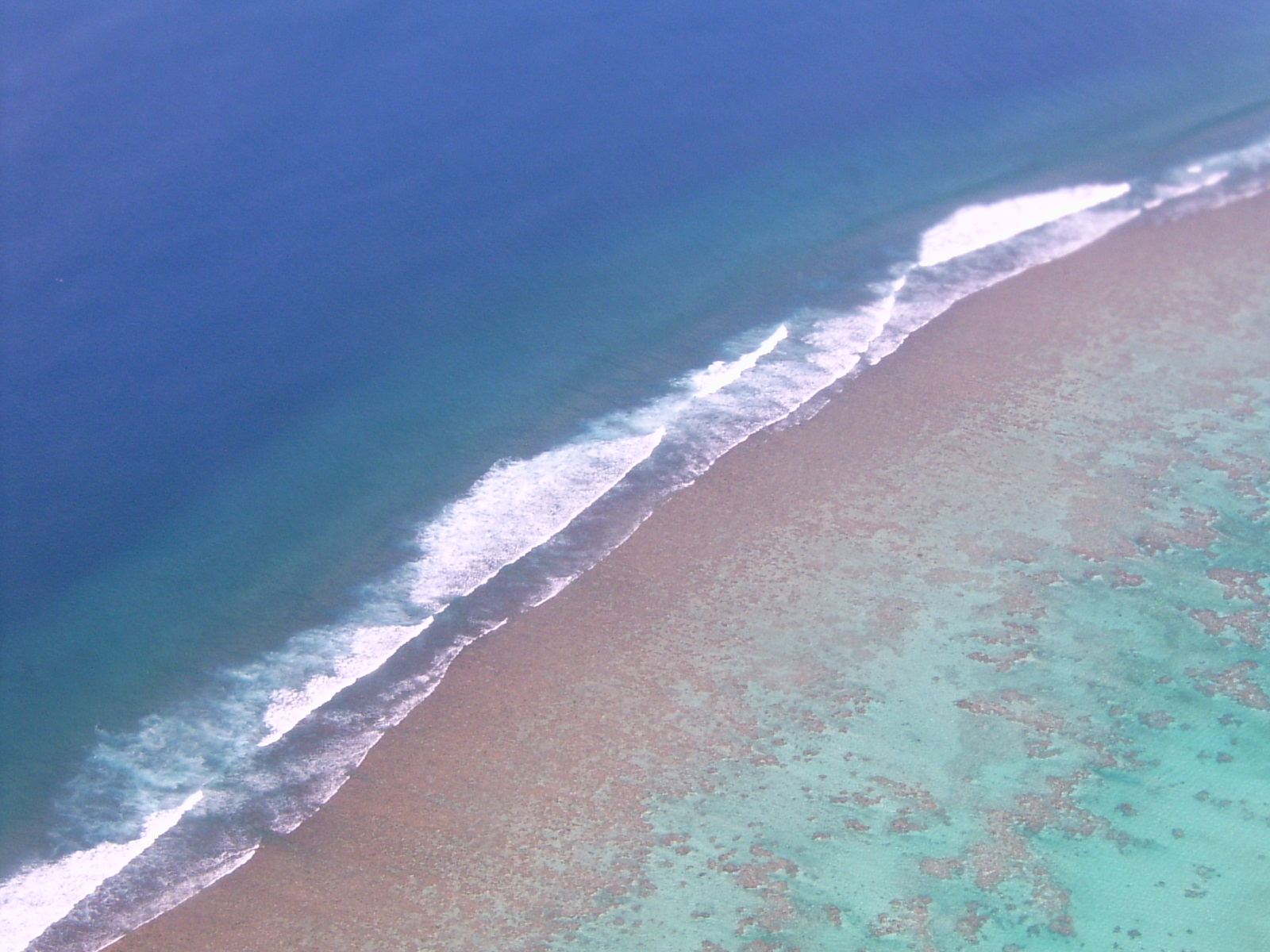
A reef outside of Aitutaki

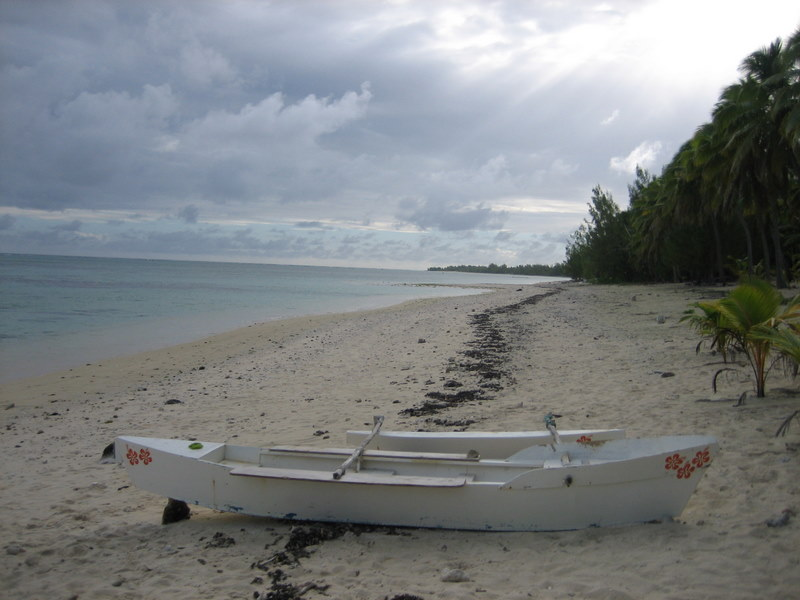
A beach on Aitutaki

The main island of Aitutaki occupies the northern part of the atoll, which is roughly triangular in shape. The minor islands form part of the perimeter of the lagoon. All islands, including the main island and its peninsula Ootu, are listed starting clockwise from the northernmost point of the atoll:

Island	Type	Area		Location
Island	Type	(ha)	(acre)	Location
Aitutaki	volcanic main island	16,800	42,000	18°51′32″S 159°47′01″W
Ootu	motu peninsula	175	430	
Akitua	motu	14.86	36.7	18°51′00″S 159°45′25″W
Angarei	motu	13.07	32.3	18°51′25″S 159°45′12″W
Ee (Niura)	motu	29.21	72.2	
Mangere	motu	8.54	21.1	
Papau	motu	5.26	13.0	
Tavaerua Iti	motu	4.12	10.2	
Tavaerua	motu	12.47	30.8	
Akaiami	motu	41.91	103.6	
Muritapua	motu	4.04	10.0	
Tekopua	motu	71.29	176.2	
Tapuaetai (One Foot Island)	motu	5.96	14.7	
Tapuaeta cay	sand cay	0.95	2.3	
Motukitiu	motu	11.47	28.3	
Moturakau	volcanic	3.86	9.5	
Rapota	volcanic	3.1	7.7	
Maina	sand cay	16.96	41.9	
Aitutaki Atoll	near-atoll	18,050	44,600	

Tapuaetai (One Foot Island), a small islet in the south-east of the lagoon, is often said to be the most important attraction. It is regarded as providing the visitor with the best views of the Aitutaki lagoon and, depending on the tide, one is able to walk on a sandbank a decent distance away from Tapuaetai. The trip to this island is the most frequented trip available on Aitutaki. One Foot Island was awarded "Australasia's Leading Beach" at the World Travel Awards held in Sydney in June 2008.

Ootu Peninsula is of coral formation, but attached to the main volcanic island, thus a peninsula. If it were an island, it would be the largest of the minor islands. Ootu Peninsula does belong to tapere and district of Vaitupa. The minor islands are not allocated to any districts or tapere, but they do form part of the larger constituencies.

All minor islets, except Akitua and Maina, are part of Vaipae–Tautu Constituency. Akitua is part of Amuri–Ureia Constituency, as is Ootu Peninsula, just north of Akitua. Maina is part of Arutanga–Reureu–Nikaupara Constituency. The main island is equally divided among the three constituencies Arutanga-Reureu-Nikaupara (southwest), Vaipae-Tautu (southeast), and Amuri-Ureia (north).

== Culture ==
=== Sport ===
The most popular sports on Aitutaki are rugby union and netball, followed closely by volleyball. With a population of 2,000 residing on the island and 50,000 overseas, there are four clubs on Aitutaki and eight teams (each club having a first team and a reserve team). The best players on the island play for the Aitutaki island team against their main rivals Rarotonga.

=== Education ===
Araura College is the only secondary school. It has approximately 200 students, from Year 7 (Form 1) to Year 13 (Form 7).

The island has two government primary schools and one church school. The largest is Araura Primary School, which caters for the mostly populated part of the island. Vaitau Primary School caters mostly for the Vaipae and Tautu villages. Tekaaroa Adventist School is a special character private school run by the Seventh-day Adventist Church.
