= Tapuaetai =

Place in Aitutaki, Cook Islands

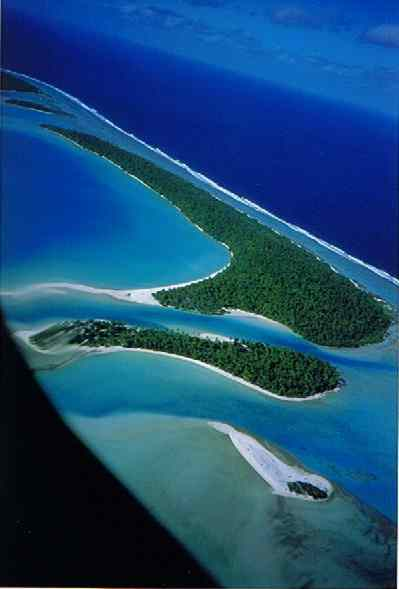
- Aerial view of Tekopua and Tapuaetai
- Interactive map of Tapuaetai

Geography
- Location: Pacific Ocean
- Coordinates: 18.9376°S 159.7346°W

Administration
- Cook Islands
- Atoll: Aitutaki

Additional information
- Time zone: CKT (UTC– 10:00)
- Area code: +682

Tapuaetai (tapuae: footprint; ta'i: one), or "One Foot Island", is one of 22 islands in the Aitutaki atoll of the Cook Islands. It is located on the southeastern perimeter of Aitutaki Lagoon immediately to the southwest of the larger island of Tekopua, seven kilometres (4.3 mi) to the east of the main island of Aitutaki. The island is 570 metres (1,870 ft) long and up to 210 metres (690 ft) wide, with an average elevation of 1.5 metres (4 ft 11 in) above sea level.

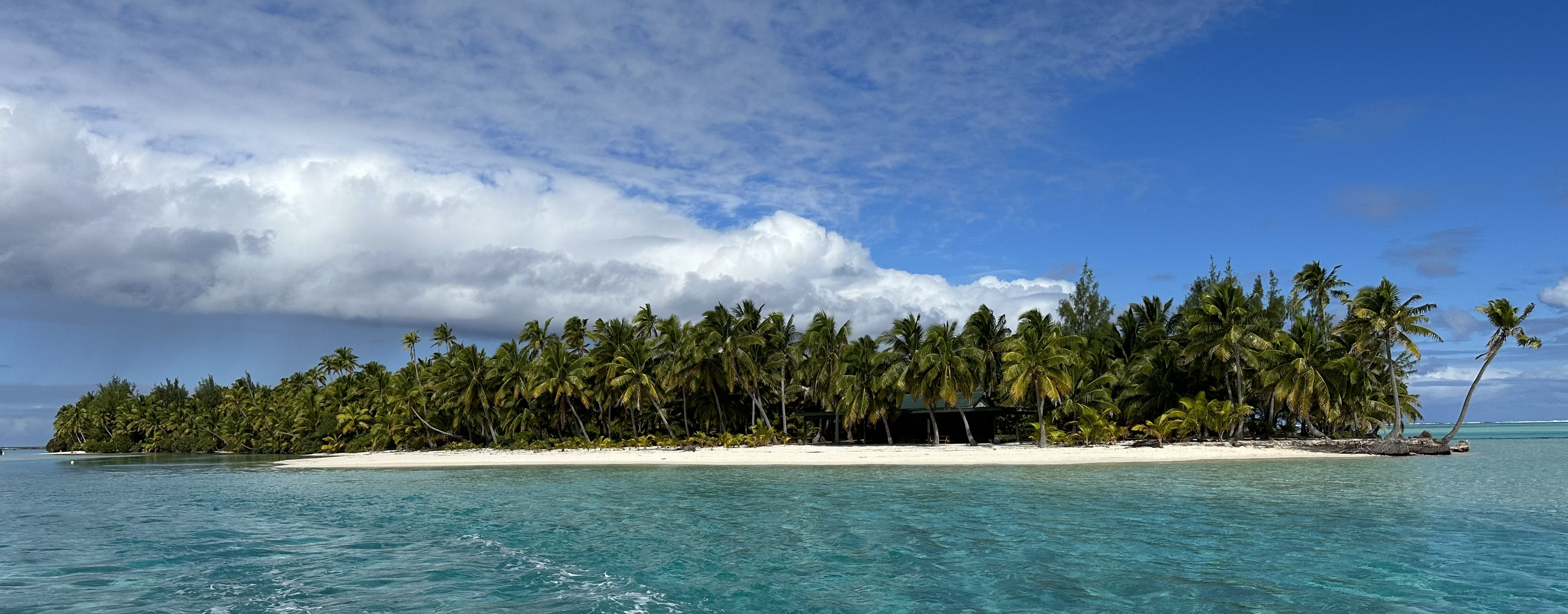
Tapuaetai

One Foot Island was awarded "Australasia's Leading Beach" at the World Travel Awards held in Sydney in June 2008.
