= Tekopua =

Island of the Cook Islands

Coordinates: 18.9286°S 159.7294°W

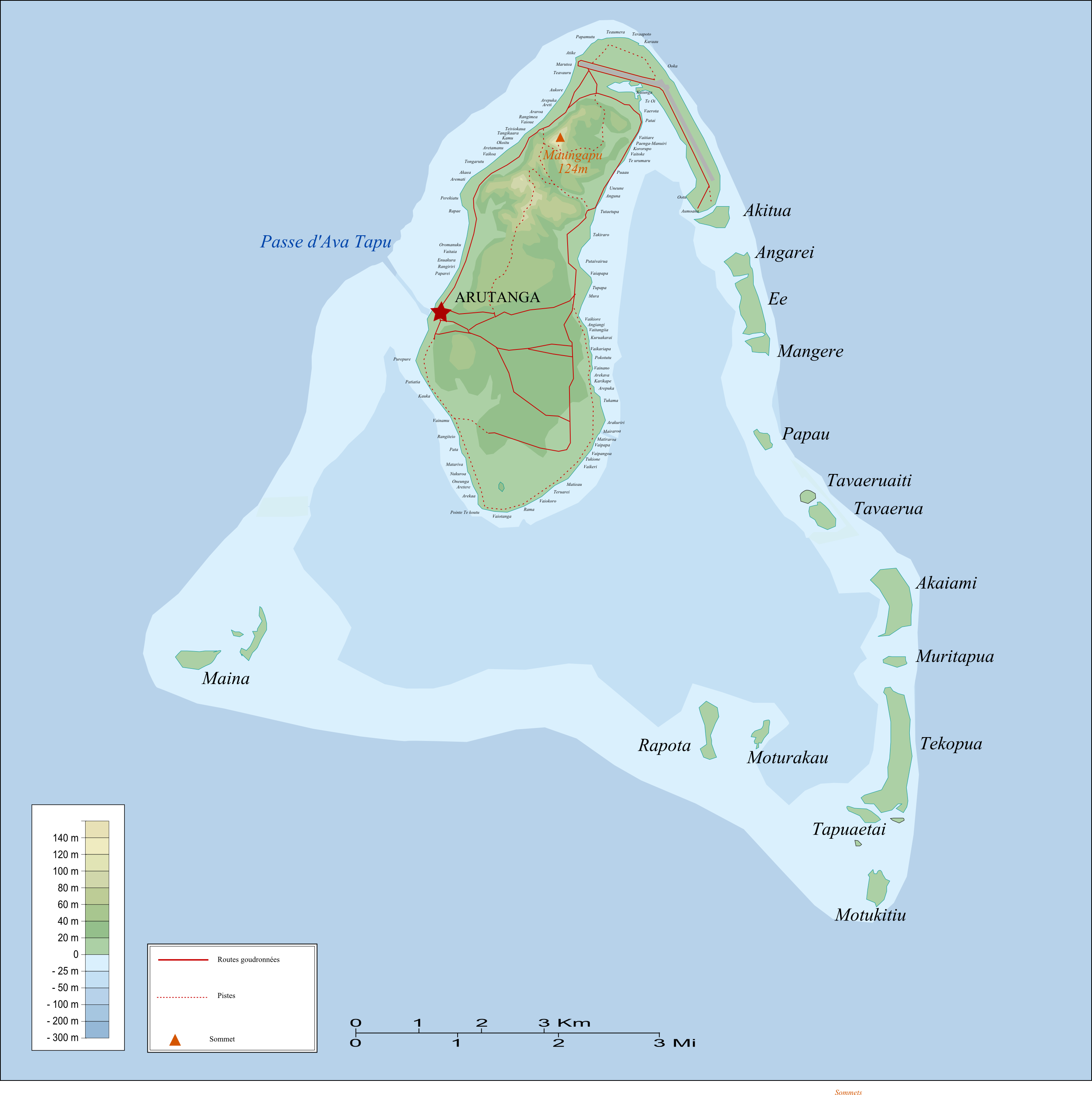
Topographic map of Aitutaki

Tekopua is one of 22 islands in the Aitutaki atoll of the Cook Islands. It is located on the southeastern perimeter of Aitutaki Lagoon between the smaller islands of Muritapua and Tapuaetai, seven kilometres (4.3 mi) to the southeast of the main island of Aitutaki. The island is the largest of the Aitutaki atoll, measuring 2,250 metres (7,380 ft) long and up to 480 metres (1,570 ft) wide.
