= Harland (name) =

Harland is both a surname and a given name. The name Harland is of Anglo-Saxon origins. It can be traced back to the Midlands as one of the earliest recorded surnames in the United Kingdom. Notable people with the name include:

== Surname ==
- Albert Harland (1869–1957), British politician
- Alfie Harland (1897–1968), Irish footballer
- Barbara Harland (1925–2020), American nutritionist
- Bob Harland (footballer) (1916–2006), Australian rules footballer
- Bruce Harland (born 1939), Australian international rugby union player
- Bryce Harland (1931–2006), New Zealand diplomat and academic
- Darren Harland (born 1979), English cricketer
- David Harland (born 1962), New Zealand diplomat
- David M. Harland (born 1955), British writer and space historian
- Edward Harland (1831–1895), English shipbuilder and politician
- Edward Harland (general) (1832–1915), American general
- Eric Harland (born 1978), American jazz drummer
- Georgina Harland (born 1978), British modern pentathlete
- Henry Harland (1861–1905), American novelist
- Henry Harland (politician) (1876–1945), British politician
- Ian Harland (1932–2008), British bishop
- James Penrose Harland (1891–1973), American archaeologist
- John Harland (1806–1868), English reporter and antiquarian
- John Harland (golfer) (born c. 1870), English golfer
- Kurt Harland (born 1963), American singer-songwriter
- Lawrence Harland (1905–1977), Archdeacon of Rochester 1951–1969
- Louisa Harland (born 1993 or 1994), Irish actress
- Marion Harland, pen name of Mary Terhune
- Martin Harland (born 1963), Australian bobsledder
- Maurice Harland (1896–1986), English Anglican bishop
- Paul Harland (1960–2003), Dutch writer
- Philip Harland, New Zealand cyclist
- Reginald Harland (1920–2013), Royal Air Force Air Marshal
- Robert Harland (1935–2023), American film, stage and television actor
- Richard Harland (born 1947), Australian writer
- Shelley Harland, English singer-songwriter
- Stan Harland (1940–2001), English footballer and manager
- Sydney Harland (1891–1982), Agricultural botanist and geneticist
- Tommy Harland (born 1942), English cricketer
- W. Brian Harland (1917–2003), British geologist
- William Arthur Harland (1926–1985), Northern-Irish forensic scientist
- William Charles Harland (1803–1863), British politician

== Given name ==
- Harland Bartholomew (1889–1989), American urban planner
- Harland Bowden (1873–1927), British engineer and politician
- Harland Braun (born 1942), American lawyer
- Harland Carl (1931–2023), American football player
- Harland C. Clark (1917–1982), American politician
- Harland Dixon (1885–1969), Canadian tap dancer
- Harland Epps, American astronomer
- Harland E. Everson (1917–1992), American politician
- Harland C. Forbes (1898–1990), President and chairman of Con Edison
- Harland Gunn (born 1989), American football player
- Harland Bradley Howe (1873–1946), American judge
- Harland A. McPhetres (1892–1972), American politician
- Harland Miller (born 1964), English writer & artist
- Harland Rowe (1896–1969), American baseball player
- Harland David Sanders (1890–1980), American entrepreneur
- Harland Svare (1930–2020), American football player and coach
- Harland Whitmore (1939–2022), American economist
- Harland Williams (born 1962), Canadian-American comedian and actor
- Harland G. Wood (1907–1991), American biochemist
- Harland Ah You (born 1972), American gridiron football player

== See also ==
- Harland (disambiguation)
- Harlan, given name and surname
