= Hadland =

Hadland is a surname. Notable people with the surname include:

- Phil Hadland (born 1980), English footballer and manager
- Sarah Hadland (born 1971), English actress
- Scott Hadland (born 1981), American physician and scientist
- Selina Hadland (1838–1919), British headmistress

== See also ==
- Haaland
- Harland (name)
