= Harland =

Harland may refer to:

- Harland (name), including a list of people with the surname and given name
- Parker Boudreaux (born 1988), American wrestler with the ring name Harland
- John H. Harland Company, an American printing company
- HMS Cayman, a British frigate 1944–1946, built to be USS Harland

== See also ==
- Harland & Wolff, a British shipbuilding and fabrication company
- Harland & Wolff Welders F.C., a Northern Irish football club
- Harlan (disambiguation)
- Harlond (disambiguation)
