= Harlan (disambiguation) =

Harlan is a given name and a surname.

Harlan may also refer to:

== Places ==
=== United States ===
- Harlan, Indiana, an unincorporated census-designated place
- Harlan, Iowa, a city
- Harlan, Kansas, an unincorporated community
- Harlan, Kentucky, a city
- Harlan, Michigan, an unincorporated community
- Harlan, Oregon, an unincorporated community
- Harlan County, Kentucky
- Harlan County, Nebraska
- Harlan Township, Fayette County, Iowa
- Harlan Township, Decatur County, Kansas
- Harlan Township, Warren County, Ohio

=== Moon ===
- Harlan (crater)

== Other uses ==
- Harlan (company), full name Harlan Sprague Dawley Inc., suppliers of animals and other services to laboratories
- Harlan Estate, California cult wine producer
- Harlan Community Academy High School, Chicago, Illinois
- Harlan Hall, a historic opera house in Marshall, Illinois
- Harlan – In the Shadow of Jew Süss, a 2008 documentary film about Nazi filmmaker Veit Harlan
- Justice Harlan (disambiguation)
