= Bournemouth Collegiate School =

School in Dorset, England

- Schola Collegiatus Bornmuthensis

Location
- College Road; Bournemouth, Dorset, BH5 2DY; England; 50.7240°N 1.8251°W

Information
- Former names: Wentworth College
- Type: Private day and boarding school
- Motto: “Veritas Omnia Vincet” (The Truth Conquers All)
- Religious affiliation: Christianity
- Established: 1895; 131 years ago (Uplands School); 1899; 127 years ago (Wentworth College); 2009; 17 years ago (merger)
- Department for Education URN: 113937 Tables
- Headmaster: Maria Coulter
- Gender: Coeducational
- Age: 3 to 18
- Enrolment: 540~
- Houses: Purbeck; Studland; Brownsea; Solent; Alum
- Colour: Blue
- Website: http://www.bournemouthcollegiateschool.co.uk/

Bournemouth Collegiate School is a coeducational private day and boarding school based on two sites in Poole and Bournemouth, Dorset on the southern coast of England. The prep school (ages 2–11) is located in Poole and the senior school (ages 11–18) in the Southbourne West-Boscombe East-Pokesdown South area. The school is the only coeducational independent school in the Bournemouth and Poole area.

The school operates on split sites as a result of a merger between two independent schools, Wentworth College (Bournemouth) and Uplands School (Poole). The prep school is situated at the old Uplands site and the senior school at Wentworth.

== History ==
Bournemouth Collegiate School was created in September 2009 by the merger of Wentworth College in Bournemouth and Uplands School in Poole. Wentworth College had joined the United Church Schools Trust in August 2008, and Uplands School in June 2009 – it was UCST that brought the two together to create a new school.

=== Uplands School ===
Uplands was an independent school in Poole founded in 1895 as Bourne School for Girls. It moved to various places before and after World War II and later became coeducational.

=== Wentworth College ===
Wentworth College was previously an independent day and boarding school for girls. It took its name from Wentworth Lodge, the building it occupied. The school was founded by the merger of two schools during the 1960s. Milton Mount College was founded in 1871 with Selina Hadland as head. It was originally sited in Milton-next-Gravesend near Gravesend Kent, and then relocated to Worth Park near Crawley. The second, Bournemouth Collegiate School, was established in 1899 in the town centre and moved to Wentworth Lodge in 1923. Due to falling pupil numbers, Wentworth became coeducational in 2008. It went into administration in July 2008, which prompted the UCST to propose the merger.

== Prep School ==
Bournemouth Collegiate Preparatory School

Location
- 40 St Osmund's Road; Poole, Dorset, BH14 9JY; England; 50.7201°N 1.9377°W

Information
- Type: Preparatory day school
- Department for Education URN: 113929 Tables
- Head of School: Karen Wyborn
- Gender: Coeducational
- Age: 3 to 11
- Website: http://www.bournemouthcollegiateschool.co.uk/prep-school/

The preparatory department is located at the former Uplands School site in Poole.

== Boarding ==
The boarding facilities are built around the old Wentworth Lodge, in which Wentworth College was housed and which were once part of the Portman Estate. The house, built in 1872, was used by Viscount Portman as a summer residence for around six weeks every year.
