= Insys =

Insys may refer to:

- INSYS, a British weapons manufacturer
- Insys Therapeutics, an American pharmaceutical company
