= Robert Harland (disambiguation) =

Robert Harland (1935–2023) was an American actor.

Robert Harland may also refer to:

- Sir Robert Harland, 1st Baronet (1715–1784), Royal Navy officer
- Sir Robert Harland, 2nd Baronet (1765–1848), of the Harland baronets
- Bob Harland (footballer) (1916–2006), Australian rules footballer

== See also ==
- Robert James Harlan (1816–1897), American civil rights activist and politician
- Bob Harlan (1936–2026), American football executive
