= List of universities in the Cook Islands =

This is a list of universities in Cook Islands.

== Universities ==
- Takamoa Theological College
- University of the South Pacific - Cook Islands campus
- Cook Islands Tertiary Training Institute

== See also ==
- List of universities by country
