= Aaron Buzacott =

British missionary (1800–1864)

The Reverend Aaron Buzacott
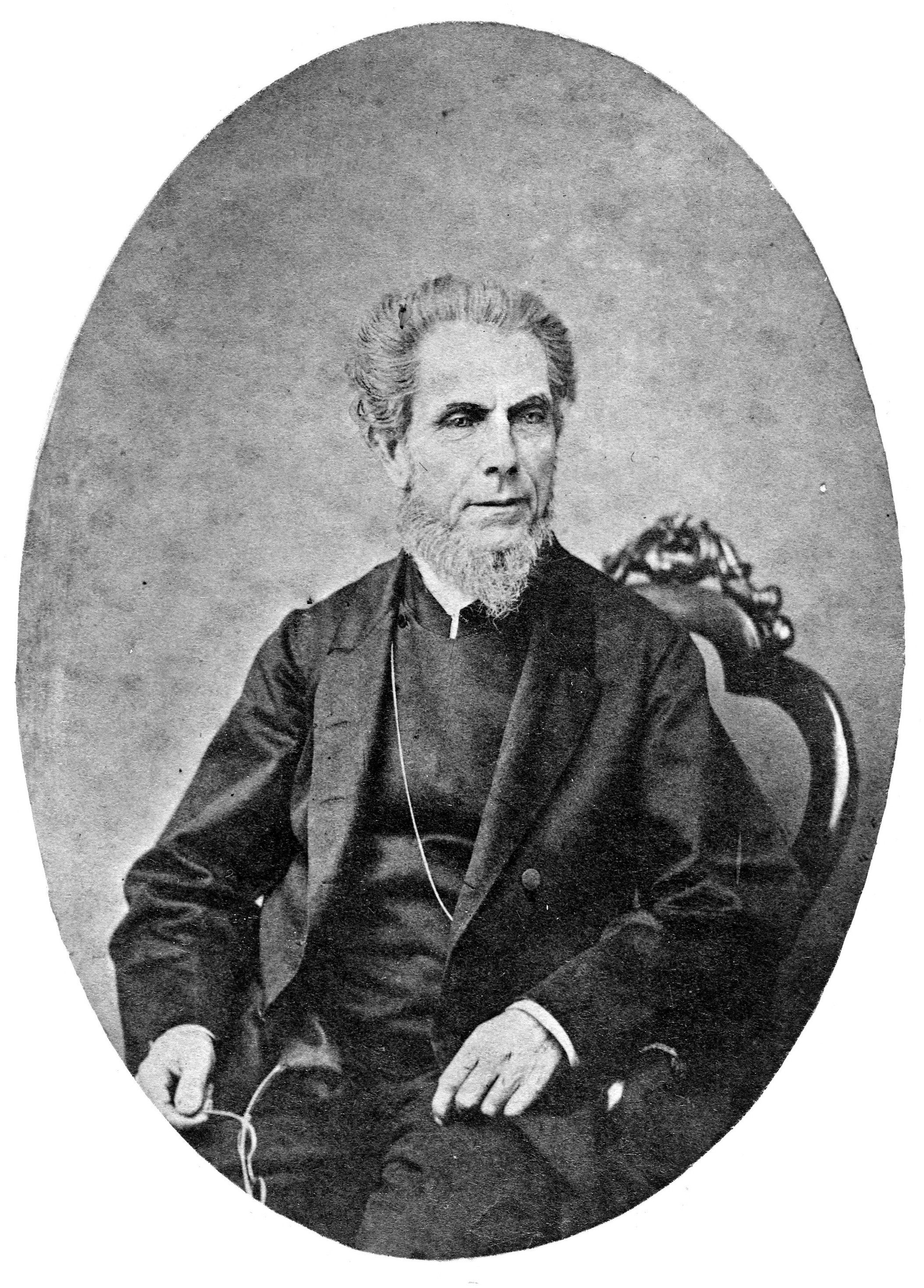
- The Rev. Aaron Buzacott the elder (c. 1860)
- Born: 4 March 1800; South Molton, Devon, England
- Died: 20 September 1864 (aged 64); Sydney, Colony of New South Wales
- Burial place: Devonshire Street Cemetery (original); Rookwood Cemetery (reinterred)
- Occupations: Minister; Missionary; Travelling agent
- Years active: 1828-1864
- Notable work: Te Bibilia Tapu ra, koia te Koreromotu taito e te Koreromotu ou; i kiritiia ei reo Rarotonga; Te akataka reo Rarotonga; or, Rarotongan and English grammar. Printed at the Mission Press. 17 September 2023.
- Spouse: Sarah Verney Hitchcock (m. 1827)
- Children: 3

Aaron Buzacott the elder (4 March 1800 – 20 September 1864) was a British missionary, Congregationalist colleague of John Williams (the 'Martyr of Erromanga'), author of ethnographic works and co-translator of the Bible into Cook Islands Māori. Buzacott was a central figure in the South Seas missionary work of the London Missionary Society, and lived on Rarotonga (one of the Cook Islands) from 1828 to 1857. During his time there, he assisted in the development of the written form of Cook Islands Māori, compiling a primer on English and Cook Islands Maori grammar. Buzacott, along with Williams and other missionary colleagues, contributed to the first translation of the Bible into that language, and translated additional theological texts including lectures from his education in London.

Buzacott was stationed at Avarua, the largest town on Rarotonga, where he designed and led the construction of two buildings which still exist today: the Coral Church or Ziona Tapu (Holy Zion), now used by the Cook Islands Christian Church; and the main building of Takamoa Theological College, an educational institution he founded in 1839 and served as both principal and educator until he retired from his station. He also assisted Williams in the construction of the mission schooner The Mission of Peace in 1828, to travel between the islands of the Pacific. Buzacott made journeys to various Pacific islands, including Tahiti and those comprising Samoa, during his posting, and visited both New South Wales and England to visit his children studying there, and in the case of England to run the completed Bible translation through the printing press.

Following several bouts of ill health, Buzacott retired to Sydney in 1857, and engaged in further work as a travelling agent for the London Missionary Society in the Australian colonies. He also became involved in both the Pitt Street and Bourke Street Congregational Churches, having become a resident of the Sydney suburb of Darlinghurst. A number of his contemporaries dubbed Buzacott "the model missionary" for his record of service on Rarotonga.

== Early life ==
Aaron Buzacott was born in South Molton, Devon where his father was a whitesmith and ironmonger and the family attended the local Congregational chapel. He was of Huguenot descent; Buzacott is an alternative spelling for Buzzacott, an anglicised form of de Boursaquotte. He received an early education at the village grammar school, and at the age of twelve was placed in the care of a gentleman farmer in the area for three years, to improve his constitution through outdoor manual labour. Greatly influenced by his mother, Buzacott recalled her prayers and religious instructions while working for the farmer, and became a devoted Christian. At the end of the three years, he was advised by friends to dedicate himself to his father's business, whitesmithing; the agricultural and metalworking skills learned in his youth would prove useful in his work on Rarotonga. Around this time, Buzacott began teaching Sunday school at the South Molton Congregational church, and eventually also joined the home district missionary in preaching at nearby villages on alternate Sundays.

In early 1816, the Rev. Richard Knill toured North Devon shortly before departing for Madras, and gave addresses outlining his reasons for becoming a missionary, at one of which Buzacott was present and became interested. In 1819 Knill visited a second time, cementing Buzacott's desires to engage in missionary work. An opportunity arose when The Rev. Joseph Hardy of Wheatly, Herefordshire, needed to visit London to obtain funds needed to pay off debt accrued in the construction of a chapel at Pembroke, and invited Buzacott to replace him during his absence. Hardy intimated this might lead to admission to a London college, and told Thomas Wilson about Buzacott. Wilson in turn arranged for Buzacott to spend a year preparing for college admission under the tuition of the Rev. D. Francis of Ludlow, Shropshire, from 1819-1820.

Buzacott entered Hoxton Academy in 1820 and devoted himself for three years to the study of general and classical literature and frequently attended the metropolitan Methodist chapels, the Tottenham Court Road Chapel and Moorfields Chapel (Whitefield's Tabernacle). During this time, he first engaged in missionary work, establishing a mission in Somers Town after hearing of the spiritual state of the mostly poor inhabitants, and seeking opportunities to preach. Expressing an interest in missionary work abroad following his attendance at a sermon by the Rev. James Parsons of York, his tutors commended him to the Board of the London Missionary Society, and after examination they accepted him for training at their Mission College under Dr David Bogue. Upon his death the students were transferred to Highbury College and the old Hoxton Academy near London. He completed his course in 1826, being ordained in January 1827 at Castle Street Congregational Church in Exeter. He married the following month, and later that year the couple set sail, via Tahiti, for Rarotonga in the South Seas, where they were to spend most of the rest of their lives.

== Missionary work in the South Seas ==
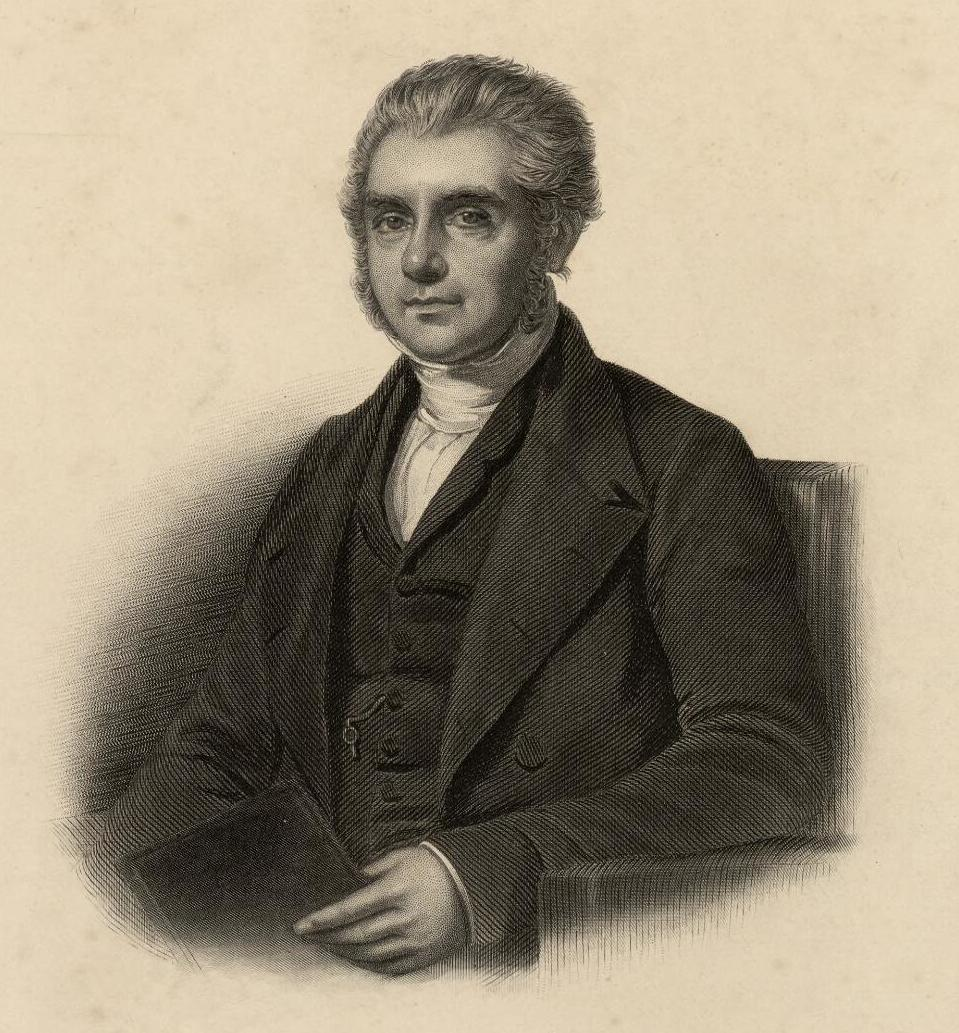
The Rev. Aaron Buzacott c. 1849.

Aaron Buzacott considered schools constitute one of the most important departments of missionary labour, and he paid special attention to the selection and education of native people. This purpose was advanced by his purchase of a piece of land on Avarua (Rarotonga) for 150 dollars, funded by the London Missionary Society; around which he paid for a stone wall built, and within which four cottages for Rarotongan families and single men, and a college building which still exists (Takamoa Theological College), were completed. Besides Mr Buzacott himself, the college was also staffed by Mrs Sarah Buzacott - who taught the married women students writing, arithmetic and needlework. The building architecture was designed to withstand the most violent hurricanes and was still in good condition when the Buzacott family left in 1857 owing to Aaron's ill health. Another notable building designed and built by Buzacott was the Coral Church, completed in 1853; it still stands to this day, and is used by the Cook Islands Christian Church.

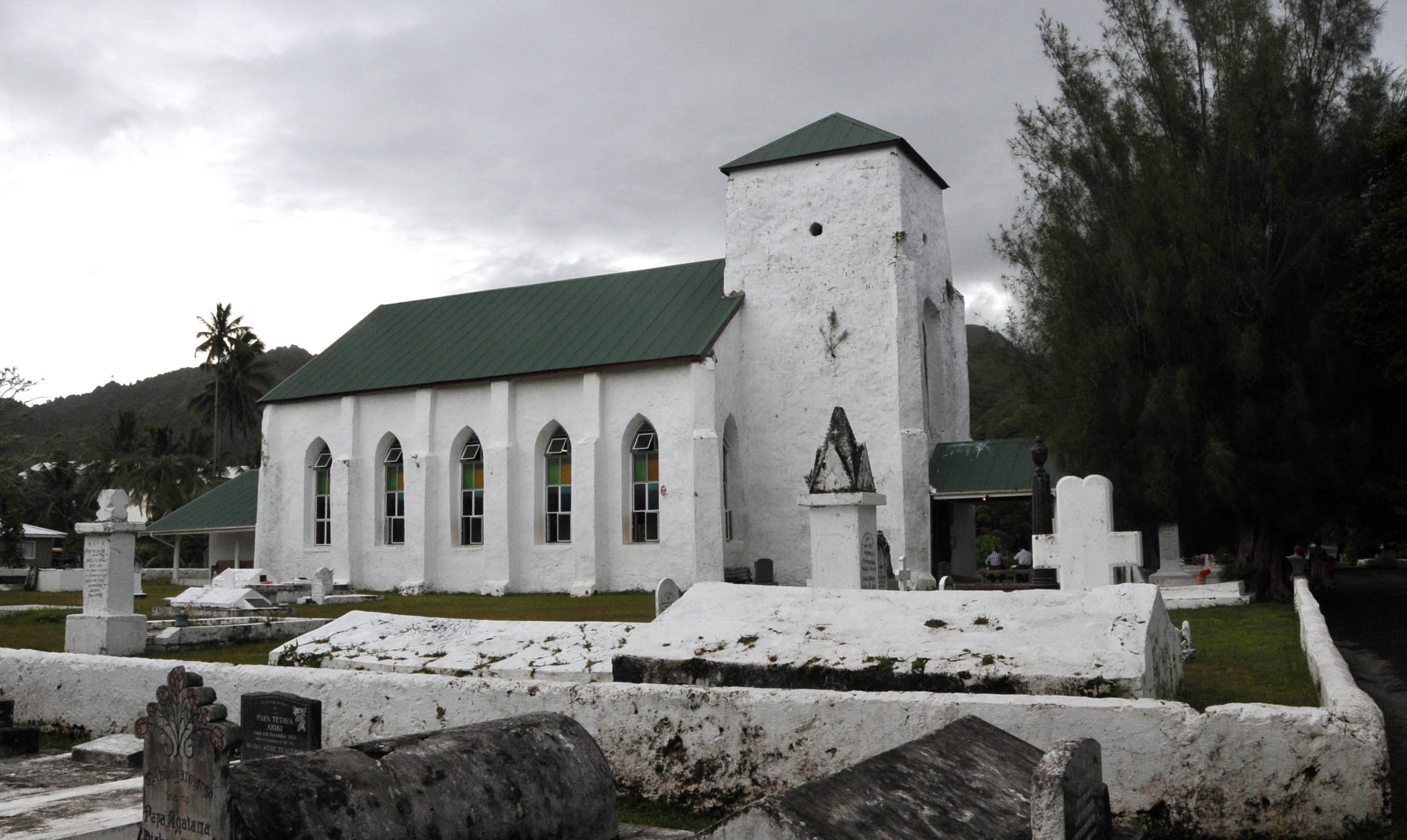
CICC church in Avarua, Raratonga, designed and built in 1853 by Buzacott.

The work of the college built on educational work to record Cook Islands Maori and print books in the native language. English only became the dominant language on the islands after the missionary period, and though it was taught at the college, the training of local pastors to encourage reading in the native language was seen as the key. This project of education in the native language, had begun in 1821 with the arrival of the missionary John Williams on Aitutaki. In 1823 his entourage, which included the native Tahitian from Borabora, Papehia, arrived on Rarotonga, soon to be joined by Charles Pitman in 1827 and, in 1828, by Buzacott. Initial translation of the Bible commenced in 1828 and was completed in 1851. Buzacott's Te Akataka Reo Rarotonga (published 1854-69) long remained the authoritative grammatical resource. By the early 1830s a printing press was in full operation under Buzacott's guidance, and by the mid-1850s most Rarotongans were able to read.

In 1831 Buzacott visited all the islands in the Hervey Group, with John Williams, and found them to suffer badly from hurricanes and cyclones during the winter. To help prevent famine he introduced the sweet potato, growing a crop in a piece of ground granted by the chief. Intense interest was aroused when he showed that the crop could be sold to a passing captain in exchange for coloured calicoes. The effect was magical records Mr Buzacott, Chiefs and people were eager for 'eyes' and 'tops' for planting. a suitable district was fixed upon and in a given week the whole population turned out. In the following year Mr Buzacott and John Williams traveled to Tahiti together.

Buzacott later visited Samoa (in 1834, and again in 1836) where he found American and English sailors who had run away from whaling ships, living on the islands with the permission of Samoan Chiefs but without schools. He wrote: It was pleasing to observe, by contrasting the present condition of Rarotonga with that of Samoa, the progress the gospel had already made among us.

Buzacott visited England 1847-51, being for that time a communicant under the pastoral care of the Rev. Henry Allon of Union Chapel, Islington, near London. He departed with 5000 copies of the newly translated Bible with his wife, daughter and the newly ordained Rev. William Wyatt Gill. On the return voyage to Rarotonga, he visited Van Diemen's Land to conduct services in Hobart Town to advocate for the mission cause. Buzacott presented a copy of the translated Bible to Lieutenant-Governor William Denison to be one of the first books in the newly established Tasmanian Public Library.

== Retirement, death & memorial ==
Buzacott retired for health reasons to New South Wales with his wife and daughter in 1857, and resided at Melbourne Cottage in Darlinghurst, a suburb of Sydney. Living in Sydney, with a climate cooler than that of Rarotonga, led to an improvement in his health and thus Buzacott engaged in further work on behalf of the London Missionary Society. He traveled to the major towns and cities across New South Wales, Queensland, Victoria, South Australia and Tasmania on behalf of the Society, to advocate for the mission cause and share stories of his life's work. Upon the departure of the Rev. Cuthbertson, then pastor of Pitt Street Congregational Church, from Sydney, Buzacott temporarily took his place as agent of the Society; the agent of the London Missionary Society was customarily also pastor of the church at Pitt Street. Buzacott also became involved with the Bourke Street Congregational Church and School, sitting on committees including one for building a new schoolroom in 1862, and becoming a deacon in 1863.

In early September 1864, Buzacott was at a committee meeting to consider the appointment of a new missionary at Rarotonga that lasted several hours and left him greatly weakened, with severe spasms continuing for several days until 10 September. He visited his friend, John Thompson, in Coogee. Buzacott returned after three hours spent wandering on the rocks with a severe cold, and soon experienced great pain again, eventually resulting in him returning to his home at Melbourne Cottage; he would never again leave his room, though many visitors associated with missionary work called on him during his illness. Buzacott died there on 20 September 1864, attended by his wife; his nephew, Walter Buzacott; and many friends. His funeral was held on 21 September, a Presbyterian minister reading from Scripture, and the procession then moving on to the Bourke Street Congregational Church where Rev Hartley, a Primitive Methodist, gave out the hymn. He was buried in the Congregational burying-ground in Devonshire Street, Sydney, now the location of the Central Railway Station; upon the clearing of the cemetery at Devonshire Street, his remains were reinterred at Rookwood Cemetery. Buzacott's name is also included on the grave of his wife and son at Abney Park Cemetery.

Much of Buzacott's contribution to published ethnographic knowledge of the Cook Islands, Samoa and Melanesia, and details of his life in England, Rarotonga and Australia, were set out in a volume that was published posthumously in 1866 back in London, edited by his son and James Povey Sunderland, and with a preface by the Rev. Henry Allon. The work was concluded by several letters to Mrs. Buzacott written just after the death of her husband and in high estimation of him, and a list of diseases prevalent in the islands of the South Seas.

Today the two-story Takamoa Mission House in the coastal town of Avarua, erected by Aaron Buzacott, is a government office; and the settlement of Arorangi, established by the Rev. Aaron Buzacott as a model village to resettle people near the coast under a native pastor, a tourist destination.

== Family ==
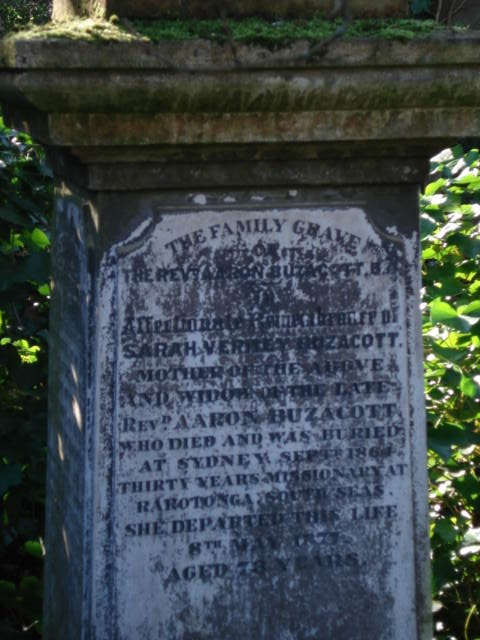
Memorial to Mrs Sarah Buzacott, Abney Park Cemetery, London.

Sarah Verney Hitchcock, Buzacott's wife, was also from South Molton, and became known for her educational work and writings in the South Seas mission. She kept her own written account of life in the coral islands of the Pacific, and returned to England after her husband's death. Her sisters also married missionaries; the third sister, Jane, married the Reverend Charles Hardie, who later joined the Buzacotts in the Pacific and were stationed in Samoa. Hardie would introduce Buzacott's future son-in-law, the Reverend Stephen Creagh, to his station in the Loyalty Islands in 1854. The fourth sister, Charlotte, married the Reverend James Sewell and accompanied him to engage in missionary work at Madras, where she became involved in promoting female education in the area. Her brother, Mr George Hitchcock, was a draper who founded Hitchcock & Rogers (later Hitchcock, Williams & Co.) and became a friend and neighbour of Samuel Morley's at St Paul's Churchyard. George Hitchcock became noted for his support of Congregationalism and his support for the nascent YMCA (Young Men's Christian Association); he was the employer, and later business partner and father-in-law of YMCA founder Sir George Williams, and thus the great-great-great-grandfather of future Mayor of London and British Prime Minister, Boris Johnson.

The Buzacott's son, Rev. Aaron Buzacott the younger (1828–1881), was born in Tahiti while the family awaited transport to Rarotonga. After spending his early years with his parents on Rarotonga, the younger Buzacott was sent to Sydney, where he attended Sydney College. Styling himself Rev Aaron Buzacott BA to distinguish his work from that of his father, he later went to England and eventually became Secretary of the Anti-Slavery Society (now Anti-Slavery International) from 1875-1878; and pastor (c.1870) of the Asylum Road Congregational Chapel, later known as the Clifton Congregational Chapel, Peckham; he is buried with his mother at Abney Park Cemetery.

Their daughter, Sarah Anne Buzacott (1829-1915), was born in Avarua and assisted her father in the revision of proofs for the Rarotongan Bible; this assistance was appreciated by the British and Foreign Bible Society, which rewarded her with £10 and a copy of both the Rarotongan and English Bibles (with a choice of any size and kind of the English version). She was made a life governor of the Society in 1900. She resided with her parents on Rarotonga and was sent to be educated in England; she returned with them to the island following their visit from 1847-1851, and joined them in Sydney when Buzacott retired. She married the Reverend Stephen Creagh, also of the London Missionary Society, in Sydney in 1858. She then joined him in the Loyalty Islands, where he was missionary from 1854-1886. They retired to the Sydney suburb of Strathfield, and are buried next to Buzacott in the same plot at Rookwood Cemetery. The Creaghs had four daughters and three sons; one daughter married the Reverend George Lesingham Rayner, and later accompanied him to Glenelg, South Australia. One of their sons was South Australian Rhodes Scholar and medical doctor Howard Rayner. Two of their sons, Robert Luscombe and Ronald Buzacott Creagh, became farmers in Nungarin, Western Australia; Ronald's daughter Gladys married Arthur Norman Birks, a member of the prominent Birks family.

A third child, daughter Maria Jane Buzacott, was born in Avarua in 1831. She died of croup aged two years and nine months, and was buried on Rarotonga; she was given the Rarotongan name "Takau a Makea" by Makea Pori Ariki.

Other notable relatives include his nephews, Walter Sewell Buzacot and Charles Hardie Buzacott (1835-1918) Walter was the proprietor of Buzacott & Co., a ships chandlery, ironmongery, engineering and metal fence and gate manufacturing business founded in 1849, which he took over in 1877; his father-in law was one of the co-founders. Charles was involved in establishing and operating several newspapers in Queensland, served as the postmaster-general of the colony, and served as the Member for Rockhampton in the Legislative Assembly (1873-1877) and Member of the Legislative Council twice (1879-1882; 1894-1901), the second time spanning the transition of Queensland from self-governed colony to state of the Commonwealth of Australia.
