= Devonshire Street Cemetery =

Cemetery in Sydney, Australia

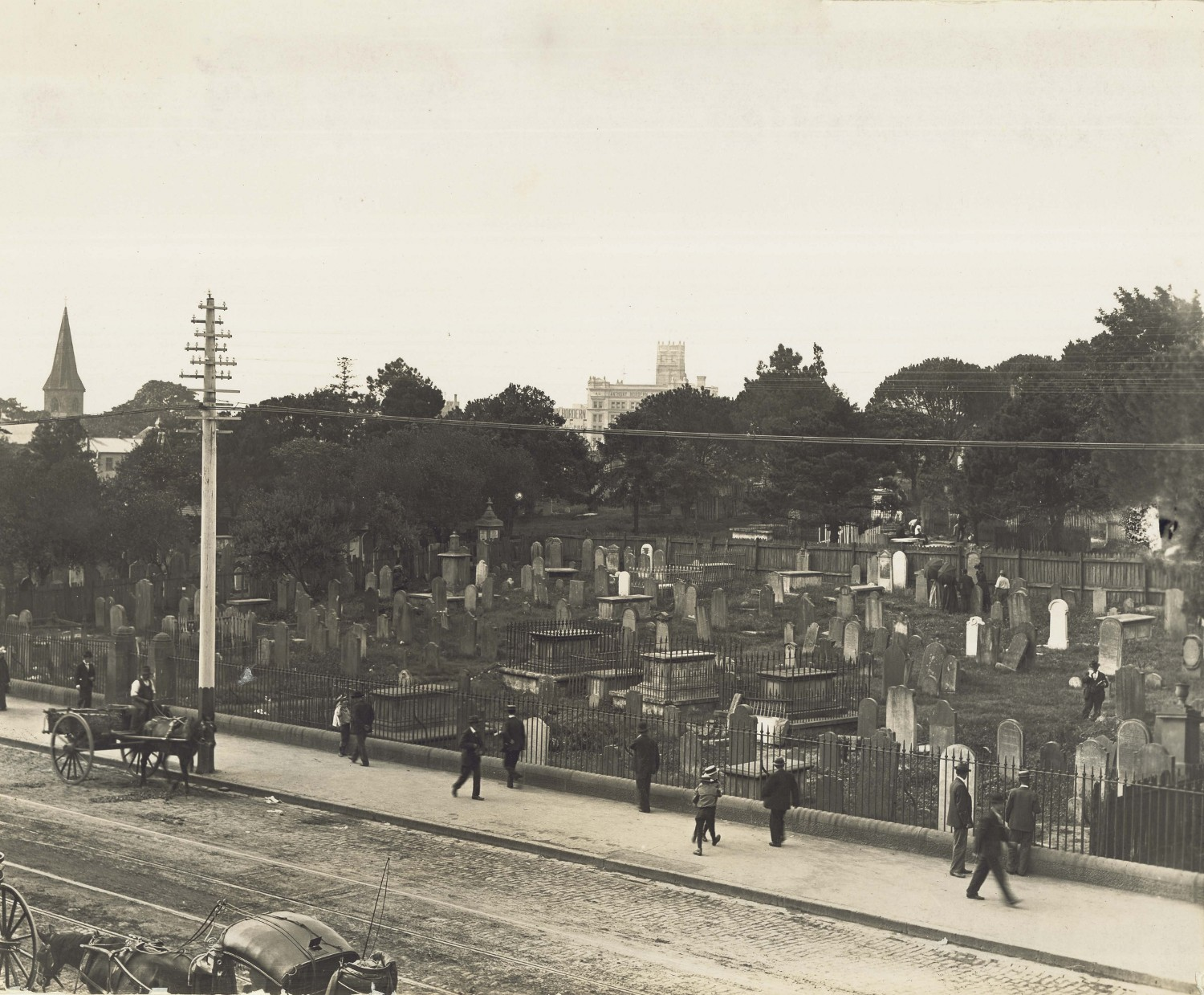
- Interactive map of Devonshire Street Cemetery

Details
- Established: 1820
- Closed: 1901
- Location: New South Wales, Brickfield Hill, Sydney
- Country: Australia
- Coordinates: 33°53′03″S 151°12′25″E
- Type: Public
- Size: 11 acres (4.5 hectares)
- No. of interments: 21,000
- Footnotes: Last interment 1867; Closed and re-used 1901

The Devonshire Street Cemetery (also known as the Brickfield Cemetery or Sandhills Cemetery) was located between Eddy Avenue and Elizabeth Street, and between Chalmers and Devonshire streets, at Brickfield Hill, in Sydney, Australia. It was consecrated in 1820. The Jewish section was used from 1832. By 1860, the cemetery was full, and it was closed in 1867.

== History ==
In 1820, Governor Macquarie ordered the consecration of the Devonshire Street Cemetery. The burial ground was set aside on Brickfield Hill. These cemeteries were the principal burial grounds from 1820 to 1866 in Sydney and they were often called the Sandhills Cemetery, a colloquial name found on some death certificates which reflects the land at the edge of Surry Hills.

A brick wall was erected before any interments took place to enclose its 4 acres (1.6 hectares). Within a four-year period the cemetery was expanded by the addition of 7 acres (2.8 hectares) to its south. A road was formed along the southern boundary of the cemetery in the first half of the 1830s and was called Devonshire Street. The Devonshire Street Cemetery, where many of the early settlers were buried, was later moved to build the Sydney railway terminus.

In 1901, the cemetery was resumed to allow for the development of Central railway station, Sydney and representatives of deceased persons buried in the Devonshire Street cemetery were given two months to arrange for exhumation and removal of remains from the cemetery. All reasonable costs were borne by the Government of New South Wales. The remains that were unclaimed were relocated to a purpose-built cemetery named Bunnerong Cemetery. Remains that were claimed were transferred to a number of cemeteries as listed below. Bunnerong Cemetery, south of the city, had a tram line constructed to make the removal of recasketed remains as simple as possible. Bunnerong Cemetery was next to the Botany Cemetery and, in the early 1970s, was absorbed by that cemetery to create the Eastern Suburbs Memorial Park. Central railway station was opened on 4 August 1906.

== Re-interment cemeteries ==
Cemetery locations in the metropolitan region that took re-interments from Devonshire Street Cemetery include Gore Hill Cemetery, St Thomas Cemetery in Crows Nest, Rookwood Cemetery, Waverley Cemetery, Balmain Cemetery, Camperdown General Cemetery, Randwick General Cemetery, Bunnerong Cemetery, Field of Mars Cemetery, South Head Cemetery and Woronora Memorial Park. Remains were also relocated outside the metropolitan area, including Sandgate Cemetery in Newcastle, New South Wales and Berkeley Pioneer Cemetery in Unanderra.

An index created from a number of previous collections of information, including some remaining original cemetery registers, called the Devonshire Street Cemetery re-interment register and index ("microform" format) was produced by the Library of Australian History, North Sydney, 1999. A copy is held by the State Library of New South Wales. A hardback book version was also produced.

== Notable people buried in Devonshire Street Cemeteries ==
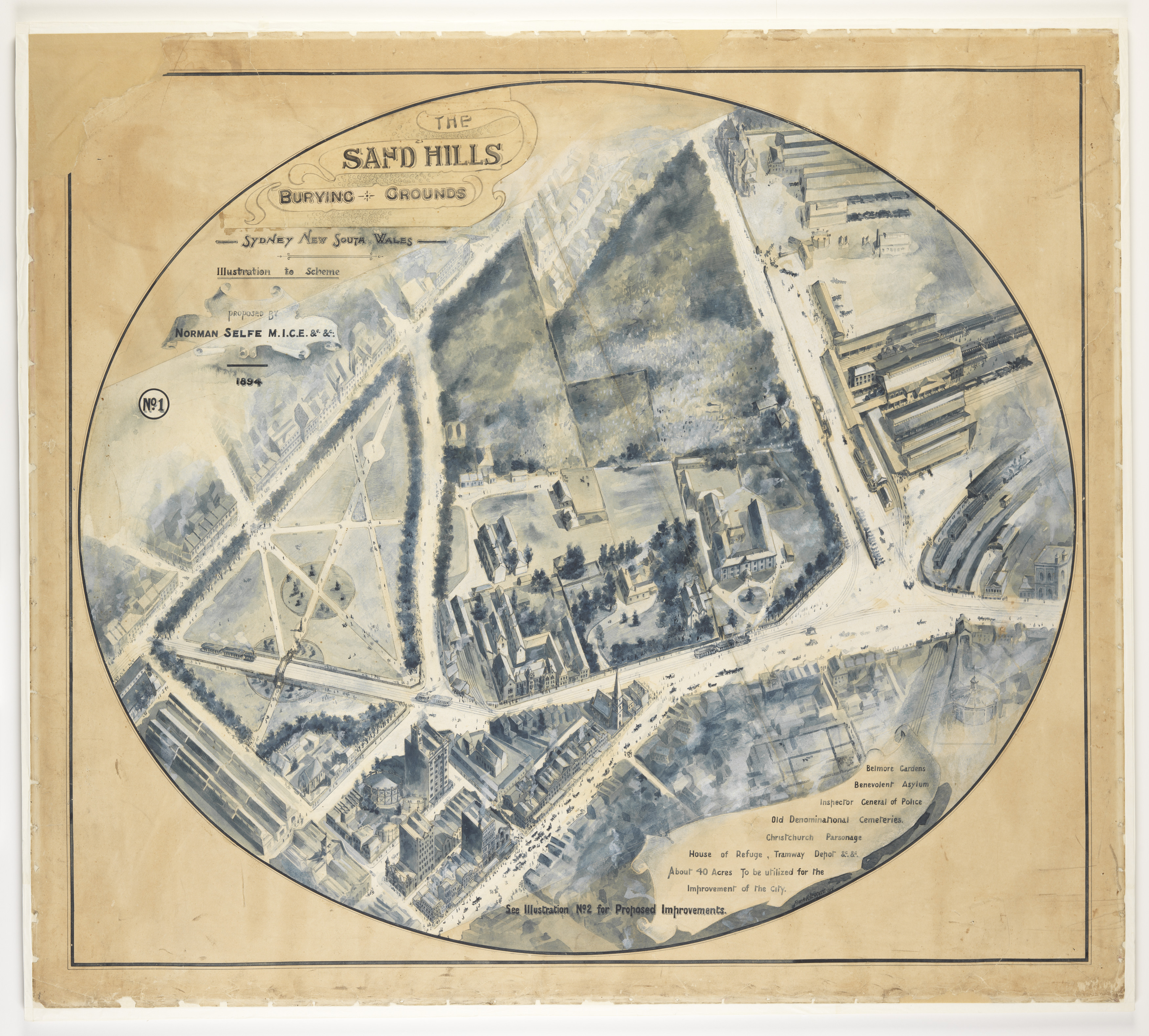
Drawing of the Cemetery and surrounding area by Norman Selfe in 1894

- Aaron Buzacott (1800–1864), Congregational minister, missionary at Rarotonga and founder of Takamoa Theological College; reinterred at Rookwood Cemetery
- Robert Cooper, business man
- William Cowper, Anglican archdeacon
- Allan Cunningham, English botanist and explorer
- John Dunn, bushranger
- Michael Dwyer, Irish convict and leader of the Irish Rebellion of 1798
- Cora Gooseberry, Murro-ore-dial woman and cultural knowledge keeper
- John Gurner, chief clerk of the NSW Supreme Court for many years, solicitor, landowner
- George Howe, printer of The Sydney Gazette and the New South Wales Advertiser
- James Hume, architect
- Barnett Levey, merchant and theatre director
- Isaac Nichols, convict, farmer, ship owner, public servant and Australia's first postmaster
- John Joseph William Molesworth Oxley, Surveyor-General and Explorer (c. 1784–1828)
- Mary Reibey, merchant, ship owner and trader
- David Stuurman, South African Khoi Chief and political activist (c. 1773–1830)
- Joseph Thompson (1779–1858) was an English–born draper who was an elder of the Pitt Street Congregational Church. His remains were discovered by archaeologists during construction works for the Sydney Metro in 2019.
- Lancelot Threlkeld, missionary
- Robert Wardell, barrister and co-founder of The Australian newspaper
- Celia Wills, daughter of Mary Reibey
