= Harlon =

Harlon is a masculine given name. Notable people with this name include:

- Harlon Barnett (born 1967), American football coach and former player
- Harlon Block (1924–1945), United States Marine Corps corporal killed in action in the Battle of Iwo Jima in World War II
- Harlon Carter (1913–1991), American advocate for gun rights, leader of the National Rifle Association of America
- Harlon L. Dalton, professor of law at Yale Law School, ordained minister in the Episcopal church
- Harlon Hill (1932–2013), American football player
- Harlon Klaasen (born 1993), South African rugby union player

== See also ==
- Harlon Hill Trophy, award in American college football
- Harlan, given name and surname
- Haron, given name and surname
- Harlin, rural town and locality in the Somerset Region, Queensland, Australia
- Halon, group of chemical compounds
