= Joyce Reason =

English author (1894–1974)

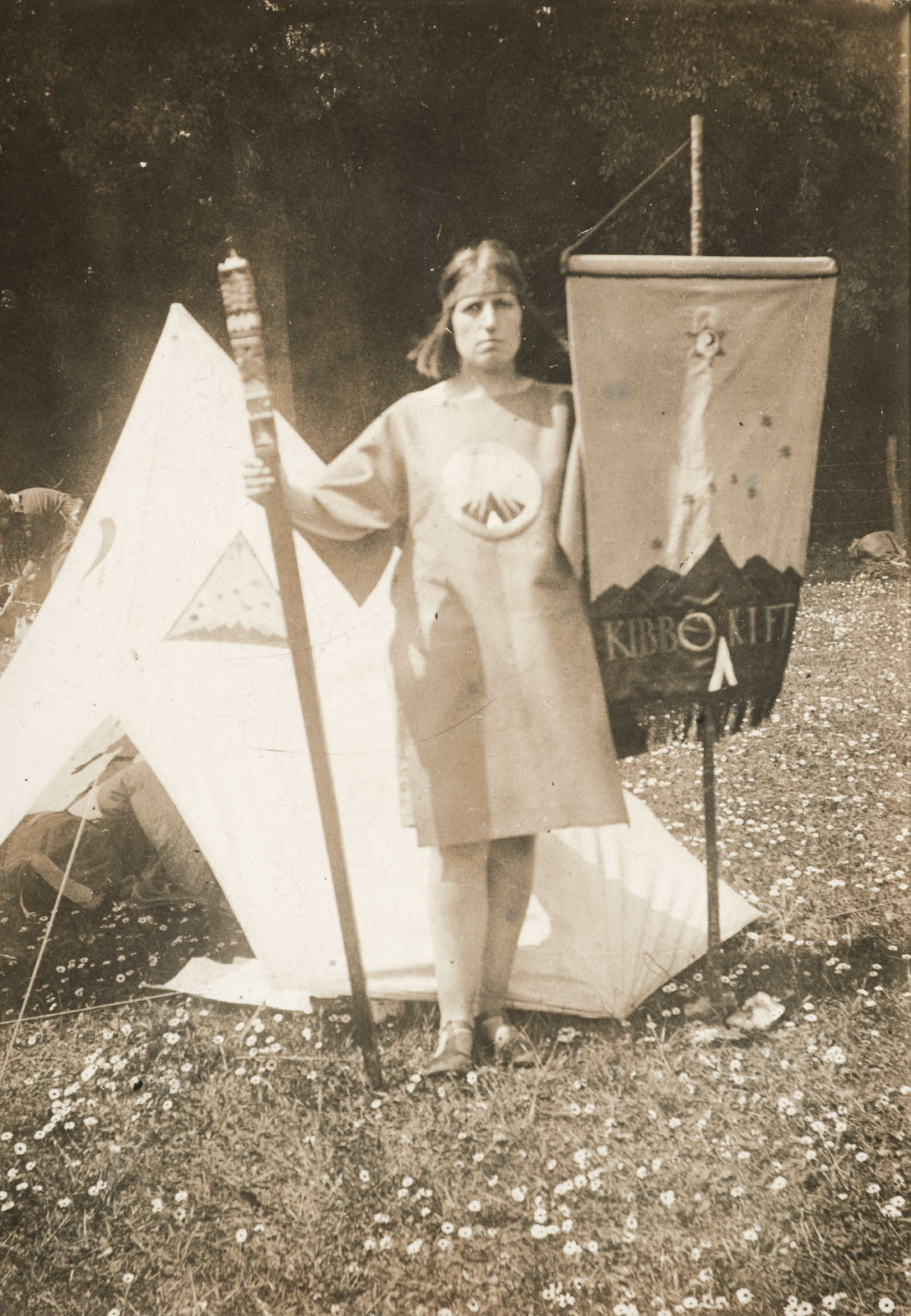
- Born: Joyce Reason; September 1894; London, England
- Died: 19 September 1974 (aged 81); London, England
- Education: Milton Mount College
- Occupation: Writer
- Writing career
- Genres: Junior historical fiction, Missionary biography
- Notable works: Bran the Bronze Smith, The Mad Miller of Wareham, The Secret Fortress, To Capture the King

Joyce Reason (December 1894 – 18 September 1974) was a British author of missionary biographies and historical fiction for young readers.

== Life and works ==
Joyce Reason was born in Canning Town, London. Her father, Will Reason, was a Congregational minister who campaigned and wrote around themes of social justice and poverty (books such as Poverty, Drink and the Community, Homes and Housing, Christianity and Social Renewal). Both her parents were university graduates.

Reason contracted rickets as a child, which left her with a slight limp. In 1900, the Reason family was living in the North London suburb of Friern Barnet. She was educated at Milton Mount College in Gravesend, Kent, an educational institution for the daughters of Congregational ministers, although other pupils could attend.

In a memoir of his great-aunt, Matthew Reason writes: "In following traces of her life, through both public archives and private collections in attics and cupboards, I discovered that as well as a writer she was an idealist, an evangelist, a bluestocking, a spinster, a crank, and a missionary."

She was a keen hiker and her article 'A Lone Woman's Hike from Glastonbury to Winchester' appeared in the first issue of the Hiker and Camper (February 1931). She was considered an authority on the Kibbo Kift movement. Under the woodcraft name of Sea Otter, she was accorded at various times the titles of Skald (storyteller), Folklorist and Nomad Chief of the North. She left the movement in the 1930s due to its politicisation to begin a new career as a writer.

Reason was a prolific author of popular missionary biographies and accounts of the work of the London Missionary Society. She wrote missionary biographies of Mary Aldersey of China, James Chalmers of Papua, Albert Cook of Uganda, William Kendall Gale of Madagascar, Wilfred Grenfell of Labrador, James Hannington of Uganda, Griffith John of China, David Jones of Madagascar, Liang Fa of China, Henry Nott of the South Seas, Ruatoka of Papua, Bishop Selwyn of New Zealand, Howard Somervell of India, and others. She also wrote popular biographies of John Bunyan, Robert Browne, Henry Barrowe, William Penn, Isobel Kuhn and Sadhu Sundar Singh of India.

In September 1951, Joyce Reason joined the headquarters staff of the Leprosy Mission as Editorial Secretary for a five-year term. She visited Uganda and Tanganyika to write an account of the Mission's work in East Africa, and also visited the Church of Scotland's leprosy settlement at Chogoria in Kenya.

Joyce Reason was a noted advocate of Christian books and in 1950 was a featured speaker at the Christianity in Books Exhibition at Memorial Hall, Farringdon Street, together with the Dean of St Paul's Cathedral. She believed there was empirical evidence for the existence of the human soul. In response to a letter by a Professor Crew about life-termination by the individual, she suggested that the professor had not investigated evidence from ESP and psychology for regarding our lives as a part of something "much larger and more enduring".

Reason was noted as an author of historical fiction for young people. Reviewers praised her books for their well-researched historical backgrounds, strong stories and colourful personalities. Her novel The Mad Miller of Wareham is set in King John's time in Dorset and concerns a plot to put Arthur of Brittany on the throne. The towns, villages, abbeys and priories of Dorset, where the tale is set, are creditably brought to light and more than one of the characters is drawn in the round and exists as a person. The novel To Capture the King, concerns a Jacobite plot and smuggling on the Sussex coast, with incidental glimpses of Samuel Johnson and Horace Walpole.The texture of history is less closely woven in this but the story is exciting.

Bran the Bronze-Smith: A Tale of the Bronze Age in the British Isles is a story a boy in prehistoric Britain who becomes a travelling smith and eventually a master smith. Swords of Iron is set in Pre-Roman Britain. The Secret Fortress deals in traditional style with the last age of Viking rule in Cumberland. The Queen's Champions is a story of a plot against Queen Elizabeth I and how a young boy plays an important part in averting disaster. Red Pennons Flying is a tale set during the Hundred Years' War.

She also wrote Dwifa's Curse: A Tale of the Stone Age under the nom-de-plume "Blue Wolf". It is set in Stone Age Britain, just at the time the earlier Neolithic people are coming into contact with later Stone Age people armed with the bow and more advanced in civilisation.

She produced a number of works for the Sunday School "rewards" market which are still occasionally reprinted. The copyrights of these and many of her other works are now held by Lutterworth Press.

For the last 20 years of her life at least, Joyce Reason, a Congregationalist by denomination, lived at 102 Addison Rd, Guildford. She was not married and for much of her life lived with her younger sister, the chemist and teacher Hazel Alden Reason, who was also unmarried.

A number of her books have been translated into French, German and Swedish.

== Selected juvenile fiction ==
- Bran the Bronze-Smith. Illustrated by the author. (1930, repr.1939,1961)
- Prentices and Clubs! A Tudor Tale. (1947)
- The Secret Fortress. (1949)
- Swords of Iron. (1956)
- The Mad Miller of Wareham. Illustrated by S. Van Abbé. (1949, repr. 1954)
- The Queen's Champions. Illustrated by Trevor Stubley. (1966)
- To Capture the King: The Story of a Jacobite Plot. (1956)
- Three Secret Seeds

== Selected factual books ==
- A Fellowship of Churches, 1662-1962: A Short History of the witness of the Guildford and District Congregational Churches (1962)
- Looking at India
- Deep-sea doctor
- The trail of Lady Lisle in 1685
- Storm over Madagascar
