= Bill Marsters =

William Fatianga Marsters (26 November 1923 – 26 August 2004) was the first president of the Cook Islands Christian Church (CICC), the largest religious denomination in the Cook Islands.

Marsters was born on Palmerston Island. He is one of the 134 grandchildren of William Marsters, the English explorer who settled on the then-uninhabited Palmerston in 1863 with his three Polynesian wives. Bill Marsters was often referred to as "Reverend Bill" in order to distinguish him from the many other Marsters family members named after William Marsters.

Bill Marsters became the president of the CICC in 1968, when it was granted autonomy by an Act of the Parliament of the Cook Islands. He was a popular figure throughout the Cook Islands and administered the church from Rarotonga. Marsters was forced to resign from the church presidency in the late 1970s when he became involved in a scandal involving missing church funds. After his resignation, he returned to live in Palmerston Island, where he acted as the CICC pastor and the de facto head of the small island community of Marsters descendants.

Marsters' actions as head of the CICC and his subsequent behaviour on Palmerston Island were the subject of severe criticism in a 1994 book in which an American journalist visited Palmerston Island and reported on conversations he had had with many of the residents of the island.

Marsters and his wife were the parents of 12 children. Marsters died in 2004 in Auckland, New Zealand.
