= Milton Mount College =

Girls' boarding school in England, 1871–1960s

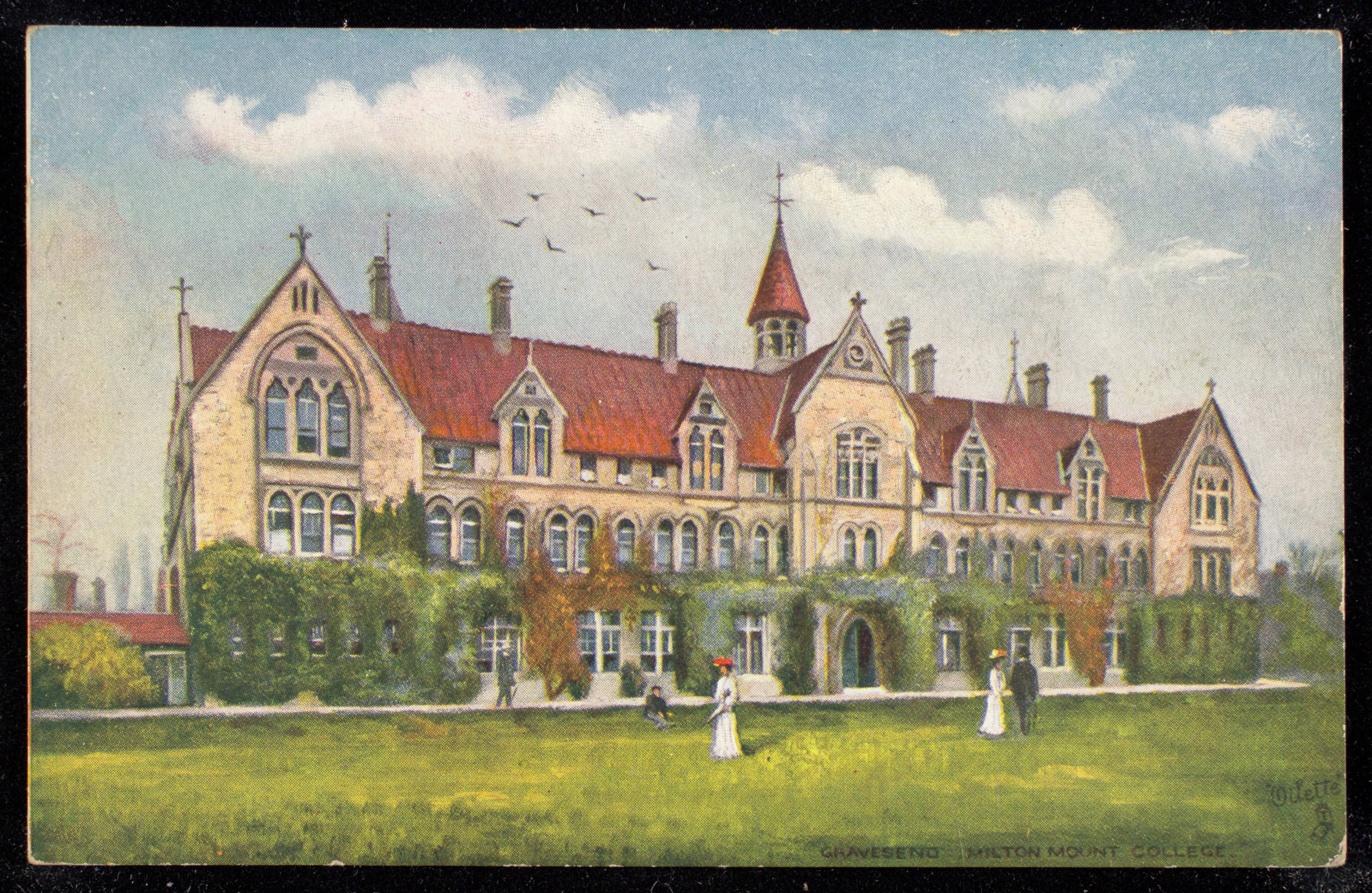
- View of the original school building on a postcard, 1903

Location
- 1: Gravesend, Kent; 2: Cirencester, Gloucestershire; 3: Crawley, West Sussex; United Kingdom
- Coordinates: 51.431950°N 0.373682°E

Information
- Other name: Milton Mount College for Girls; Wentworth College
- Type: Girls' boarding school
- Religious affiliation: Congregational Church
- Established: 1871
- Founder: Rev. William Guest
- Closed: 1960s
- Head teacher: Selina Hadland (1871–1889); Ethel Mary Conder (1889–)
- Gender: Girls
- Language: English
- Affiliation: Congregational Church
- Website: www.miltonmount.org.uk

Milton Mount College was a girls' boarding school that was established in Milton-next-Gravesend near Gravesend, Kent, southeast England. It was founded in 1871, opened to pupils in 1873, and the original building was demolished in 1972.

== Establishment of the school ==
Milton Mount College was founded by the Rev. William Guest, Minister of the Princes Street Congregational Church as a religious school for the daughters of Congregational ministers, although other pupils were also accepted. It was located on the southern side of Windmill Hill at the junction of Parrock Road and Echo Square. The architect of the school building was E. C. Robins from Southampton and it was built in the Victorian Gothic style in an "E" shape. The foundation stone was laid in 1871 and the school opened in 1873.

The first headmistress of the school was Miss Selina Hadland (1838–1919), a pioneer of girls' education. Milton Mount College is believed to be the first school in the UK to include domestic science in its curriculum.

== Later years ==
Hadland retired from her post in 1889 and Ethel Mary Conder succeeded her. The school remained in its initial location until World War I when, after air raids started locally on 4 June 1915, it closed on 24 June 1915 and moved to Cirencester in Gloucestershire for the following term and then Worth Park near Crawley in West Sussex, where it continued until after World War II. Tilgate House and Worth Park, used by Milton Mount College, were demolished in the 1950s. The school merged with Bournemouth Collegiate School to become Wentworth College in the 1960s.

== Gravesend building later history ==
When the school vacated its original building, it was initially used as a hostel for munitions workers at Vickers and later for a period as a hospital for invalided soldiers. It was used for cases of venerial disease, after being requisitioned by the Admiralty in March 1918, so the school declined to return to the location.

In 1921, the building was sold for use as an orphan school, run by the Roman Catholic church. In 1926, it was officially opened by the Roman Catholic Bishop of Southwark, continuing as part of the Southwark Rescue Society. In 1940 during World War II, the school was evacuated to Ugbrooke Park, Chudleigh, Devon, the residence of Lord and Lady Clifford. During World War II, the building was used as a canteen by the Auxiliary Fire Service (later the National Fire Service) and the Women's Voluntary Service. The school returned to Milton Mount in September 1945 at the end of World War II. It was closed in 1951, after which a number of new St Mary's Children's homes and buildings were erected on Parrock Road and Glen View. After remaining empty for a period, in 1972 the original building was demolished and the site was then developed for housing.

== Alumnae ==
- Maud Chadburn CBE (1868–1957), surgeon
- Catherine Alderton MBE JP CC (née Robinson; 1869–1951), Liberal Party politician. suffragist, teacher, and elected as Mayoress
- Eveline Lowe (née Farren; 1869–1956), politician
- Gertrude Powicke (1887–1919), teacher, relief worker, and suffragist
- Joyce Reason (1894–1974), author of missionary biographies and historical fiction for young readers
- Hazel Alden Reason (1901–1976), chemist, teacher, and author
- Mary Wilson, Lady Wilson of Rievaulx (née Baldwin; 1916–2018), poet and wife of the former British Prime Minister Harold Wilson
- Mary Margaret Francis (1924–2000), author, entrepreneur, and wife of the crime writer Dick Francis

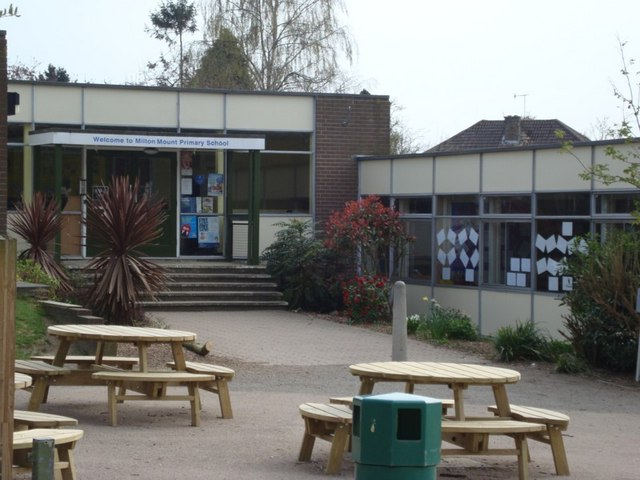
Milton Mount Primary School

== Milton Mount Primary School ==
The similarly named Milton Mount Primary School in Crawley was established in 1972.

== Archives ==
Information on the school is available in the archives of the West Sussex Record Office.
