= Harlond =

Harlond may refer to:

- Harlond, a fictional place in J. R. R. Tolkien's Gondor
- Harlond Clift (1912–1992), Americal baseball player

== See also ==
- Harland (disambiguation)
