= Uplands School, Poole =

Coordinates: 50.719°N 1.937°W

Uplands School
- Poole, Dorset; England

Information
- Type: Private School
- Established: 1895
- Headmistress: Sheila M Mercer
- Gender: Co-educational
- Age: 2 to 16
- Enrolment: 300 (approx.)
- Houses: 4
- Colour: Blue
- Website: https://web.archive.org/web/20070517040256/http://www.uplands.poole.sch.uk/

Uplands School was a co-educational independent school based in the coastal town of Poole, Dorset on the south coast of England. It consisted of a junior school (ages 2–11) and a senior school (ages 11–16). In 2009, the school merged with Wentworth College.

The merger of the two schools formed Bournemouth Collegiate School whose principal is Maria Coulter. The junior school is situated at the old Uplands site and the senior school at Wentworth. This new school falls under the umbrella of CATS Global Schools, after it was purchased from United Learning Trust in 2018 it is now privately owned.

== History ==
The School on the site in St Osmunds Road began as the Bourne School for Girls in the old Sandecotes Manor as a select girls boarding school. They built School House, which was completed in 1895 and this building today houses the junior hall and the classrooms above it. In 1900, Lord Wimborne bought Bourne School and it became Sandecotes School, and in 1903 a sister school was opened in St Leonards-on-Sea in Sussex which was called Uplands. At both schools pupils were trained to be practical, refined and cultured and were encouraged to enter universities, medical schools and hospitals. The Schools continued through the First World War, raising funds for the Red Cross and entertaining wounded soldiers, but at the break of World War II it was decided to take Uplands away from the danger threatening England's channel ports by moving to Monmouthshire. Meanwhile, in Parkstone, the Sandecotes School was struggling and the Church Education Corporation decided to close it rather than evacuate it to another area. During the war the School was occupied by the 2nd Battalion the Grenadier Guards and also by American soldiers as they prepared for the D-Day landings. In 1946 it was decided to move Uplands from Monmouthshire to the vacated Sandecotes buildings. The School continued as a girls boarding and day school, but in 1973 the old buildings were proving too costly and the School faced closure until Edith Cooper Dean stepped in to support it. The top site was sold off and new school buildings were built. The School became co-educational and also started a junior School, laying the foundation for joining UCST and merging with Wentworth College in 2009.
