= Ruatoka =

New Guinea missionary (1846–1903)

Ruatoka (1846? – 12 September 1903) was a Protestant Christian missionary in British New Guinea (now Papua New Guinea). The son of Christian converts, he was born in Tamarua, Mangaia Island, Cook Islands. In about 1868 he attended Takamoa Theological College, Rarotonga, then under James Chalmers. He was one of six Polynesians chosen to convert New Guinea, and with his wife, Tungane, landed at Manumanu on the coast of Papua in November 1872.

In February 1873 they left due to fever. Five months later Ruatoka and three colleagues sailed for Port Moresby, where he remained until his death.

Ruatoka and his wife taught the locals of Papua New Guinea, Cook Islands dancing and songs; more than 100 years later "Aito Pakapaka" was sung by Moses Tau and Te Marama which is sung by the People of Ruatoka.

As well as being a successful evangelist, he served as a guide, interpreter and advisor to the English missionaries. He was also noted for his work as a mediator in land disputes. His name is commemorated by Ruatoka Road, Port Moresby, and Ruatoka College, Rigo, Papua. His portrait appears on a 1972 Papua New Guinea postage stamp.

== Biography ==
- Joyce Reason, Take My Life: Ruatoka of Papua. London: Edinburgh House Press, 1947
