= Scott Hadland =

American physician and scientist

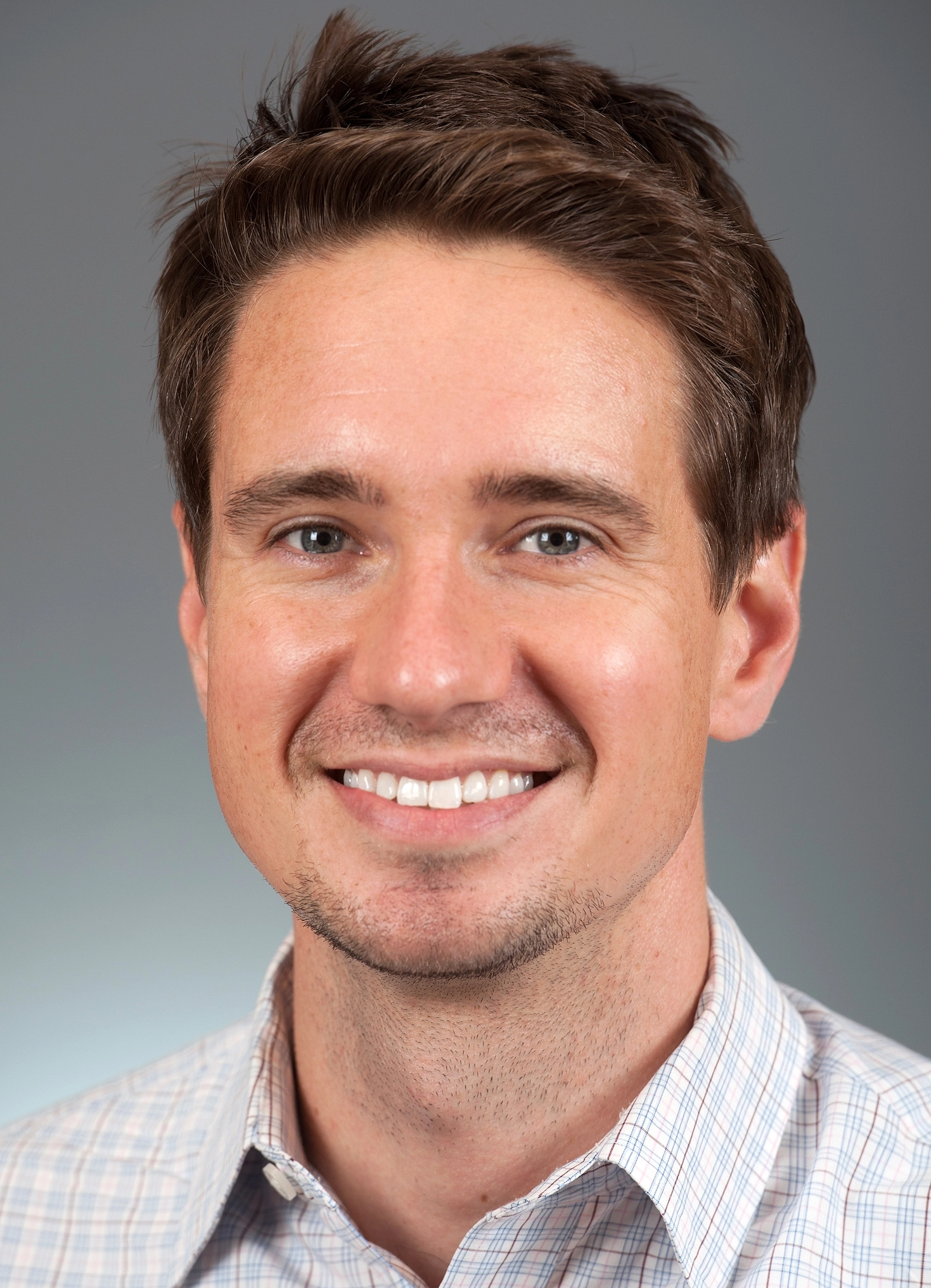
- Born: November 19, 1981 (age 44)
- Education: Harvard University; Washington University in St. Louis; Johns Hopkins University; McGill University
- Scientific career
- Fields: pediatrics, adolescent medicine, addiction medicine, opioids, pharmaceutical marketing
- Workplaces: Boston Children's Hospital; Boston Medical Center; Harvard University
- Website: Boston University profile

Scott E. Hadland (born November 19, 1981) is a Canadian-American physician and scientist who serves as a pediatrician, and addiction specialist at Massachusetts General Hospital and Harvard Medical School, where he is the Chief of the Division of Adolescent and Young Adult Medicine. He previously served as an addiction specialist at the Grayken Center for Addiction at Boston Medical Center.

A key finding of Hadland's research has been to confirm that an increase in dollars spent on marketing from the pharmaceutical industry to American doctors was linked to mortality from opioid overdoses one year later.

== Research ==
A series of studies led by Hadland provide evidence linking the marketing of opioids directly to doctors, and the addiction epidemic in the United States. Counties where opioid manufacturers offered gifts and payments to doctors were found to have more overdose deaths involving prescription painkillers than counties where direct-to-physician marketing was less aggressive. The pharmaceutical industry spent $39.7 million promoting opioid medications to nearly 68,000 doctors from 2013 through 2015, including meals, trips and consulting fees. For every three additional payments to doctors per 100,000 people in a county, overdose deaths involving prescription opioids in that area, a year later, were 18 percent higher.

In another study, Hadland showed that doctors participating in the national Medicare program who received drug company marketing of opioids prescribed on average 9% more opioids the next year compared to those who did not receive marketing. In this study, which examined marketing in 2014, Insys Therapeutics was responsible for half of all marketing dollars to doctors. The marketing practices of Insys were the subject of federal investigation in which Hadland's study was cited, and its chief executive officer, John Kapoor, was convicted by a federal jury of racketeering conspiracy.

Hadland's work has also examined drug company marketing of stimulant medications to treat attention deficit hyperactivity disorder (ADHD), the effects of prescription drug monitoring programs on adolescent injection drug use, and treatment for teens addicted to nicotine.

Hadland's writing on various health-related topics has appeared in USA Today, CNN and Newsweek. He has also appeared on CNN News to discuss COVID-19 related issues and quoted by ABC News.

== Personal life ==
Hadland is married and lives in Boston with his husband, Jason Vassy, and two children.
