= Akorn =

American generic pharmaceuticals manufacturer

Akorn Operating Company LLC
- Formerly: Akorn Inc.
- Type: Private
- Traded as: Nasdaq: AKRX; OTC Pink: AKRXQ
- Industry: Pharmaceutical
- Founded: 1971; 55 years ago
- Defunct: 2023
- Fate: Bankruptcy
- Headquarters: Lake Forest, Illinois, U.S.
- Website: www.akorn.com

Akorn Operating Company LLC (Akorn Inc. prior to its bankruptcy) was an American generic pharmaceuticals manufacturer based in Lake Forest, Illinois. The company dealt in developing, manufacturing and marketing of generic and prescription drugs as well as animal and consumer health products. It was a component of the NASDAQ Biotechnology Index.

== History ==
John Kapoor is not the founder but has been a major shareholder since the 1990s.

Akorn acquired rival Hi-Tech Pharmacal in 2013.

In June 2015, it was reported that a hacker was trying to sell an Akorn customer database of more than 50,000 records. Akorn commented that "Although much of the information acquired is publicly available, we are in the process of notifying our valued customers about this incident".

In April 2017, Akorn agreed to be acquired by Fresenius for $4.3 billion. These plans were abandoned by Fresenius after Akorn couldn't meet basic requirements for an acquisition.

In October 2018, Akorn received Abbreviated New Drug Application approval from the Food and Drug Administration for Bimatoprost Ophthalmic Solution, 0.03%.

On May 21, 2020, Akorn filed for Chapter 11 bankruptcy and entered in to a Restructuring Support Agreement with lenders, which represents over 75 percent of its secured debt. The filing is to assist with an in-court sale of the company "while addressing litigation-related overhangs and best positioning the business for long-term success under new ownership".

On September 14, 2022, Akorn was sued by the government for its pricings. Akorn paid $7.9 Million to "Resolve Allegations of Fraudulent Billing".

On February 22, 2023, on a brief Teams call, Akorn CEO Douglas Boothe announced that the company had filed for Chapter 7 bankruptcy. All operations were ceased, and all employees were laid off, effective immediately.
