= Haron =

Haron is a masculine given name and surname of Arabic origin. Notable people with the name include:

== Given name ==
- Haron Amin (1969–2015), Afghan politician and diplomat
- Haron Din (1940–2016), Malaysian politician
- Haron Keitany (born 1983), Kenyan athlete
- Haron Shakava (born 1992), Kenyan footballer

== Surname ==
- Abdul Halim Haron, Singaporean bodybuilder
- Abdullah Haron (1924–1969), South African imam
- Hasnim Haron (born 1966), Singaporean footballer
- Idris Haron (born 1966), Malaysian politician
- Ismail Haron (1946–2012), Singaporean singer
- Tiago Haron (born 1993), Brazilian footballer

== See also ==
- Dorris Haron Kasco (born 1966), Ivorian photographer
- Anna t'Haron (born 1978), Russian pianist
- Harlon, given name
