= William Kendall Gale =

British missionary (1873–1935)

William Kendall Gale (20 June 1873 – 6 July 1935) was a pioneering English Methodist missionary in northern Madagascar between 1908 and his death in 1935.

== Life and work ==
Kendall Gale was born in Addingham, Yorkshire, the son of a master stonemason and Methodist preacher. He was baptised at Mount Hermon Wesleyan Reform Church, as it was then known, in July 1873. He was educated at Addingham National School, leaving at 15 to work for a Burnley firm.

After studying in London, he returned to Addingham as pastor of Mount Hermon. In September 1908, he left for Madagascar with his wife and children, to serve as a missionary with the London Missionary Society. Some of the locals were initially hostile, and met him armed with spears and axes. He also suffered malaria, black water fever and dysentery.

Kendall Gale and his family returned to England every five years and his work gained a following. In 1918 he published a report of his journey to the Marofotsy, Sihanaka and Bezanozano peoples. He established over 250 village churches in Madagascar, plus schools for training teachers. He had intended to retire in 1937, hoping to have established 300 churches. However, he suffered complications from an operation and died in 1935 in Anjozorobe, Tananarive. He is thought to have founded more churches than any other LMS missionary.

Kendall Gale wrote an account of his work in Madagascar which was published posthumously.

A plaque in his honour was unveiled at Mount Hermon Chapel in September 2011.

== Biographies ==
- Harold A. Ridgwell, Kendall Gale: Pioneer Missionary in North Madagascar 1908-1935. London: Livingstone Press, 1935.
- Joyce Reason, Go and Find It!: Kendall Gale of Madagascar. London: Edinburgh House Press, 1942.
- Albert Frederick Bayly, Kendall Gale. London: London Missionary Society, 1960.
