= Elsie Plant =

British birth control activist (1890–1982)

Elsie Plant (1890–1982) was a suffragette, socialist and birth control activist. She lived most of her life in Stockport, seven miles from Manchester. She was an enthusiastic campaigner of the suffrage movement. Following her campaigning as a suffragette, she and her husband became key figures in Stockport's Labour Fellowship. She had three daughters: Aileen, Roma and Joyce. Aileen became a nursery school head teacher and traveller; Roma was a business woman and retail owner, and Joyce was a writer, teacher and philosopher.

== Political activism and influence ==
Elsie was a key advocate of birth control. She attempted to open a birth control clinic in Stockport in 1923. Through her activism, she became friends with Marie Stopes, and arranged for her to lecture to an audience of over two thousand at the Armoury in Stockport. Unfortunately, Elsie's attempt was unsuccessful due to opposition from the Roman Catholic Church. However, her work was instrumental in the advocation and representation of birth control in Britain. She was one of the four local women for whom Suffragette Square in Stockport was named on International Women's Day in 2018 (the others being Elizabeth Raffald, Hannah Winbolt and Gertrude Powicke).
