= Gertrude Powicke =

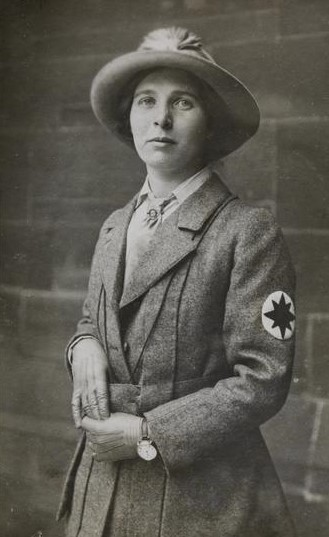
Gertrude Mary Powicke during WW1

Gertrude Powicke (19 December 1887 – 20 December 1919) was a teacher and relief worker. She was one of the first women graduates of Manchester University. She was a suffrage campaigner and worked with the Friends War Victims Relief Committee (FWVRC) in France during the First World War.

== Life ==
Gertrude Mary Powicke was born on 19 December 1887 in Hatherlow, near Stockport, UK. She was educated in Milton Mount College in Gravesend, Kent. She was one of the early women graduates from the Victoria University of Manchester, gaining a degree in Modern Languages in 1911. She then worked as a teacher at the Manchester High School for Girls. She became a suffrage campaigner with the National Union of Women's Suffrage Societies (NUWSS) and was the co-founder and treasurer of the Romiley branch of the North of England Women's Suffrage Society. During the First World War, she volunteered to work with the Quaker nurses of the Friends War Victims Relief Committee (FWVRC) in Bar-le-Duc, France. She travelled with the FWVRC to Poland in 1919 to treat a typhus outbreak and contracted the disease herself during a hospital tour. She died of typhus in Warsaw, Poland, on 20 December 1919. Her death was not officially recognised by the British government or the Commonwealth War Graves Commission. Powicke is buried in Warsaw's Evangelical-Reformed cemetery and she also has an inscription on the Powicke family grave in Hatherlow churchyard.

== Awards and memorials ==
Powicke is the only woman honoured on the University of Manchester's war memorial behind Whitworth Hall. She is the only woman named on any war memorial in Stockport via a plaque on the Heaton Moor war memorial. She is also one of the four local women for whom Suffragette Square in Stockport was named by Stockport Metropolitan Borough Council on International Women's Day in 2018 (the others being Elizabeth Raffald, Elsie Plant and Hannah Winbolt).
