= Hazel Alden Reason =

English chemist and educator (1901 – 1976)

- Born: April 1901; Friern Barnet, London, England
- Died: 1976 (aged 74–75)
- Education: Bedford College
- Known for: The Road to Modern Science
- Relatives: Joyce Reason (sister)

Hazel Alden Reason (April 1901 – 1976) was an English chemist who became a schoolteacher. She was the author of a popular book for young people on the general history of chemistry.

== Life and works ==
Hazel Reason was born in Friern Barnet, London. Her father was a Congregational minister, Will Reason, who campaigned and wrote on aspects of social justice and poverty in several books such as The Social Problem for Christian Citizens (1913), Homes and Housing (1919), and Drink and the Community (1920). Both her parents were university graduates.

Reason was educated at Milton Mount College in Gravesend, Kent. She graduated from Bedford College in 1924 with a BSc in Chemistry, and then obtained a position as a senior science mistress at the County School for Girls, Guildford. In her spare time there, she studied for an MSc (London) on the History of Science, which she completed in 1936. She was elected a Chemical Society Fellow that same year.

Hazel Reason remained unmarried and died in 1976. For much of her life, she lived at 102 Addison Road in Guildford in west Surrey, England, with her sister, the writer Joyce Reason.

== History of science ==
Hazel Reason's book on the history of science, The Road to Modern Science, was published in 1936. A second edition appeared in 1940 and a third, revised edition in 1950. Reason's Foreword includes her comment that her object was to present the story of scientific discovery in a form that would appeal to intelligent boys and girls. She said she did not approve of the "great scientist approach", preferring instead that her book cover "the broad view of scientific discovery."
