= David Stuurman =

Khoi chief and political activist

- Born: circa 1773; Gamtoos River, Eastern Cape
- Died: 22 February 1830; Sydney, Australia
- Occupations: Khoi chief and political activist

David Stuurman (c. 1773 – 22 February 1830) was a Khoi chief and political activist who fought against Dutch and British colonial administration. His active career as Khoi leader spanned twenty years (1799-1819) and the three Xhosa Wars which fell within this period.

== Early life ==
David Stuurman was a leader of the Khoekhoe people, who fought the Khoikhoi–Dutch Wars against the Dutch Cape Colony. Stuurman became involved in political activism during the 18th century when both the Khoi and San people were systematically dispossessed of their lands under “on ordinance by the colonists”. This meant that Stuurman, and other indigenous people, were forced to live and work on their land as labourers.

As a teenager, Stuurman went out to work on the farm of the Vermaak family, who owned a farm at Gamtoos. Among numerous incidents reported by the Bethelsdorp missionaries concerning the mistreatment of the Khoi and San at the hands of the colonialists, is a report on the poor treatment and physical abuse Johannes “Hannes” Vermaak meted out to Stuurman. The missionaries report details how Stuurman was tied to a wagon and beaten with a sjambok; after the beating salt was rubbed into his wounds and he was left tied to the wagon in the blistering sun.

During the 1790s, when the Second Xhosa War was being fought, Stuurman, his brother Klaas, the chief and their family abandoned Vermaak's farm along with several other Khoi in the region.

== Political career ==
The Khoi joined forces with the Xhosa tribes and refused to return to the farm lands, thus they were labelled “the rebel captains”. They refused to return to the farms they were indentured on and many went to live at the Bethelsdorp Mission Station, near Algoa Bay.

In August, 1802, in an effort to regain Khoi independence, Stuurman led 700 men and 300 horsemen with 150 firearms, against Uniondale field cornet. In an effort to establish peace after the skirmish, Governor Francis Dundas granted land to Klaas Stuurman and his men.

In 1803, Klaas Stuurman died during a buffalo hunting expedition and David succeeded him as the chief. Richard Collins later wrote that David was suspected, even by some Khoi, to be behind his brother’s death; however, contemporary sources do not seem to mention these suspicions.

After his brother’s death Stuurman offered refuge to escaped slaves and other fugitives. They refused to appear before General Jacob Cuyler about the matter of the fugitives and as a result, the authorities bore down on their settlement.

Many of the Khoi were bound into service, their livestock and land were confiscated, and David and three others were imprisoned in Cape Town in early 1809. On 11 September, David Stuurman was officially charged and sent to Robben Island—he was among the first political prisoners to be jailed on the island. His crime was cited as “Disobedience to the Field Cornet”. Four of Stuurman's children were kept by Cuyler as slaves.

By December, Stuurman and others had escaped Robben Island using whaling boats to reach the mainland. Most of them were recaptured, but Stuurman made his way back to the Eastern Cape.

He remained uncaptured until the fifth Xhosa War when he was captured again and put to hard labour on Robben Island. On the 9th of August 1820, Stuurman escaped from Robben Island again. This time during a prison mutiny orchestrated by Johan Smit, Hans Trompetter and Abraham Leendert.

Stuurman was captured when he reached the mainland and was tried for his crimes. He was now a two-time escapee from Robben Island, but at the trial at least one white overseer vouched for him based on a previous incident, saying he owed his life to Stuurman. Whereas Smit and Trompetter were condemned to hang, Stuurman was sentenced to life imprisonment on the penal settlement at New South Wales. On 16 December 1820 he was sent to Robben Island for the third time, where he would wait until a suitable transport ship arrived. In 1823, the convict ship Brampton arrived in Table Bay, and Stuurman and eleven other convicts (including another Khoikhoi, Jantjie Piet) were moved onto the vessel. On 20 February of that year, the Brampton set sail for Australia with the convicts on board. Stuurman never saw the continent of Africa again.

== Exile ==
In April 1823, the Brampton reached Sydney with Stuurman and the 11 other South Africans on board. After six years in government service, working at military barracks, Stuurman obtained a ticket of leave which allowed him to work for wages. His wife drew up a petition to Queen Victoria for his freedom but nothing came of it, as Stuurman would die before his release was ordered.

On 22 February 1830, David Stuurman died and was buried in the Roman Catholic section of Devonshire Street Cemetery. This cemetery was later resumed for Central railway station. It is likely that his remains were relocated to Bunnerong Cemetery, which is now part of Botany Cemetery, though this is unclear.

== Legacy ==
In 2015, a statue was erected at the National Heritage Monument in Pretoria in honour of Stuurman’s memory. During the same year, protesters called for the removal of 112-year old statue of Queen Victoria which stands outside the Port Elizabeth library and replace it with a statue of David Stuurman.

Plans by the National Heritage Council to repatriate the human remains of David Stuurman from Sydney were anticipated to be realised in April 2014, as a part of the events to commemorate and celebrate 20 years of democracy in South Africa. However, his remains were unable to be precisely located because a train station was built over the cemetery where he was buried. After years-long negotiations between multiple stakeholders, including Australian and South African authorities, traditional spiritual repatriation ceremonies went ahead in 2017.

On 13 June 2017, a traditional ceremony was conducted in Sydney to repatriate the spirit of David Stuurman. The spiritual repatriation involved the use of umphafa tree branches to carry Stuurman’s spirit. A second spiritual repatriation was conducted at the Sarah Baartman Heritage Centre in Hankey to put Stuurman to rest.

On 23 February 2021, Port Elizabeth Airport was renamed to Chief Dawid Stuurman International Airport in his honour.

Chief Dawid Stuurman International Airport, Qceberha, Eastern Cape, South Africa.

== See also ==
- Khoikhoi-Dutch Wars
- Xhosa Wars
