= Cook Islands Christian Church =

Religious denomination in the Cook Islands

- Abbreviation: CICC
- Classification: Protestant
- Orientation: Reformed
- Polity: Congregational
- Moderator: Rev. Tuaine Ngametua
- Associations: World Council of Churches, Pacific Conference of Churches, Council for World Mission
- Region: Cook Islands, Australia, New Zealand
- Headquarters: Rarotonga
- Origin: 1852 (as Cook Islands LMS Church); 1968 (autonomous)
- Branched from: London Missionary Society
- Congregations: 78
- Members: ~18,000
- Seminaries: Takamoa Theological College
- Official website: cicc.net.ck

The Cook Islands Christian Church (CICC) is the largest religious denomination in the Cook Islands. It belongs to the Reformed family of churches. The CICC is a Christian Congregationalist church and has approximately 18,000 members, including around half of the residents of the Cook Islands. The church also has congregations in New Zealand and Australia.

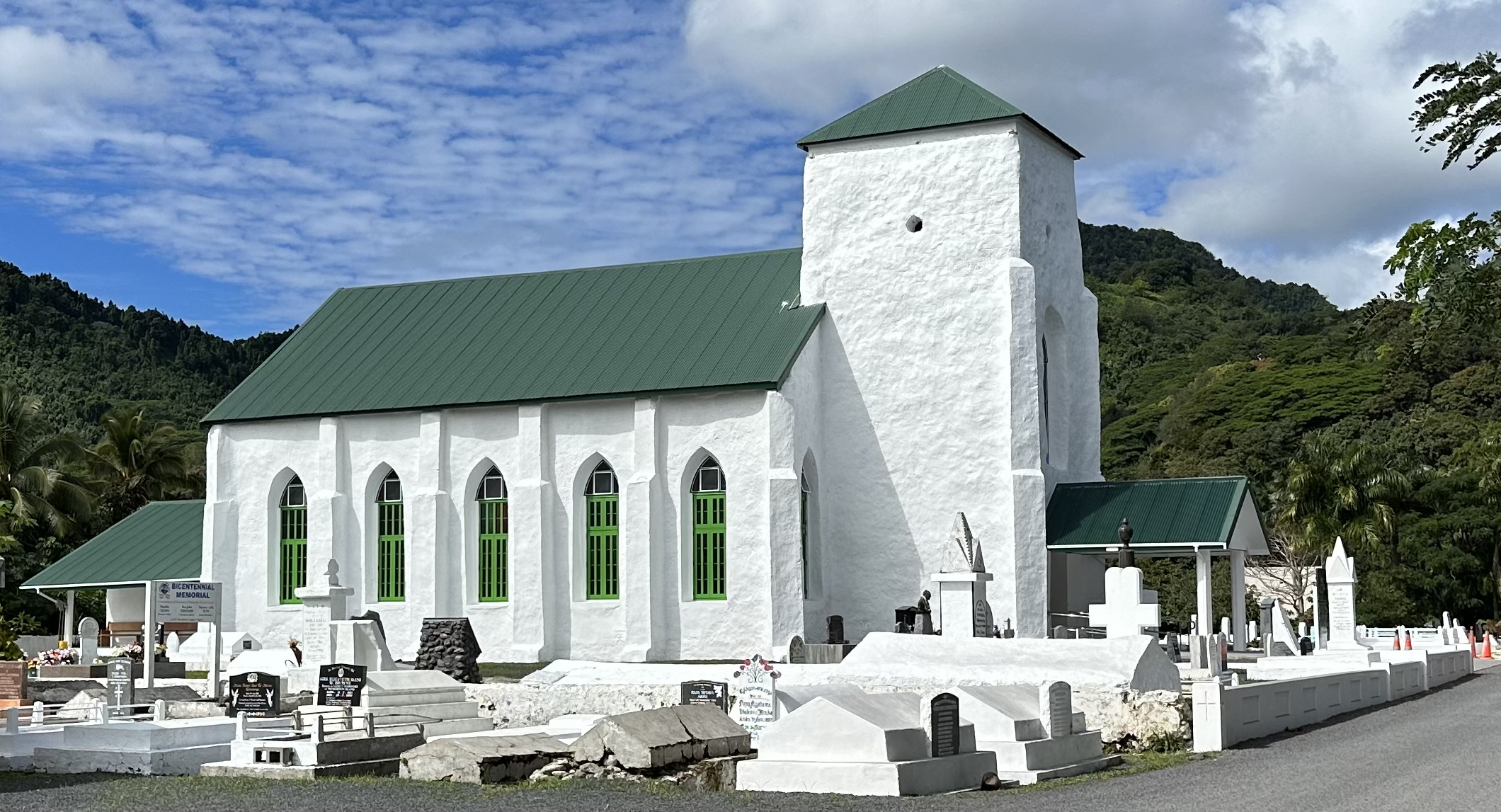
CICC church in Avarua, Rarotonga

== History ==
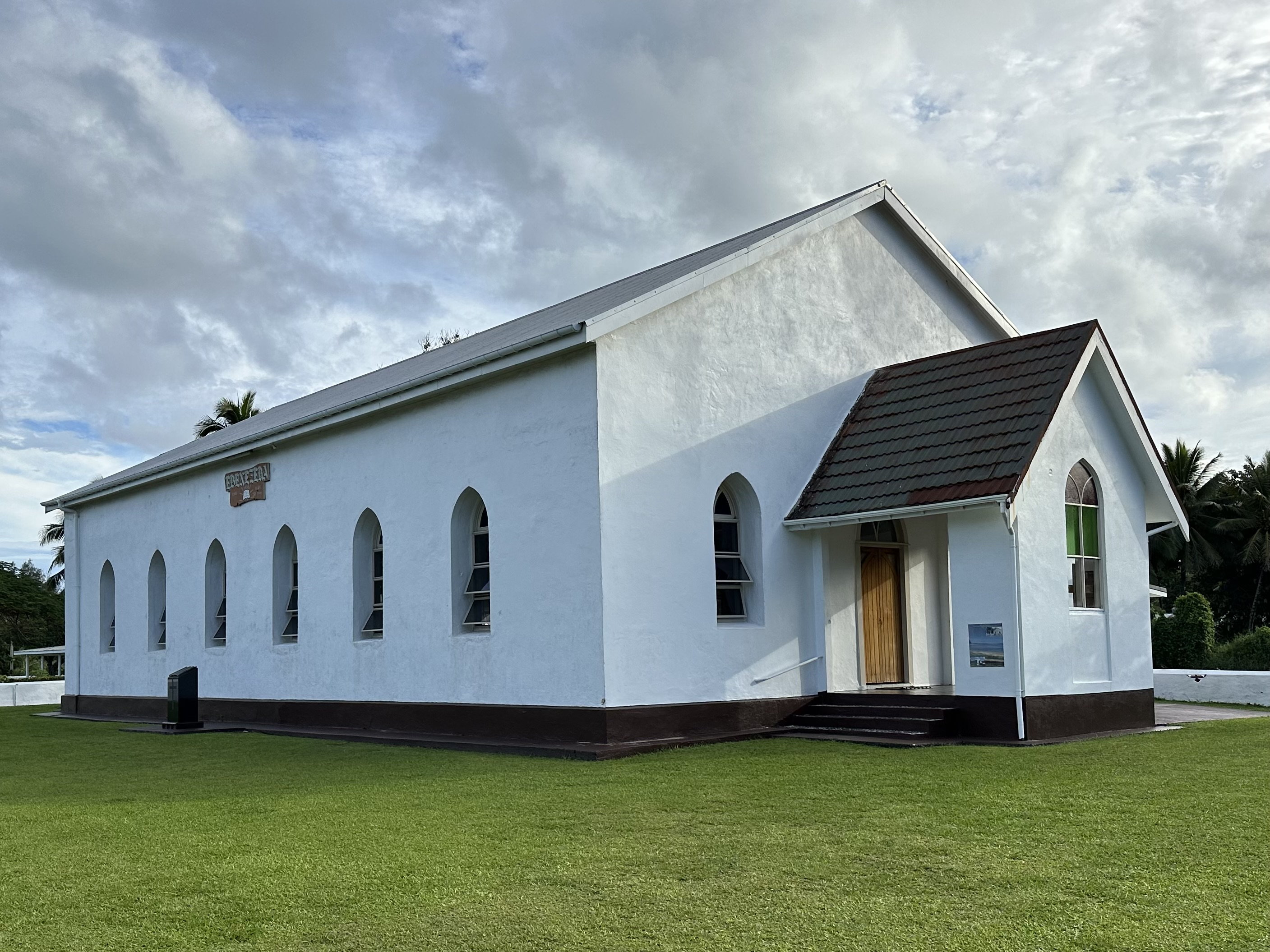
Ebenezera Church

The CICC has its origins in the work of the London Missionary Society (LMS), which began work in the Cook Islands in 1821. In 1852, the LMS founded the Cook Islands LMS Church. The church became autonomous in 1968 with the passage of the Cook Islands Christian Church Incorporation Act by the Parliament of the Cook Islands. This Act officially changed the church's name to the Cook Islands Christian Church. The first president of the CICC after the Act was passed was Bill Marsters, who in the late 1970s was forced to resign his position when he became involved in a scandal involving missing church funds.

== Modern day ==
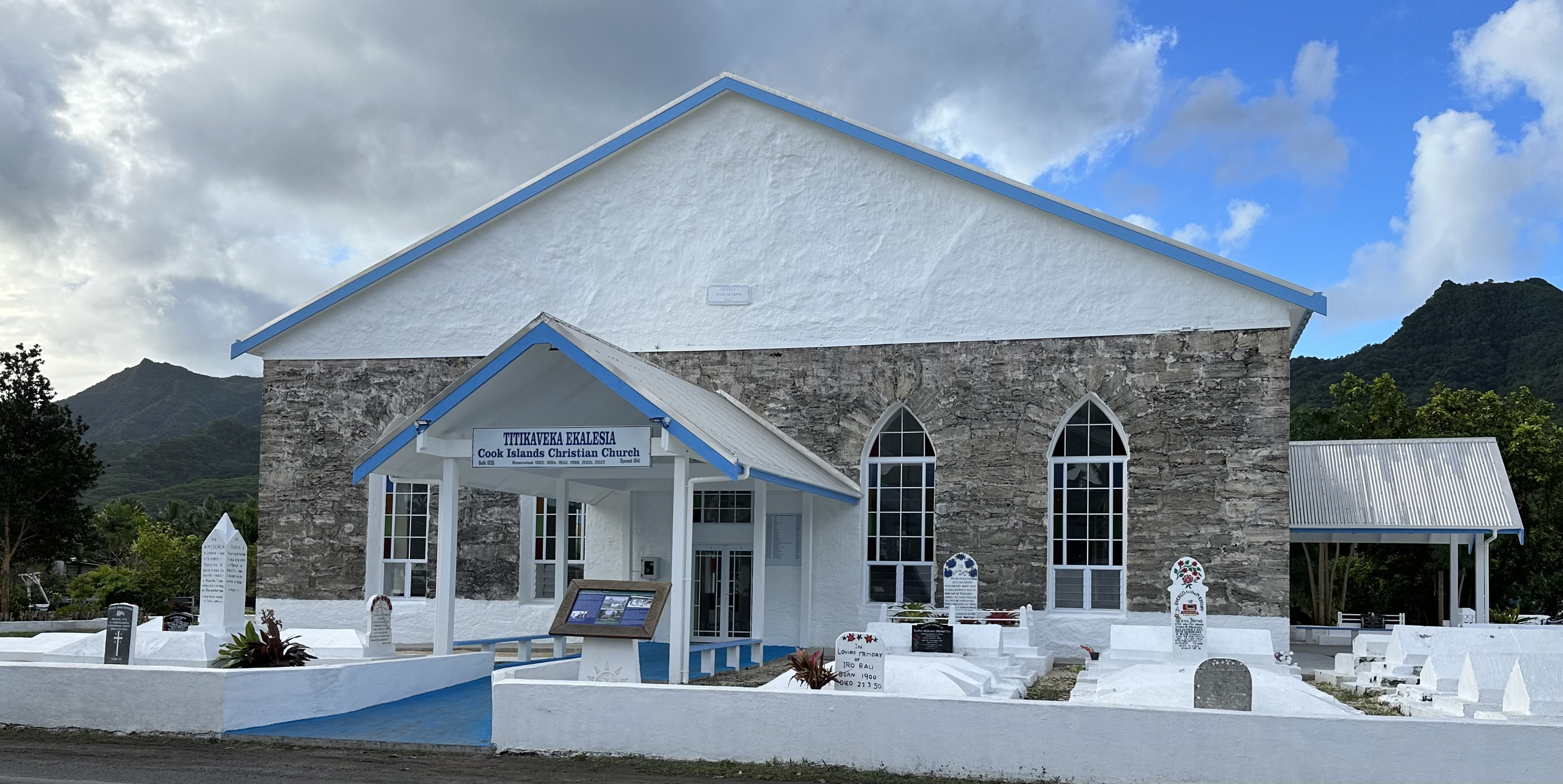
Titikaveka Church

In 1978, the CICC established its first congregation in Auckland in order to accommodate church members who had emigrated to New Zealand. Today, there are 24 congregations in the Cook Islands, 22 churches in New Zealand and 15 in Australia. The church employs 74 pastors, who are trained at Takamoa Theological College on Rarotonga. The CICC is a member of the World Council of Churches.

With the passage of the Cook Islands Christian Church Amendment Act by the Parliament of the Cook Islands in 2003, the CICC is permitted to alter its constitution without any action from Parliament.

The church has sister church relations with the Uniting Church in Australia, Presbyterian Church of Aotearoa New Zealand, the Congregational Union of New Zealand and the Maói Protestant Church.

== Presidents ==
#	President	Term
1	Rev. Bill Marsters	1968–1970s
	Rev. Turaki (Turaliare) Teauariki	Early 1980s
	Rev. Tekere Pereeti	c. 1991
	Rev. Tangimetua Tangatatutai	c. 2000–2010
	Rev. Tuaine Ngametua	c. 2013–present
