= Insys Therapeutics =

Former American pharmaceutical manufacturer

- Type: Public
- Traded as: Nasdaq: INSY
- Industry: Pharmaceutical
- Founded: 1990; 36 years ago
- Founder: John Kapoor
- Fate: Bankrupt (2019)
- Headquarters: Chandler, Arizona, U.S.
- Key people: Michael Babich (CEO)
- Products: Subsys (fentanyl); Syndros (Tetrahydrocannabinol)
- Number of employees: 343 (2019)

Insys Therapeutics was an American specialty pharmaceutical company based in Chandler, Arizona in 1990. Its main product was Subsys, a sublingual liquid form of the drug fentanyl. Fentanyl is an extremely fast-acting and powerful opioid used to relieve breakthrough pain in cancer patients, and prescription of fentanyl in the US for such pain usually requires documented failure of more conservative therapies.

In its final phase the company and its executives faced legal issues related to the opioid crisis and marketing activities by the company, including accusations of bribes and misleading advertising. Several company executives were convicted of racketeering in a jury trial in May 2019.

Insys filed for bankruptcy in 2019. The filing came just 10 days after the company agreed to pay $225 million to settle separate criminal and civil cases brought by the U.S. Justice Department.

The 2023 movie Pain Hustlers is based on the story of Insys.

== Products ==
In addition to Subsys, Insys Therapeutics marketed Syndros, a synthetic THC product, and was working toward approval of other cannabis derivatives. Despite delta-9 THC being classified as a Schedule I substance by the U.S. Drug Enforcement Administration, Syndros was classified as a Schedule II substance used in adults to treat loss of appetite (anorexia) in people with AIDS who have lost weight, as well as nausea and vomiting caused by anti-cancer medicines (chemotherapy) in people whose nausea and vomiting have not improved with usual anti-nausea medicines. Syndros was the first and only FDA-approved liquid THC formulation, which allows for fast absorption, flexible dosing, and a potential solution for patients who may prefer a liquid medication. The disparity between the US DEA scheduling of THC and of Syndros is pre- and post-formulation, respectively, according to Title 21 United States Code of Controlled Substances Act.

== History ==
The company was founded in 1990 by American multi-millionaire John Kapoor, who served as CEO and president after former CEO Michael Babich was arrested. Kapoor retired from Insys in 2017 due to racketeering conspiracy charges and was ultimately replaced by Saeed Motahari.

Insys had a practice of paying doctors speaking fees to promote their products. They had set up the Insys Reimbursement Center, in which Insys workers would call insurers on behalf of doctors’ offices to get them to authorize payment for Subsys. Even though Subsys was only supposed to be for cancer related patients, the workers would mislead the insurers into paying for it. In 2012, a sales rep for Insys filed a whistleblower lawsuit against the company. He gathered documents, emails and even audio recordings to bolster his case, yet the government declined to intervene.

In March 2013, the company had its IPO. The public paid no attention to the lawsuit and accusations, and the company was the best performing IPO that year.

In 2016, the company was ranked No. 52 on the Deloitte Fast 500 North America list.

In 2017, U.S. Senator Claire McCaskill released a report and audio recording of an Insys representative allegedly falsely claiming to represent a doctor's office and lying about a patient's diagnosis in order to circumvent prescribing rules for Subsys. Attorney Richard J. Hollawell obtained the audio recording from Envision in response to a subpoena for a civil suit he filed against Insys. The patient later died due to an adverse reaction to her medications.

A study done by physician and scientist Scott Hadland examined the marketing of Insys Therapeutics and found that it was responsible for half of all marketing dollars to doctors. Hadland's study was cited in a 2017 federal case against the company CEO John Kapoor and several executives, which resulted in their conviction by a federal jury of racketeering conspiracy.

== Political advocacy ==
In 2016, Insys donated $500,000 to Arizonans for Responsible Drug Policy, a group opposing a marijuana legalization ballot initiative in the state of Arizona. Investor filings confirm the company was concerned about the impact of legalization on sales for a cannabis-based drug it was developing. The reason publicly given for opposing the measure was to "protect children". However, medical marijuana advocates have criticized Insys' position as hypocritical, profit-driven, and an appeal to emotion, as the company actively developed its own cannabis-derived products. In a September 2016 statement, J.P. Holyoak, a representative from the pro-legalization campaign, commented, "It appears they are trying to kill a non-pharmaceutical market for marijuana in order to line their own pockets." That same month, the opposition campaign defended Insys' involvement, stating: "We are grateful that Insys Therapeutics – an Arizona-based company – has chosen to join Governor Ducey, the Arizona Association of County School Superintendents, the Arizona Small Business Association, the Arizona Hospital and Healthcare Association, the Arizona Catholic Conference of Bishops, the Arizona Chamber of Commerce and several other community organizations in defeating Prop. 205 in November." The ballot measure eventually failed to pass, losing 51.32% to 48.68%.

== Litigation and bankruptcy ==
In December 2016, seven former executives and managers employed by Insys were taken into custody, including CEO John Kapoor and charged with conspiracy to bribe medical staff in several states to prescribe a specific pain medication to their patients. The accusations were the topic of an NBC special feature report on Megyn Kelly's Sunday Night on June 4, 2017.

In August 2017, Insys Therapeutics was sued by Arizona Attorney General Mark Brnovich for misleading patients and doctors about the dangers of the drug Subsys, and for lying to insurers about the condition of the patients in a bid to get payment for the drug. He said the firm deceived insurers and pharmaceutical benefit companies into agreeing to pay for the expensive drug by misleading them to believe that the payment request was coming from a doctor's office and not the company making the drug. Brnovich also said those Insys employees misrepresented the medical conditions of the patients, lying that they had breakthrough pain, lying that the patients had tried other medications, and lying that the patients needed the sublingual spray rather than less expensive pills marketed by other firms because they had difficulty swallowing. Insys Therapeutics issued a response to the Arizona filing on their website, stating, in part, that "[t]he allegations contained in the Arizona Attorney General's complaint relate to former employees and physicians that are no longer associated with our Company or our speaker bureau."

In October 2017, Insys founder John Kapoor was arrested in Arizona and charged with RICO conspiracy, conspiracy to commit wire fraud, and conspiracy to violate the anti-kickback law related to Insys' effort to secure prescriptions of Subsys. Kapoor is also alleged to have conspired to defraud health insurance providers.

In December 2018, former Insys CEO Michael Babich agreed to plead guilty to one count of conspiracy and one count of mail fraud, in connection to bribes paid to doctors and their assistants. In April 2019, Alec Burlakoff, the former vice president of sales for Insys, agreed to pay the State of Arizona $9.5 million in a civil settlement with Attorney General Mark Brnovich for his role in the alleged bribery campaign of doctors to prescribe Insys products to patients. Brnovich had accused Burlakoff of operating a program that paid doctors lucrative "speaking fees" in order to encourage them to prescribe more Subsys, Insys' fentanyl-based pain medication. Burlakoff is required to pay the state $5.2 million from the proceeds he made from the operation, as well as $4.3 million in civil penalties. As part of the settlement, Burlakoff agreed to testify against Insys in ongoing litigation and will be permanently banned from advertising or selling any pharmaceutical drugs in Arizona.

On May 2, 2019, a federal jury found top executives of Insys Therapeutics guilty of racketeering charges. The jury, after deliberating for 15 days, issued guilty verdicts against the company's founder, the one-time billionaire John Kapoor, and four former executives, finding they had conspired to fuel sales of its highly potent drug, Subsys, by not only bribing doctors to prescribe its product but also by misleading insurers about patients' need for the drug. Other Insys employees also found guilty included Richard M. Simon, former national director of sales; Sunrise Lee, regional sales director; Joseph A. Rowan, regional sales director; and Michael J. Gurry, former vice president of managed markets. In June 2019, Insys Therapeutics agreed to pay $225 million to settle the federal government's criminal and civil investigations into the company's marketing practices. In January 2020, Kapoor was sentenced by a federal court to five and a half years in prison.

Insys filed for bankruptcy in Delaware Bankruptcy Court on June 10, 2019. Andrew Long, the company's CEO, claimed the company was struggling due to extensive litigation and declining revenues relating to its Subsys product. The bankruptcy filing came just 10 days after the company reached a settlement with the U.S. Justice Department. The U.S. government agreed to accept an unsecured claim of $190 million in the case.

== See also ==
- The Crime of the Century
