= Barbara Harland =

American nutritionist (1925–2020)

Barbara F. Harland
- Professor Harland
- Born: Chicago
- Education: Iowa State University; University of Washington
- Scientific career
- Fields: Biology, Nutrition
- Workplaces: Howard University, United States Department of Agriculture

Barbara F. Harland (1925 in Chicago- April 29, 2020) was a biologist, dietician, nutritionist, and professor of nutritional sciences at Howard University, within the College of Nursing and Allied Health Services.

Harland was licensed as a dietician and nutritionist by the State of Maryland and worked in the U.S. Department of Agriculture as a research biologist. In 1984, she accepted a faculty position at Howard University and served as a professor of nutritional sciences for over 30 years, where she was awarded tenure and joined the graduate faculty. She was also involved in supporting student aid and school supply funding, establishing the Dr. Barbara F. Harland Endowed Scholarship Fund for Nutrition in 2010.

Harland's primary area of research focus was on the chemical compound phytate.
