= James Penrose Harland =

American archaeologist (1891–1973)

James Penrose Harland (born February 5, 1891, in Wenonah, New Jersey, United States; Died February 7, 1973) was an American archaeologist of the ancient Aegean.

Harland earned his BA (1913), MA, and PhD from Princeton University and also completed service with the United States Navy during World War I. In addition to Princeton, he studied at the University of Bonn (1913–14). He would teach archaeology at the University of Michigan and the University of Cincinnati before joining the faculty of Classics at the University of North Carolina at Chapel Hill in 1922 as an assistant professor of classics. Harland became associate professor of archaeology in 1927 and professor of archaeology in 1929. He retired in 1963.

From 1926 to 1927 Harland excavated Late Helladic II (15th century BC) layers on the island of Aigina, in Greece. His work in those years was funded by the John Simon Guggenheim Memorial Foundation. In 1920-21 he held a fellowship at the American School of Classical Studies in Athens, Greece.

== Works ==
- Prehistoric Aigina, A History of the Island in the Bronze Age (1925; 1966).
