= Alfie Harland =

Irish footballer (1897–1968)

Personal information
- Full name: Alfred Ireland Harland
- Date of birth: 26 November 1897
- Place of birth: Cookstown, Ireland
- Date of death: 1968 (aged 70–71)
- Position: Goalkeeper

Senior career*
Years	Team	Apps	(Gls)
1921–1922	Linfield		
1922–1926	Everton	64	(0)
1926	Runcorn		
Total		64	(0)

International career
1922	Ireland	1	(0)
- * Club domestic league appearances and goals

Alfred Ireland Harland (26 November 1897–1968) was an Irish footballer who played in the Football League for Everton as a goalkeeper.
