= Harland C. Forbes =

President and chairman of Con Edison (1898–1990)

Harland C. Forbes (1898–1990) was the board chairman for Con Edison of New York, United States. Forbes worked at Con Edison for 41 years. In 1924, he started at the company as an assistant to the chief electrical engineer. At the time, the company was still named New York Edison Company. In 1932, he became systems engineer. After World War II, Mr. Forbes directed a $530 million expansion program in which the company created new power plants and improved existing ones.

He was named president in 1955 and chairman in 1957. He retired in December 1965.

He is the father of Barton Allan Forbes and Howard Forbes. Forbes was 92 years old when he died of pneumonia at the Memorial Hospital in Sarasota, Florida, on May 15, 1990.
