= John H. Harland Company =

American check printing company

John H. Harland Company is a major USA-based check-printing company. They were described in 2000 by The New York Times as "the second-largest printer of checks in the United States."

Their earnings are followed by The New York Times.

== History ==
The company's initial public offering was in 1969. By 1984, this financial services company had an estimated 20% of the USA check-printing market; only Deluxe Corporation was larger.

In the 2000s, the company began expanding into financial software. In 2000, it agreed to acquire Concentrex Inc., a Portland, Oregon–based developer of automation software for lending and customer service operations, as well as online banking software for small businesses. The acquisition, valued at about $140 million.

Two years later, they acquired another software company.
