= Bruce Harland =

Australian international rugby union player (born 1939)

- Full name: Bruce Joseph Harland
- Born: 13 October 1939 (age 87) Nyngan, NSW Australia
- Height: 185 cm (6 ft 1 in)
- Weight: 87 kg (192 lb)

Rugby union career
- Position: Centre
Provincial / State sides
| Years | Team | Apps | (Points) |
- New South Wales
International career
| Years | Team | Apps | (Points) |
| 1962 | Australia | | |

Bruce Joseph Harland (born 13 October 1939) is an Australian former international rugby union player.

Harland was born in Nyngan and attended St. Joseph's College, Hunters Hill.

A sturdy centre three-quarter, Harland played for Cobar and represented Central West against the touring 1960 All Blacks. This was followed by selection to the NSW Country XV which were winners of an interstate carnival in Sydney. In 1962, Harland gained international honours when he toured New Zealand with the Wallabies, where he made seven uncapped appearances. He had been named in the team for the 1st Test against the All Blacks in Wellington, but an ankle injury suffered against Horowhenua prevented his participation.

== See also ==
- List of Australia national rugby union players
