= Harlan =

Harlan is a given name and a surname which may refer to:

== Surname ==
- Abram D. Harlan (1833–1908), American politician from Pennsylvania
- Bill Harlan (born 1940), American winemaker
- Bob Harlan (1936–2026, Robert E. Harlan), American football executive
- Bruce Harlan (1926–1959), American Olympic diver
- Byron B. Harlan (1886–1949), American politician
- Byron G. Harlan (1861–1936), American singer
- Jack Rodney Harlan (1917–1998), American botanist
- James Harlan (Iowa politician), (1820–1899), American politician and lawyer
- James Harlan (Kentucky politician) (1800–1863), American politician and lawyer
- Jan Harlan (born 1937), German-American film director and producer
- John Harlan (announcer) (1925–2017), American television announcer
- John Marshall Harlan (1833–1911), United States Union Army officer and Supreme Court Associate Justice
- John Marshall Harlan II (1899–1971), American lawyer and jurist, Associate Justice of the United States Supreme Court
- Josiah Harlan (1799–1871), American mercenary
- Kevin Harlan (born 1960), American sportscaster
- Otis Harlan (1865–1940), American actor
- Patrick Harlan (born 1970), American-Japanese television presenter
- Peter Harlan (1898–1966), German musical instrument maker and lute player
- Richard Harlan (1796–1843), American zoologist
- Russell Harlan (1903–1974), American cinematographer
- Ryan Harlan (born 1981), American decathlete
- Silas Harlan (1753–1782), American settler and militiaman
- Thomas Harlan (1929–2010), German film director and writer
- Veit Harlan (1899–1964), German film director and actor

== Given name ==
- Harlan Ala'alatoa (born 1988), Australian Rugby League player
- Harlan Briggs (1879–1952), American actor, vaudeville performer
- Harlan M. Calhoun (1903–1977), justice of the Supreme Court of Appeals of West Virginia
- Harlan Coben (born 1962), American novelist
- Harlan Cohen (1934–2020), American volleyball coach
- Harlan Ellison (1934–2018), American writer
- Harlan Greene (born 1953), American writer and historian
- Harlan Howard (1927–2001), American country music songwriter
- Harlan Hubbard (1900–1988), American artist and author
- Harlan Huckleby (born 1957), American football running back
- Harlan Lane (1936-2019), American psychologist
- Harlan Marbley (1943–2008), American boxer
- Harlan Mills (1919–1996), American professor of computer science
- Harlan F. Stone (1872–1946), U.S. Supreme Court Justice
- Harlan Tarbell (1890-1960), American magician
- Harlan K. Ullman (born 1941), United States military officer and political author
- Jessie Harlan Lincoln (1875–1948), granddaughter of United States President Abraham Lincoln

== Fictional characters ==
- Harlan (Stargate), an artificial intelligence in the Stargate SG-1 episode "Tin Man"
- Harlan Rook, in the 1988 film The Dead Pool

== See also ==
- Christiane Kubrick (née Harlan) (born 1932), German actress, dancer, painter and singer
- Harland (name)
- Harlon, given name
