= John Kapoor =

Indian-American businessman

- Born: John Nath Kapoor; 1942 or 1943 (age 83–84); Amritsar, British India
- Education: Institute of Chemical Technology, Mumbai; University at Buffalo
- Known for: Convicted felon as a large shareholder of Akorn Pharmaceuticals; Founder and chairman, Insys Therapeutics
- Spouse: Editha Kapoor (deceased)
- Children: 4

John Nath Kapoor (born 1942/1943) is an American multi-millionaire, pharmaceutical entrepreneur, former CEO of Insys Therapeutics, and majority shareholder in the generic drug manufacturing company Akorn. In the fall of 2017, Kapoor was arrested and charged with numerous felony counts including RICO conspiracy, conspiracy to commit wire fraud, and other crimes. He was found guilty on all counts, and those convictions were upheld on appeal.

== Early life ==
John Nath Kapoor was born in Amritsar, Punjab Province, British India, into a family of modest means. He later moved to Mumbai, where he graduated from the Institute of Chemical Technology (formerly UDCT) with a degree in pharmacy. After moving to the United States, he attended the University at Buffalo on a scholarship and obtained a doctorate in medicinal chemistry in 1972.

== Career ==
Kapoor began his career in 1972 at Invenex Pharmaceutical in Grand Island, New York.

He worked his way up at LyphoMed, took the company public and oversaw its operations through a scandal involving lax production standards that resulted in several patients' deaths.

== Personal life ==
Kapoor moved from India to Lake Forest, Illinois. He has four children. The John and Editha Kapoor Charitable Foundation, which supports the fight against cancer, was named after his late wife Editha, who died of breast cancer. The University at Buffalo School of Pharmacy and Pharmaceutical Sciences named their building John and Editha Kapoor Hall, after a donation to the school by John, to honor him and his late wife. On June 3, 2019, the University at Buffalo passed a resolution to remove Kapoor's name from the UB Pharmacy School's building in light of Kapoor's RICO conviction.

== Legal issues ==
In October 2017, Kapoor was arrested in Arizona and charged with RICO conspiracy, conspiracy to commit wire fraud, and conspiracy to violate the Anti-Kickback Law. The charges stem from allegations that he participated in a scheme to bribe doctors to prescribe fentanyl, a powerful synthetic opioid manufactured under the brand name Subsys by his company Insys Therapeutics. U.S. Attorney William Weinreb said the charges reflected authorities' commitment to combat the opioid epidemic. Kapoor is also alleged to have conspired to defraud health insurance providers. Shortly after the charges were announced, Kapoor resigned from the Board of Insys Therapeutics.

On May 2, 2019, Kapoor was convicted of engaging in a racketeering conspiracy to increase the profits of his company's opiate painkiller, Subsys. On January 23, 2020, he was sentenced to 5.5 years in prison and described as a "former billionaire"; Federal prosecutors had asked for 15 years. His convictions and sentence were affirmed on appeal. Because of COVID-19, Kapoor delayed the start of his prison sentence. Kapoor was incarcerated at Duluth FPC, a minimum security federal prison camp and released in June 2023 after serving 2 years of 5-1/2 year sentence. The court also ordered him to pay $6.75 million in legal fines and $59 million in restitution. Kapoor was portrayed by Andy Garcia in the Netflix movie Pain Hustlers released in October 2023.
