= Harland C. Clark =

American politician (1917–1982)

Member of the South Dakota Senate
- In office 1967–1968

Personal details
- Born: Harland Calvin Clark; February 18, 1917 Lane, South Dakota, U.S.
- Died: November 17, 1982 (aged 65) Aberdeen, South Dakota, U.S.
- Party: Republican
- Education: Dakota Wesleyan University

Harland Calvin Clark (February 18, 1917 – November 17, 1982) was an American politician. He served as a Republican member of the South Dakota Senate.

== Life and career ==
Clark was born in Lane, South Dakota. He attended Dakota Wesleyan University, earning his Bachelor of Arts degree. He was a pilot in the United States Navy during World War II.

Clark served in the South Dakota Senate from 1967 to 1968.

== Death ==
Clark died on November 17, 1982, in Aberdeen, South Dakota, at the age of 65.
