= Justice Harlan =

Justice Harlan may refer to one of three Associate Justices of the United States Supreme Court:

- John Marshall Harlan (1833–1911)
- John Marshall Harlan II (1899–1971), grandson of the pre-World War I Justice Harlan
- Harlan F. Stone (1872–1946), though he is more correctly referred to by last name as Justice Stone
