= Harlan Hall =

Historic building in the US

- U.S. National Register of Historic Places
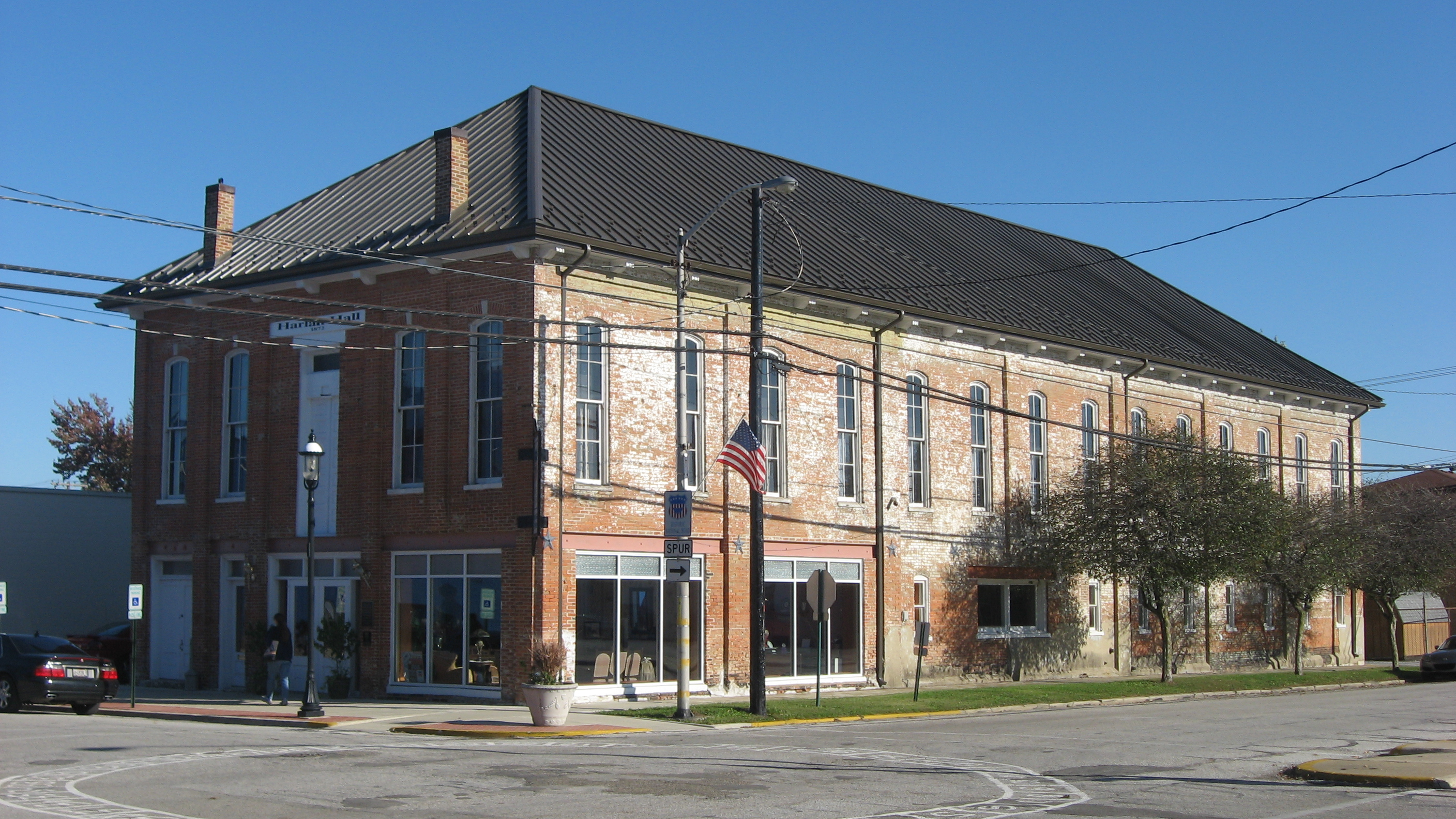

- Location within Illinois Location within the United States
- Location: 603 Locust St., Marshall, Illinois
- Coordinates: 39°23′22″N 87°41′42″W
- Area: less than one acre
- Architectural style: Italianate
- NRHP reference No.: 01001309
- Added to NRHP: November 29, 2001

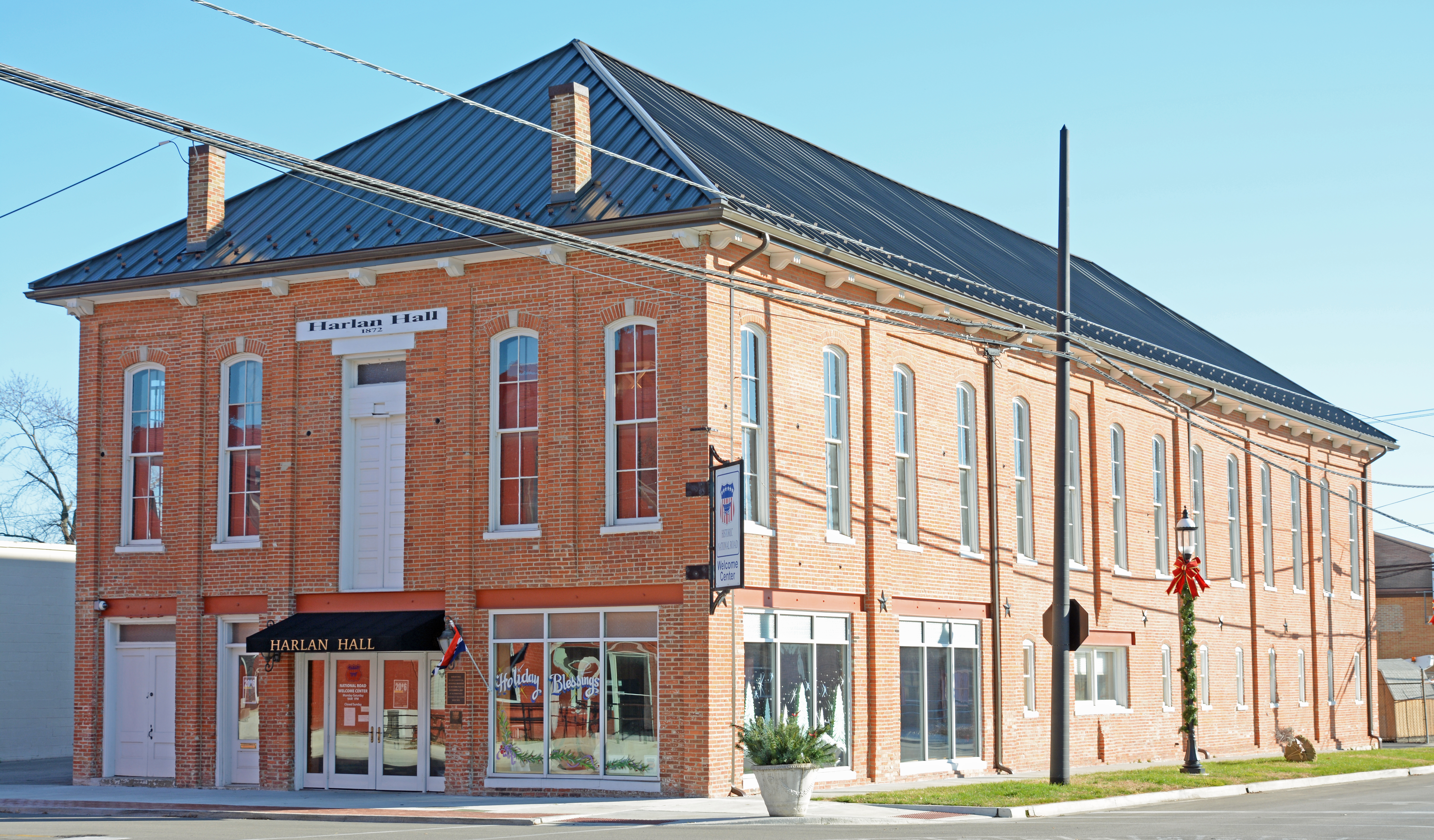
Harlan Hall in 2015

Harlan Hall is a historic opera house located at 603 Locust St. in Marshall, Illinois. The opera house opened in 1872 to provide a venue for theatrical performances in Marshall. The building has an Italianate design with tall, narrow windows, wide bracketed eaves, and a steeply sloping roof. Both local and traveling theatrical acts performed in the theater, which also hosted concerts, public meetings, and other events. The opera house had a livery stable on its first floor for its patrons' horses, an unusual feature for contemporary theaters. In 1904, B. F. Johnson purchased the building and converted it to a movie theater; while it still served as a civic auditorium, the building no longer showed theatrical performances after this point. The building has since held a Moose Lodge, and its first floor has been converted to a commercial space.

The building was added to the National Register of Historic Places on November 29, 2001.
