= Bob Harland (footballer) =

Australian rules footballer (1916–2006)

Personal information
- Full name: Bob Harland
- Born: 1 March 1916
- Died: 26 January 2006 (aged 89)
- Height: 191 cm (6 ft 3 in)
- Weight: 101 kg (223 lb)

Playing career^{1}
Years	Club	Games (Goals)
1944	Hawthorn	1 (0)
- ^{1} Playing statistics correct to the end of 1944.

Bob Harland (1 March 1916 – 26 January 2006) was an Australian rules footballer who played with Hawthorn in the Victorian Football League (VFL).
