= Takamoa Theological College =

Coordinates: 21.209°S 159.772°W

Takamoa Theological College is a Bible school located in Rarotonga, Cook Islands. It was founded by the noted Congregationalist missionary Aaron Buzacott in 1830. The College is run by the Cook Islands Christian Church.

It offers a Diploma of Theology and a Certificate of Bible Studies. The college trains pastors for the Cook Islands Christian Church. It has 23 branches in the Cook Islands, 20 in New Zealand, and 12 in Australia.

One of its most distinguished graduates was Ruatoka (1846?–1903), a pioneering missionary to Papua New Guinea.
