= Selina Hadland =

British headmistress (1838–1919)

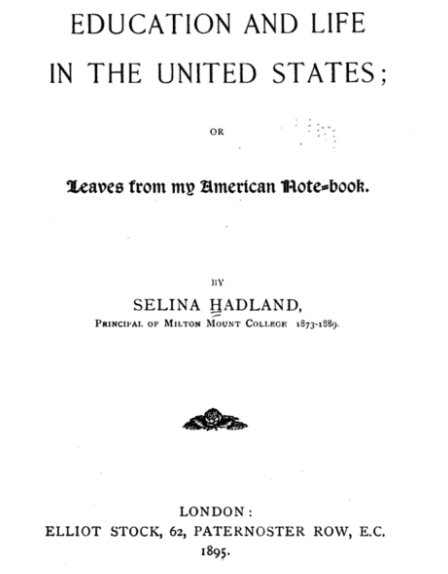
- hHer 1895 publication
- Born: 18 February 1838; London, England
- Died: 17 November 1919 (aged 81); St Leonards-on-Sea, England
- Occupation: Lady Principal
- Employer: Milton Mount College
- Successor: Ethel Mary Conder

Selina Hadland (18 February 1838 – 17 November 1919) was a writer and a British headmistress of Milton Mount College near Gravesend.

== Life ==
Hadland was born in London in 1838. She was one of the four children born to Sarah Ann (born Matthews) and Henry Hadland. Her father sold cheeses and he was in time the keeper of the City of London's Guildhall.

In 1871, she was accepted as the Lady Principal of the newly-founded Milton Mount College in Gravesend, Kent. The college was led by the Reverend William Guest and it was a boarding school for the daughters of ministers in the Congregational Church. The school had a management committee of Congregationalists who intended that the school should not only teach girls but it should aspire to make them teachers. She was chosen from 58 applicants. She was able to draw on her experience teaching at Surbiton House in Camberwell and Malvernbury in Great Malvern. She had letters from Christopher Newman Hall and Charles Spurgeon to support her application.

Hadland resigned from Milton Mount College in 1889 and she then wrote on educational matters. She was succeeded by Ethel Mary Conder who called herself "the headmistress".

In 1895, she and Ellen were able to visit America where they looked at education there. Hadland published her findings as, Education and Life in the United States: Or, Leaves from My American Note-book.

She was a founding governor of Battersea Polytechnic when it opened in the 1890s and she helped to found the Canning Town Women's Settlement in 1892 and served on its committee when Rebecca Cheetham was running it.

Hadland kept in contact with her former pupils. Holidays would be arranged in Switzerland and it was known that she sometimes paid for some of them to attend if they could not cover the costs themselves.

== Death and legacy ==
Hadland died in 1919 in St Leonards-on-Sea. Her funeral had a large number of people attending.
