= Motutapu (disambiguation) =

Motutapu is an island in New Zealand's Hauraki Gulf.

Motutapu or Motu Tapu may also refer to the following places:

== New Zealand ==
- Motutapu Island (Bay of Islands), Northland Region
- Motutapu Island (Karikari Peninsula), Northland Region
- Motutapu Point, Pitt Island, Chatham Islands

== French Polynesia ==
- Motutapu (Ua Huka), in Ua Huka
- Motu Tapu (Bora Bora), a small island close to Bora Bora

== Elsewhere ==
- Motutapu (Tonga)
- Motutapu (Cook Islands)
