= Avana Stream =

Location
- Country: Cook Islands

Physical characteristics
- Source
  - location: 21°14′13″S 159°45′52″W
- Mouth
  - location: 21°14′49″S 159°43′42″W
  - elevation: sea level
- Length: 8 km (5.0 mi)

The Avana Stream is a stream in the Ngatangiia district on Rarotonga in the Cook Islands. It flows in the Avana Valley and exits into the Muri Lagoon at Vaikai Tapere. A water intake on the stream supplies water to half of Rarotonga's population.

== See also ==
- List of rivers of the Cook Islands
