= List of mountains in the Cook Islands =

The Cook Islands consists of fifteen islands that range from mountainous volcanic islands, most notably Rarotonga, to low-lying coral atolls.

== Rarotonga ==
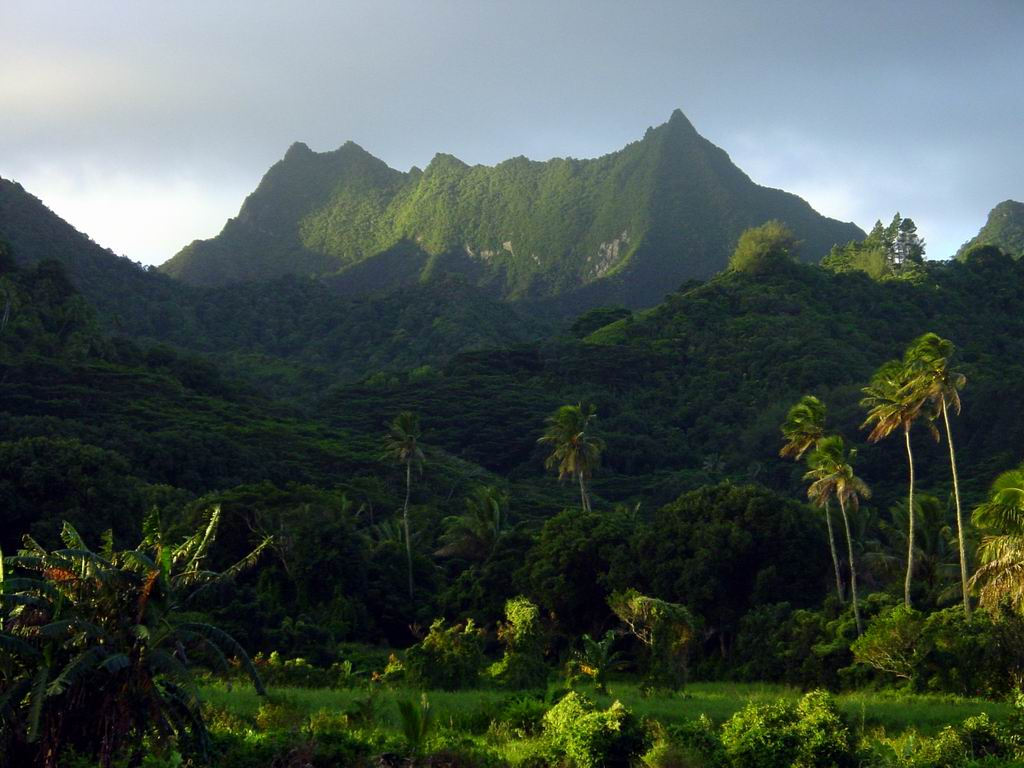
Te Manga, the highest mountain, viewed from Rarotonga's south coast

- Te Manga (652 m)
- Te Atu Kura (638 m)
- Te Kou (588 m)
- Maungatea (523 m)
- Maunga Roa (509 m)
- Ikurangi (485 m)
- Te Vaakauta (450 m)
- Te Rua Manga or the Needle (413 m)
- Raemaru (357 m)
- Toroume (329 m)
- Oroenga (292 m)

== Other islands ==
- Rangi-motia, Mangaia (169 m)
- Maunga Pu, Aitutaki, (123 m)
