= Raemaru =

Mountain in the Cook Islands

Coordinates: 21°14′06″S 159°48′45″W

Raemaru is a mountain on the island of Rarotonga in the Cook Islands. The peak of Raemaru is 357 meters above sea level, and is located in the central part of the country, 5 km southwest of the capital Avarua. Raemaru is part of the Pouraa Mountains.

The peak is the easiest to climb in Rarotonga. The terrain around Raemaru is hilly to the east, but to the northwest it is flat. The sea is near Raemaru to the southwest. The highest point nearby is Te Manga, 653 meters above sea level, 5.1 km east of Raemaru. The closest major community is Avarua, 5 km northeast of Raemaru. In the surroundings of Raemaru, mainly evergreen deciduous forest grows.

According to local legend, the mountain used to be called Maru and was taller, but part of it was cut off in the night and stolen by warriors from Aitutaki, who took it back to their island where it became Maunga Pu.
