= List of rivers of the Cook Islands =

This is a list of the rivers of the Cook Islands, all of which are located on Rarotonga. They are listed in clockwise order, starting at the north end of the island.

- Avatiu Stream
- Vaikapuangi Stream
- Takuvaine Stream
- Pue Stream
- Tupapa Stream
- Matavera Stream
- Turangi Stream
- Avana Stream
- Paringaru Stream
- Akapuao Stream
- Turoa Stream
- Totokoiru Stream
- Taipara Stream
- Papua Stream
- Ngatoa Stream
- Rutaki Stream
- Muriavai Stream
