= Mount Hikurangi =

Mount Hikurangi may refer to:

- Mount Hikurangi (Gisborne District), New Zealand
- Mount Hikurangi (Northland), New Zealand
- Hikurangi, a volcanic cone near Hikurangi, in Northland, New Zealand
- Hikurangi, a cone near Taumarunui, New Zealand

== See also ==
- Ikurangi, a peak in the Cook Islands
