= Ngatangiia =

Coordinates: 21°15′0.91″S 159°44′16.19″W

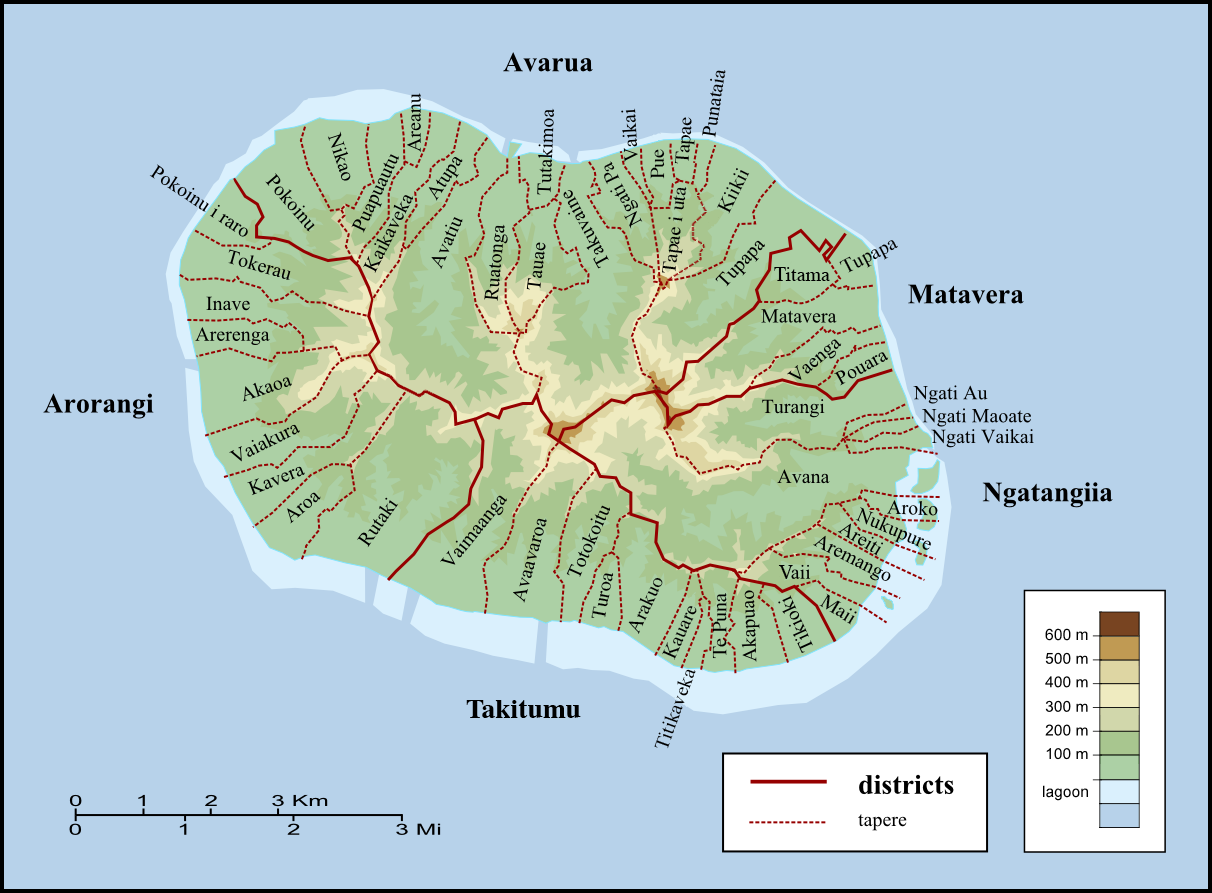
Districts and tapere of Rarotonga

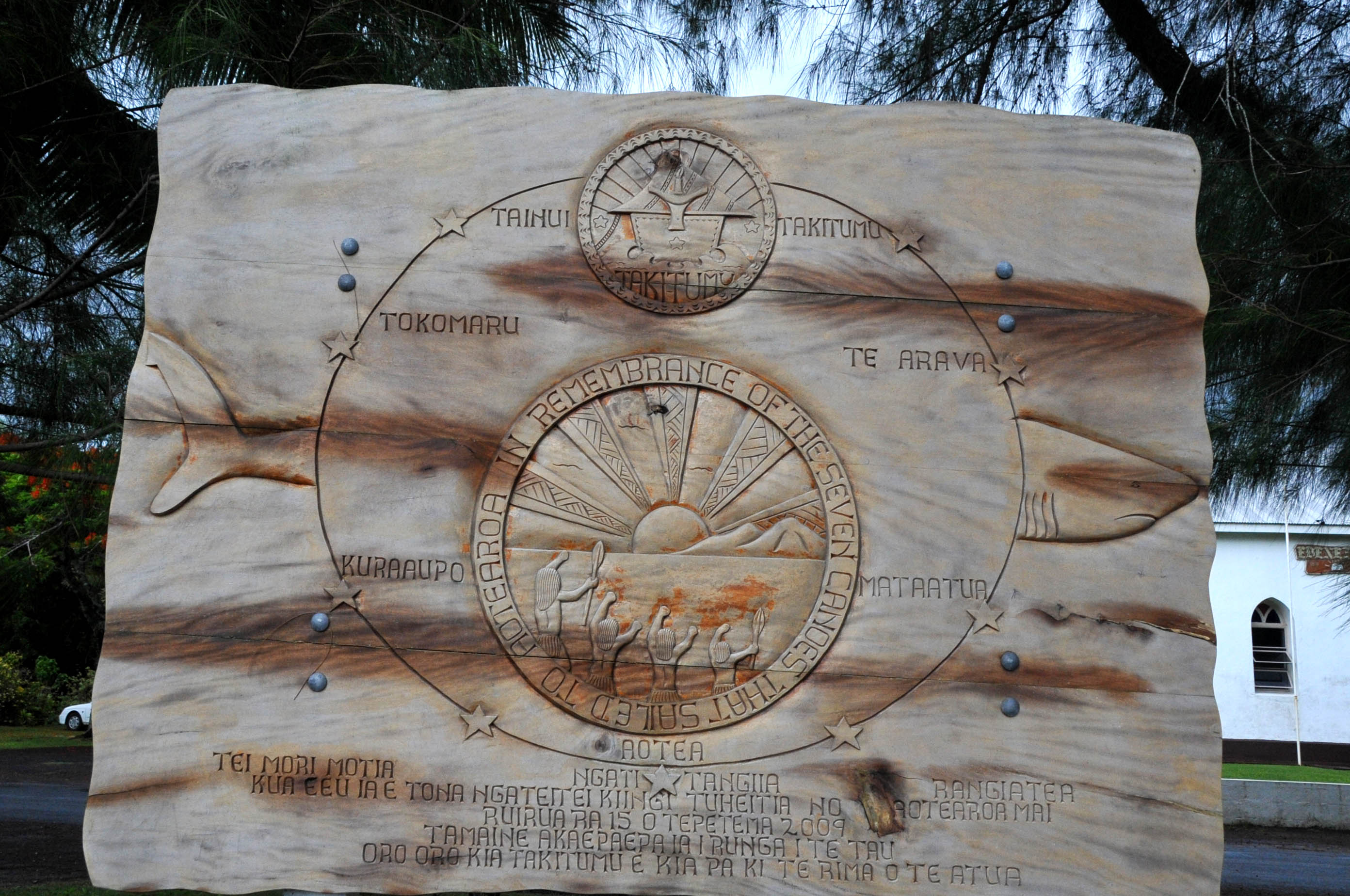
Commemorative marker at Ngatangiia Bay

Ngatangiia is one of the five districts of the island of Rarotonga in the Cook Islands. It is in the east of the island, to the south of the districts of Matavera and Avarua, and north-east of the district of Titikaveka. Features of the district include a memorial to the canoes that are said to have left Ngatangiia Harbout to colonise New Zealand, and Te Ara - Museum of Cultural Enterprise. Muri Lagoon is in Ngatangiia and is the widest part of Rarotonga's lagoon. Within Muri Lagoon are four small islets or motu, which are, from north to south:

- Motutapu, 10.5 hectares (26 acres)
- Oneroa, 8.1 hectares (20 acres)
- Koromiri, 2.9 hectares (7.2 acres)
- Taakoka, 1.3 hectares (3.2 acres)

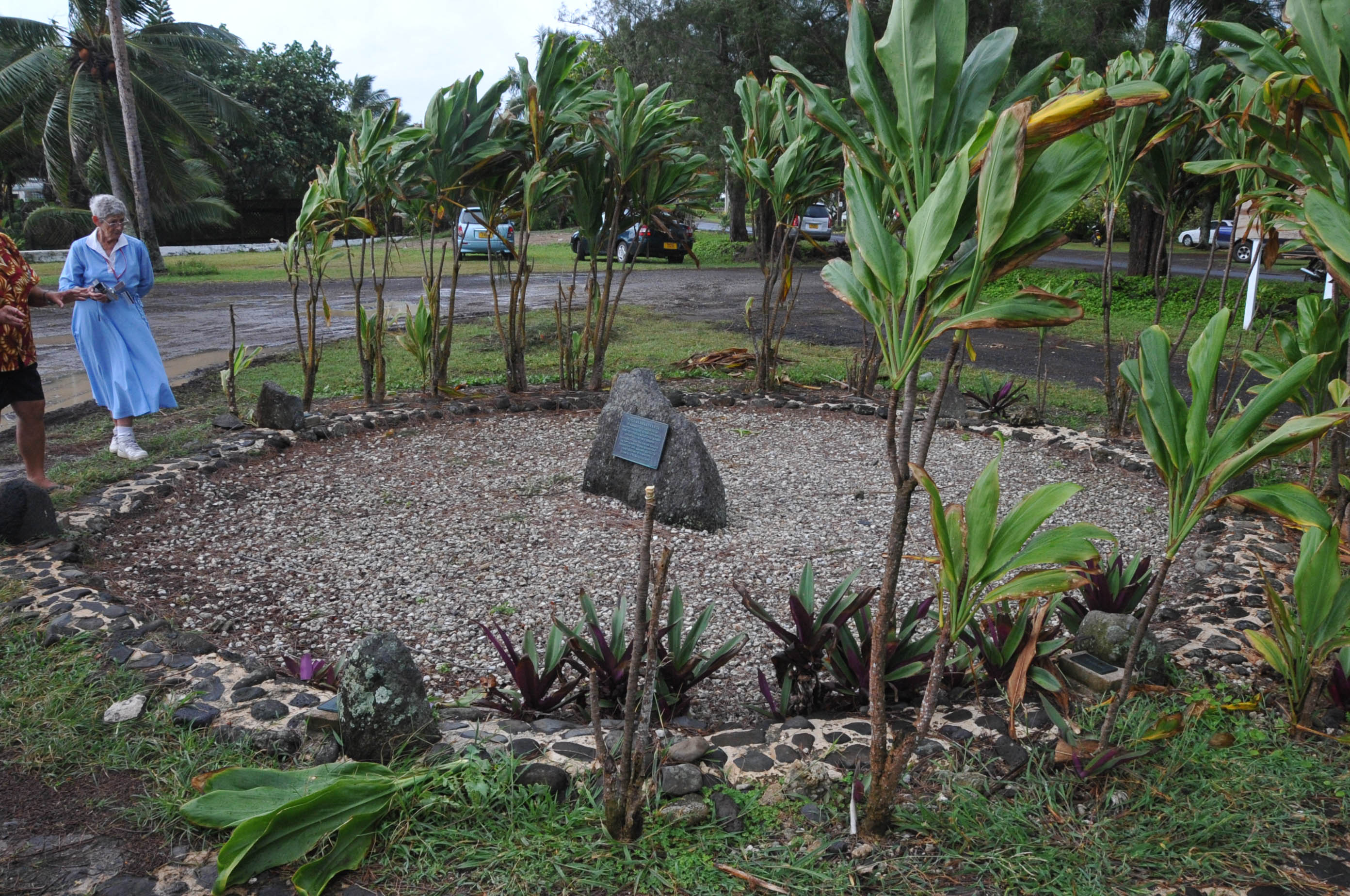
Circle of stones commemorates the Cook Islanders who colonised New Zealand
