= List of museums in the Cook Islands =

Museums in the Cook Islands include:

- Cook Islands National Museum
- Te Ara - Museum of Cultural Enterprise
- Cook Islands Library & Museum
- Pa Ariki's Takitumu Palace Museum
- Bergman Gallery
