= Te Ara - Museum of Cultural Enterprise =

Museum in Muri, Cook Islands

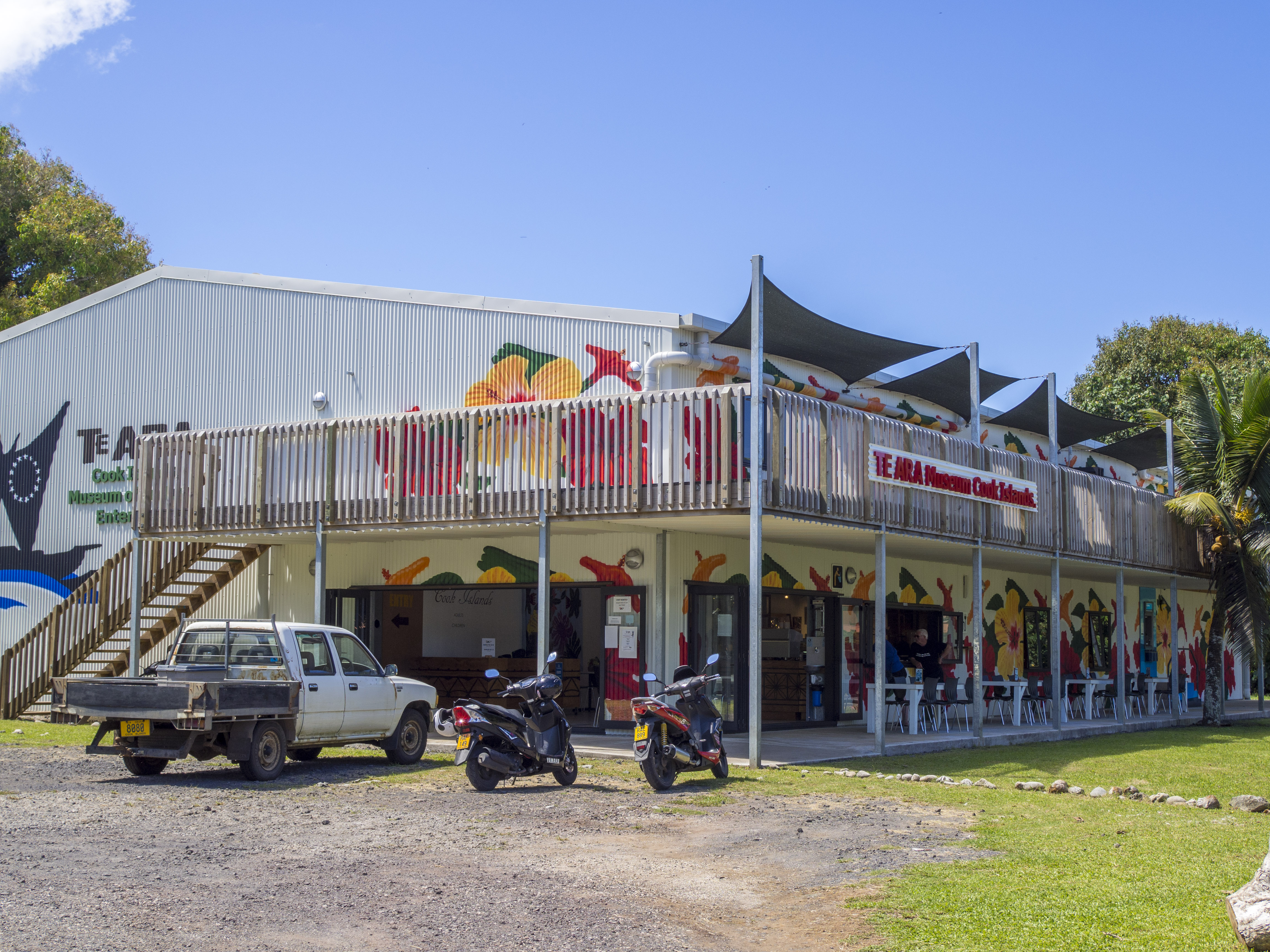
- Museum building
- Established: 2017
- Location: Muri Beach, Ngatangiia District, Rarotonga, Cook Islands, P7R8+8G6
- Coordinates: 21°15′33″S 159°44′1″W
- Type: Community museum, community-driven development
- Founders: Stan Wolfgramm & Julie Smith
- Website: tearacimce.com

Te Ara - Museum of Cultural Enterprise is a museum in Muri in the Ngatangiia District on Rarotonga in the Cook Islands.

The museum was established in February 2017 by Julie Smith and Stan Wolfgramm. It aims to display the history of the Cook Islands as well as acting as an incubator for local cultural businesses.
