= Avatiu =

Coordinates: 21°12′S 159°47′W

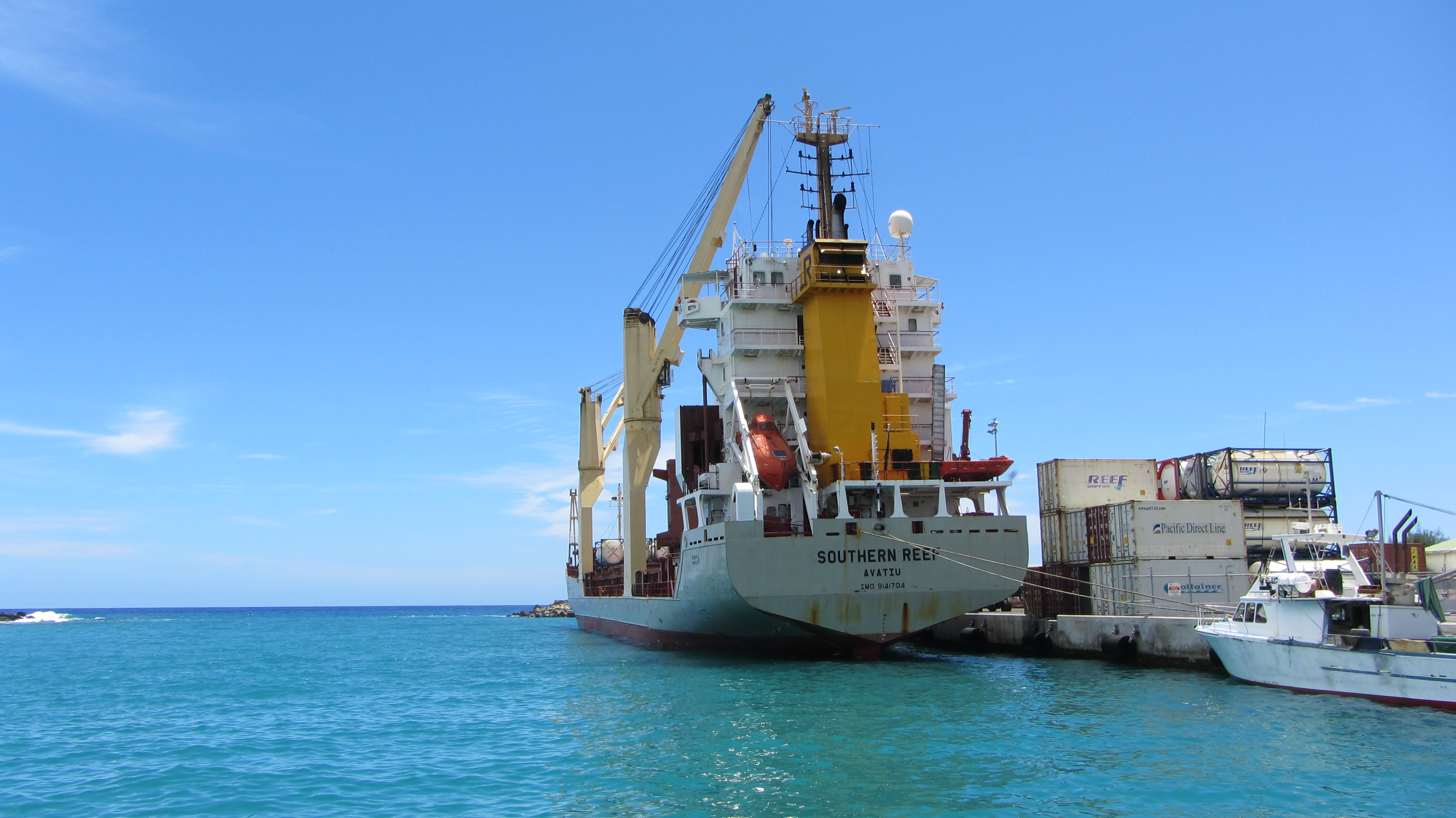
Avatiu Port

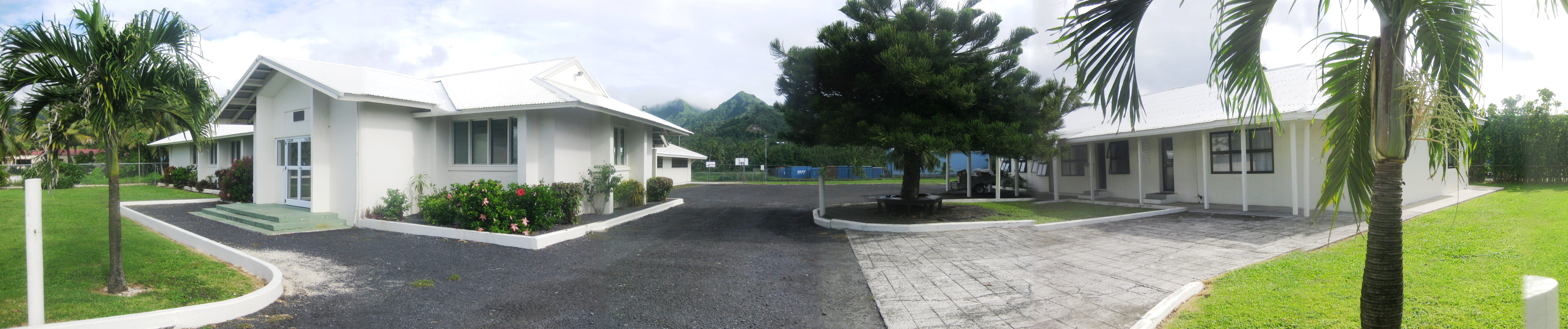
Mormon church and family history library in Avatiu

Avatiu is a settlement in the Avarua district on the north coast of Rarotonga in the Cook Islands, immediately west of Avarua township. Avatiu Stream flows through it. Avatiu Harbour is the location of Rarotonga's main port and a fishing port.

Buildings include a Cook Islands Trading Company (CITC) supermarket, which is the biggest supermarket on Rarotonga, and a Mormon church and family history centre. The settlement's sports ground is known as "The Swamp" after the adjacent Avatiu Swamp.
