= Avatiu Stream =

- Location of mouth

Location
- Country: Cook Islands

Physical characteristics
- Source
  - coordinates: 21°13′45.55″S 159°47′57.04″W
- Mouth
  - coordinates: 21°12′14.06″S 159°46′55.61″W
  - elevation: 0 m (0 ft)
- Length: 4.85 km (3.01 mi)

The Avatiu Stream is the largest watercourse on Rarotonga. It rises in the central mountains beneath Te Rua Manga and flows north to the sea at Avatiu. The stream flows at a constant grade of 4.5% and has a length of 4.85 km (3.01 mi).

In 2018 a heavy downpour caused the stream to overflow its banks and flood businesses in Avatiu. In July 2020 the stream dried up due to low rainfall.
