= Ikurangi =

Mountain in the Cook Islands

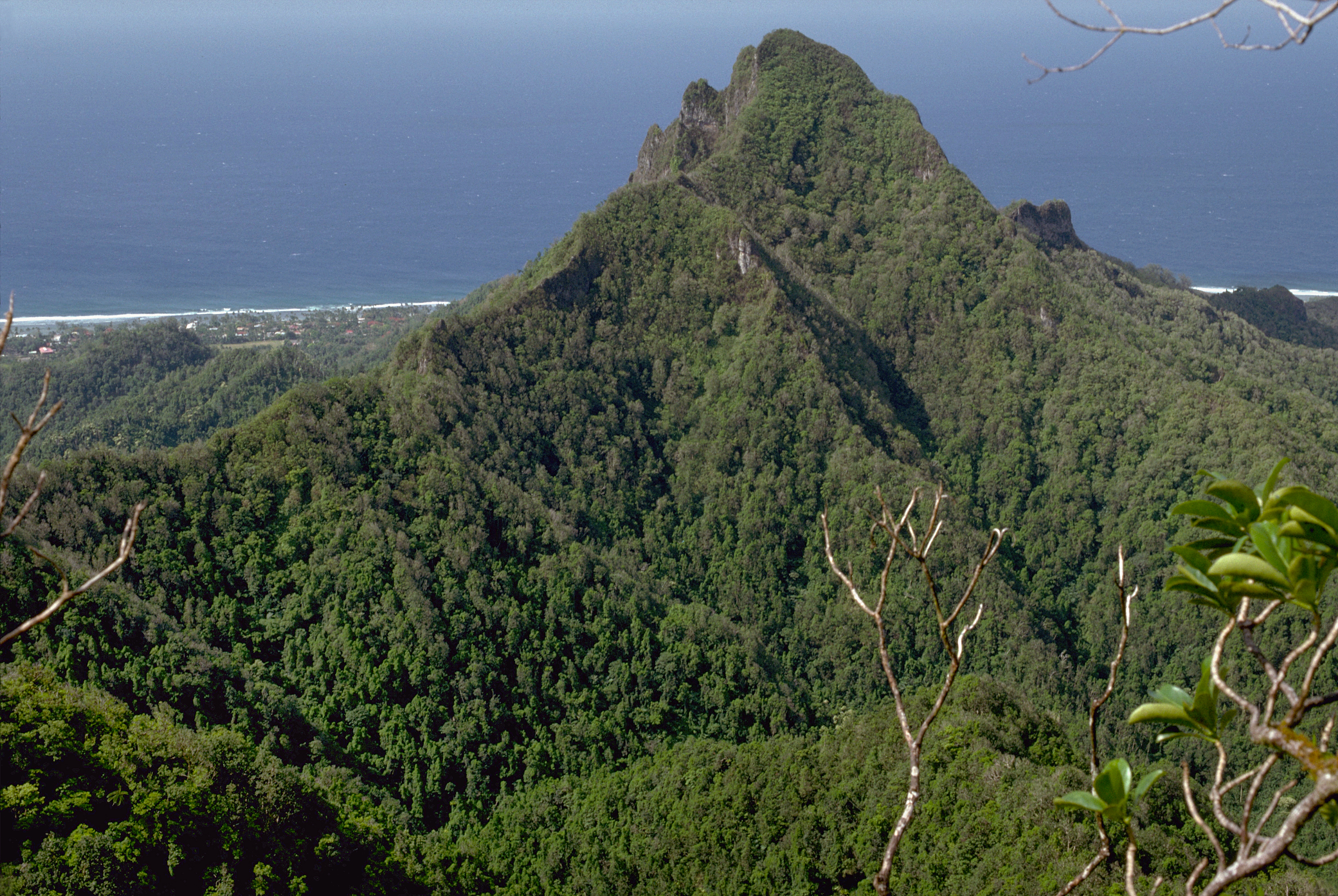
- Ikurangi Peak viewed from the route up Te Manga.

Highest point
- Elevation: 485 m (1,591 ft)
- Prominence: 165 m (541 ft)
- Coordinates: 21°13′17.47″S 159°45′45.61″W

Geography
- Location within Oceania
- Location: Rarotonga, Cook Islands

Ikurangi is one of the four major peaks of Rarotonga in the Cook Islands. It has an elevation of 485 metres above sea level and overlooks the capital Avarua and the village of Matavera. The peak is climbable by a hiking trail. Its name is derived from a mountain in Tahiti and in turn is remembered by Mount Hikurangi in New Zealand.

== See also ==
- List of mountains in the Cook Islands
