= Muri Lagoon =

Lagoon in the Cook Islands

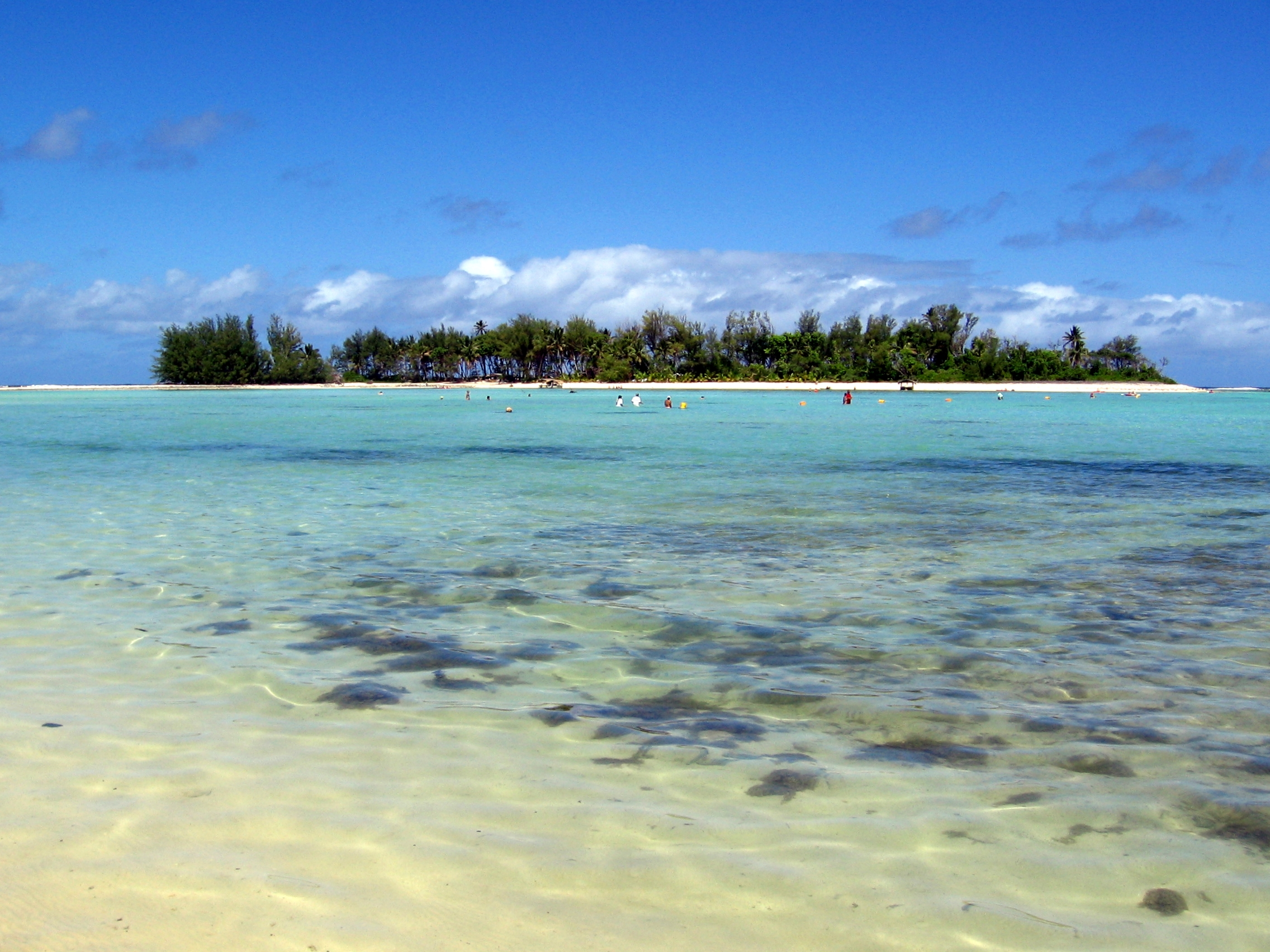
- Muri Lagoon from Muri Beach

- Location of Muri Lagoon in the Cook Islands
- Location: Rarotonga
- Coordinates: 21°15′30″S 159°43′45″W

Muri Lagoon is in the Ngatangiia district on the eastern coast of Rarotonga in the Cook Islands. The lagoon is a significant tourist attraction and the largest tourism revenue earner in the Cook Islands, accounting for 25% of tourism bed usage on Rarotonga. In 2015 the Cook Islands government declared the environmental condition of the lagoon a national disaster.

== Geography ==
The lagoon is approximately 1 kilometre (0.62 mi) wide and has a maximum depth of 1.25 metres (4.1 ft). It is bounded on the north by Ngatangiia Harbour, and on the south by the motu of Taakoka. It contains three small islets or motu. From north to south, the islets are:

1. Motutapu, 10.5 hectares (0.041 sq mi)
2. Oneroa, 8.1 hectares (0.031 sq mi)
3. Koromiri, 2.9 hectares (0.011 sq mi)

The islet of Taakoka (1.3 hectares (0.0050 sq mi)) forms the southern boundary of lagoon.

The Avana and Turangi streams flow into the lagoon. Water circulation is driven by waves breaking across the reef, with outflow through Ngatangiia Harbour.

== Pollution ==
The lagoon is heavily polluted, with nitrogen from agricultural runoff and leaking septic tanks leading to growth of noxious seaweed and decreased water visibility. In 2015 the Cook Islands government declared the environmental condition of the lagoon a national disaster. In 2016 the Cook Islands Chamber of Commerce began a program to scrape algae from the bottom of the lagoon. In 2019 the government proposed a centrally-operated wastewater system to reduce the supply of nutrients. In December 2020 the lagoon suffered an anoxic event, and local residents were warned to avoid swimming or harvesting seafood from the area.
