= Motutapu (Tonga) =

Islet near Tongatapu, Tonga

Coordinates: 21°05′30″S 175°03′25″W

Motutapu (also spelt Motu Tapu) is an island in Tonga, off the coast of Tongatapu.
