= Te Rua Manga =

Mountain in the Cook Islands

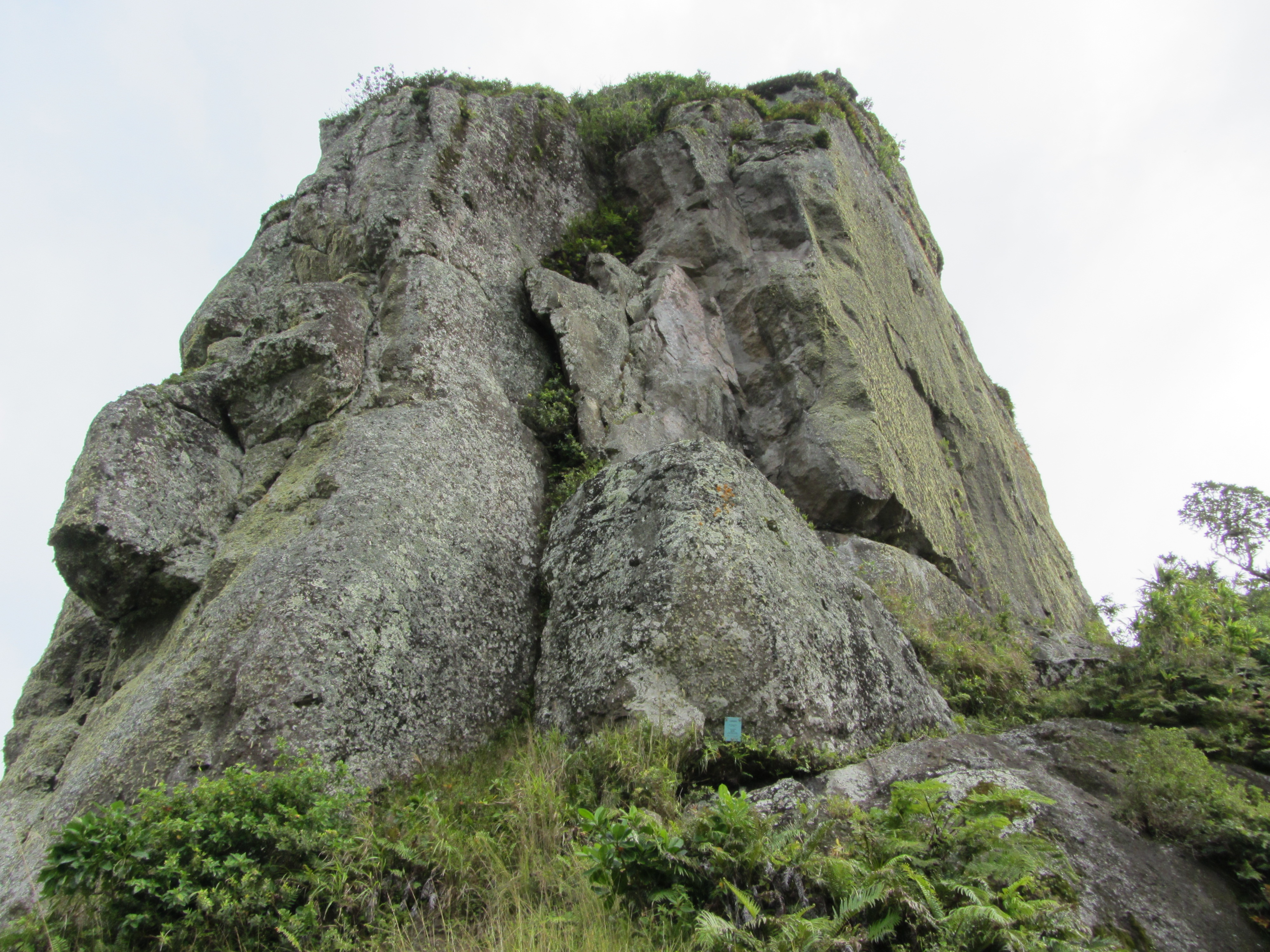
- Te Rua Manga or the Needle, a breccia structure

Highest point
- Elevation: 413 m (1,355 ft)
- Prominence: 93 m (305 ft)
- Coordinates: 21°14′21″S 159°47′20″W

Geography
- Location within Oceania
- Location: Rarotonga, Cook Islands

Te Rua Manga or the Needle is a mountain peak on Rarotonga in the Cook Islands. It has an elevation of 413 metres above sea level. The spire itself is a breccia structure.

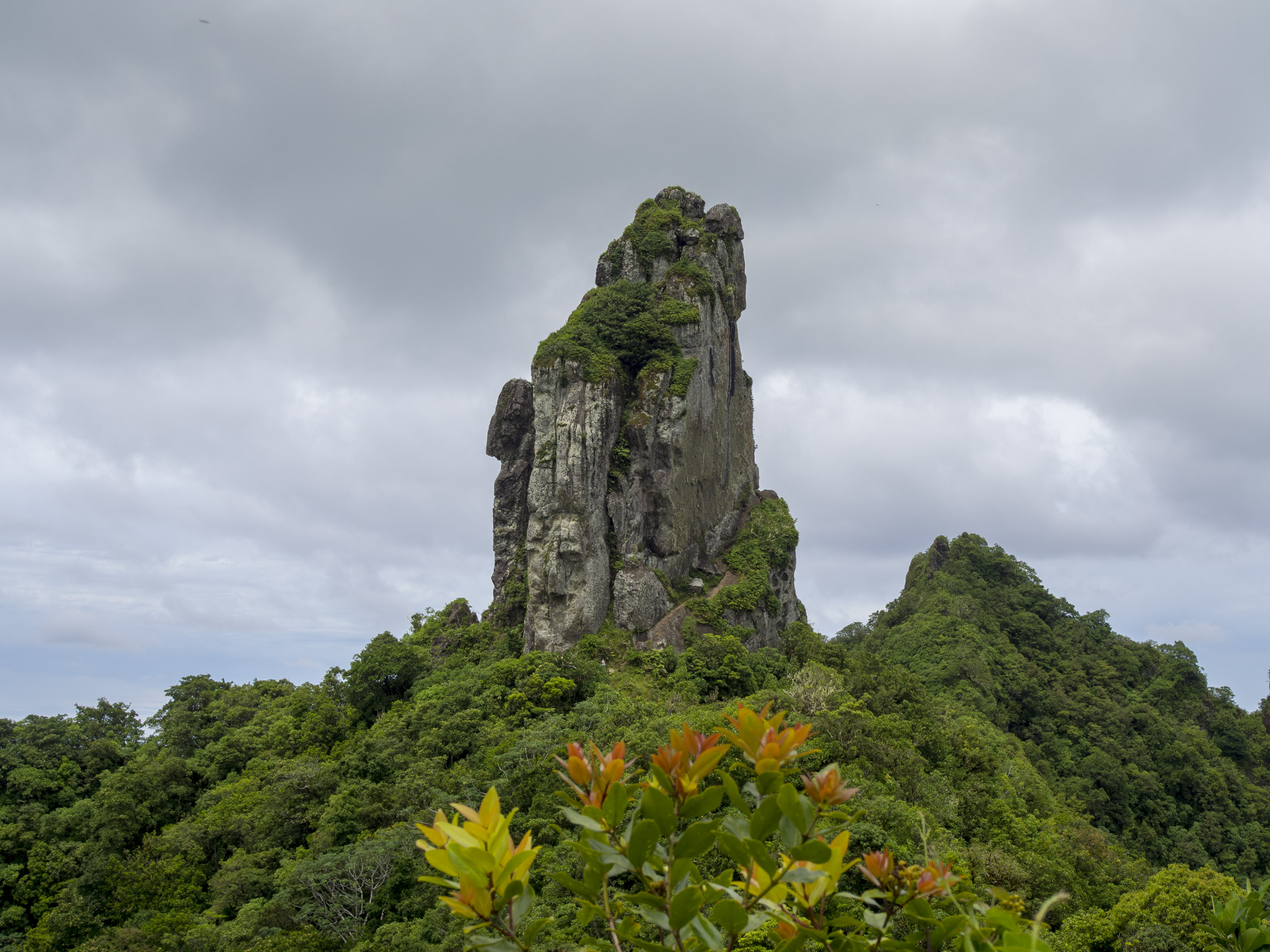
Te Rua Manga or the Needle

The Cross-Island Track runs from Avatiu valley in the north up to Te Rua Manga, then continues on to Wigmore Falls (Papua Falls) and the south coast. Hikers may walk up to the base of the spire and then retrace to their starting point, or may continue to complete the Cross-Island Track.

== See also ==
- List of mountains in the Cook Islands
