= Motutapu Island (Karikari Peninsula) =

Small island in New Zealand

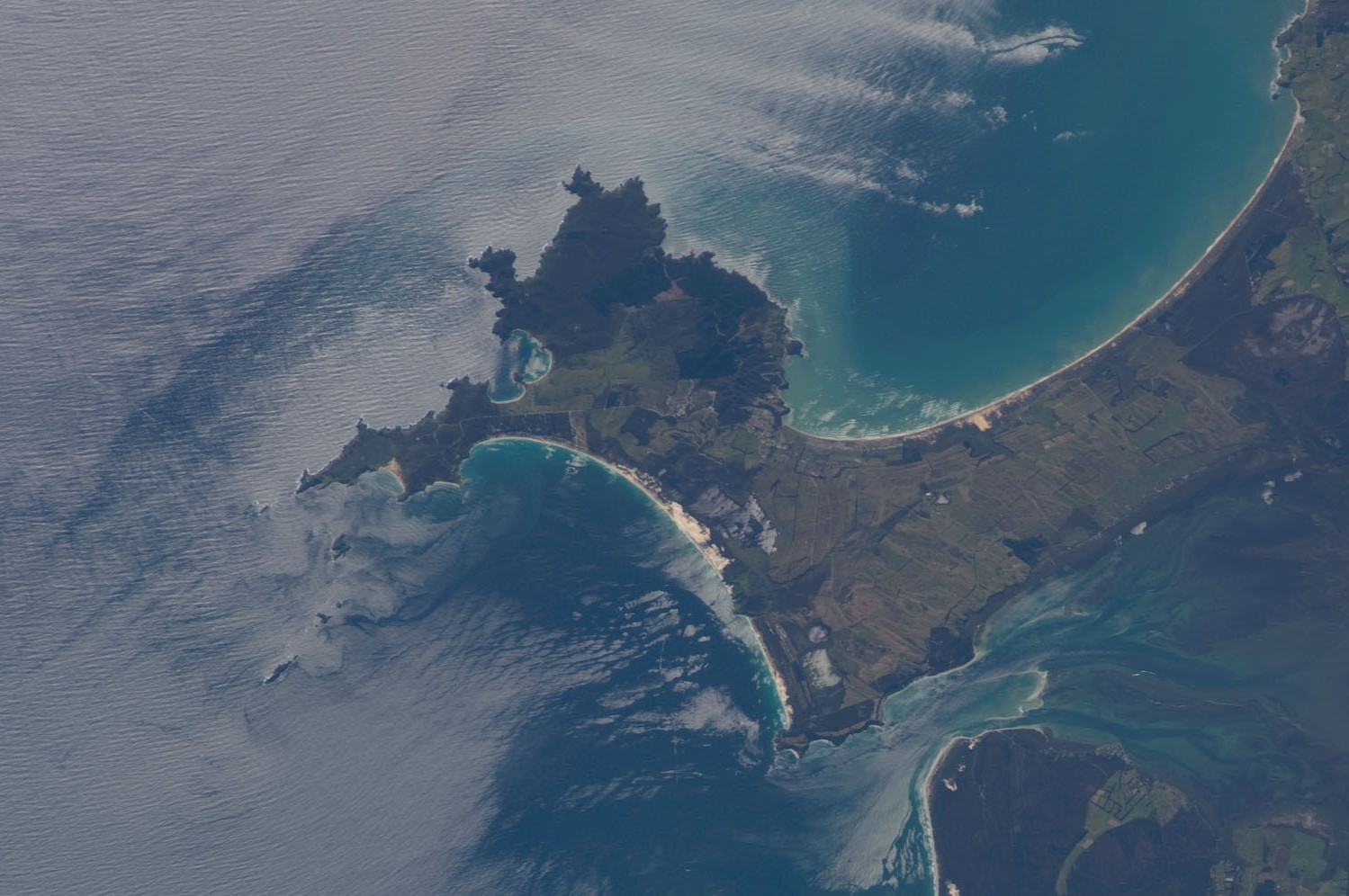
- View of the Karikari Peninsular with Motutapu Island taken during ISS Expedition 18.

- Location within Northland Region

Geography
- Location: Northland Region
- Coordinates: 34°46′52.5″S 173°21′31.6″E

Administration
- New Zealand

Motutapu Island, Far North, NZ

Motutapu Island is a small island in the Far North Region of Northland New Zealand. It is situated within the Moturoa Islands about 3.3 kilometres (2.1 mi) off the Karikari Peninsula.

It is about 72 kilometres (45 mi) northwest of Kerikeri and about 73 kilometres (45 mi) southeast of Cape Reinga.

== Etymology ==
In Māori, 'motu' means island and 'tapu' is something restricted, prohibited, set apart or sacred. Motutapu as a 'sacred' or 'sanctuary' island, is a term used for various islands in a number of Polynesian cultures.
