= Te Manga =

Highest point of the Cook Islands

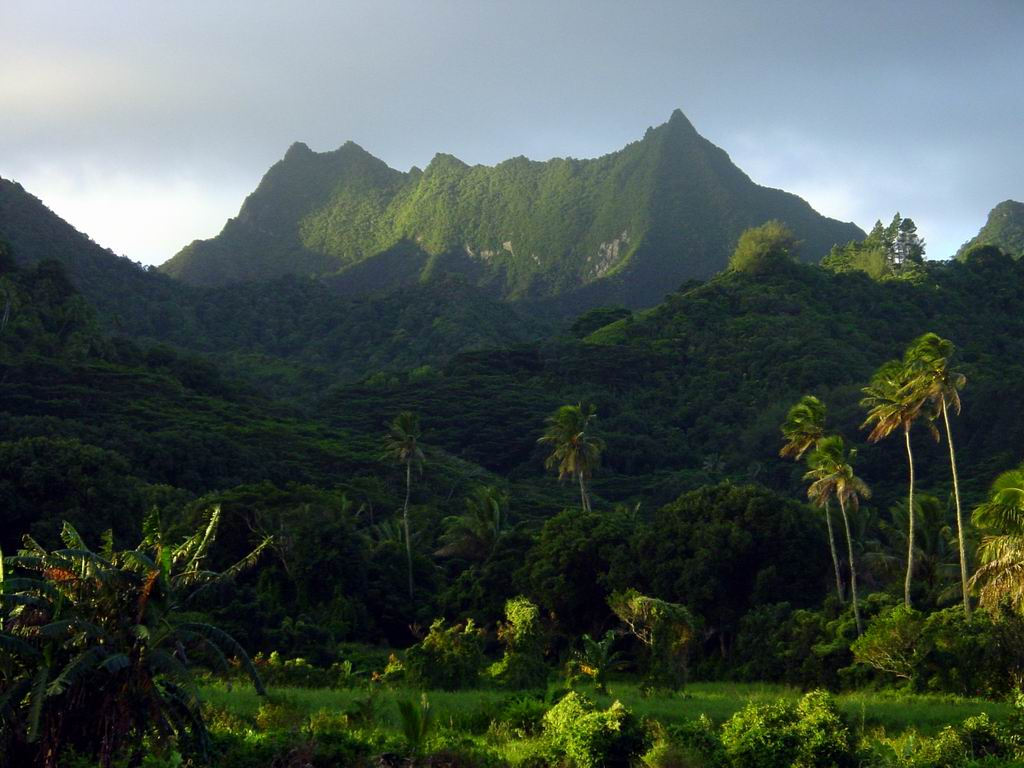
- Te Manga viewed from the south coast.

Highest point
- Elevation: 652 m (2,139 ft)
- Prominence: 652 m (2,139 ft)
- Coordinates: 21°13′42″S 159°45′2″W

Geography
- Location within Oceania
- Location: Rarotonga, Cook Islands

Te Manga is the highest point on Rarotonga with an elevation of 652 metres (2,139 ft) above sea level. The island is part of the Cook Islands, a self-governing parliamentary democracy in free association with New Zealand.

== See also ==
- List of mountains in the Cook Islands
