= Motutapu (Ua Huka) =

Small island in the Cook Islands

- Location within Marquesas Islands

Geography
- Location: Marquesas Islands
- Coordinates: 8°51′48.4″S 139°33′05.9″W

Administration
- Marquesas Islands

Motutapu is a small island north of Ua Huka, Marquesas Islands.

== Etymology ==
The name "Motutapu" means "Sacred island" in several Polynesian languages.
