= Motutapu (Cook Islands) =

Small island in the Cook Islands

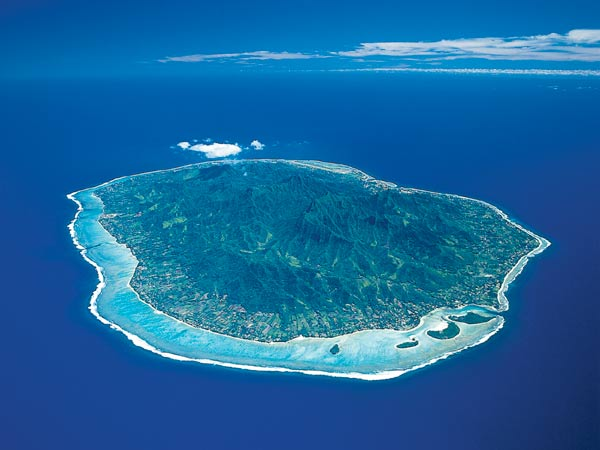
- Rarotonga with Motutapu on right

- Location within Cook Islands

Geography
- Location: Cook Islands
- Coordinates: 21°14′51.5″S 159°43′31.4″W
- Archipelago: Cook Islands
- Highest elevation: 12 m (39 ft)

Administration
- Cook Islands

Motutapu is a small island on the east side of Rarotonga island, within Rarotonga's coral reef, in the Cook Islands. To its north is the Avana Passage through the reef, and Ngatangiia Harbour. To its west is Muri Lagoon. Motutapu is about 100 metres (330 ft) off the main island, and has a maximum elevation of 12 metres.

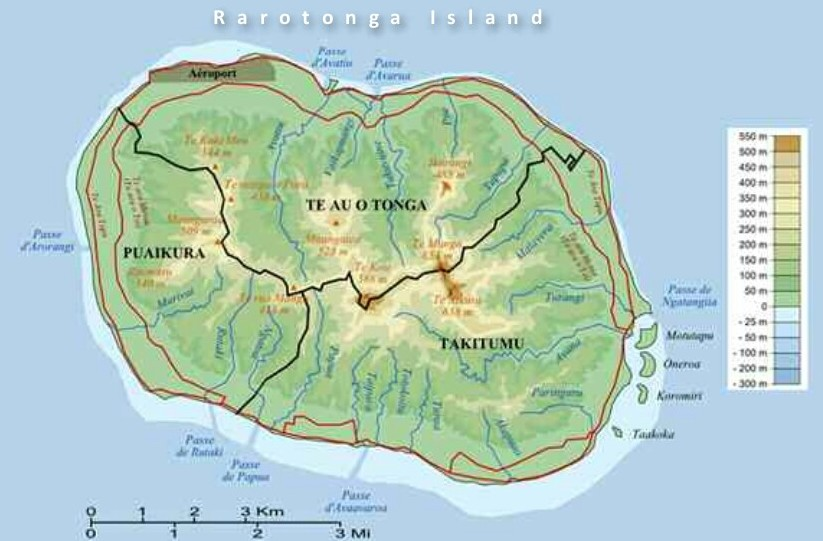
Map of Rarotonga island

== Etymology ==
The name "Motutapu" means "Sacred island" in several Polynesian languages.
