= Avarua =

Capital of the Cook Islands

- District and town
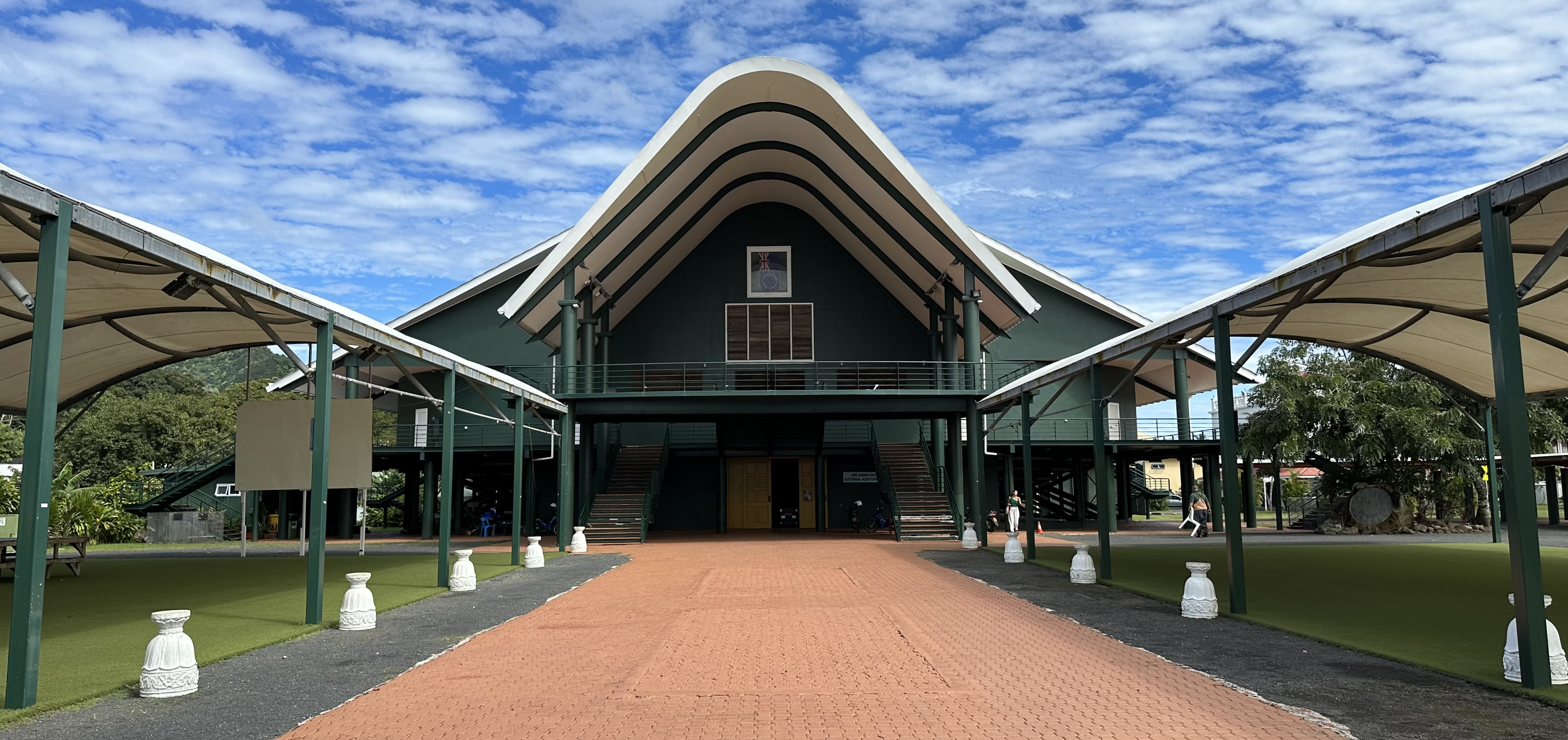
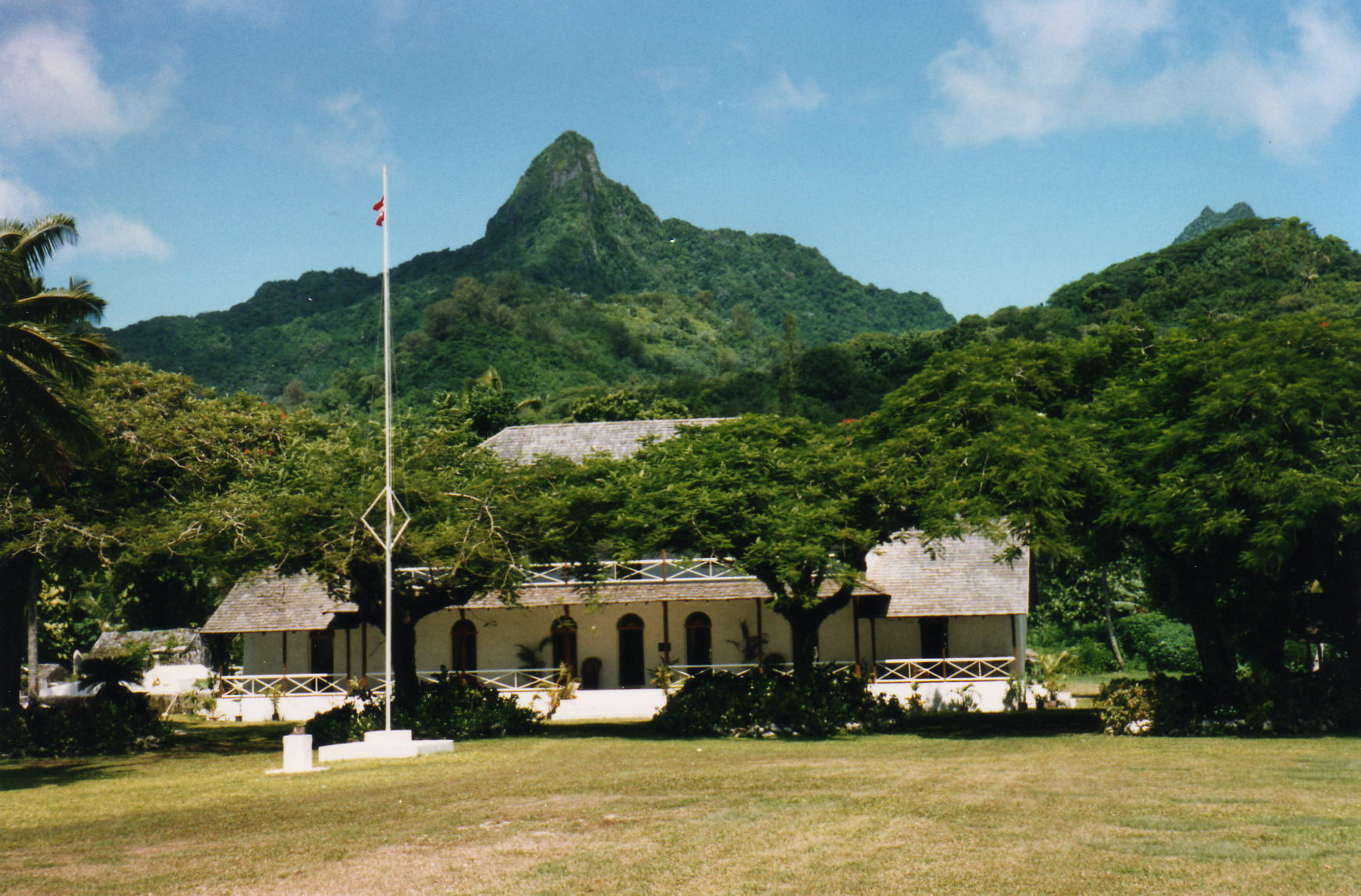
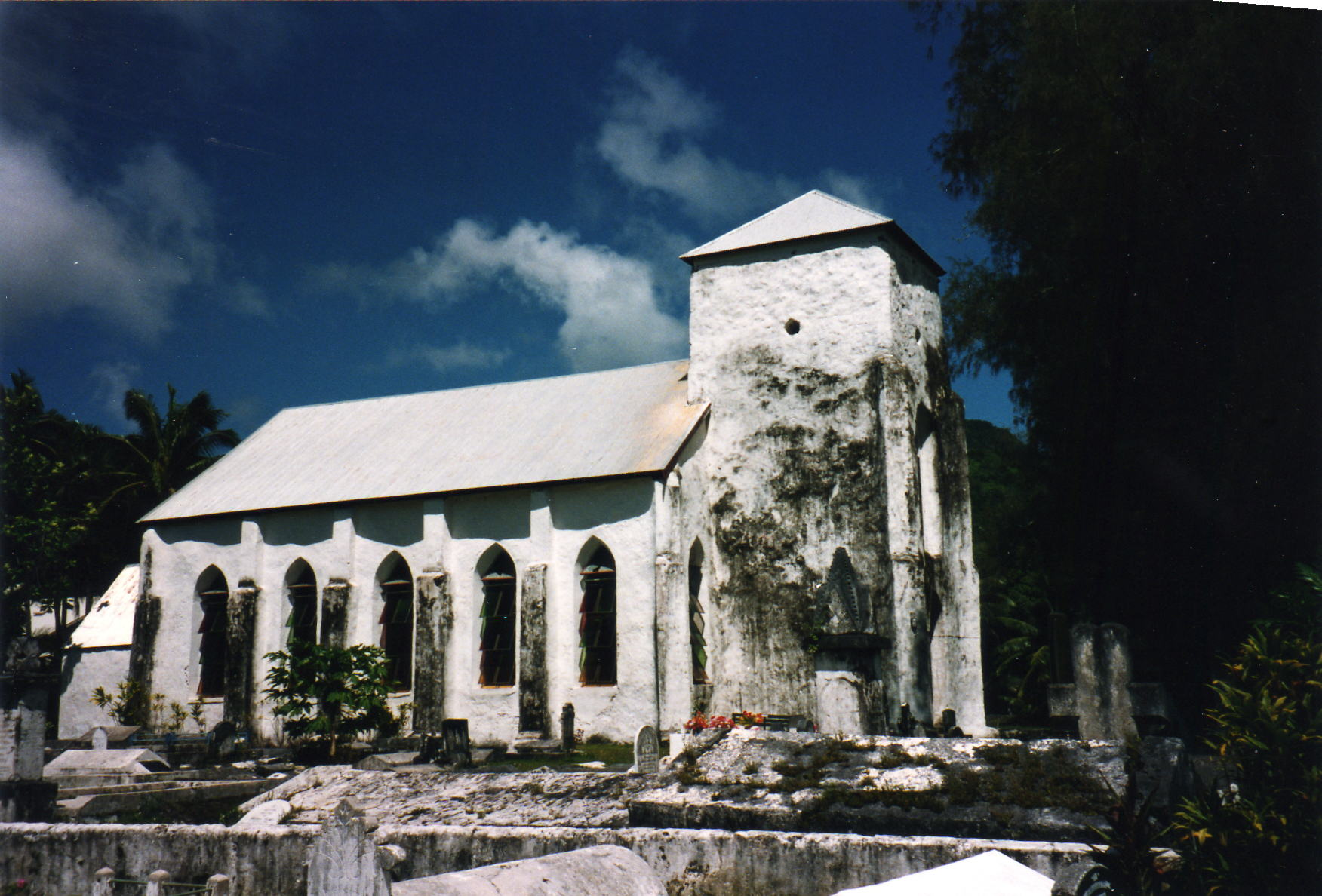
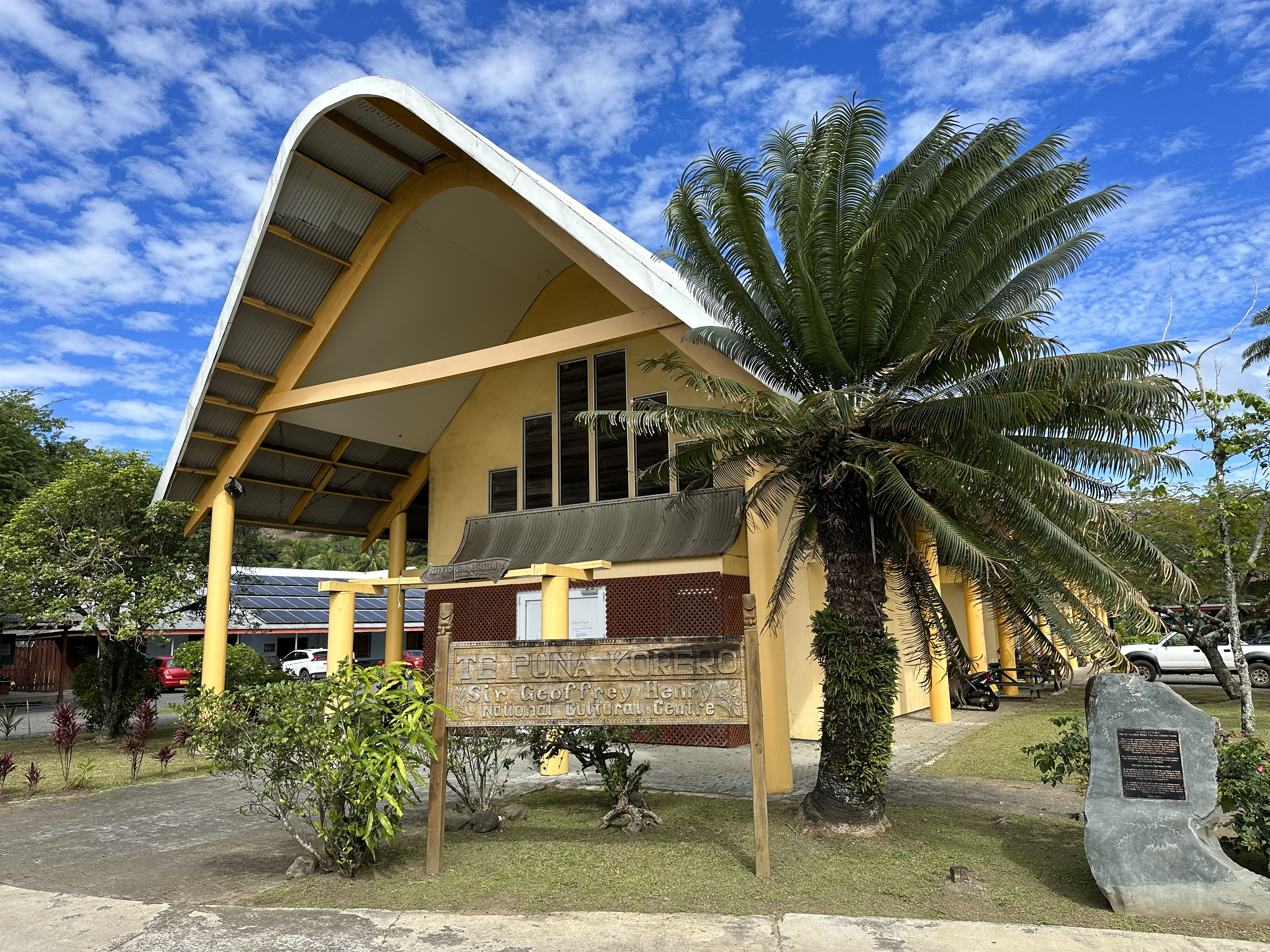
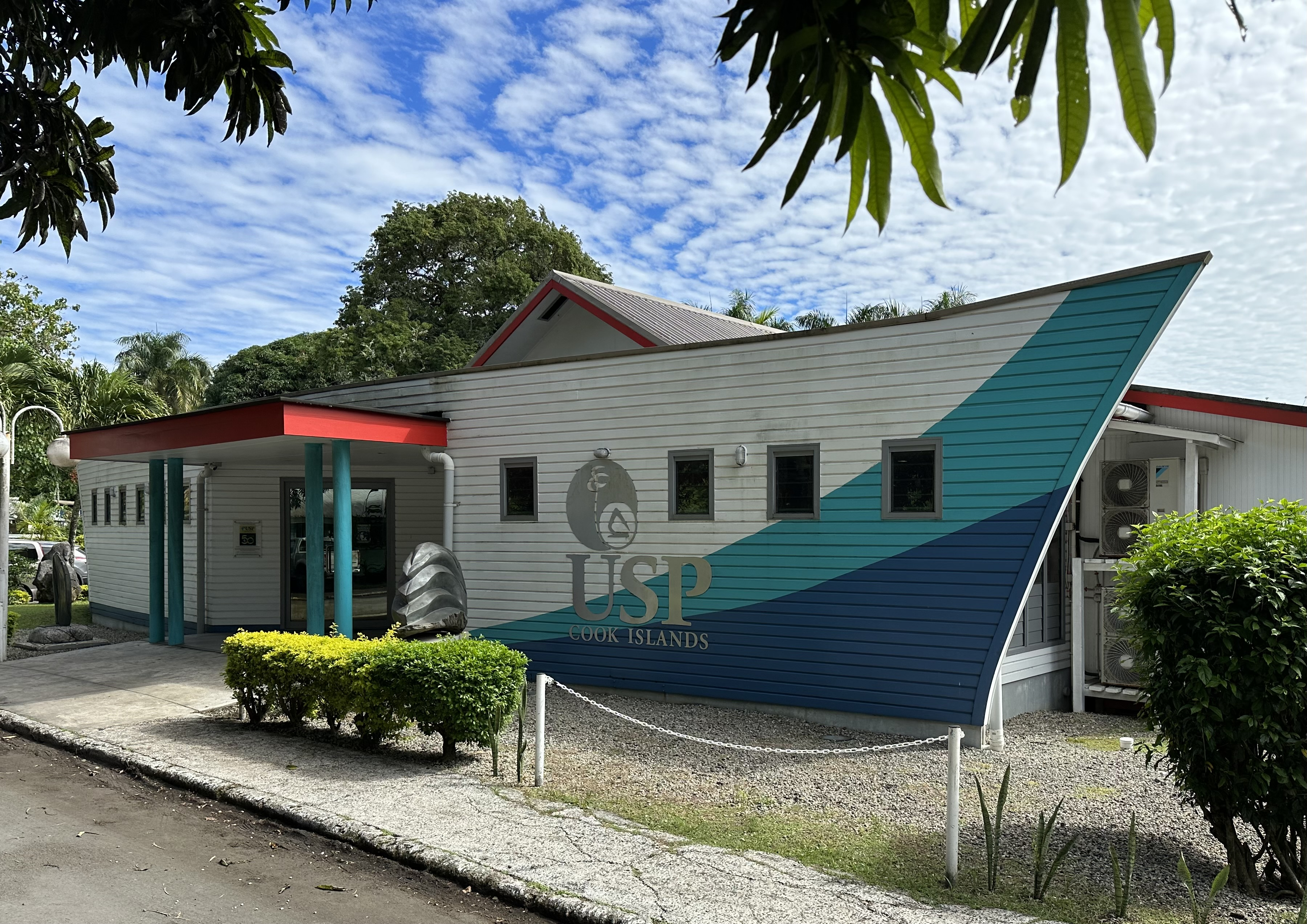
- Cook Islands National Auditorium Para O Tane Palace CICC Church Cook Islands National Museum University of the South Pacific

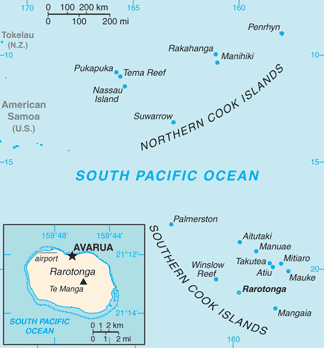
- Location of Avarua (starred)

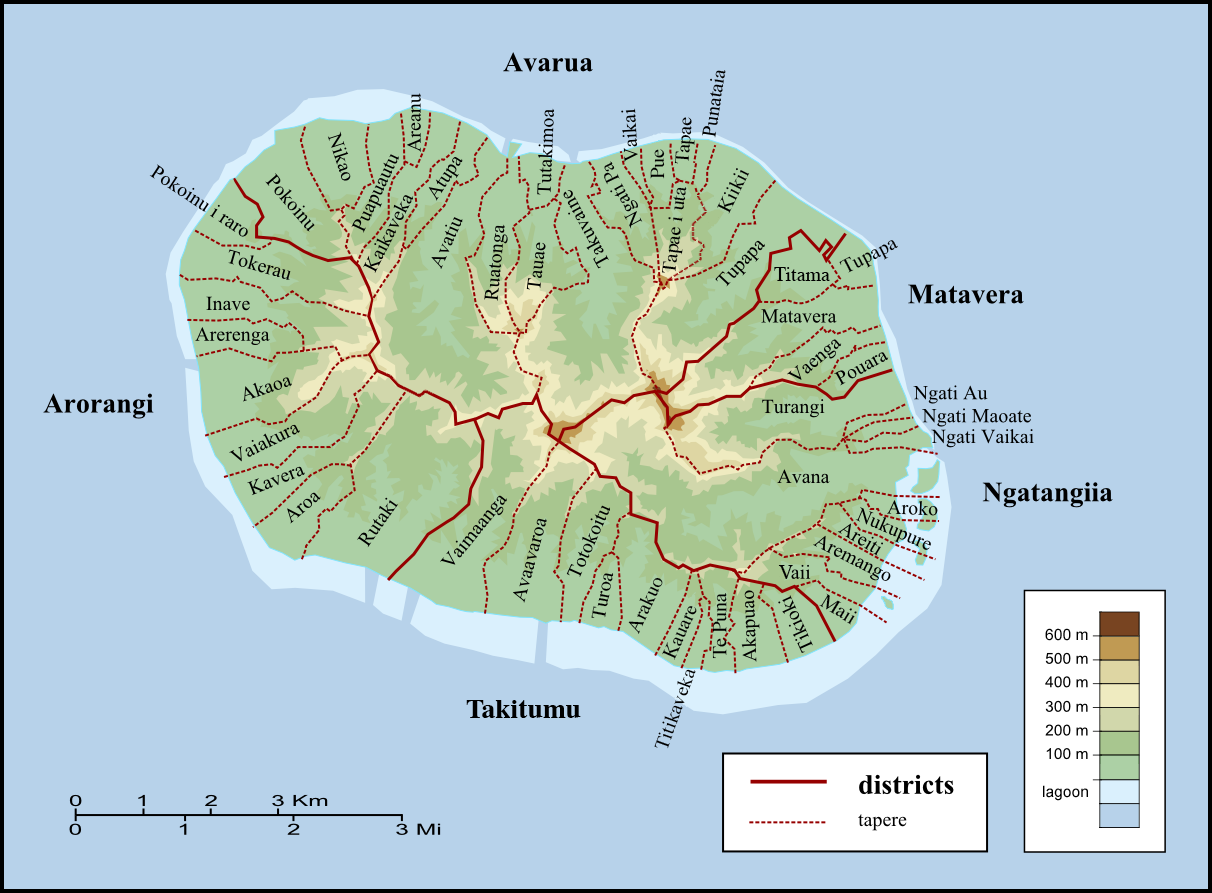
- Districts and tapere of Rarotonga
- Coordinates: 21°12′25″S 159°46′15″W
- Country: New Zealand
- Constituent country: Cook Islands
- Island: Rarotonga

Area
  - Total: 28 km^{2} (11 sq mi)

Population (2021)
  - Total: 5,120
- Time zone: UTC-10:00 (CKT)
- Area code: +682
- Climate: Af

Avarua (meaning "two harbours" in Māori) is a district and township in the north of the island of Rarotonga, the largest island of the Cook Islands. (Note: Cook Islands is self-governing state while in free association with New Zealand.) It serves as the capital of the country and is divided into 19 tapere (sub-districts). It is an important commercial and economic centre, with the country's main airport (Rarotonga International Airport) and harbour (Avatiu) here. The district had a population of 5,120 in the 2021 census.

== Geography ==
Avarua district is the northern part of Rarotonga, the largest island of the Cook Islands, and one of the island's five districts. It is subdivided into 19 tapere (traditional sub-districts), and is the administrative capital of the country.

Avarua township or central Avarua is the main central business district of Rarotonga and the location of government offices. It is built around two harbours (the name Avarua means "two harbours") – Avatiu Harbour, where the main port is, and Avarua Harbour at Takuvaine, which used to be the main port but is now a small fishing port. The township hosts the Sir Geoffrey Henry National Culture Centre, which includes the National Library (Runanga Puka) and the Cook Islands National Museum, and the Cook Islands Library & Museum.

== History ==
The Cook Islands were inhabited largely by indigenous Māori people till the late 19th century. Avarua was not the main centre of Rarotonga until missionaries of the London Missionary Society arrived in 1823 and set up their national headquarters there. Trading ships also based themselves there and from the middle of the 19th century it became the religious and commercial centre of the Cook Islands. The country became a British protectorate in 1888 and after the first British resident was appointed, Avarua became the administrative and educational centre of the islands. The Cook Islands became part of New Zealand in 1901. A Resident Commissioner governed until 1946, after which the Cook Islands began transitioning to self-governance. In 1965, the islands achieved self-governance and remained in free association with New Zealand with the external affairs and yearly grants controlled by New Zealand.

== Population ==
The 19 tapere are grouped into five census districts, as of 2021. The population of Avarua District was 5,120 in the 2021 census.

Census district (west to east)	Population (2021)
Nikao-Panama	1,489
Avatiu-Ruatonga-Atupa	975
Tutakimoa-Teotue	274
Takuvaine	629
Kiikii-Tupapa-Maraerenga	1,753
Total	5,120

== Transportation ==
Rarotonga International Airport in Avarua provides air links to New Zealand and Australia. It is connected via Ara Tapu, a coastal ring road encircling the island, and the inner Ara Metua, built in the 11th century, skirting the interior. Public buses traverse the ring road, both in clockwise and anti-clockwise directions. Avatiu Port is the main commercial port; cruise ships anchor outside the harbour.

== Climate ==
Avarua has a tropical rainforest climate (Af) according to the Köppen climate classification with high temperatures and rainfall throughout the year. Although there are no true wet or dry seasons, there is a noticeably wetter stretch from December to April.

Climate data for Avarua
Month	Jan	Feb	Mar	Apr	May	Jun	Jul	Aug	Sep	Oct	Nov	Dec	Year
Mean daily maximum °C (°F)	28.8 (83.8)	29.1 (84.4)	29.1 (84.4)	28.3 (82.9)	26.4 (79.5)	25.3 (77.5)	24.6 (76.3)	24.9 (76.8)	25.6 (78.1)	26.3 (79.3)	27.2 (81.0)	28.0 (82.4)	27.0 (80.5)
Daily mean °C (°F)	25.9 (78.6)	26.2 (79.2)	26.2 (79.2)	25.4 (77.7)	23.7 (74.7)	22.7 (72.9)	22.0 (71.6)	22.3 (72.1)	22.7 (72.9)	23.5 (74.3)	24.4 (75.9)	25.2 (77.4)	24.2 (75.5)
Mean daily minimum °C (°F)	23.1 (73.6)	23.4 (74.1)	23.3 (73.9)	22.5 (72.5)	21.0 (69.8)	20.1 (68.2)	19.4 (66.9)	19.7 (67.5)	19.9 (67.8)	20.7 (69.3)	21.7 (71.1)	22.4 (72.3)	21.4 (70.6)
Average rainfall mm (inches)	256 (10.1)	229 (9.0)	219 (8.6)	246 (9.7)	199 (7.8)	128 (5.0)	112 (4.4)	141 (5.6)	138 (5.4)	121 (4.8)	171 (6.7)	246 (9.7)	2,206 (86.8)
Source: Climate-Data.org

== Sister cities ==
On 7 June 2024, Prime Minister Mark Brown of the Cook Islands and Tou Travel Ariki, President of the House of Ariki, signed a sister city agreement between Avarua and Honolulu, Hawaii.
