= Rarotonga =

Island of the Cook Islands

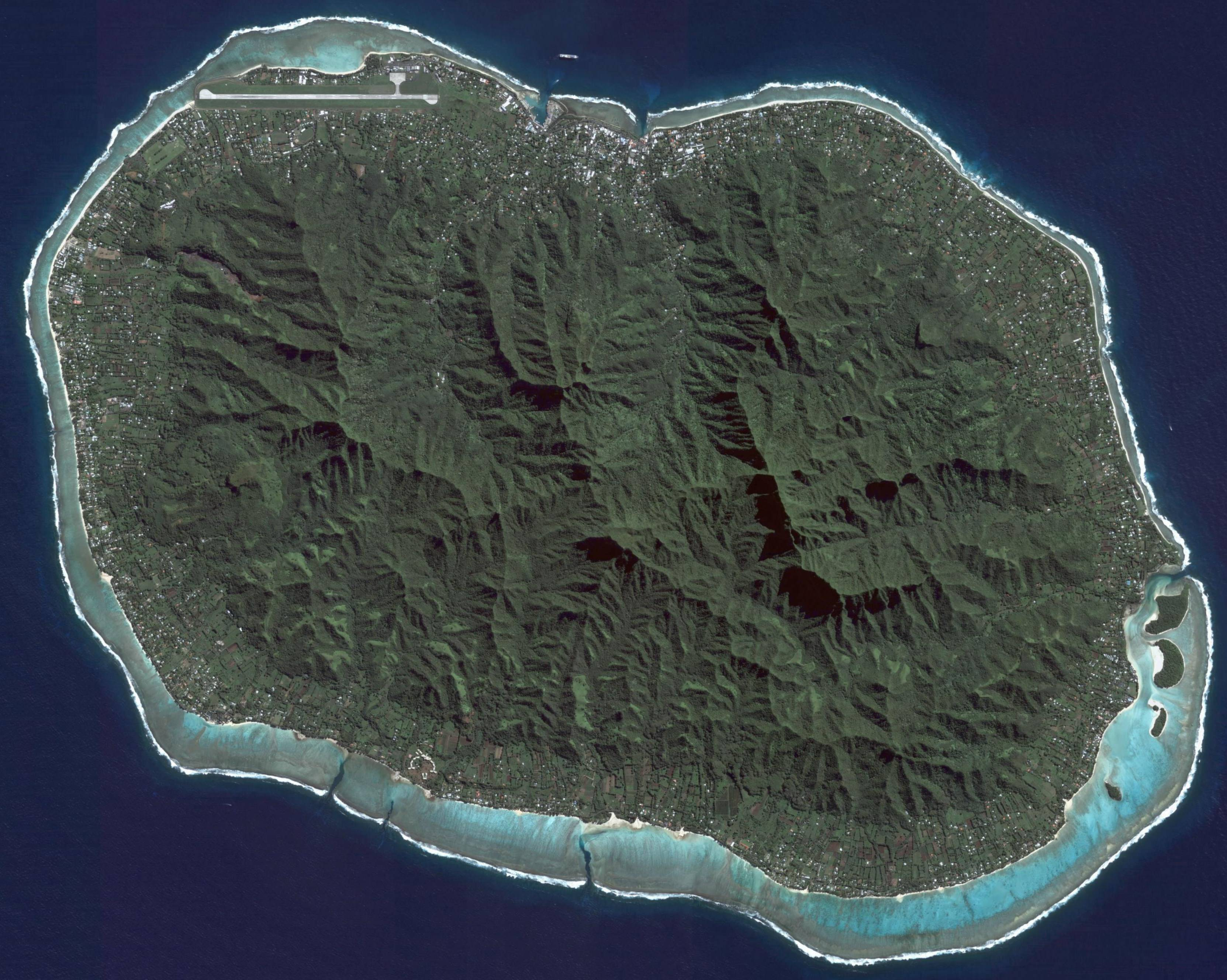
- NASA satellite image of Rarotonga

- Location within Cook Islands Location within Oceania Location within Pacific Ocean

Geography
- Location: Central-Southern Pacific Ocean
- Coordinates: 21°14′6″S 159°46′41″W
- Archipelago: Cook Islands
- Area: 67.39 km^{2} (26.02 sq mi)
- Highest elevation: 652 m (2139 ft)
- Highest point: Te Manga

Administration
- Cook Islands
- Largest settlement: Avarua (pop. 5,120)

Demographics
- Demonym: Rarotongan
- Population: 10,898 (2021)
- Pop. density: 162/km^{2} (420/sq mi)
- Ethnic groups: Cook Islanders

Rarotonga (sometimes abbreviated Raro) is the largest and most populous island of the country of the Cook Islands. The island is volcanic, with an area of 67.39 km^{2} (26.02 sq mi), and is home to 72% of the country's population, with 10,898 of a total population of 15,040. Avarua, on the north coast, is the location of the Parliament buildings and the capital of the Cook Islands. The country's international airport is also in Avarua, and Rarotonga is a popular tourist destination, with many resorts, hotels and motels.

Rarotonga has been populated by a Polynesian people since late in the 1st millennium. Although it had been sighted earlier, Captain Theodore Walker master of the colonial schooner Cumberland is credited as the first European to land on the island in 1814.

== Geography ==
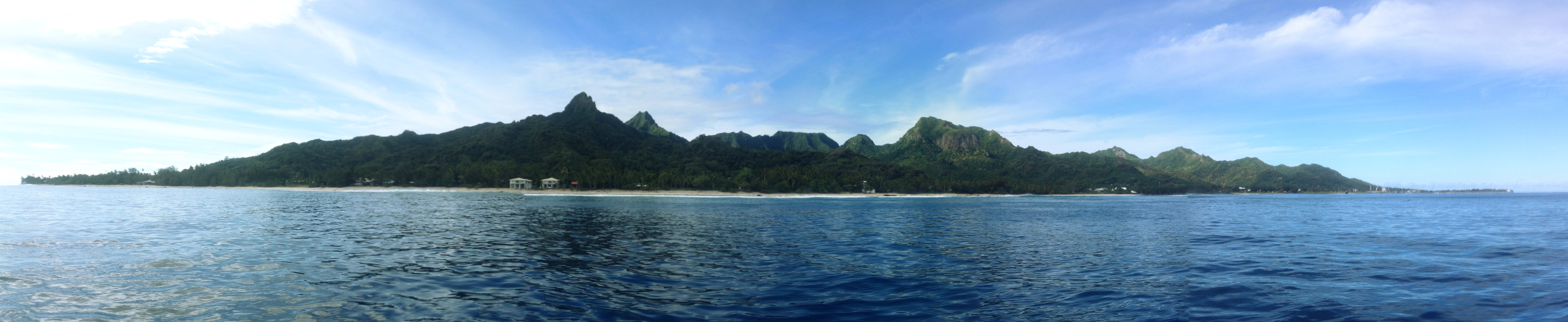
Rarotonga viewed from the north

Rarotonga is a kidney-shaped volcanic island, 32 km (20 mi) in circumference, and 11.2 km (7.0 mi) wide on its longest (east-west) axis. The island is the summit of an extinct Pliocene or Pleistocene volcano, which rises 5,000 metres (16,000 feet) from the seafloor. The island was formed between 2.3 and 1.6 million years ago, with a later stage of volcanism between 1.4 and 1.1 million years ago. While its position is consistent with being formed by the Macdonald hotspot, its age is too young, and its formation is attributed to a short-lived Rarotonga hotspot, or to rejuvenated volcanism at Aitutaki.

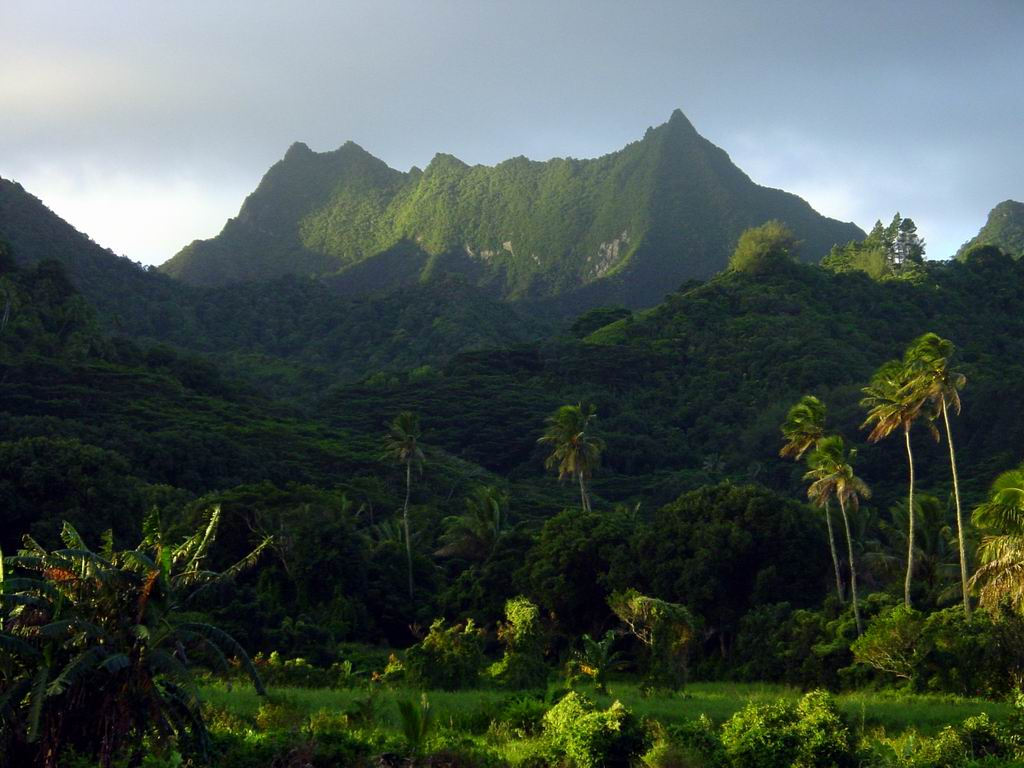
Te Manga is the highest mountain in the Cook Islands.

The core of the island consists of densely forested hills cut by deep valleys, the eroded remnants of the original volcanic cone. Te Manga, at 658 m (2,140 ft) above sea level, is the highest peak on the island. Ikurangi, a smaller peak, overlooks the capital. The hills are drained by a number of radial streams, including the Avatiu Stream and Takuvaine Stream. Paved and unpaved roads allow access to valleys, but the interior of the island remains largely unpopulated due to forbidding terrain and lack of infrastructure.

The hills are surrounded by a low coastal plain consisting of beaches, a storm ridge, lowland swamps, and alluvial deposits. This in turn is surrounded by a fringing reef, which ranges from 30 to 900 metres (98 to 2,953 feet) wide. The reef is shallow, with a maximum depth of 1.5 m (4.9 ft), and has a number of passages, notably at Avarua, Avatiu and Ngatangiia. Beyond the reef crest, the outer reef slopes steeply to deep water.

The lagoon is at its widest off the southeast coast in the area of the Muri Lagoon. This area contains four small islets or motu. From north to south, the islets are:

1. Motutapu, 10.5 hectares (26 acres)
2. Oneroa, 8.1 hectares (20 acres)
3. Koromiri, 2.9 hectares (7.2 acres)
4. Taakoka, 1.3 hectares (3.2 acres)

Another small islet, Motutoa, lies on the reef flat on the northwest coast.

A tract of 155 ha (380 acres) of land has been set aside in the south-east as the Takitumu Conservation Area to protect native birds and plants, especially the Vulnerable kakerori (Rarotonga monarch or Rarotonga flycatcher). Other threatened birds in the conservation area include the Rarotonga fruit dove and Rarotonga starling. The site has been recognised as an Important Bird Area (IBA) by BirdLife International.

== History ==
The earliest evidence of human presence in the Southern Cook Islands has been dated to around AD 1000. Oral tradition tells that Rarotonga was settled by various groups, including Ata-i-te-kura, Apopo-te-akatinatina and Apopo-te-ivi-roa in the ninth century, and Tangi'ia Nui from Tahiti and Karika from Samoa in 1250. An early ariki, Toi, is said to have built Te Ara Nui o Toi or Ara Metua, a paved road that encircles the island, though the sites adjacent to it are dated to 1530. Trading contact was maintained with the Austral Islands, Samoa and the Marquesas to import basalt that was used for making local adze heads, while a pottery fragment found on Ma'uke has been traced to Tongatapu to the west, the main island of Tonga. The ultimate origin of almost all the islanders’ settlement cargo can be traced back to Southeast Asia: not just their chickens, Pacific rats, Polynesian pigs, Pacific dogs and crops, but also several kinds of lizards and snails. Among the species that are understood to have reached Rarotonga by this means are at least two species of geckos and three of skinks. Likewise, the ultimate origin of almost 30 of their crops lies in the west.

According to New Zealand Māori tradition, Kupe, the discoverer of Aotearoa, visited Rarotonga, and the Māori migration canoes Tākitimu, Te Arawa, Tainui, Mātaatua, Tokomaru, Aotea, and Kurahaupō passed through on their way to Aotearoa.

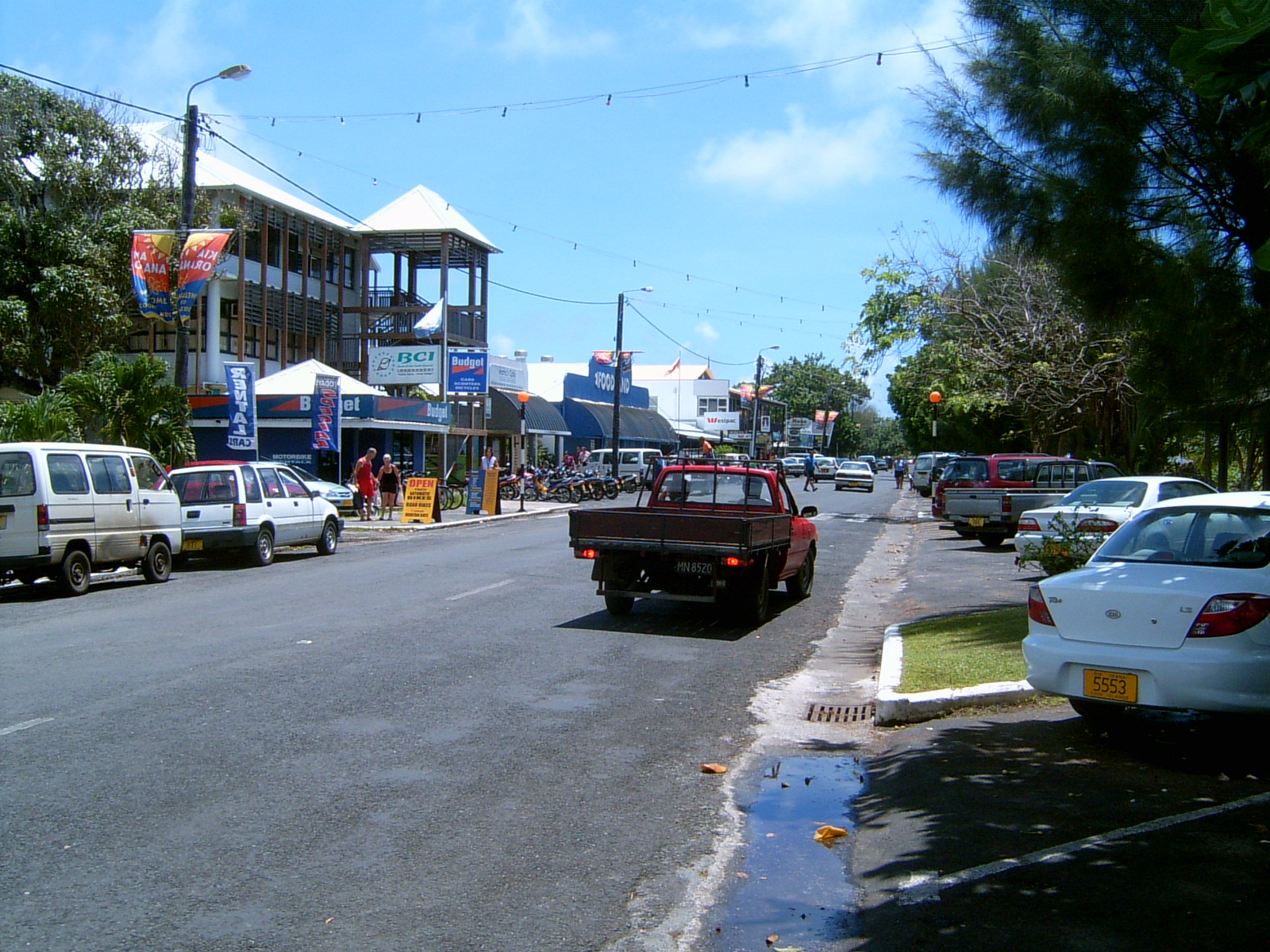
Avarua is the most populous centre on Rarotonga

Fletcher Christian visited the island in 1789 on HMS Bounty but did not land. Captain Theodore Walker sighted the island in 1813 on the ship Endeavour. The first recorded landing by a European was Captain Philip Goodenough with William Wentworth in 1814 on the schooner Cumberland. On 25 July 1823, while transporting the missionary Reverend John Williams, the Endeavour returned to Rarotonga. Papeiha, a London Missionary Society evangelist from Bora Bora, went ashore to teach his religion. Further missionaries followed, and by 1830 the island had converted to Christianity.

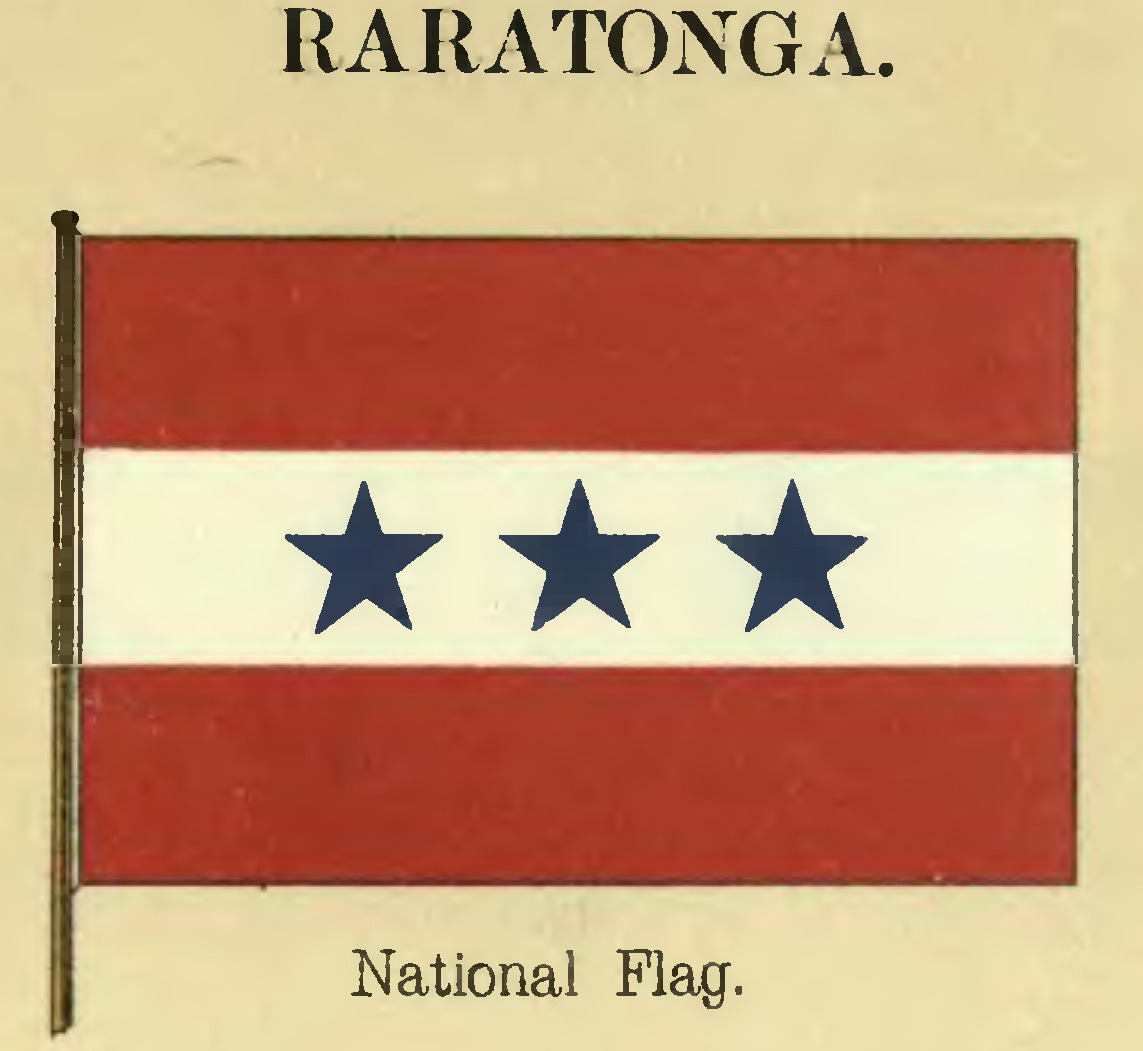
"RARATONGA [sic] National Flag" in 1899 publication by the United States Navy book, Flags of Maritime Nations

From 1830 to 1850, Rarotonga was a popular stop for whalers and trading schooners, and trade began with the outside world. The missionaries attempted to exclude other Europeans as a bad influence, and in 1845 Rarotongan ariki prohibited the sale of land to Europeans, though they were allowed to rent land on an annual basis. Despite a further ban on foreign settlement in 1848, European traders began to settle. In 1865, driven by rumours that France planned to annex the islands, the ariki of Rarotonga unsuccessfully petitioned Governor George Grey of New Zealand for British protection. In 1883 the Royal Navy de facto recognised the ariki of Rarotonga as an independent government. By this time Makea Takau Ariki had become paramount among the ariki, and was recognised as the "Queen of Rarotonga" on a visit to New Zealand. In 1888 the island became a British protectorate after a petition from the ariki. In 1901, it was annexed by New Zealand.

Historical population
Year	Pop.	±%
1906	2,441	—
1916	3,064	+25.5%
1926	3,936	+28.5%
1936	5,054	+28.4%
1945	5,573	+10.3%
1951	6,048	+8.5%
1961	8,676	+43.5%
1966	9,971	+14.9%
1971	11,478	+15.1%
1976	9,802	−14.6%
1981	9,530	−2.8%
1986	9,826	+3.1%
1996	11,225	+14.2%
2001	12,188	+8.6%
2006	13,890	+14.0%
2011	13,095	−5.7%
2016	13,007	−0.7%
2021	10,898	−16.2%

Oranges had been introduced by the Bounty mutineers, and after annexation developed into a major export crop, though exports had been disrupted by poor shipping. In 1945 the industry was revived with a government-led citrus replanting scheme, and in 1961 a canning factory was opened to allow the export of juice. The industry survived until the 1980s, but collapsed after New Zealand adopted Rogernomics and removed privileged market access.

An airstrip was built in 1944, leading to regular flights to Fiji, Tonga, Samoa and Aitutaki. The airport and better shipping links saw the beginnings of large-scale migration to New Zealand. Emigration increased further in the early 1970s when the airport was upgraded, but this was balanced by immigration from elsewhere in the Cook Islands.

Flooding in April and May 1967 damaged bridges on the island and caused widespread crop losses, raising risks of a food shortage. An unnamed tropical cyclone in December of that year left hundreds homeless and caused widespread devastation after demolishing homes and offices in Avarua. In December 1976 80% of the island's banana crop was destroyed by tropical cyclone Kim. In January 1987 Tropical Cyclone Sally made a thousand people homeless and damaged 80% of the buildings in Avarua.

== Demographics and settlements ==
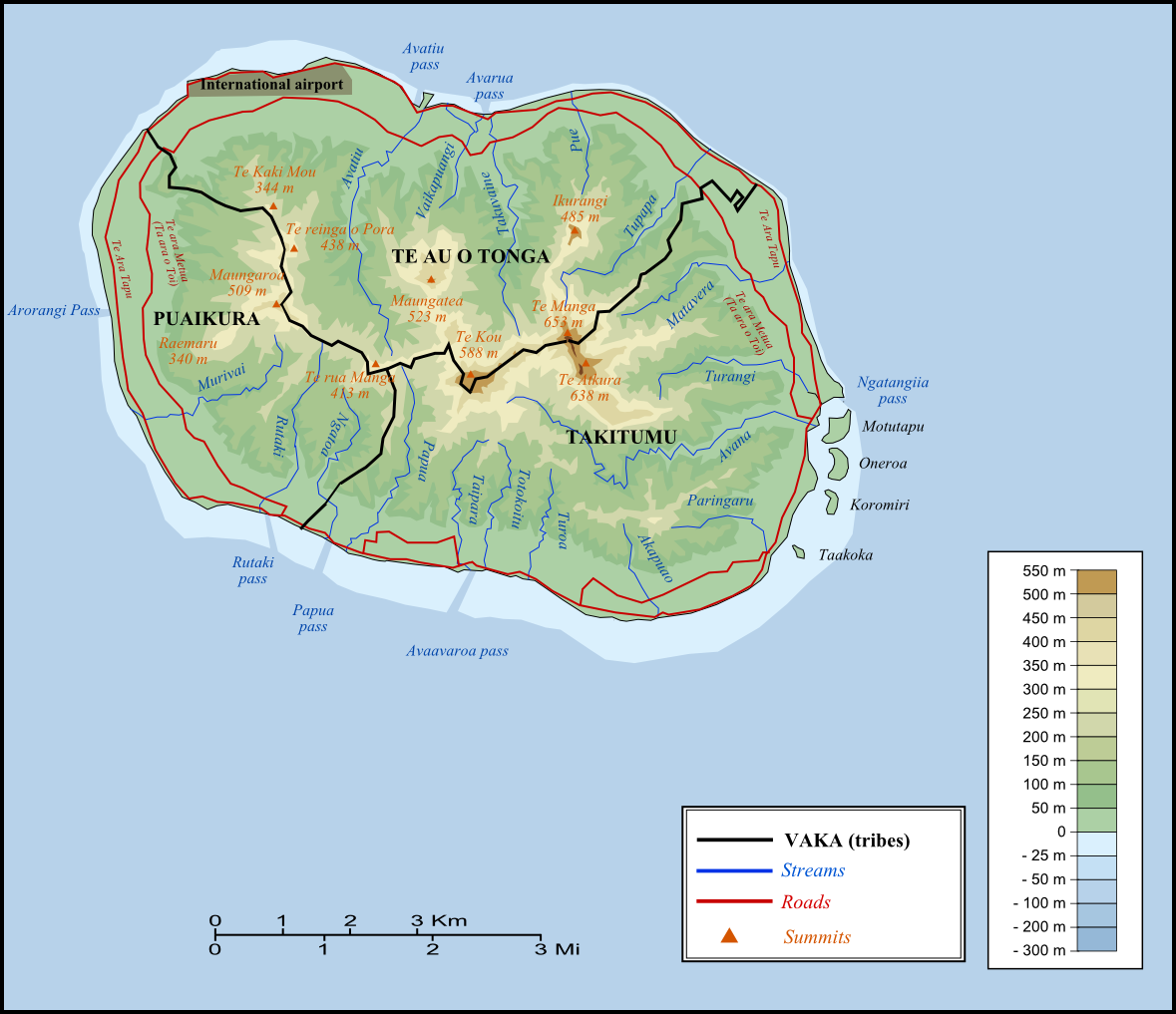
Tribal districts (vaka) of Rarotonga

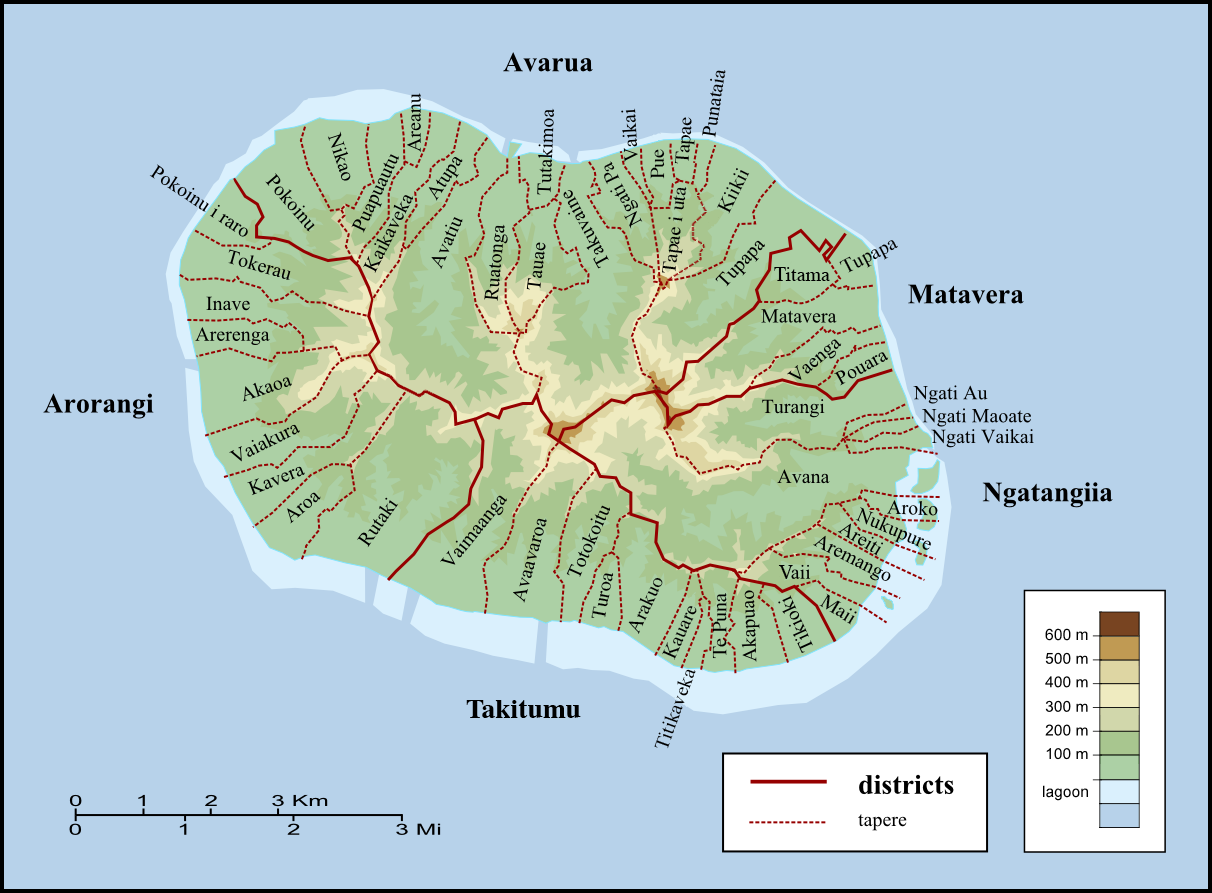
Land districts and tapere of Rarotonga

The population of Rarotonga was 10,898 in 2021.

The island is traditionally divided into three tribal districts or vaka: Te Au O Tonga on the northern side of the island (Avarua is the capital), Takitumu on the eastern and southern side, and Puaikura on the western side. For administrative purposes it is divided into five land districts. Te Au O Tonga is represented by the land district of Avarua, Takitumu is divided into the three land districts of Matavera, Ngatangiia and Titikaveka, and Puaikura is represented by the land district of Arorangi. The districts are subdivided into 54 tapere (traditional sub-districts). The three vaka councils of Rarotonga were abolished in 2008.

== Attractions and activities ==
Palm-studded white sandy beaches fringe most of the island. A popular cross-island walk connects Avatiu valley with the south side of the island, passing Te Rua Manga, the prominent needle-shaped rock visible from the air and some coastal areas. Hikes can also be taken to the Raemaru, or flat-top mountain. Other attractions include Wigmore Falls (Papua Falls) and the ancient marae of Arai te Tonga.

Popular activities include snorkeling, scuba diving, bike riding, kite surfing, hiking, deep-sea fishing, boat tours, scenic flights, and island shows. Many churches are open for service on Sunday, with a cappella singing. People congregate at the sea wall that skirts the end of the airport's runway to be "jetblasted" by aircraft.

== Transport ==
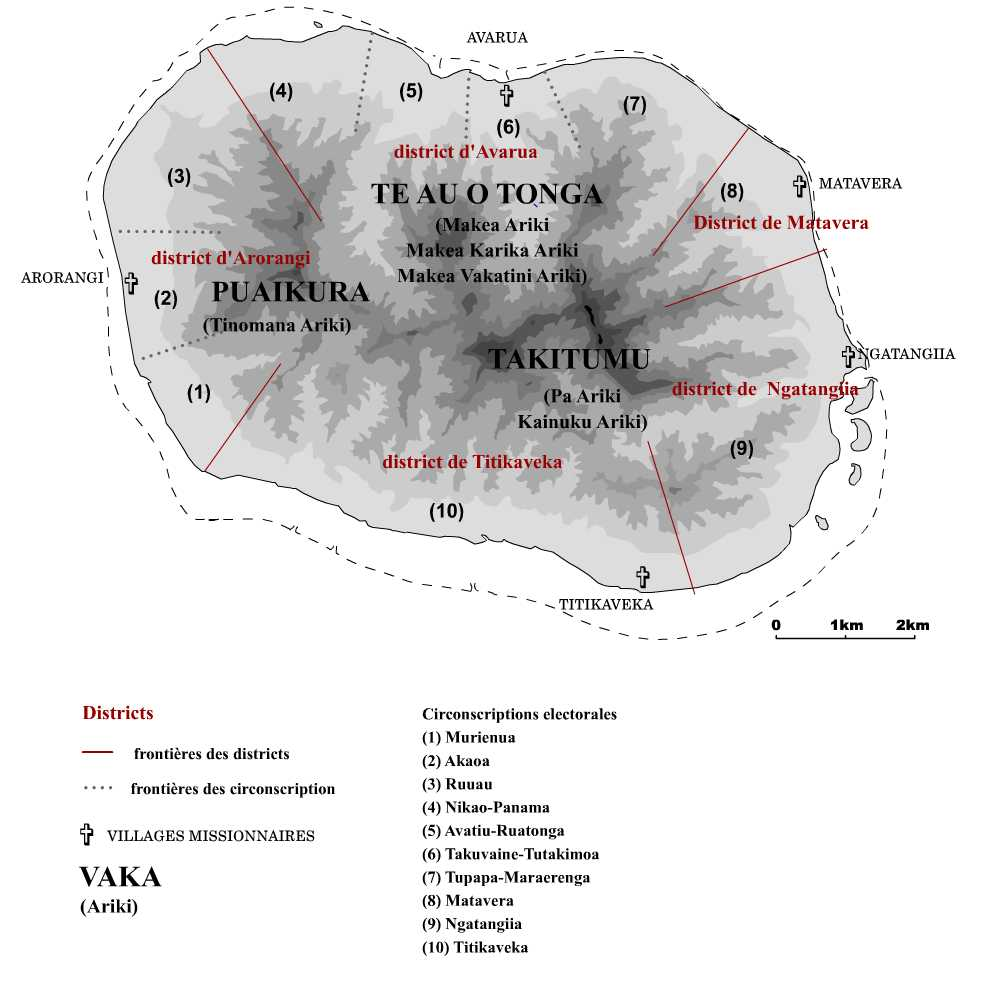
Map of Rarotonga's districts

The main road, Ara Tapu, circles Rarotonga, following the coast. Three-quarters of the island is also encircled by the ancient inner road, Ara Metua. Approximately 29 km (18 mi) long, this road was constructed in the 11th century and for most or all of its length was paved with large stone slabs. Along it are several important marae, including Arai Te Tonga, the most sacred shrine in Rarotonga. There is no road crossing the island, due to the mountainous interior.

Rarotonga has just two bus routes: clockwise and anticlockwise. The clockwise bus runs on an hourly schedule from 7 am until a last departure at 10 pm, with much shorter hours on Sundays. The anti-clockwise bus leaves Avarua on the half-hour from 8:30 am until 4.30 pm, with an earlier finish on Saturdays and no service on Sundays. There are bus stops, but the buses pick up and set down anywhere en route.

Rarotonga has three harbours, Avatiu, Avarua and Ngatangiia (also known as Avana), of which only Avatiu is of commercial significance. Avatiu serves a small fleet of inter-island and fishing vessels, with cargo ships regularly sailing to and from New Zealand. Cruise ships up to 120 m (390 ft) long can berth, while larger cruise ships regularly visit but have to anchor outside the harbour. Rarotonga International Airport is the only international airport of the Cook Islands.

== In popular culture ==
- The 1995 album Finn by the Finn Brothers ends with the song "Kiss the Road of Rarotonga", which was inspired by a motorcycle accident that Tim Finn had during a visit there.
- A number of feature-length films are linked to Rarotonga: Merry Christmas, Mr. Lawrence, depicting a Japanese POW camp for British prisoners in the island of Java in the year 1942, was filmed here, The Other Side of Heaven, which is set in Niuatoputapu, Tonga, but was filmed in part on Rarotonga, and Johnny Lingo which was set here.
- In 1951, Mexican writers Yolanda Vargas Dulché and Guillermo de la Parra wrote Rarotonga, a comic book whose plot unfolds on the island. The heroine of the story is Zonga, an enigmatic woman with superhuman powers. The comic inspired a Mexican movie filmed in 1978 and a song by the Mexican rock band Café Tacuba.

== Gallery ==
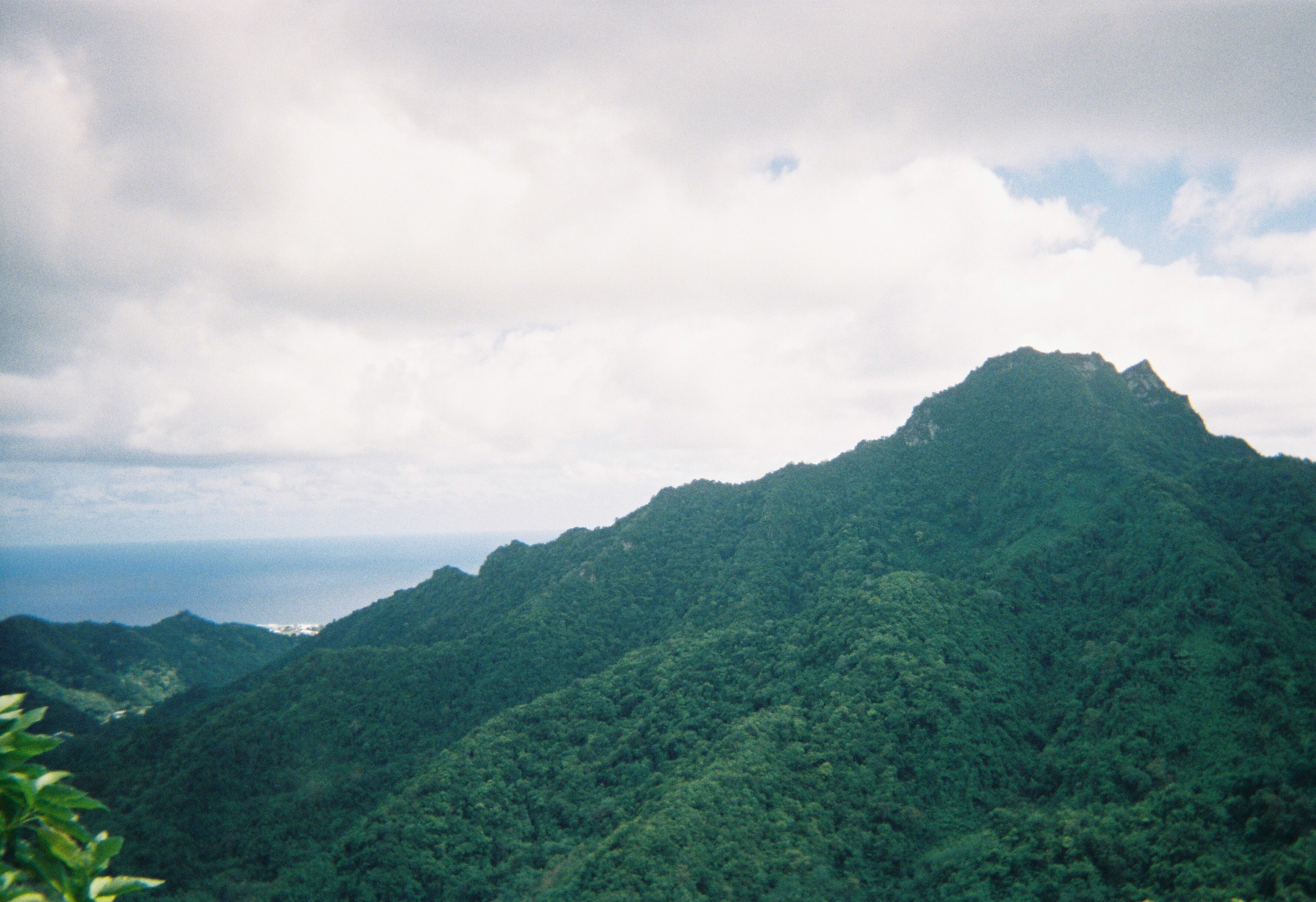
Te Rua Manga (the Needle) lookout

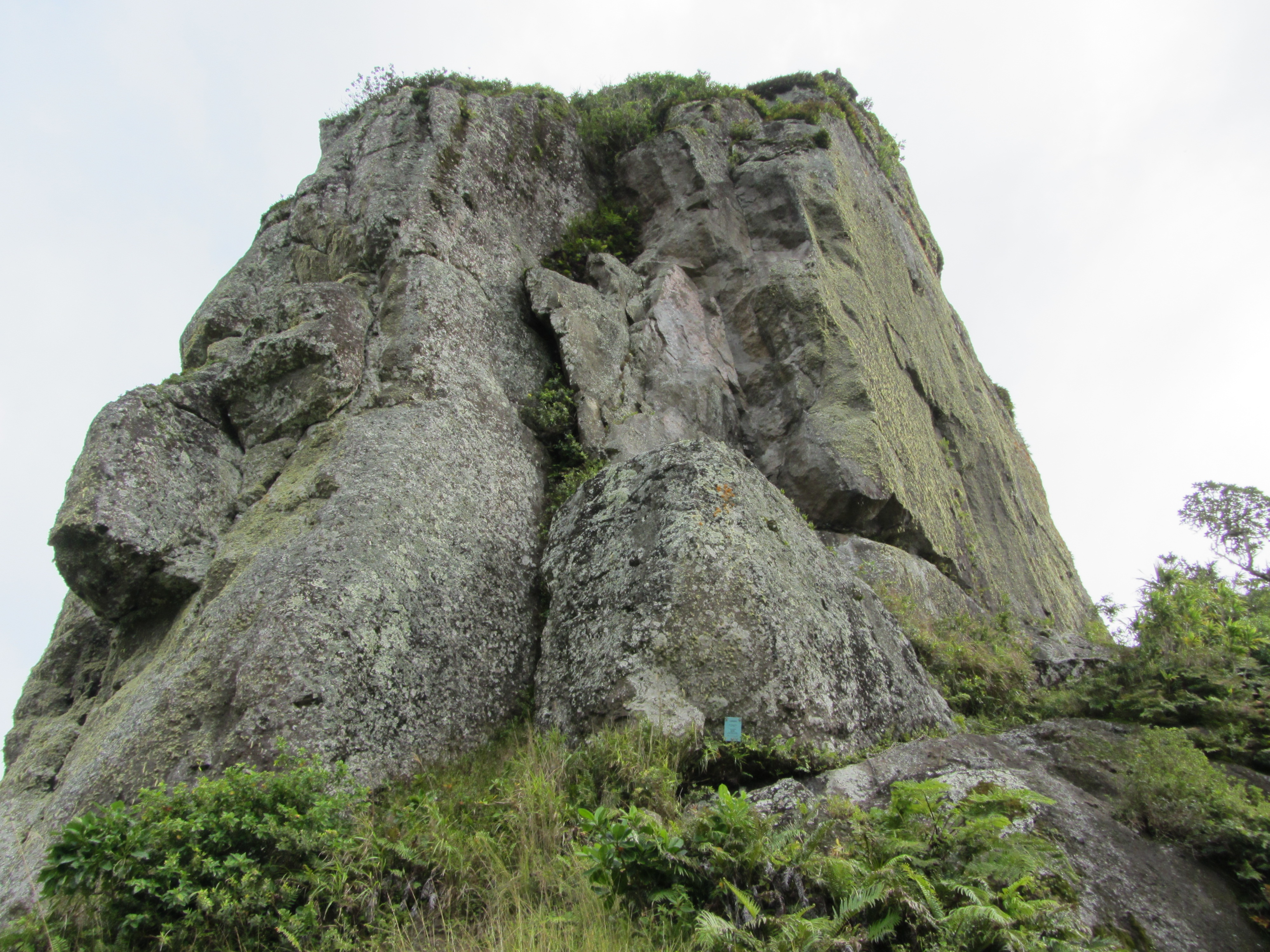
Te Rua Manga (the Needle)

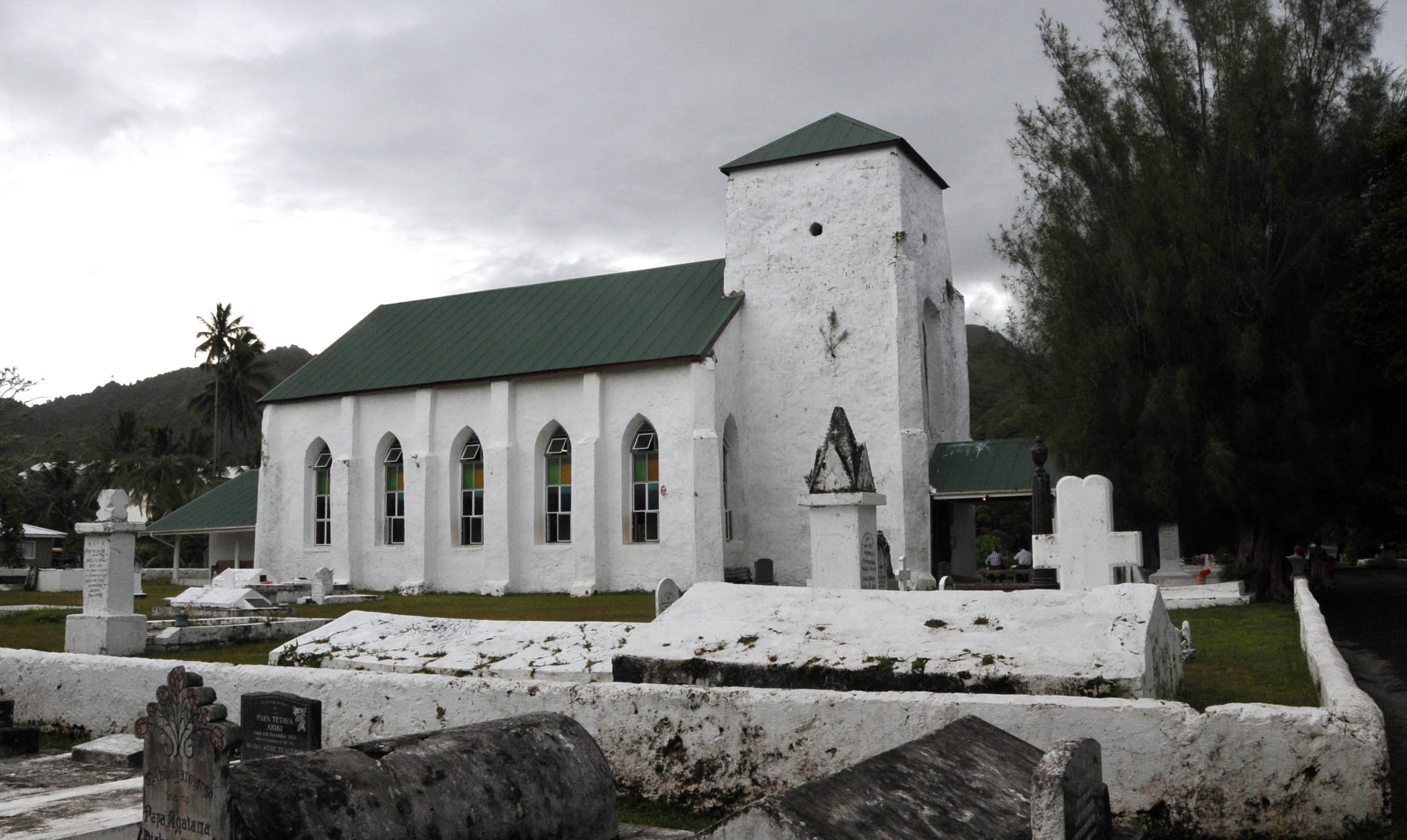
Cook Islands Christian Church (CICC) in Avarua

== See also ==
- Auparu – in Cook Islands mythology, Auparu ("gentle dew") is a stream in Rarotonga, the bathing-place of nymphs or fairies.
- Diocese of Rarotonga (Catholic)
- Nukutere College – the country's only Roman Catholic secondary school
- Treaty of Rarotonga – 1985 South Pacific Nuclear Free Zone Treaty
