= Mangarongaro (Penrhyn) =

Islet in Cook Islands

Coordinates: 9°3′11.66″S 157°59′11.93″W

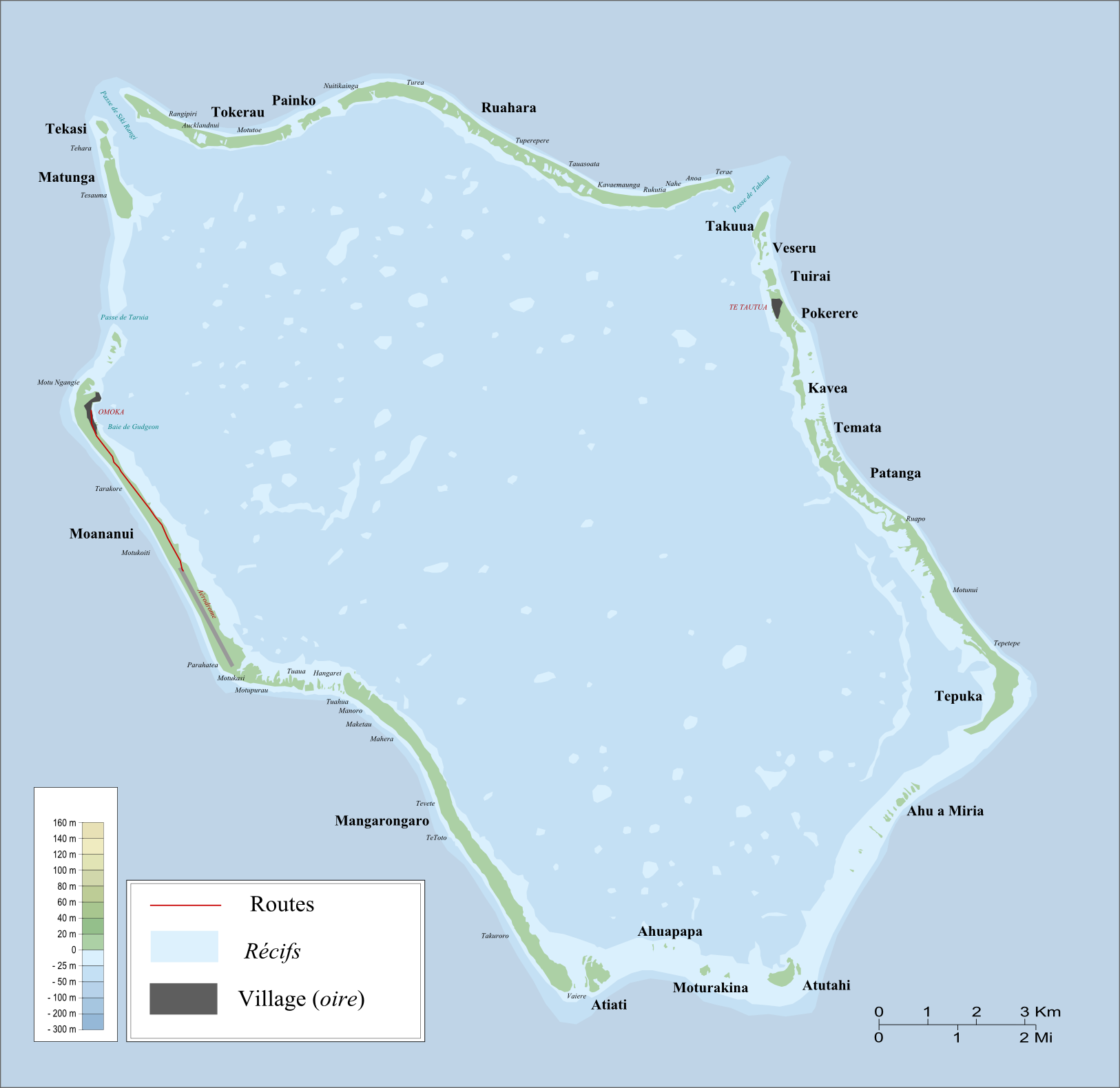
Map of Penrhyn Atoll

Mangarongaro is an islet in Penrhyn Atoll (Tongareva) in the Cook Islands, in the South Pacific Ocean. Mangarongaro makes up most of the southwestern rim of the atoll, south of Moananui Islet and west of Atiati. The islet was once inhabited, and contains the remains of two marae, Rakahanga and Te Vete.
