= Tokerau =

Tokerau may refer to:

- Tokerau (Penrhyn), Cook Islands
- Tokerau Beach, Northland, New Zealand
- Tokerau Marae, at Pongakawa, Bay of Plenty, New Zealand
- Northland Region (Māori: Te Tai Tokerau), New Zealand
- Te Tai Tokerau, an electorate of New Zealand
