= Teremoana =

Teremoana is a given name and surname. It may refer to:

- Teremoana Rapley (born 1973), New Zealand rapper and presenter
- Teremoana Tapi Taio (1945–2024), Cook Islands politician
- Teremoana Teremoana (born 1998), Australian boxer
