= Moturakina =

Coordinates: 9°4′51.82″S 157°56′24.22″W

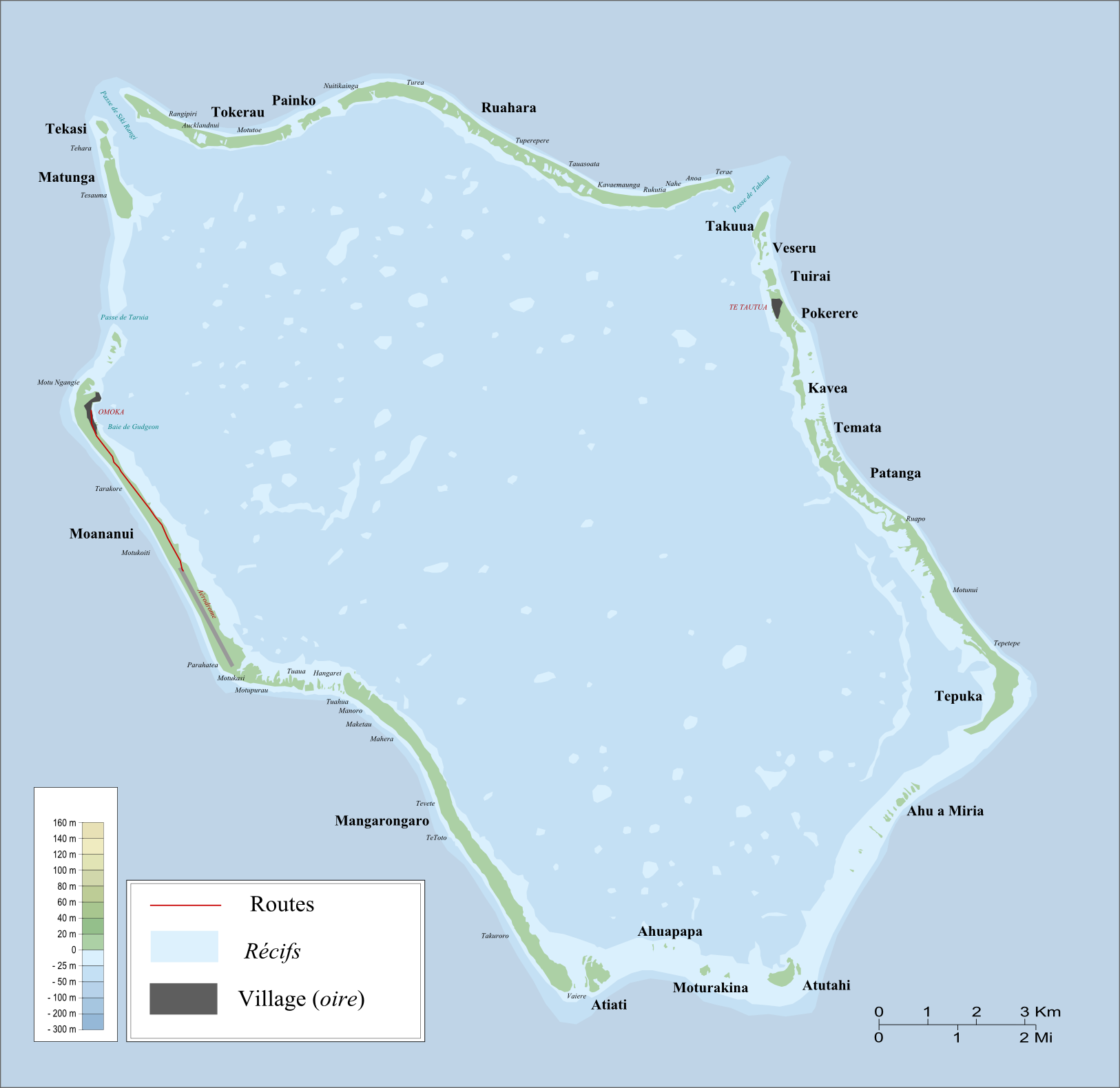
Map of Penrhyn Atoll

Moturakina is an islet in Penrhyn Atoll (Tongareva) in the Cook Islands. It lies between Atiati and Atutahi, in the middle of the southern rim of the atoll.
