= Taio Shipping =

Shipping company in the Cook Islands

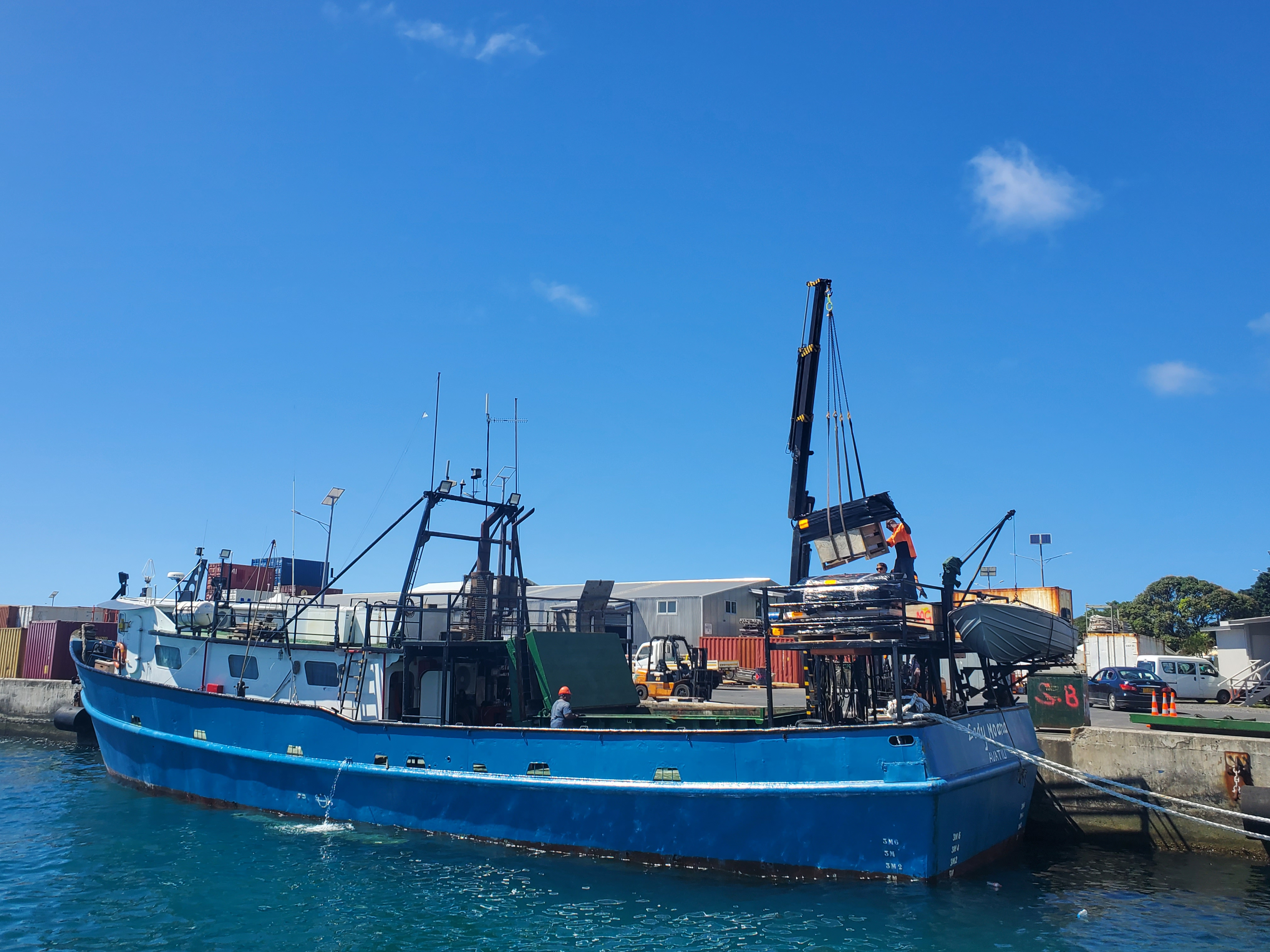
- MV Lady Moana in Avatiu harbour, 2025
- Industry: Transport
- Founded: 1991
- Area served: Cook Islands
- Key people: Teremoana Tapi Taio
- Products: Sea transport

Taio Shipping is the main inter-island shipping company in the Cook Islands. It operates freight and passenger services between Rarotonga and the outer islands, with services once or twice a month to Atiu, Mitiaro, Mauke and Mangaia, once every two months to Penrhyn, Rakahanga and Manihiki, and once every two and a half months to Palmerston and Pukapuka.

== History ==
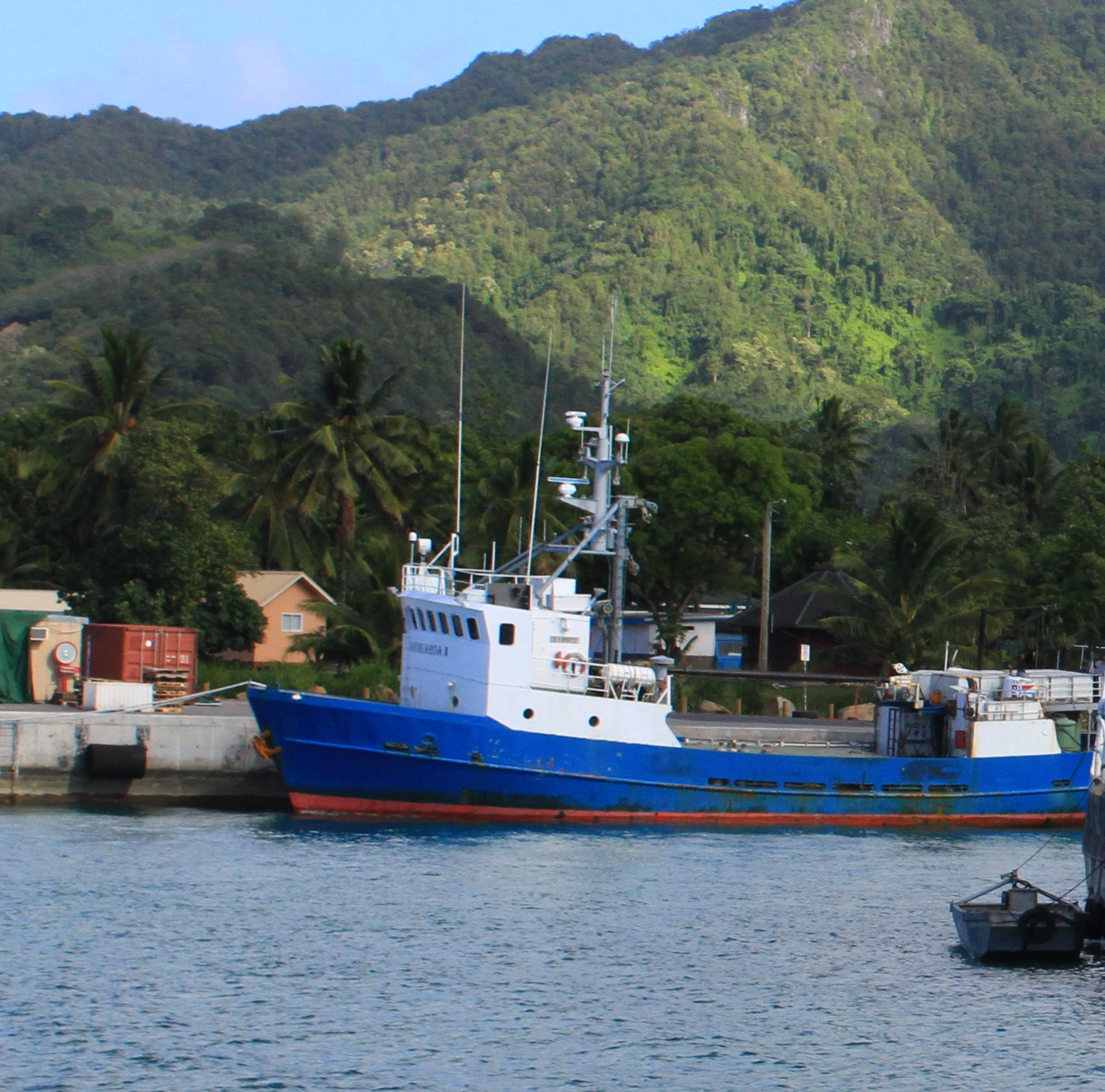
MV Maungaroa II in Avatiu harbour, 2013

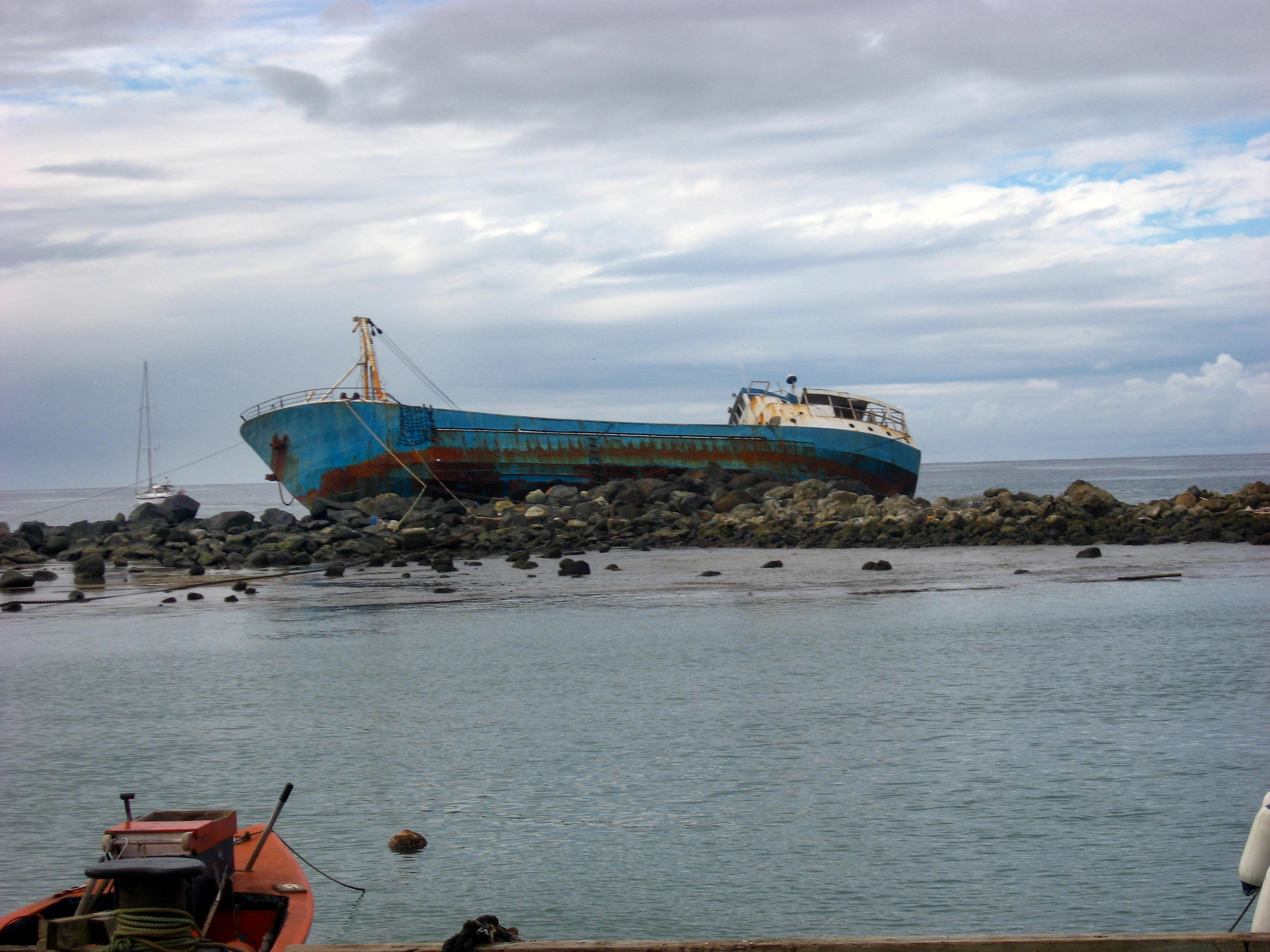
MV Maungaroa wrecked on a breakwater at Avatiu, 2008

The company was established in 1991 when Teremoana Tapi Taio purchased a damaged boat, the Acadia, in Rarotonga and obtained a shipping licence.

In September 2005 the Manu Nui ran out of fuel and drifted while travelling from Pukapuka to Rarotonga, after failing to refuel.

In June 2006 Taio Shipping diverted the MV Maungaroa from its usual schedule for a charter for the producers of Survivor: Cook Islands, causing a fuel and electricity crisis on the island of Mangaia. In January 2008 the MV Maungaroa ran aground at Avatiu during a storm.

In October 2010 the MV Te Kou Maru II was stranded on the reef at Mauke. The wreck was left to rust for several years.

In January 2017 the newly purchased MV Moana Nui was wrecked on a reef in Nassau. An investigation attributed the wreck to lack of a detailed chart, inadequate radio communication, and lack of familiarity with the reef. The wreck was still in place a year later. A contract to salvage and remove the wreck was issued in November 2019.

In September 2019 all of the company's ships were detained by the Cook Islands Ministry of Transport after a child was lost overboard from the MV Lady Moana while travelling from Rakahanga to Rarotonga. A subsequent safety assessment by Maritime New Zealand found significant failings on the company's ships, and as a result the MV Grinna II was approved to carry only 12 passengers while the passenger licences for the MV Maungaroa II and MV Lady Moana were withdrawn. While the ships were detained, the northern islands ran out of imported food and petrol. In 2020 the MV Maungaroa II was taken out of service pending sale, and a larger vessel, the MV Maungaroa III, was purchased to replace it.

On 21 March 2022 the Grinna II ran aground on the reef at Manihiki. The vessel was deemed unsalvageable.

== Fleet ==
=== Current ===
Name	Built	In service	Gross tonnage	Passengers	Notes
MV Lady Moana	1997	2013 –	163 GT	0	Lost a child overboard at sea in 2019. Passenger licence withdrawn 2019.

=== Past ===
Name	Built	In service	Gross tonnage	Passengers	Notes
Grinna II	1980	2018–2022	283 GT	12	Wrecked at Manihiki March 2022
Maungaroa II	1978	– 2019	153 GT	0	Passenger licence withdrawn 2019
MV Moana Nui	1967	2016–2017	272 GT	50	Wrecked at Nassau January 2017
MV Te Kou Maru II	1977	– 2010	153 GT		Wrecked at Mauke 2010
MV Maungaroa	1967	1996–2008	220 GT		Wrecked at Rarotonga 2008
Manu Nui	1960	2000 –	465 GT		
Acadia		1991 – ?			
