= Tepuka (Penrhyn) =

Islet in Cook Islands

Coordinates: 9°1′48.74″S 157°53′4.11″W

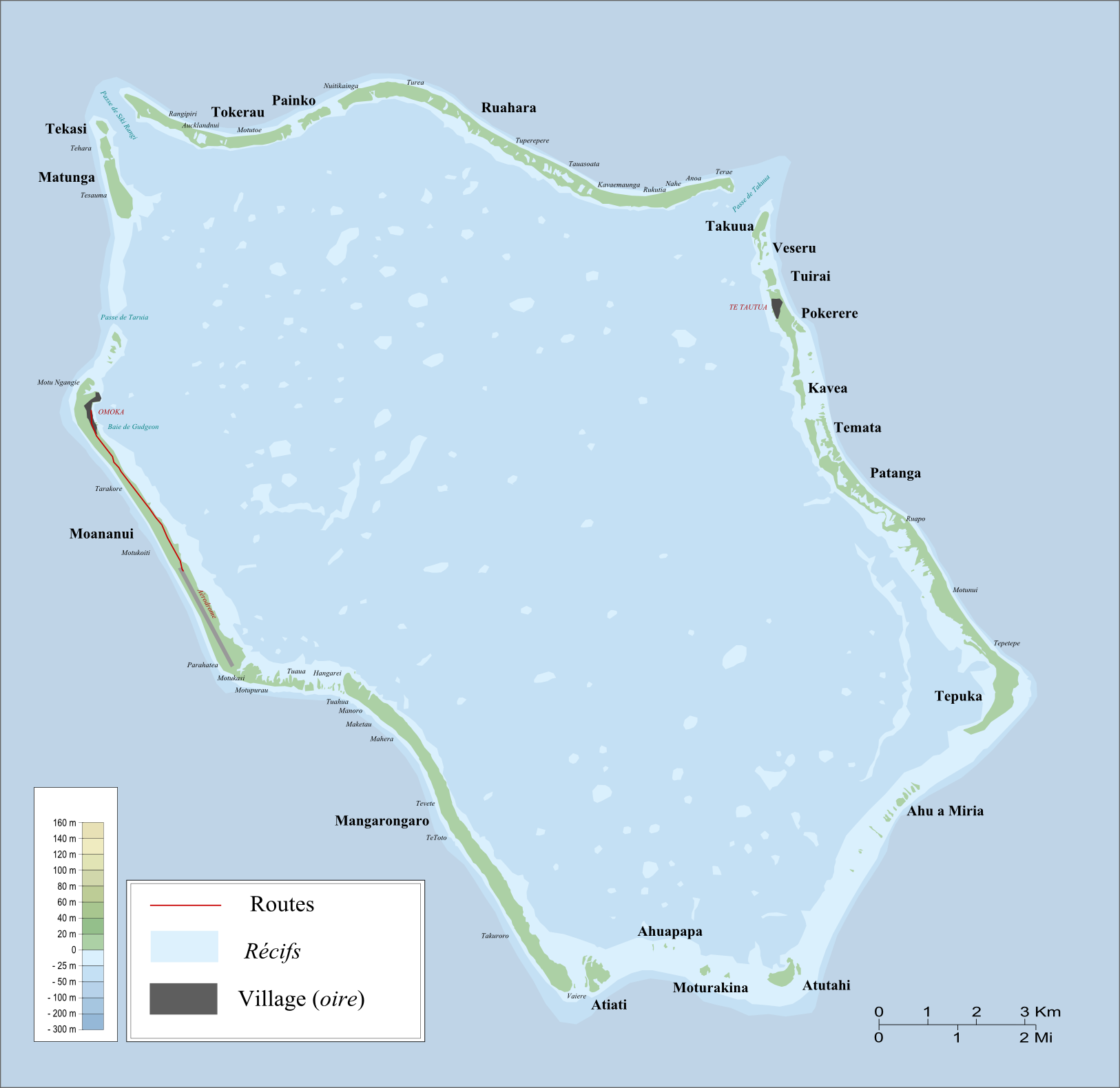
Map of Penrhyn Atoll

Tepuka is an islet in Penrhyn Atoll (Tongareva) in the Cook Islands. It is on the south-eastern edge of the atoll, between Ahu a Miria and Patanga. The island was once inhabited, and contains the remains of two marae, Te Puka-nui and Punaruku. The latter was the site of a village and missionary church, abandoned after the island was almost completely depopulated by Peruvian slavers.
