= Tuirai =

Coordinates: 8°57′10.21″S 157°55′37.03″W

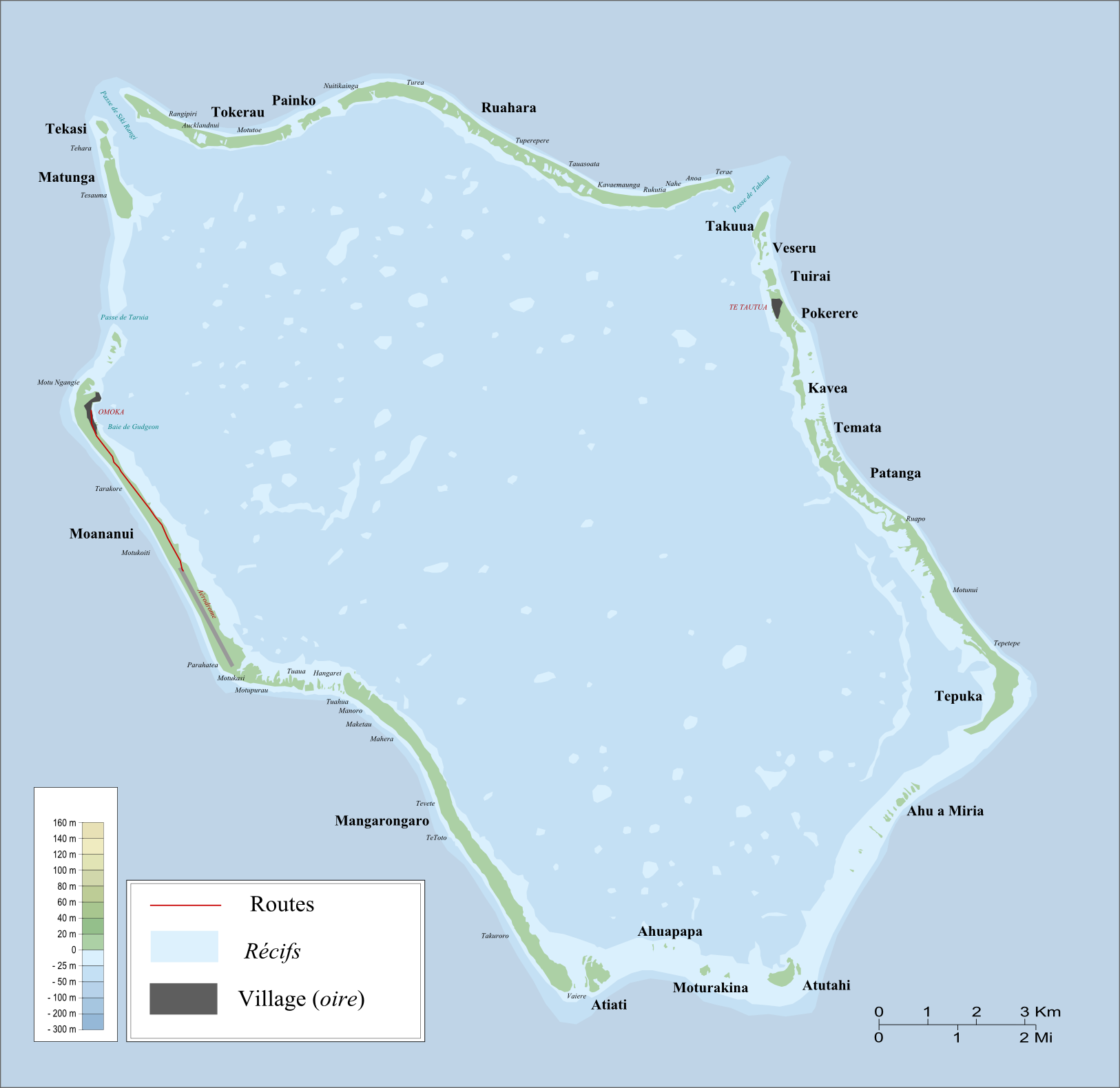
Map of Penrhyn Atoll

Tuirai is an islet in Penrhyn Atoll (Tongareva) in the Cook Islands, in the South Pacific Ocean. It is on the eastern edge of the atoll, between Pokerekere Islet and Veseru.
