= Kavea =

Coordinates: 9°4′55.86″S 157°55′32.29″W

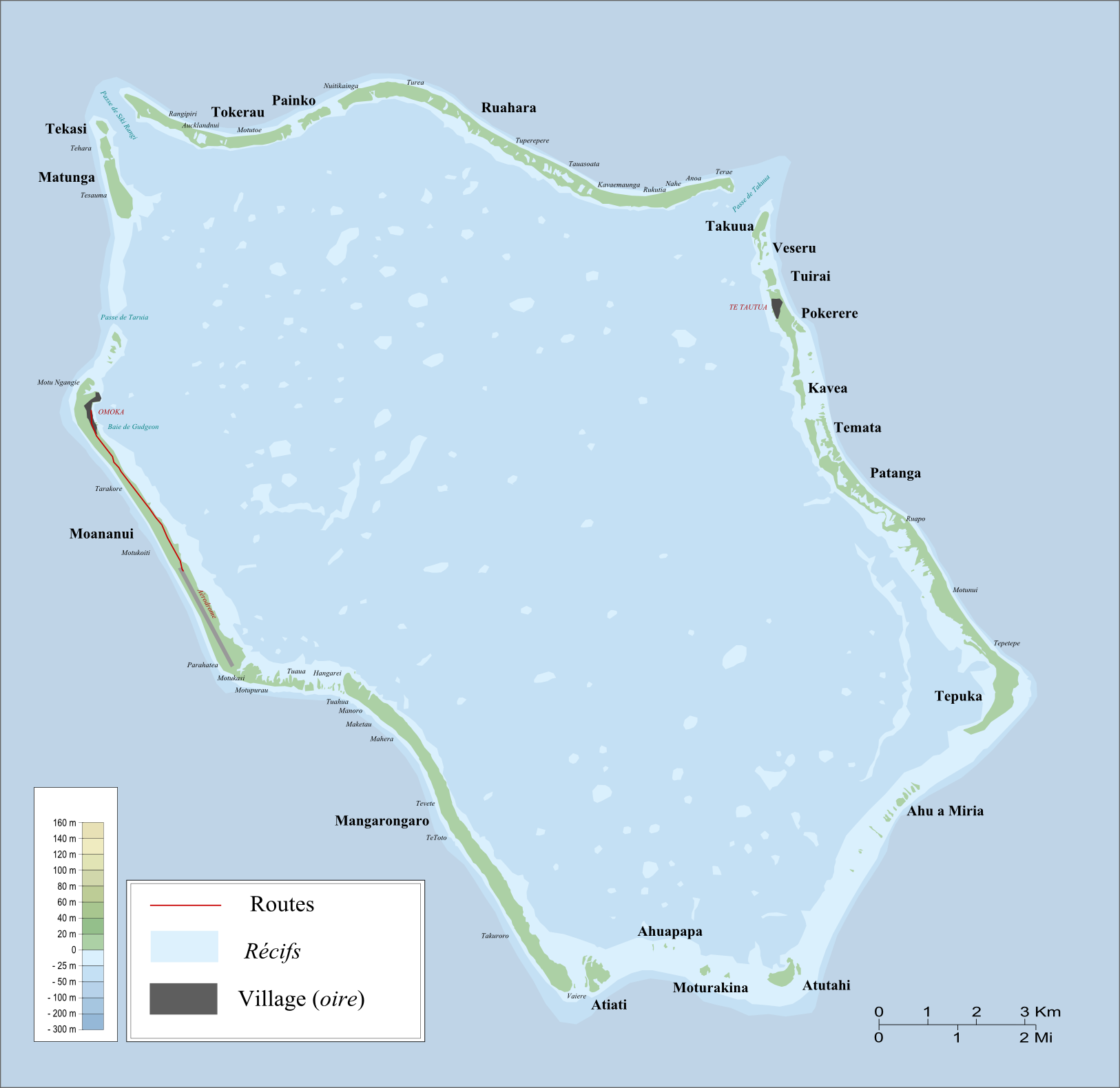
Map of Penrhyn Atoll

Kavea is an islet in Penrhyn Atoll (Tongareva) in the Cook Islands, in the South Pacific Ocean. It is on the eastern edge of the atoll, between Temata and Pokerekere Islet. Kavea was once inhabited and contains a marae, Mahora-kura.
