= Takuua =

Cook Islands

Coordinates: 8°56′35.1″S 157°55′42.82″W

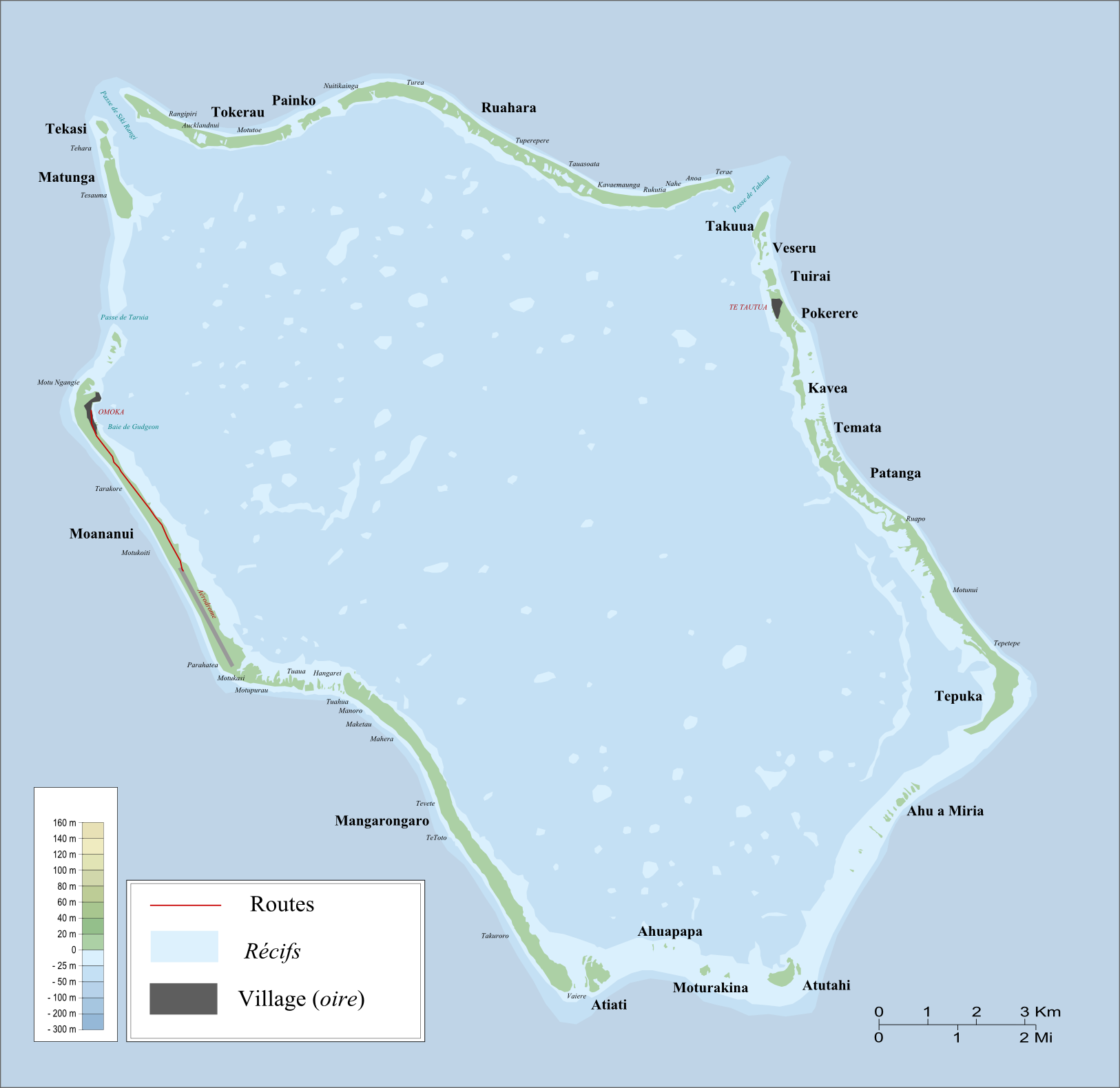
Map of Penrhyn Atoll

Takuua is an islet in Penrhyn Atoll (Tongareva) in the Cook Islands, in the South Pacific Ocean. Takuua is on the eastern edge of the atoll, between Veseru and Ruahara.
