= Tokerau (Penrhyn) =

Islet in Penrhyn Atoll in the Cook Islands

Coordinates: 8°55′32.83″S 158°2′3.21″W

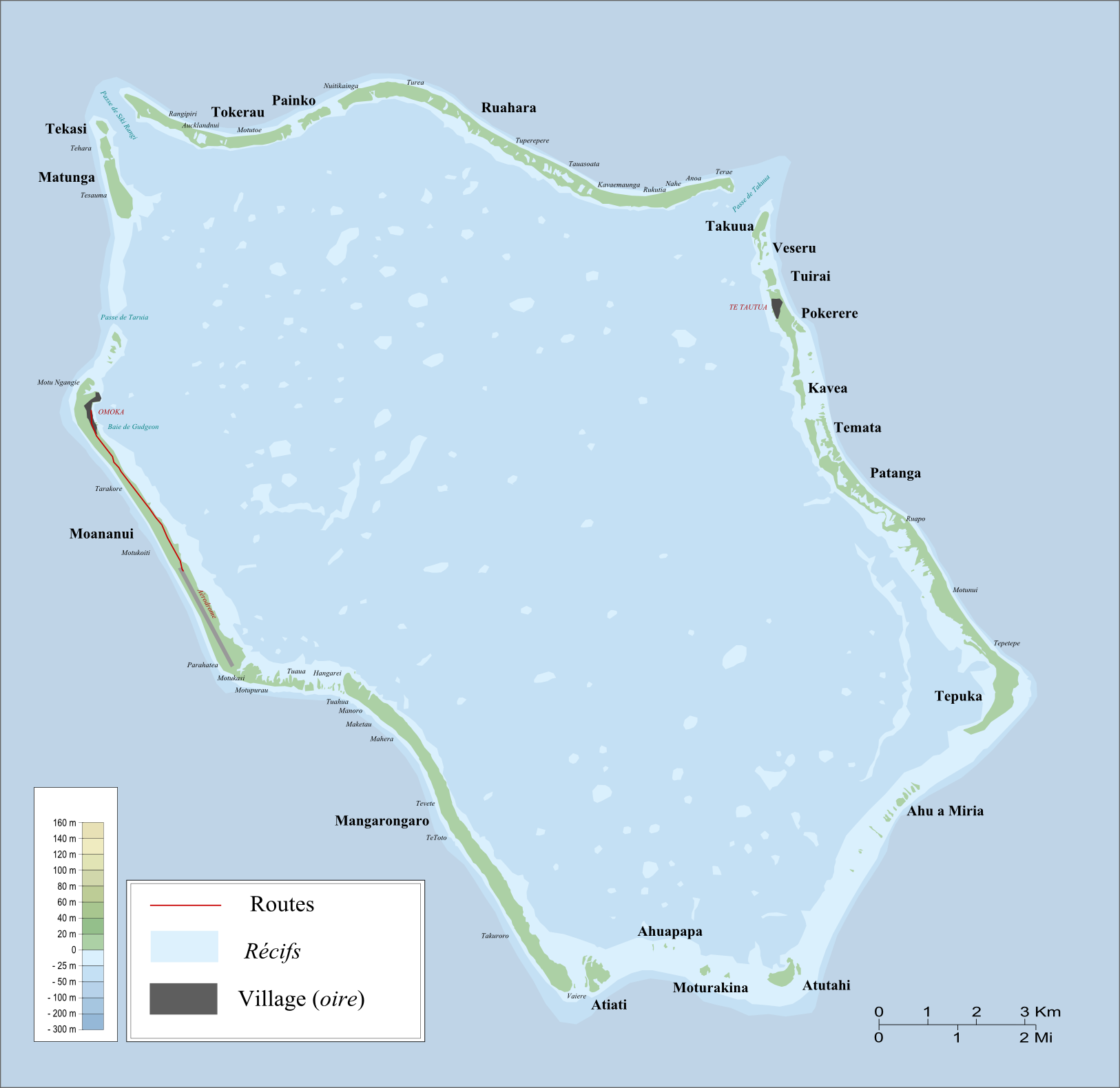
Map of Penrhyn Atoll

Tokerau is an islet in Penrhyn atoll (Tongareva) in the Cook Islands, in the South Pacific Ocean. Tokerau is on the northern edge of the atoll, between Tekasi and Painko. The island was once inhabited and contains a marae, Tokerau.
