= Painko =

Coordinates: 8°55′22.15″S 158°0′40.09″W

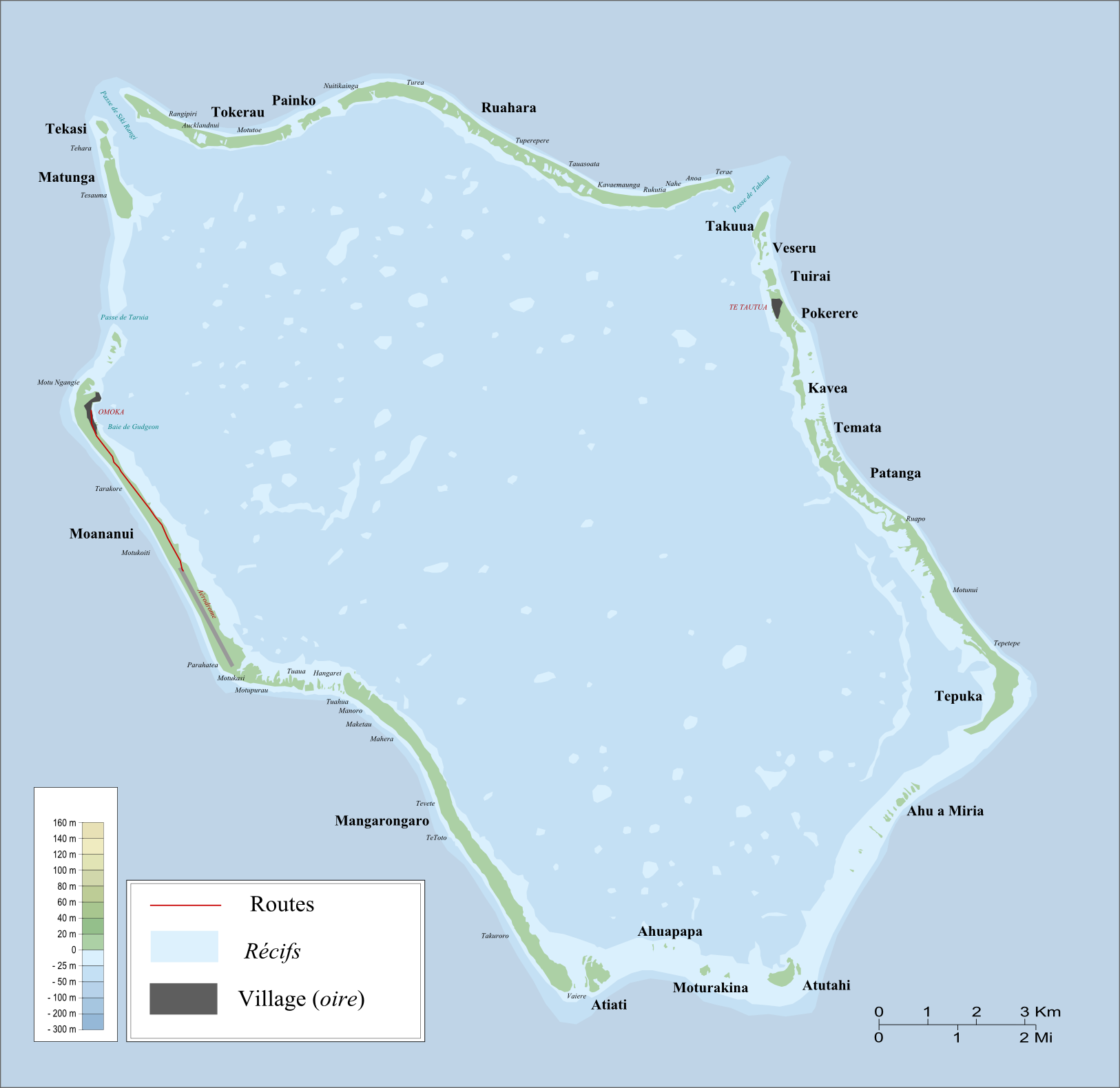
Map of Penrhyn Atoll

Painko is an islet in Penrhyn Atoll (Tongareva) in the Cook Islands, in the South Pacific Ocean. Painko is on the northern edge of the atoll, between Tokearu and Ruahara.
