= Tongareva Airport =

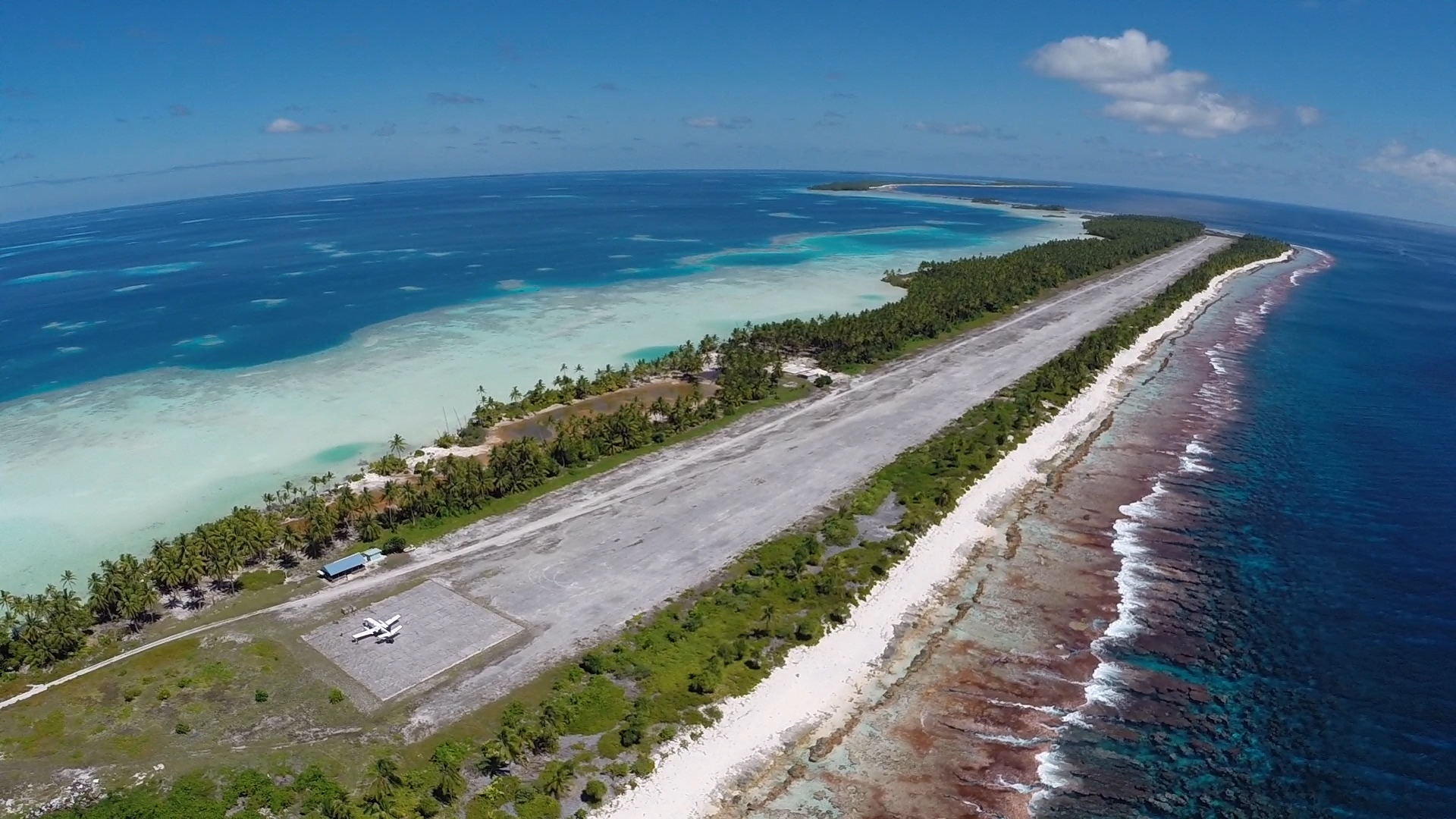
- IATA: PYE; ICAO: NCPY

Summary
- Location: Penrhyn Island, Cook Islands
- Elevation AMSL: 8 ft / 3 m
- Coordinates: 09°00′24″S 158°02′12″W
- Website: Cook Islands Airports
- Interactive map of Tongareva Airport

Runways
Direction	Length		Surface
Direction	ft	m	Surface
14/32	7,530	2,295	most likely coral or old concrete

Tongareva Airport is an airport on Penrhyn Island in the Cook Islands. The airport lies a mere 8 feet (3 m) above the mean sea level.

== History ==
During World War II, Tongareva was of strategic importance. In 1942, 1,000 U.S. servicemen began constructing a 10,000 ft airstrip on the motu of Moananui. The airstrip was used by the American military until 1946. The island was not directly attacked, but was used for transport of men and materials.

== Airlines and destinations ==
There are no scheduled flights; however, Air Rarotonga operates regular charter flights to the island from Rarotonga using Embraer Bandeirante and Cessna Citation II aircraft as well as occasional charters to Kiritimati in Kiribati.
