= Te Tautua =

Settlement on Pokerekere Islet, Cook Islands

Coordinates: 8°57′S 157°55′W

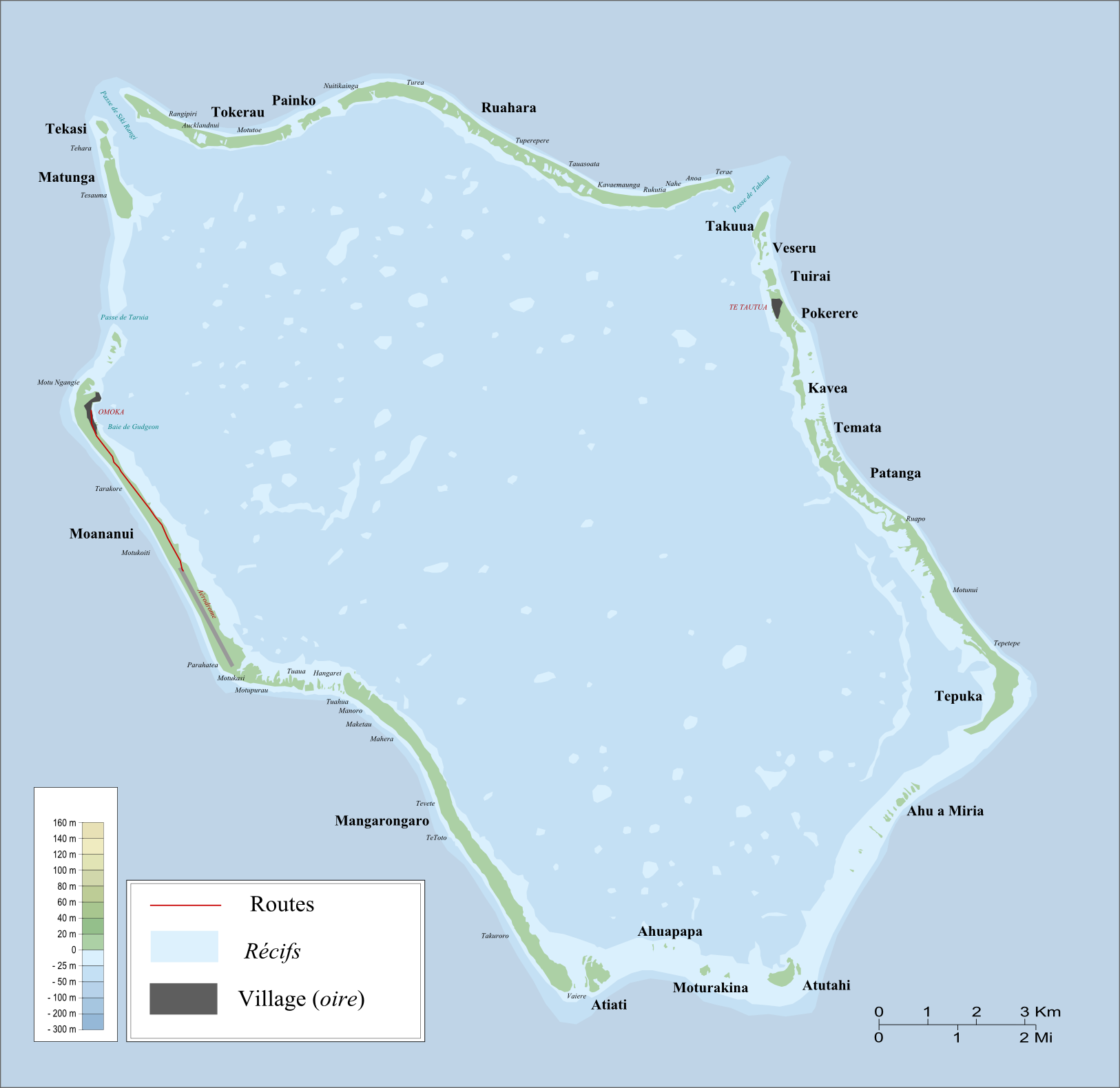
Penrhyn

Te Tautua is the smaller of the two main settlements on Penrhyn Atoll in the Cook Islands. It is located on Pokerekere Islet, which is also known as Pokerere or Tautua.
