= Atutahi (Penrhyn) =

Coordinates: 9°4′55.86″S 157°55′32.29″W

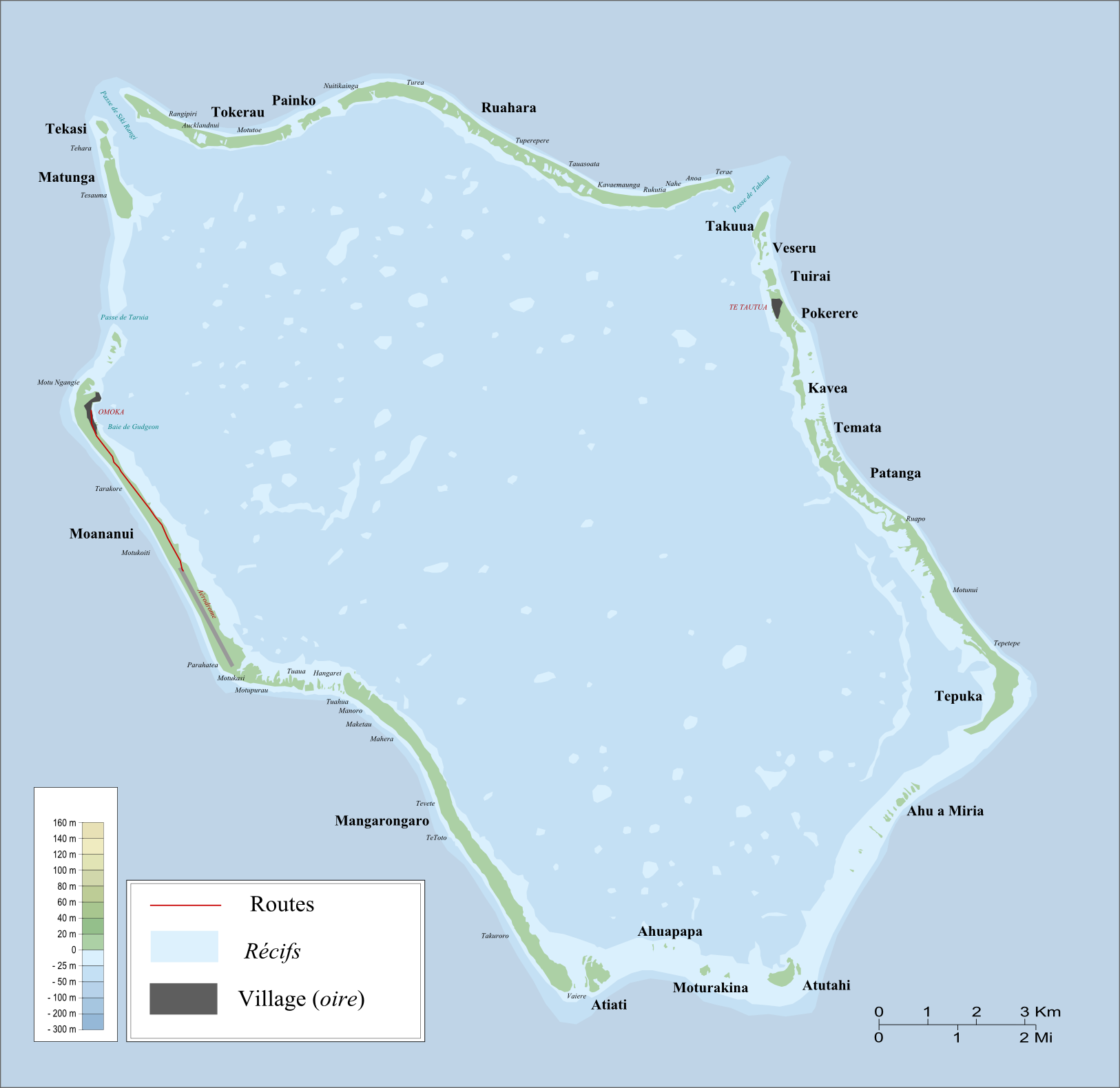
Map of Penrhyn Atoll

Atutahi is an islet in Penrhyn Atoll (Tongareva) in the Cook Islands, in the South Pacific Ocean. It is on the southern edge of the atoll, between Moturakina and Ahu a Miria. The island contains both a marae, Te Rupe-tangi-rekareka, and a stone ellipse.
