= Omoka =

Largest settlement on the Penrhyn Atoll in the Cook Islands

Coordinates: 8°59′S 158°04′W

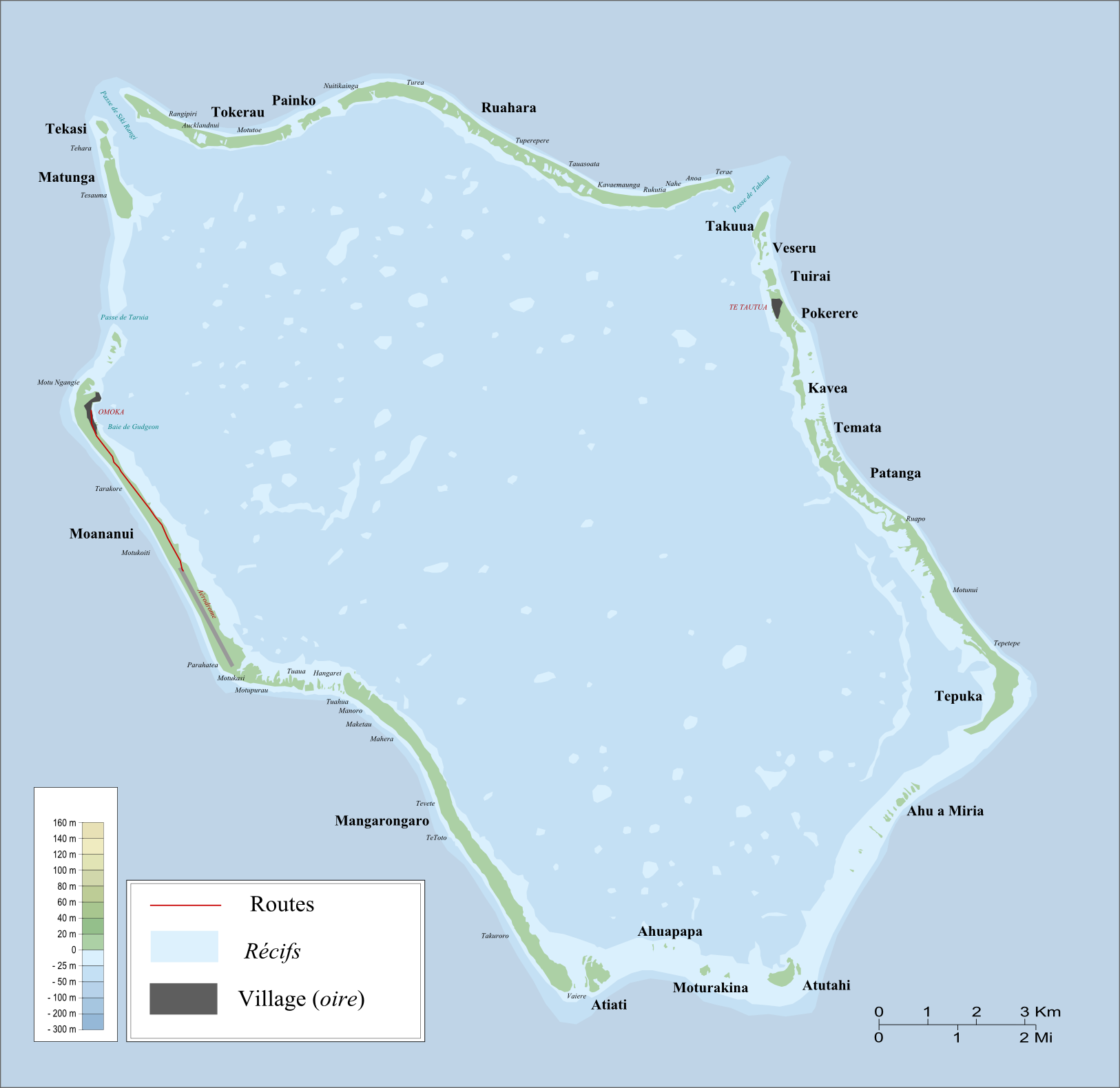
Penrhyn

Omoka is the larger of the two main settlements on Penrhyn Atoll in the Cook Islands. It is the location of the Penrhyn island Council, and is located on Moananui Islet in the far west of Penrhyn Atoll.

The small village has two main roads running through it with four connecting roads, one of which marks the end of the village where the land ends. It is home to between 100 and 200 residents and includes approximately 150 buildings, including the islands council building, Penrhyn hospital, and a Cook Islands Christian Church.

During the Second World War, the United States military built a port at Omaka village to support the movement of American military personnel, supplies and aircraft in the Pacific theatre. in September 2026, the New Zealand and United States governments signed an agreement to jointly upgrade Omoka's port. Under the agreement, the United States would contribute US$50 million to the port while New Zealand would contribute US$10 million.
