= Pokerekere Islet =

Islet in the Cook Islands

Coordinates: 8°57′S 157°55′W

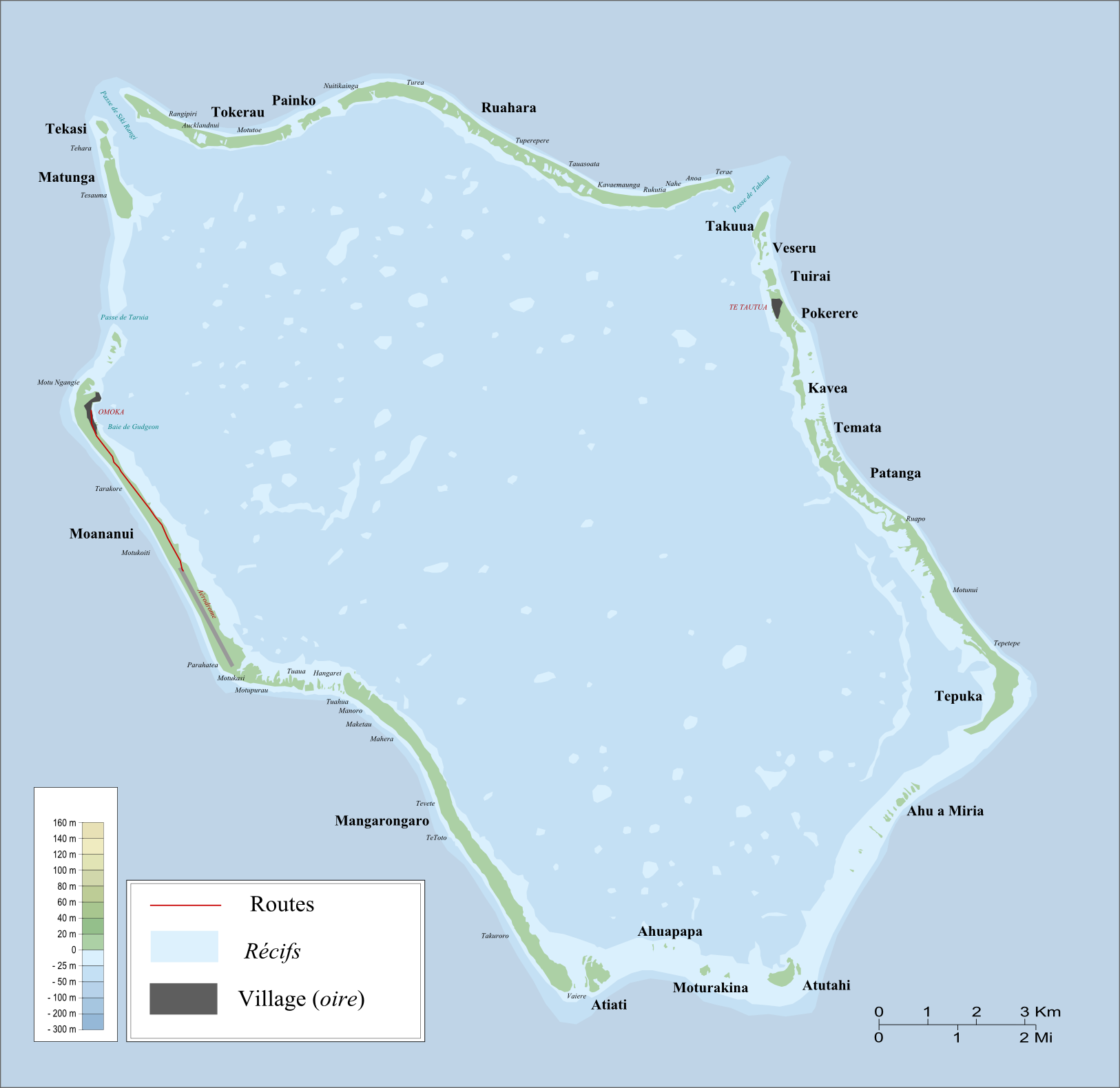
Map of Penrhyn Atoll, with Pokerekere (Pokerere) shown in the east

Pokerekere Islet, also known as Pokerere or Tautua, is an islet in Penrhyn Atoll (Tongareva) in the Cook Islands. It is located on the eastern edge of the atoll, between Kavea and Tuirai.

The village Te Tautua is situated on Pokerekere. The village church is built on the site of the old marae, Papaki-reia.
