= Patanga (Penrhyn) =

Cook Islands islet in the Pacific Ocean

Coordinates: 8°59′27.17″S 157°54′42.27″W

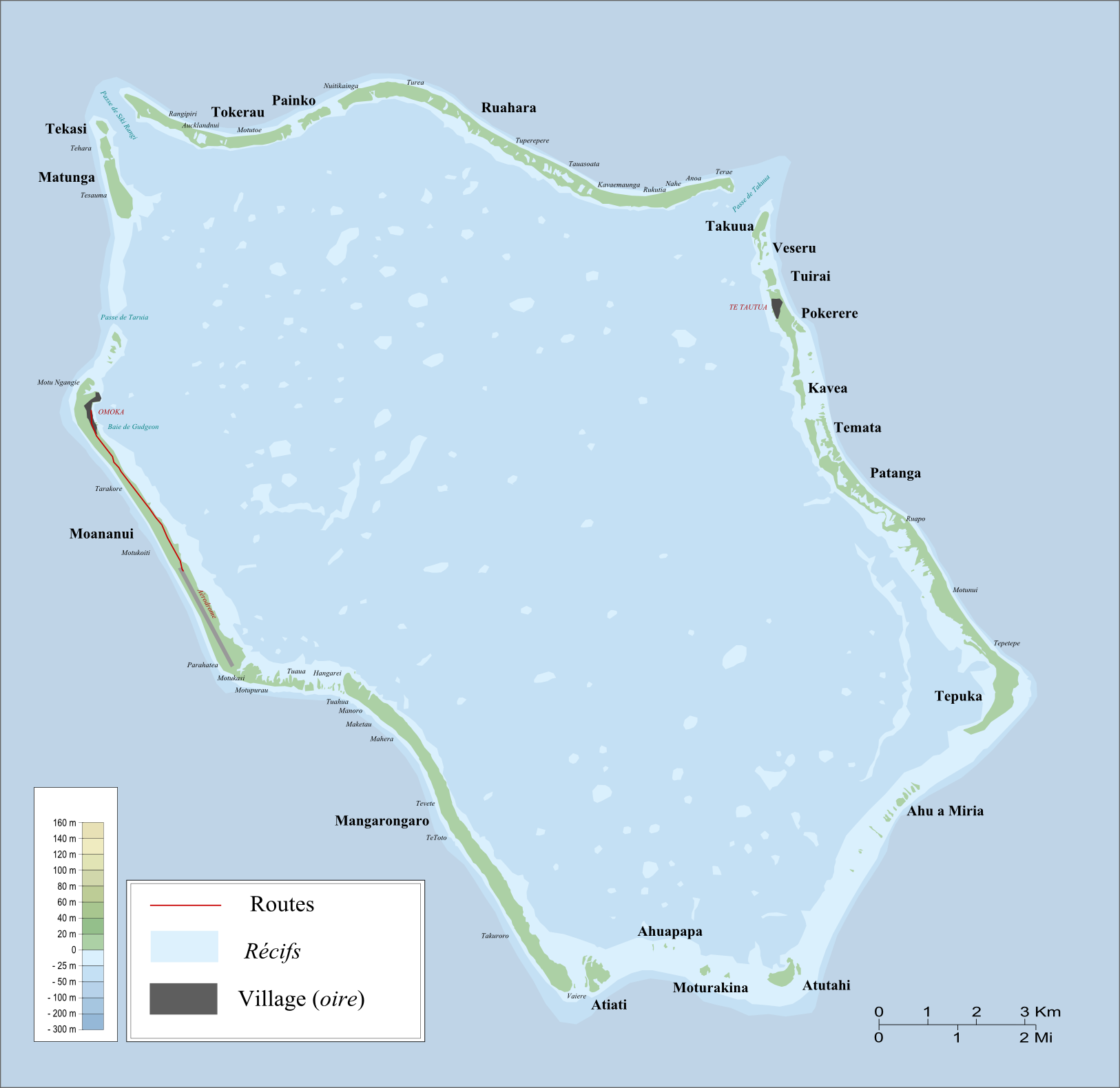
Map of Penrhyn Atoll

Patanga is an islet in Penrhyn Atoll (Tongareva) in the Cook Islands, in the South Pacific Ocean. Patanga is on the eastern edge of the atoll, between Tepuka and Temata.
