= Veseru =

Coordinates: 8°56′48.68″S 157°55′44.16″W

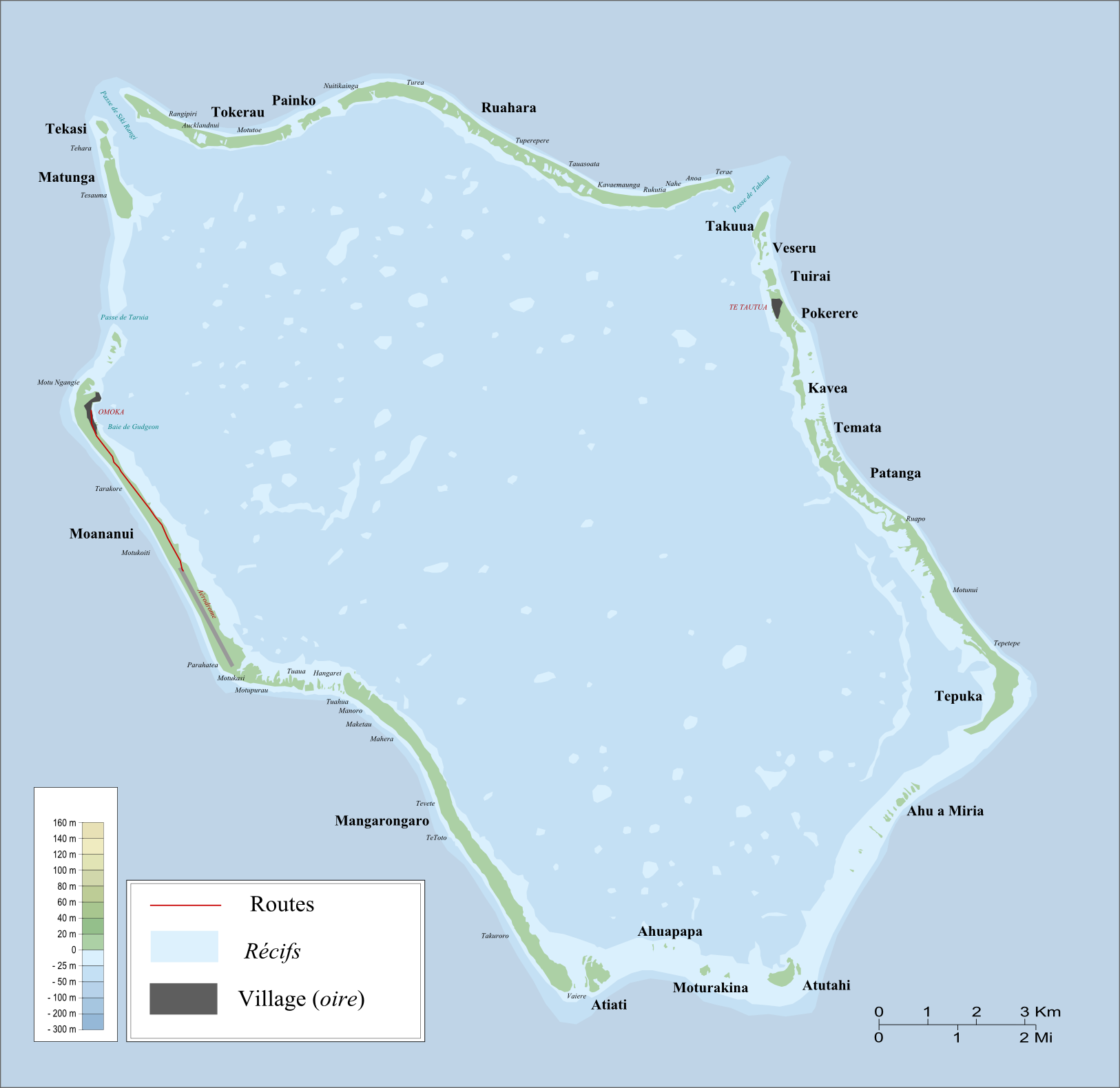
Map of Penrhyn Atoll

Veseru is an islet in Penrhyn Atoll (Tongareva) in the Cook Islands, in the South Pacific Ocean. It is on the eastern edge of the atoll, between Tuirai and Takuua. The island was once inhabited and contains a marae, Arahura.
