= Temata (Penrhyn) =

Coordinates: 8°58′56.39″S 157°55′9.33″W

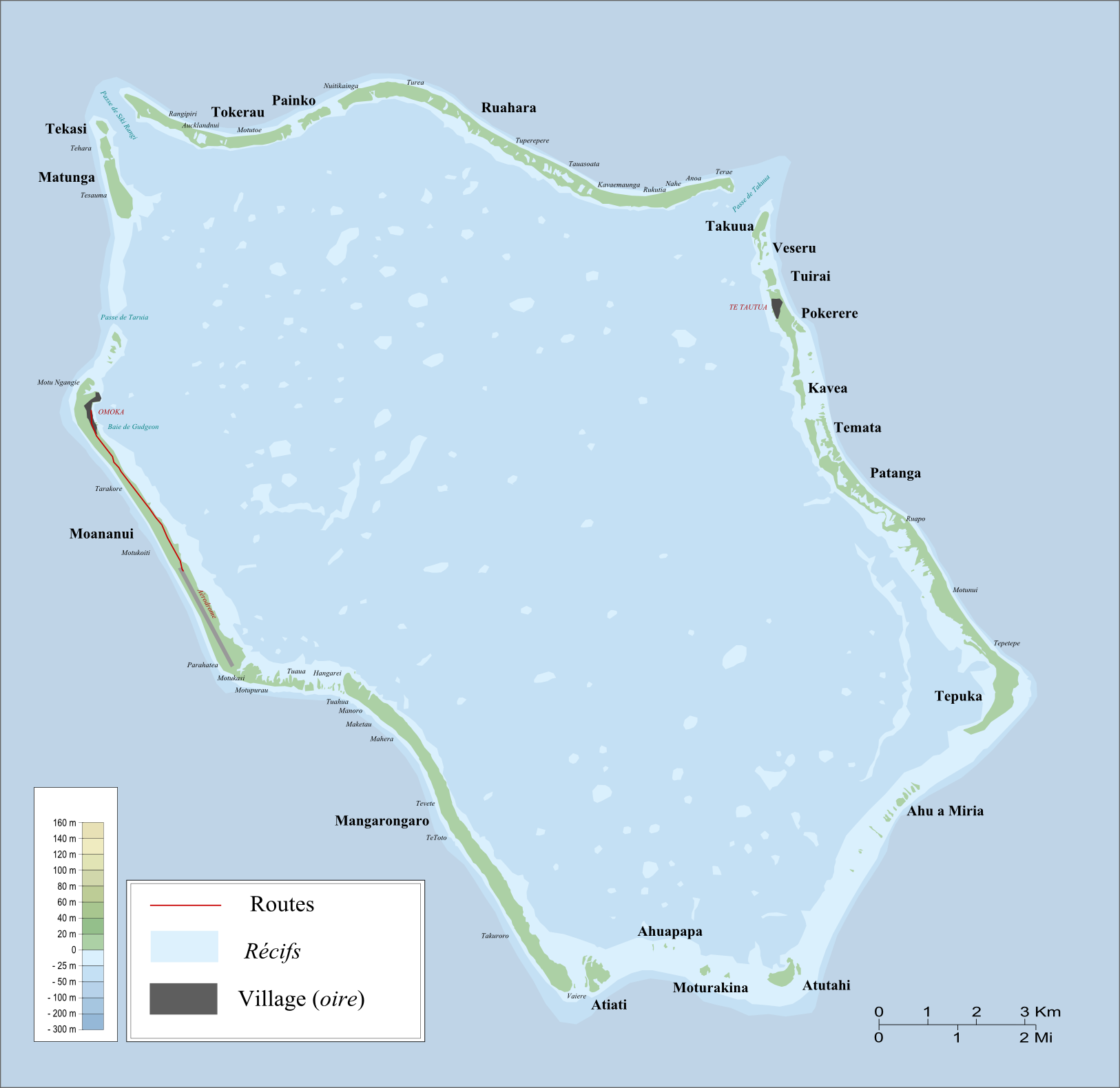
Map of Penrhyn Atoll

Temata is an islet in Penrhyn Atoll (Tongareva) in the Cook Islands. Temata lies on the eastern edge of the atoll, between Patanga and Kavea.
