= Ruahara =

Coordinates: 8°55′50.84″S 157°58′16.79″W

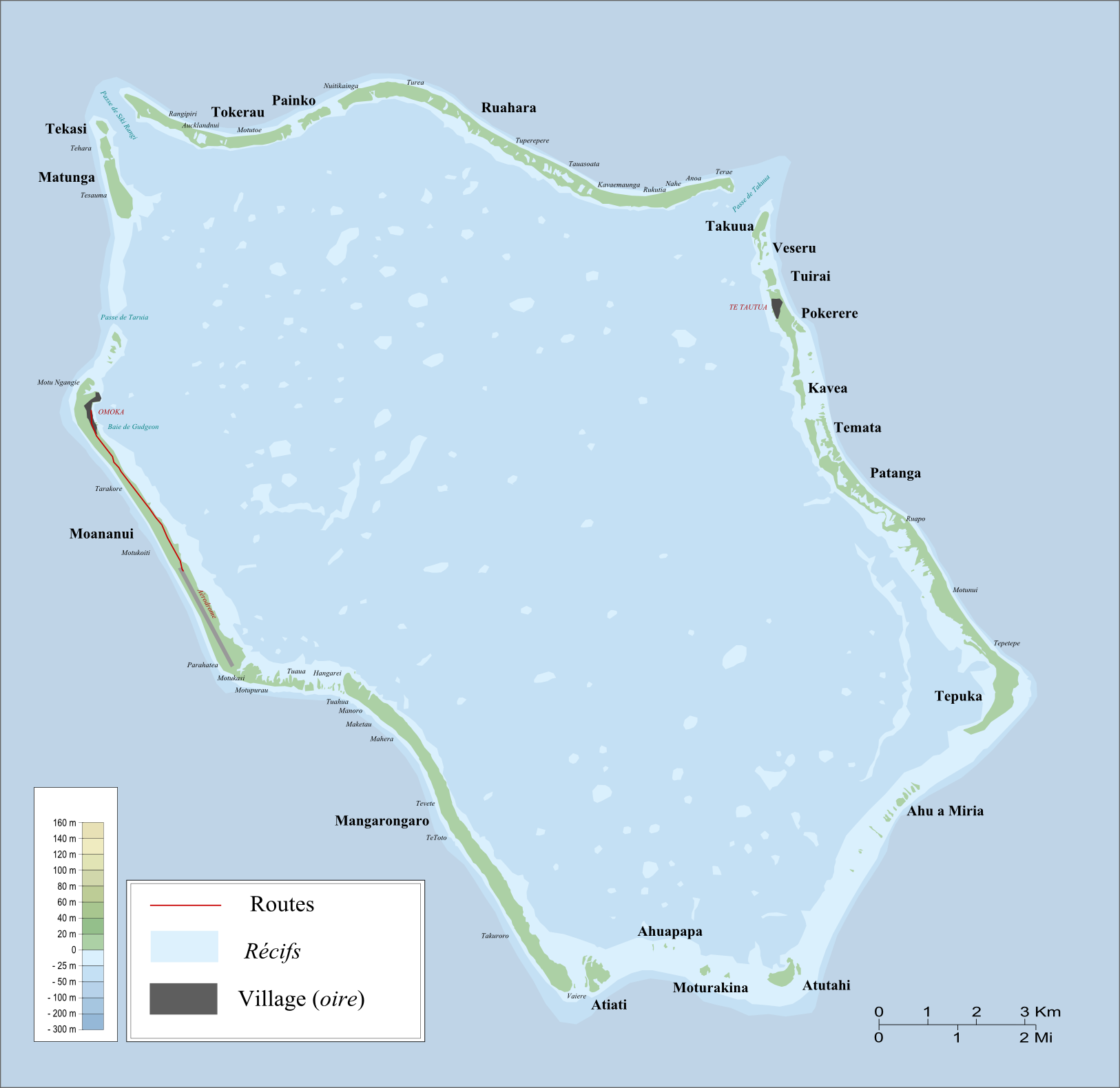
Map of Penrhyn Atoll

Ruahara is an islet in Penrhyn Atoll (Tongareva) in the Cook Islands, in the South Pacific Ocean. Ruahara is on the northern edge of the atoll, between Takuua and Painko. The island was once inhabited and contains two marae, Te Tohi and Sivalau.
