= Matunga (Penrhyn) =

Coordinates: 8°56′11.71″S 158°2′54.2″W

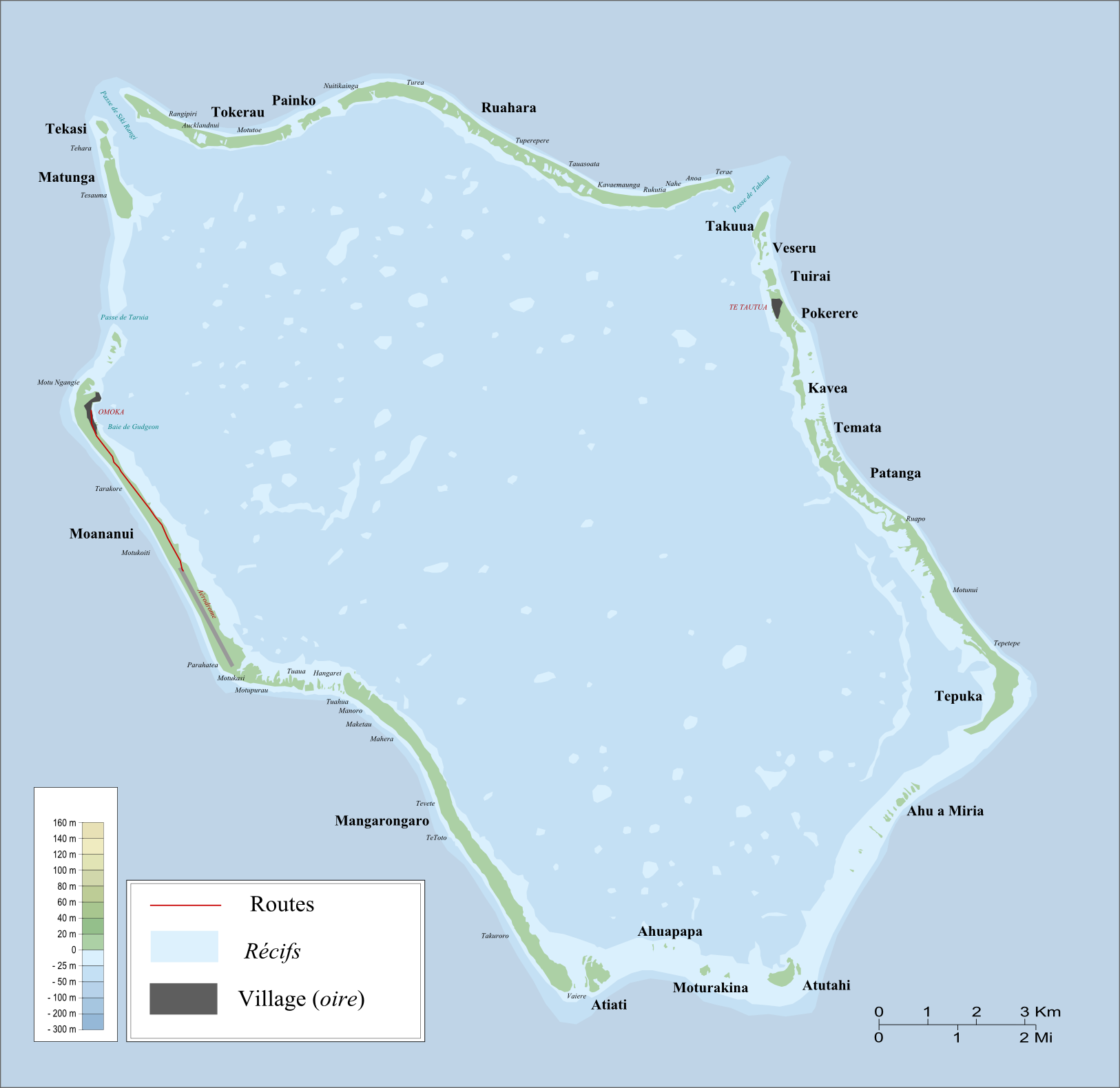
Map of Penrhyn Atoll

Matunga, also known as Morokai, is an islet in Penrhyn Atoll (Tongareva) in the Cook Islands, in the South Pacific Ocean. The islet is in the northwest of the atoll, just south of Tekasi. Matunga contains the ruins of a marae, Kirihuri, as well as a ruined church. It was one of the missionary villages depopulated by Peruvian slavers.

In 1890 after an outbreak of leprosy the island was used as a leper colony and was renamed "morokai". The remaining lepers were evacuated to Fiji in 1929.
