= Ahu a Miria =

Islet in Penrhyn Atoll in the Cook Islands

Coordinates: 9°3′1.65″S 157°54′14.29″W

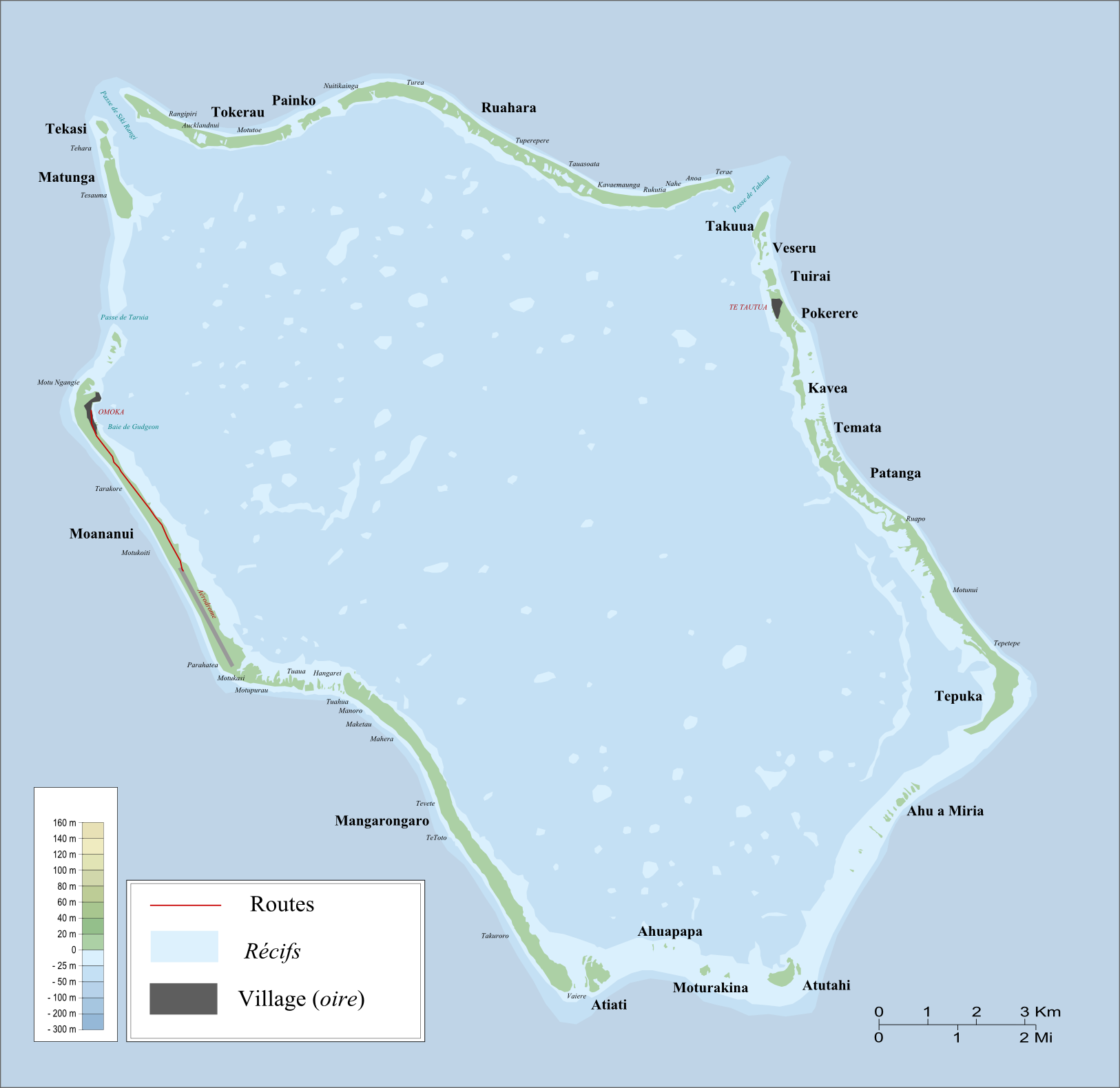
Map of Penrhyn Atoll

Ahu a Miria is an islet in Penrhyn Atoll (Tongareva) in the Cook Islands. It lies on the south-eastern edge of the atoll, between Atutahi and Tepuka.
