= Tekasi =

Islet

Coordinates: 8°55′29.09″S 158°3′4.4″W

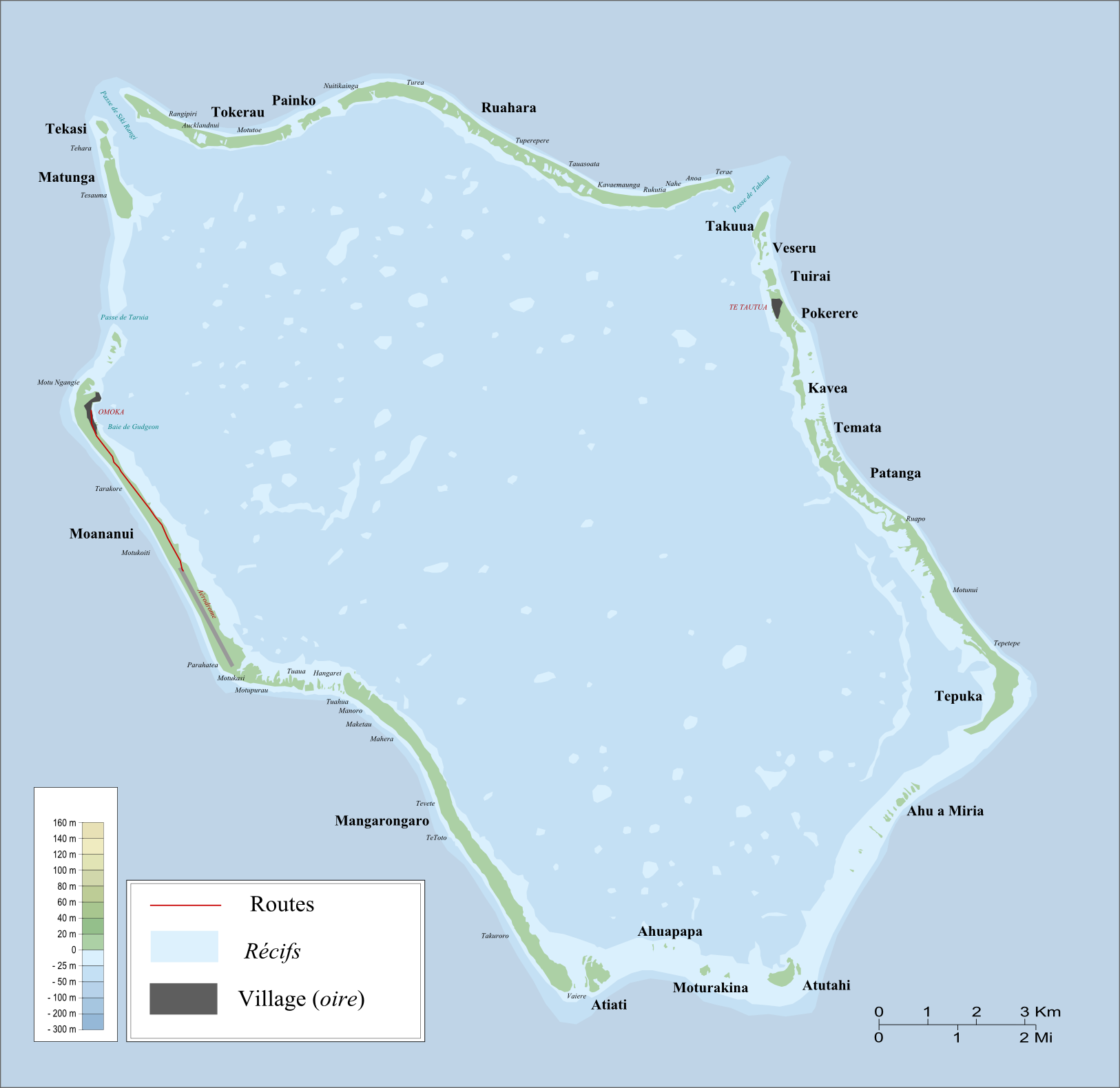
Map of Penrhyn Atoll, with Pokerekere (Pokerere) shown in the east

Tekasi is an islet in Penrhyn Atoll (Tongareva) in the Cook Islands, in the South Pacific Ocean. It is located on the north-west edge of the atoll, next to the northwest passage into the lagoon and north of Matunga. The island was once a camping place for fishermen.

The islet is uninhabited.
