= Moananui Islet =

Coordinates: 8°59′S 158°04′W

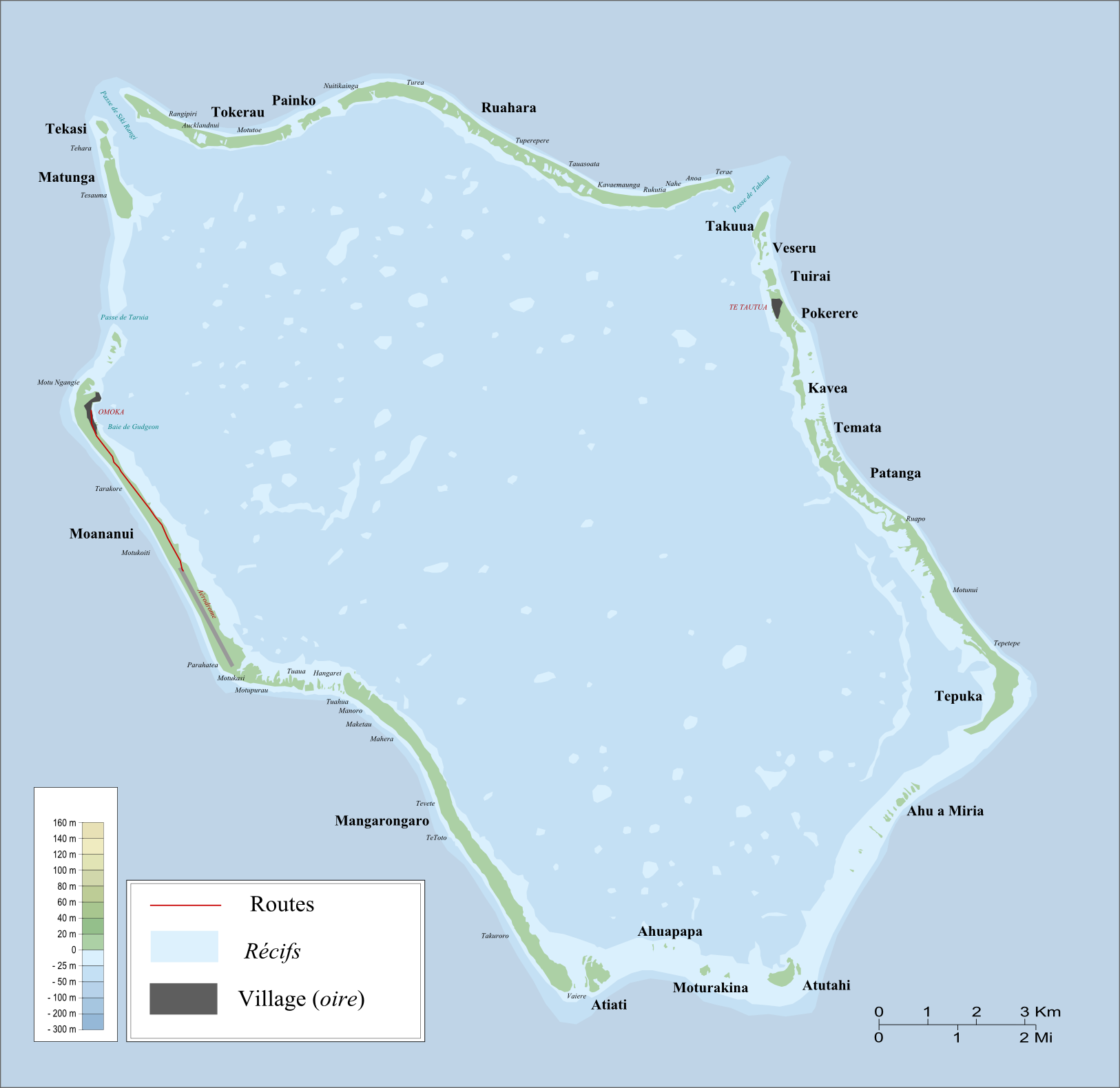
Map of Penrhyn Atoll, with Moananui shown in the west

Moananui Islet is an islet in Penrhyn Atoll (Tongareva) in the Cook Islands, in the South Pacific Ocean.

The main village of the atoll, Omoka, is situated on Moananui Islet. Tongareva Airport is on this island.
