= Teremoana Tapi Taio =

Cook Islands politician (1945–2024)

Teremoana Tapi Taio (28 January 1945 – 3 June 2024) was a Cook Islands politician and Cabinet Minister. He was a member of the Cook Islands Democratic Party.

== Life and career ==
Taio was elected to the Cook Islands Parliament for the electorate of Akaoa at the 1999 election. He served in the cabinet of Robert Woonton, and was responsible for the Finance portfolio following the resignation of Deputy Prime Minister Terepai Maoate from the Cabinet in 2003. He lost his seat at the 2004 election, and did not contest it in 2006 for family reasons.

Taio was managing director of Taio Shipping. He was appointed a director of the Cook Islands Investment Corporation in 2003. He was partly of Norwegian descent.

In September 2010, he resigned from the Cook Islands Investment Corporation board in order to stand for election. He ran for the seat of Akaoa in the 2010 elections, but was unsuccessful.

Taio died on 3 June 2024, at the age of 79.
