= Atiati =

Coordinates: 9°4′59.41″S 157°57′38.5″W

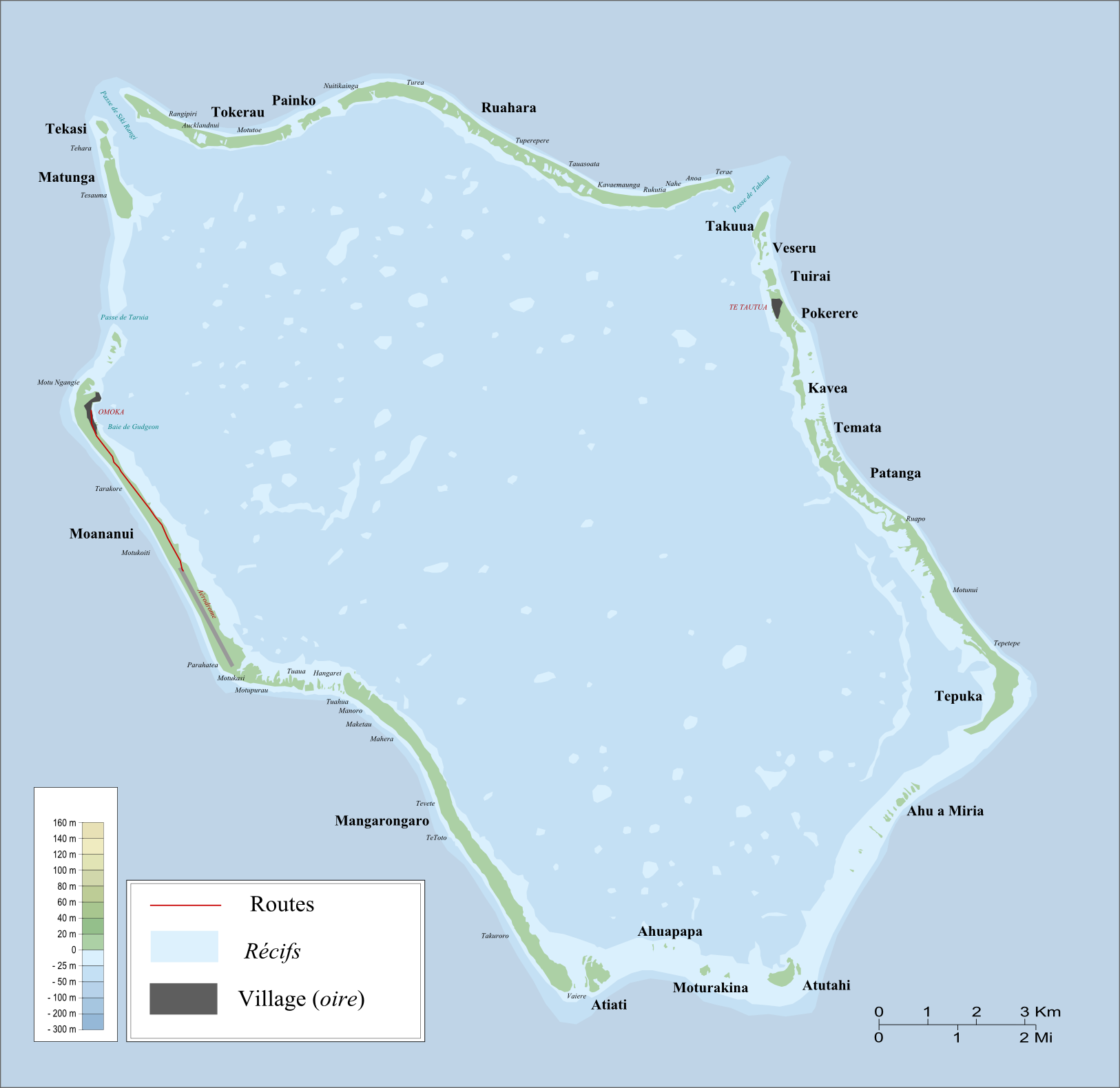
Map of Penrhyn Atoll

Atiati is an islet in Penrhyn Atoll (Tongareva) in the Cook Islands, in the South Pacific Ocean. Atiati marks the southwestern boundary of the atoll and is east of Mangarongaro.
