= Mangere (Cook Islands) =

Island of the Cook Islands

Coordinates: 18.8684°S 159.7502°W

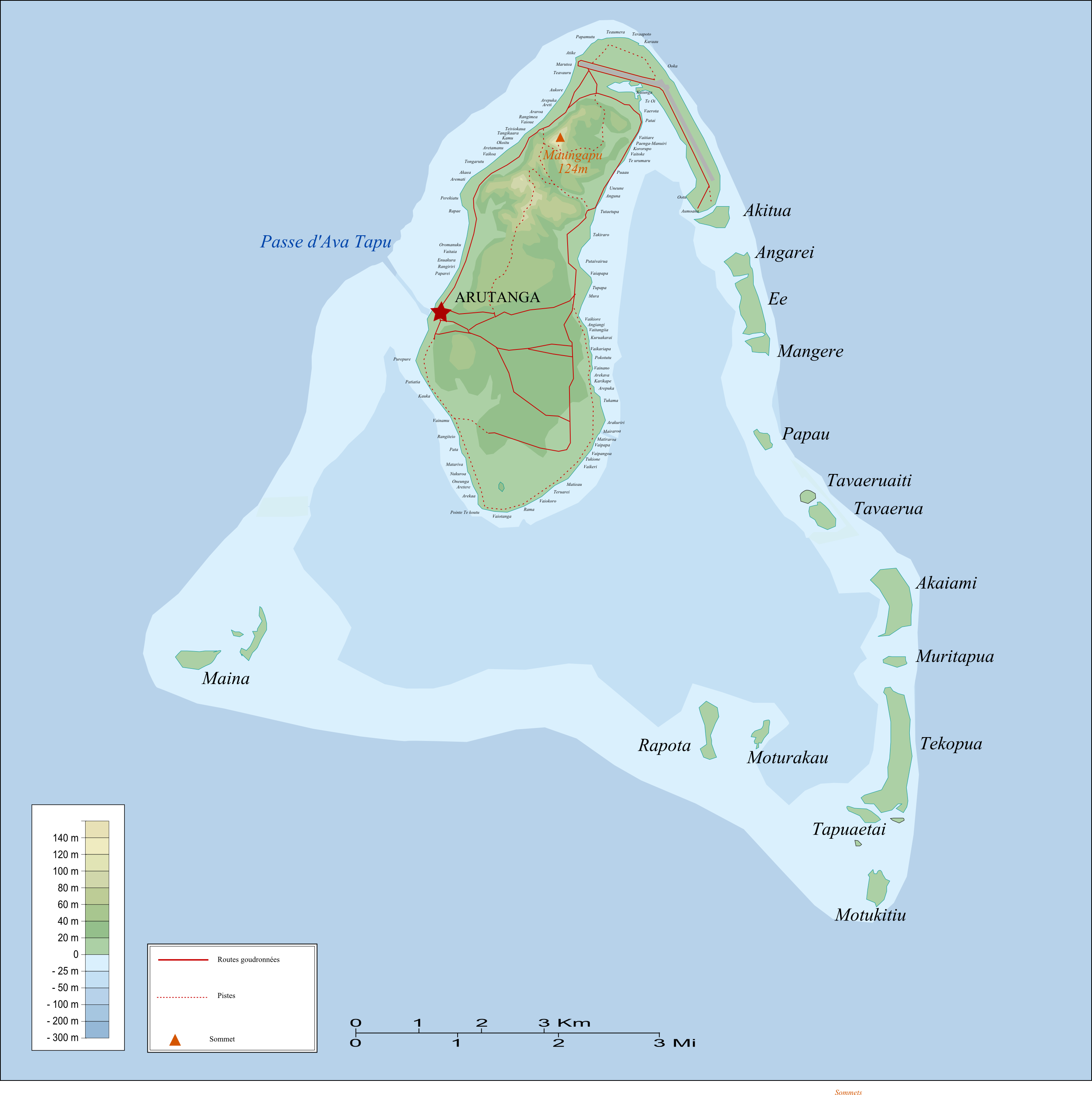
Topographic map of Aitutaki

Mangere is one of 22 islands in the Aitutaki atoll of the Cook Islands. It is located on the northeastern perimeter of Aitutaki Lagoon to the south of the larger island of Ee, three kilometres (1.9 mi) to the east of the main island of Aitutaki. The island is 350 metres (1,150 ft) across.
