= Angarei =

Island of the Cook Islands

Coordinates: 18.8571°S 159.7534°W

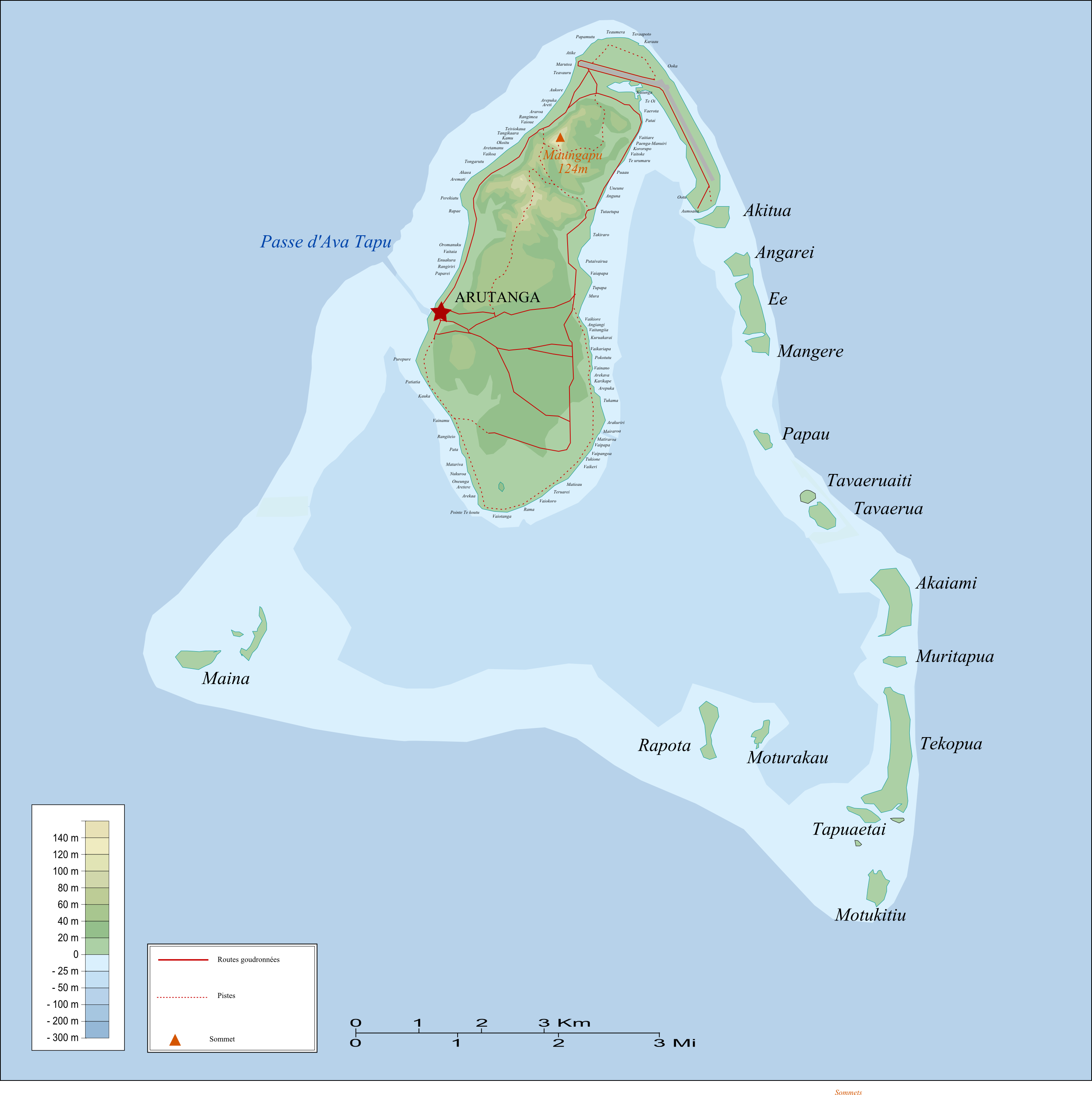
Topographic map of Aitutaki

Angarei is one of 22 islands in the Aitutaki atoll of the Cook Islands. It is located on the northeastern perimeter of Aitutaki Lagoon to the north of the larger island of Ee, three kilometres (1.9 mi) to the east of the main island of Aitutaki. The island is 480 metres (1,570 ft) long by 400 metres (1,300 ft) wide.
