= Ee (island) =

Coordinates: 18.8634°S 159.7518°W

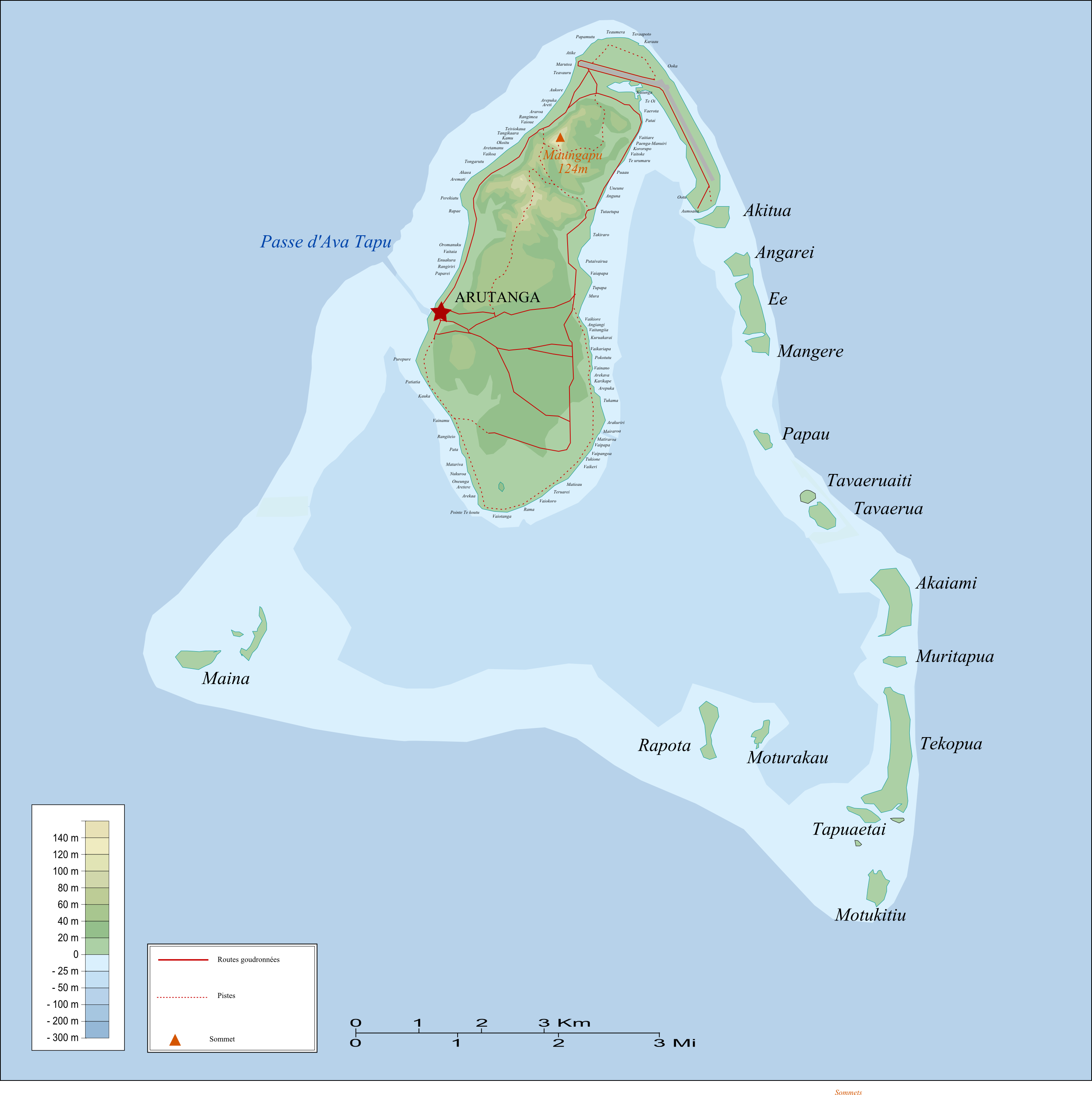
Topographic map of Aitutaki

Ee is one of 22 islands in the Aitutaki atoll of the Cook Islands. Located between the smaller islands of Angarei and Mangere, it is the third largest of the Aitutaki motus, after Tekopua and Akaiami, and measures 975 metres (3,199 ft) long and up to 410 metres (1,350 ft) wide.
