= Tavaeruaiti =

Island of the Cook Islands

Coordinates: 18.8911°S 159.7429°W

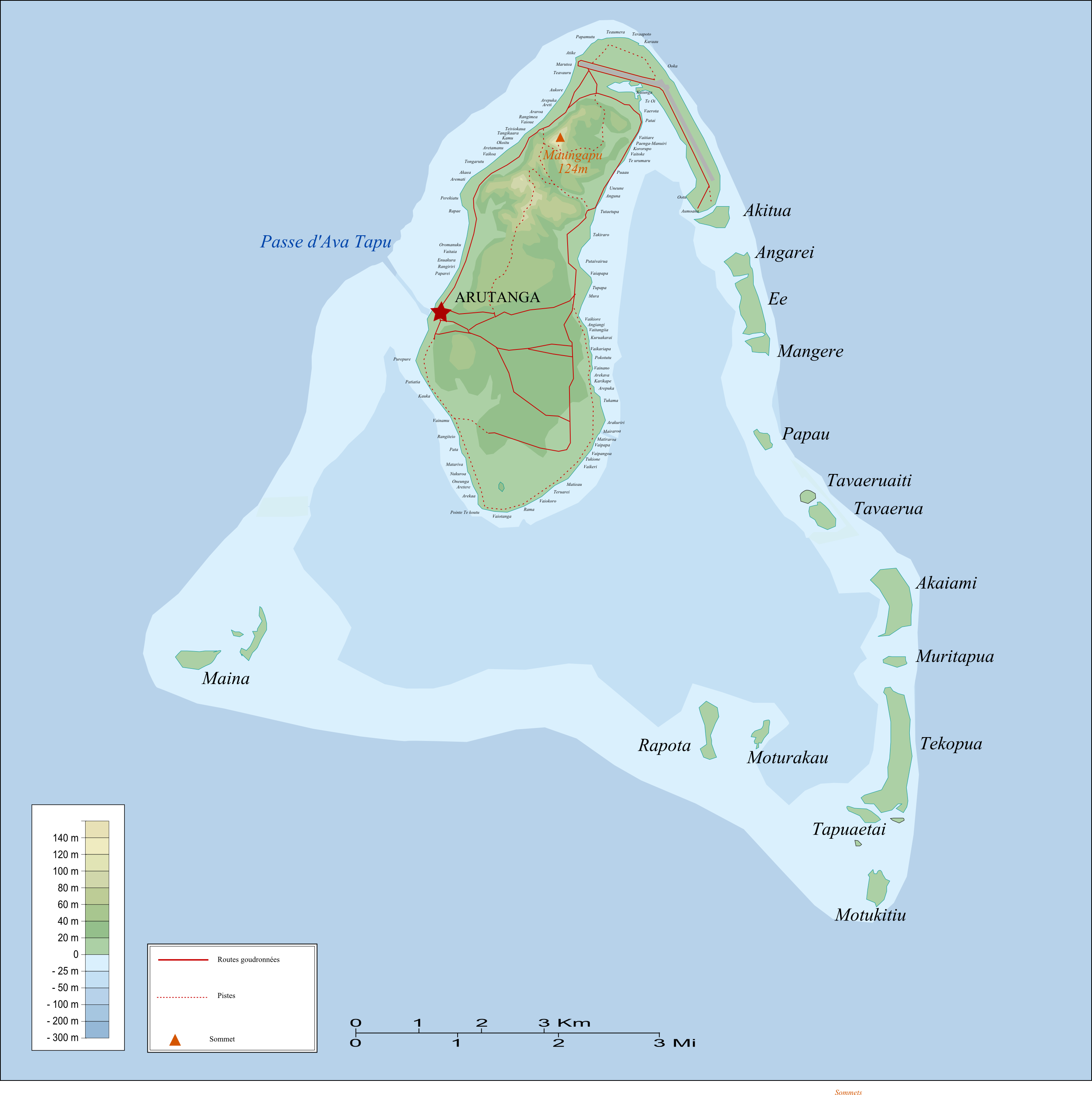
Topographic map of Aitutaki

Tavaeruaiti is one of 22 islands in the Aitutaki atoll of the Cook Islands. It is located on the eastern perimeter of Aitutaki Lagoon to the north of the larger island of Tavaerua (Tavaeruaiti means "Little Tavaerua"), four kilometres (2.5 mi) to the east of the main island of Aitutaki. The island is 250 metres (820 ft) long and 210 metres (690 ft) wide.
