= Tavaerua =

Island in the Cook Islands

Coordinates: 18.894°S 159.741°W

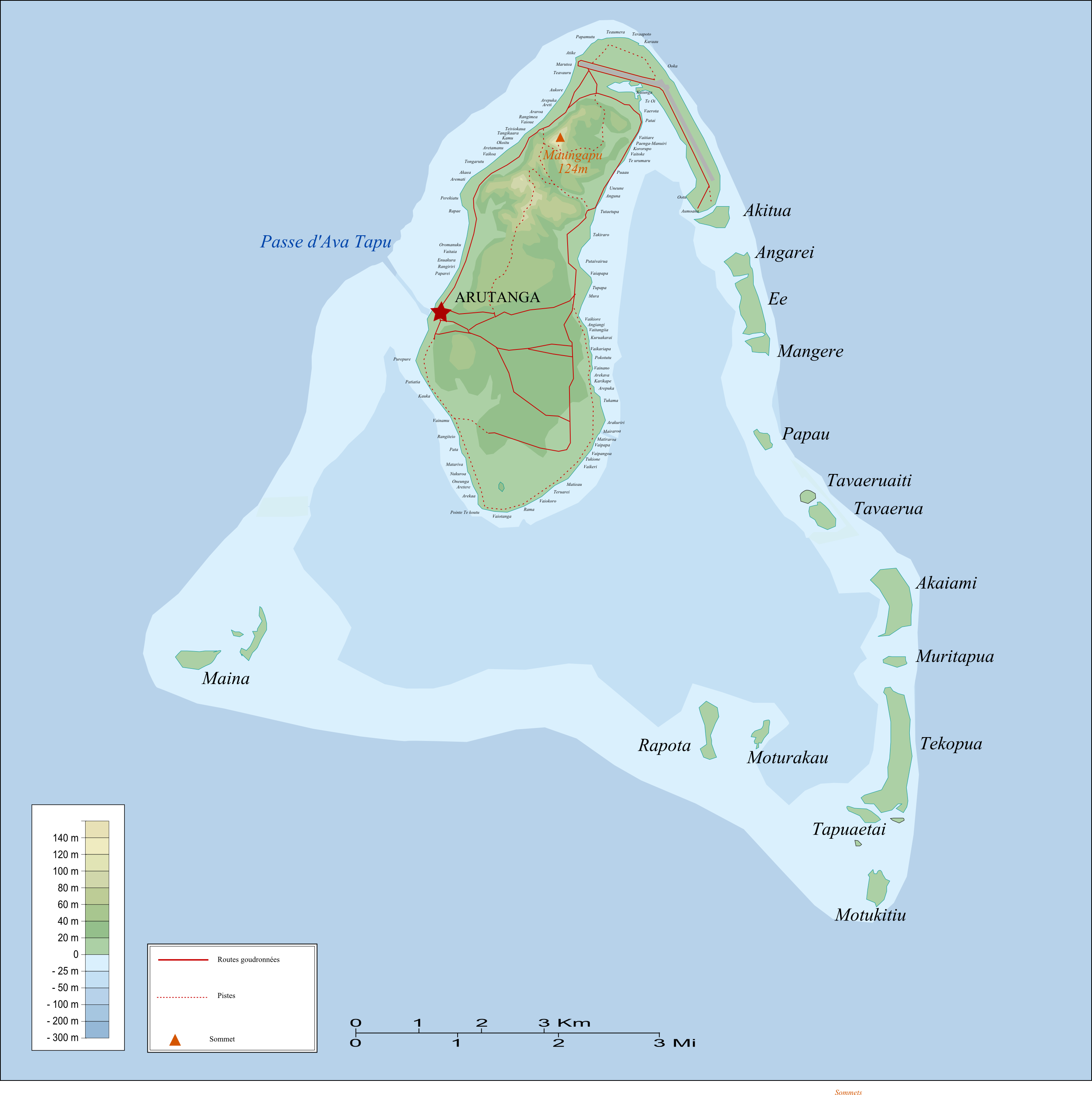
Topographic map of Aitutaki

Tavaerua is one of 22 islands in the Aitutaki atoll of the Cook Islands. It is located on the eastern perimeter of Aitutaki Lagoon to the south of the smaller island of Tavaeruaiti, four kilometres (2.5 mi) to the east of the main island of Aitutaki. The island is 290 metres (950 ft) wide and 500 metres (1,600 ft) long and has an elevation of 7 metres (23 ft) above sea level.
