= 17th Cook Islands Parliament =

2018 term

17th Parliament of the Cook Islands
←	16th Parliament	18th Parliament	→
- Parliament House, Avarua

Overview
- Legislative body: Parliament of the Cook Islands
- Election: 2018 general election
- Government: Fourth Cook Islands Party Government
- Website: parliament.gov.ck

House of Representatives
- Members: 24
- Speaker of the House: Tai Tura — Niki Rattle until 15 February 2021
- Prime Minister: Mark Brown — Henry Puna until 1 October 2020
- Leader of the Opposition: Tina Browne

House of Ariki
- Members: 24
- President of the House of Ariki: Tou Travel Ariki

Sovereign
- Monarch: Elizabeth II
- King's Representative: Tom Marsters

The 17th Cook Islands Parliament is a previous term of the Parliament of the Cook Islands. Its composition was determined by the 2018 elections on 14 June 2018.

== Officeholders ==
=== Presiding officers ===
- Speaker of the House:
  - Tai Tura (Cook Islands Party) from March 2021
  - Niki Rattle until 15 February 2021
- Deputy Speaker of the House:
  - Tai Tura (Cook Islands Party) from April 2019 until March 2021

==== Other parliamentary officers ====
- Clerk:
  - Tangata Vainerere, from April 2021
  - Jeannine Daniel, acting clerk from March 2020 until April 2021
  - Tangata Vainerere, from October 2018 until March 2020
  - Helen Maunga, acting clerk from August 2018 to October 2018
  - Pastor John Tangi, until 1 August 2018
- Deputy Clerk:
  - Tai Manavaroa, from April 2021
  - Jeannine Daniel, from November 2019 until March 2020
  - Helen Maunga, until November 2019

=== Party leaders ===
- Prime Minister:
  - Hon. Mark Brown (Cook Islands Party) from 1 October 2020
  - Hon. Henry Puna (Cook Islands Party) until 1 October 2020
- Deputy Prime Minister:
  - Hon. Robert Tapaitau (Independent) from 1 October 2020
  - Hon. Mark Brown (Cook Islands Party) until 1 October 2020
- Leader of the Opposition: Tina Browne (Democratic Party)

== Members ==
=== Initial party standings ===
Party	Votes	%	Seats	+/–
Democratic Party			11	+2
Cook Islands Party			10	–3
One Cook Islands Movement			1	–1
Titikaveka Oire	83		0	0
Independents			2	+2
Invalid/blank votes		–	–	–
Total			24	0
Registered voters/turnout	10,917		–	–
Source: Radio NZ Justice minister

=== Initial MPs ===
Name	Party	Electorate	Term
George Angene	OCI	Tupapa–Maraerenga	Third
Patrick Arioka	CIP	Murienua	First
Anthony Toruariki Armstrong	DP	Ivirua	First
Nooroa o Teariki Baker	DP	Akaoa	First
Mark Brown	CIP	Takuvaine–Tutakimoa	Third
Te-Hani Brown	DP	Tengatangi–Areora–Ngatiarua	First
Tingika Elikana	CIP	Pukapuka–Nassau	First
Toka Hagai	CIP	Rakahanga	Second
William (Smiley) Heather	DP	Ruaau	Second
Wesley Kareroa	DP	Oneroa	Second
Tereapii Maki-Kavana	CIP	Arutanga–Reureu–Nikaupara	First
Terepai Maoate Jnr	DP	Amuri–Ureia	Third
Tetangi Matapo	DP	Tamarua	Third
Vaine Mokoroa	CIP	Nikao–Panama	First
Selina Napa	DP	Titikaveka	Third
Albert Nicholas	CIP	Avatiu–Ruatonga–Palmerston	Second
Henry Puna	CIP	Manihiki	Fourth
Tuakeu Tangatapoto	CIP	Mitiaro	First
Robert Tapaitau	Ind	Penrhyn	First
Kitai Teinakore	DP	Vaipae–Tautu	First
Rose Toki-Brown	Ind	Teenui–Mapumai	Second
Tamaiva Tuavera	DP	Ngatangiia	Second
Vaitoti Tupa	DP	Matavera	First
Tai Tura	CIP	Mauke	Third

=== Summary of changes ===
- Toka Hagai resigned on 1 November 2018 after allegations of treating. In December 2018 the Court of Appeal ruled that Tina Browne had won the seat.
- Tony Armstrong died in November 2018. A by-election for the vacant Ivirua seat was held on 21 January 2019, and was won by Agnes Armstrong.
- Te-Hani Brown resigned from the Democratic party to support the government in January 2019. She was subsequently re-elected in a by-election.
- Henry Puna resigned on 24 March 2021 to take up the position of Secretary General of the Pacific Islands Forum Secretariat. Akaiti Puna was elected in the resulting by-election.
