= 18th Cook Islands Parliament =

2022 term

18th Parliament of the Cook Islands
←	17th Parliament	19th Parliament	→
- Parliament House, Avarua

Overview
- Legislative body: Parliament of the Cook Islands
- Term: 21 March 2023 – 25 June 2026
- Election: 2022 general election
- Government: Fourth Cook Islands Party Government
- Website: parliament.gov.ck

House of Representatives
- Members: 24
- Speaker of the House: Tai Tura
- Leader of the House: Akaiti Puna
- Prime Minister: Mark Brown
- Leader of the Opposition: Tina Browne

House of Ariki
- Members: 24
- President of the House of Ariki: Tou Travel Ariki

Sovereign
- Monarch: Charles III — Elizabeth II until 8 September 2022
- King's Representative: Tom Marsters

The 18th Cook Islands Parliament was the previous term of the Parliament of the Cook Islands. Its composition was determined by the 2022 elections on 1 August 2022. The opening of parliament was delayed by over 7 months due to petitions over the election results. The 18th parliament finally opened on 21 March 2023, and was dissolved on 25 July 2026.

== Officeholders ==
=== Presiding officers ===
- Speaker of the House: Tai Tura (Cook Islands Party)
- Deputy Speaker of the House: Tuakeu Tangatapoto (Cook Islands Party)

==== Other parliamentary officers ====
- Clerk: Tangata Vainerere
- Deputy Clerk: Tai Manavaroa

=== Party leaders ===
- Prime Minister: Hon. Mark Brown (Cook Islands Party)
- Deputy Prime Minister:
  - Hon. Albert Nicholas (Cook Islands Party) from 16 February 2024
  - Hon. Robert Tapaitau (Independent) until 31 January 2024
- Leader of the Opposition: Tina Browne (Democratic Party)
- Leader of the Cook Islands United Party: Teariki Heather

=== Floor leaders ===
- Leader of the House: Akaiti Puna (Cook Islands Party)

=== Whips ===
- Government Whip: Sonny Williams (Cook Islands Party)

== Members ==
=== Initial party standings ===
Party	Votes	%	+/–	Seats	+/–
Cook Islands Party	3,890	44.07	+1.77	12	+2
Democratic Party	2,377	26.93	-14.98	5	–6
Cook Islands United Party	1,660	18.81	New	3	New
One Cook Islands Movement	237	2.68	-8.13	1	0
Progressive Party of the Cook Islands	18	0.20	New	0	New
Independents	645	7.31	+3.54	3	+1
Total	8,827	100.00	–	24	0
Source: Parliament of the Cook Islands

=== Initial MPs ===
Name	Party	Electorate	Term
Tukaka Ama	Cook Islands Party	Ngatangiia	First
George Angene	Cook Islands Party	Tupapa–Maraerenga	Fourth
Agnes Armstrong	Democratic Party	Ivirua	Second
Mark Brown	Cook Islands Party	Takuvaine–Tutakimoa	Fourth
Te-Hani Brown	Independent	Tengatangi–Areora–Ngatiarua	Second
Tina Browne	Democratic Party	Rakahanga	Second
Tingika Elikana	Cook Islands Party	Pukapuka–Nassau	Second
Robert Stanley Heather	Cook Islands United Party	Akaoa	First
Teariki Heather	Cook Islands United Party	Murienua	Fifth
Teokotai Herman	Cook Islands Party	Vaipae–Tautu	First
Toanui Isamaela	One Cook Islands	Amuri–Ureia	Third
Wesley Kareroa	Democratic Party	Oneroa	Third
Tereapii Maki-Kavana	Cook Islands Party	Arutanga–Reureu–Nikaupara	Second
Stephen Matapo	Independent	Mauke	First
Tetangi Matapo	Democratic Party	Tamarua	Fourth
Vaine Mokoroa	Cook Islands Party	Nikao–Panama	Second
Albert Nicholas	Cook Islands Party	Avatiu–Ruatonga–Palmerston	Third
Akaiti Puna	Cook Islands Party	Manihiki	Second
Tuakeu Tangatapoto	Cook Islands Party	Mitiaro	Second
Rose Toki-Brown	Independent	Teenui–Mapumai	Third
Robert Tapaitau	Cook Islands Party	Penrhyn	Second
Vaitoti Tupa	Democratic Party	Matavera	Second
Timi Varu	Cook Islands United Party	Ruaau	First
Sonny Williams	Cook Islands Party	Titikaveka	First

=== Summary of changes ===
- Independent MP Stephen Matapo joined the Cook Islands Party on 25 August 2022.
- The Penrhyn seat became vacant due to Robert Tapaitau's conviction. A by-election was held and Sarakura Tapaitau was elected on 12 March 2024.

== Committees ==
The 18th Parliament has 3 standing committees, 2 select committees and 3 specialist committees:

Committee	Chairperson	Deputy chairperson	Government–Opposition divide
Standing committees
Business Committee	Tai Tura (CIP)	Tuakeu Tangatapoto (CIP)	4–3
Privileges Committee	Tingika Elikana (CIP)		4-3
Standing Orders Committee	Tai Tura (CIP)	Tuakeu Tangatapoto (CIP)	4-3
Select committees
Public Accounts Committee	Teokotai Herman (CIP)	Vaitoti Tupa (Demo)	4-3
Bills, Petitions and Papers Committee	Akaiti Puna (CIP)	Tina Pupuke-Browne (Demo)	4–3
Special committees
Constitutional Review Special Committee	Tingika Elikana (CIP)	Tina Pupuke-Browne (Demo)	3–4
Tainted Cryptocurrency Recovery Bill Special Committee	Tukaka Ama (CIP)	Vaitoti Tupa (Demo)	3–4
Religious Organisation Special Select Committee	Tingika Elikana (CIP)	Tina Pupuke-Browne (Demo)	3–4
