= 2016 Arutanga-Reureu-Nikaupara by-election =

Election in the Cook Islands

A by-election will be held in the Cook Islands constituency of Arutanga-Reureu-Nikaupara on 13 October 2016. The by-election was called after One Cook Islands Movement leader Teina Bishop was convicted of corruption as a Minister in July 2016.

The by-election was won by One Cook Islands candidate Pumati Israela.

== Results ==
Candidate	Party	Votes	%
Pumati Israela	One Cook Islands Movement	191	53.65
Tereapii Maki-Kavana	Cook Islands Party	165	46.35
Total		356	100.00
