= Pumati Israela =

Cook Islands politician

Member of the Cook Islands Parliament for Arutanga–Reureu–Nikaupara
- In office 13 October 2016 – 14 June 2018
- Preceded by: Teina Bishop
- Succeeded by: Tereapii Maki-Kavana

Personal details
- Party: One Cook Islands Movement

Pumati Israela is a Cook Islands politician and former member of the Cook Islands Parliament. He is a member of the One Cook Islands Movement.

Israela served as Aitutaki infrastructure manager from 1989 to 2016 and Mayor of Aitutaki from 1992 to 1995. He was first elected to Parliament in the 2016 Arutanga-Reureu-Nikaupara by-election following the conviction of One Cook Islands leader Teina Bishop for corruption. He was formally sworn in as an MP in June 2017. He was not re-elected at the 2018 election.
