= 2022 Cook Islands medical cannabis referendum =

Cook Islands vote on the legalisation of Medical cannabis

Cook Islands medical cannabis referendum
- 1 August 2022
- Should we review our cannabis laws to allow for research and medicinal use?

Results
Yes	62%
No	35%
Informal	3%

A referendum took place in the Cook Islands on 1 August 2022. Voters were called upon by the government of Prime Minister Mark Brown to decide on the legalisation of medical cannabis. The referendum results are non-binding, with the Parliament elected on the same day being free to implement the policy or not.

A majority of participating voters supported legalisation, with 62% voting yes, 35% voting no, and 3% informal.
