= List of international prime ministerial trips made by Mark Brown (Cook Islands) =

Mark Brown, 12th Prime Minister of the Cook Islands, has made 20 international trips to numerous countries during his premiership, which began on 1 October 2020.

== Summary ==
The number of visits per country where Prime Minister Brown travelled are:

- One visit to Australia, Germany, Indonesia, Japan, Palau, Papua New Guinea, Solomon Islands, South Korea, Tonga, Tuvalu, Uzbekistan and the United Kingdom
- Two visits to China and Fiji
- Three visits to New Zealand
- Four visits to the United States

== 2022 ==
#	Country	Location	Date	Details	Image
1	United Kingdom	London	17 September	Brown signed the book of condolence for Queen Elizabeth II.	
2	United States	Washington, D.C.	28–29 September	Attended the United States–Pacific Island Country Summit at White House.	

== 2023 ==
#	Country	Location	Date	Details	Image
1	Japan	Hiroshima	18–21 May	Brown travelled to Hiroshima to attend the G7 summit.	
1	Papua New Guinea	Port Moresby	22 May	Brown attended a US-Pacific Summit and held bilateral meetings with New Zealander Prime Minister Chris Hipkins, US Secretary of State Antony Blinken and Indian Prime Minister Narendra Modi.	
2	South Korea	Seoul	29–30 May	Attended the Korea–Pacific Islands Summit.	
3	Indonesia	Jakarta	6-7 September	Attended the Eighteenth East Asia Summit.	
4	United States	Washington, D. C.	25 September	Attended the US–Pacific Island Country Summit.	
5	Germany	Bonn	2–5 October	Brown attended the Green Climate Fund (GCF) Pledging Conference in Bonn, which sought to secure funding for climate action in developing countries. The visit followed his attendance at the Underwater Minerals Conference in Rotterdam, Netherlands.	

== 2024 ==
#	Country	Location	Date	Details
1	Tonga	Nuku'alofa, Vava'u	28–29 August	Brown attended the 53rd Pacific Islands Forum Leaders Meeting.

== 2025 ==
#	Country	Location	Date	Details
1	China	Harbin	10–14 February	Brown discusses marine, climate and economics during his visit. Met with Premier Li Qiang.
2	Australia	Sydney, Brisbane, the Gold Coast, and Melbourne	29 May – 6 June	Brown led an 11-member national delegation to Australia from May 29 to June 6. The tour included a series of high-level diaspora and policy consultations across several major cities, including Sydney, Brisbane, the Gold Coast, and Melbourne. The primary focus of the visit was to conduct public dialogues regarding the Cook Islands' exploratory seabed minerals strategy, emphasizing environmental stewardship, regulatory frameworks, and scientific research.
3	Solomon Islands	Honiara	7–12 September	Brown attended the 54th Pacific Islands Forum meeting.

== 2026 ==
#	Country	Location	Date	Details
1	United States	Honolulu	22–23 February	Brown travelled to Honolulu to attend the Pacific Agenda: Investment, Security, and Shared Prosperity Summit, an invitation-only forum focused on investment, security and economic development in the Pacific.
2	New Zealand	Wellington, Auckland, Ngāruawāhia	16–23 March	Brown undertook a week-long visit to New Zealand focused on relations with the Cook Islands diaspora and the Cook Islands–New Zealand relationship. In Wellington, he delivered a speech marking the 60th anniversary of Cook Islands self-government. He subsequently travelled to Auckland and Ngāruawāhia, where he met with Cook Islanders and attended the 130th Tūrangawaewae Royal Regatta.
3	New Zealand	Wellington	2 April	Brown met with New Zealand Foreign Minister Winston Peters in Wellington, where the two governments signed a defence and security declaration aimed at resolving disagreements over the Cook Islands' foreign-policy arrangements with China. The declaration reaffirmed New Zealand as the Cook Islands' partner of choice on defence and security matters.
4	China	Wuzhou	26–28 May	Brown travelled to Wuzhou for the inauguration of the MV Tuitui Moana, a new inter-island vessel co-funded by the Cook Islands and China. The visit also included high-level discussions on bilateral cooperation and engagement with provincial authorities in Guangxi.
5	New Zealand	Auckland	28 August	Brown attended the inaugural Realm Leaders' Meeting at Government House in Auckland alongside the leaders of New Zealand, Niue and Tokelau. The meeting was held en route to the 55th Pacific Islands Forum Leaders Meeting in Palau.
6	Palau	Koror	31 August–3 September	Brown led the Cook Islands delegation to the 55th Pacific Islands Forum Leaders Meeting. The meeting included discussions on regional security, climate change, maritime issues and economic development. The Cook Islands, New Zealand and the United States also announced funding for an upgrade to the port at Penrhyn (Tongareva).
7	Tuvalu	Funafuti	5–8 October	Brown made his first visit to Tuvalu to attend the Pacific Pre-COP31 meeting. He flew over the Tuvalu Coastal Adaptation Project and met with community members and youth.
7	Fiji	Nadi	5–8 October	Brown addressed the Pre-COP31 Leaders' Plenary, calling for the same urgency on climate finance as on the global fuel crisis and backing a new funding round for the Green Climate Fund. He held meetings with Solomon Islands Prime Minister Matthew Wale and Mauritian President Dharam Gokhool, and spoke with COP31 President Murat Kurum.

== Multilateral meetings ==
Group	Year					
Group	2021	2022	2023	2024	2025	2026
PIF	6 August, (Fiji) Suva	11–14 July,^{[a]} (Fiji) Suva	6–10 November, (Cook Islands) Rarotonga	26–30 August, (Tonga) Nuku'alofa	8–12 September, (Solomon Islands) Honiara	31 August–3 September, (Palau) Koror
██ = Future event ██ = Did not attend / participate.^aMark Brown pulled out to focus on the election.
