= Nooroa o Teariki Baker =

Cook Islands politician

Member of the Cook Islands Parliament for Akaoa
- In office 14 June 2018 – 1 August 2022
- Preceded by: Teariki Heather
- Succeeded by: Robert Stanley Heather

Personal details
- Born: 15 August 1962 (age 64) Rarotonga
- Party: Cook Islands Democratic Party; Cook Islands Party (2026–)

Nooroa o Teariki Baker (born 15 August 1962) is a Cook Islands politician and former member of the Cook Islands Parliament. He is a member of the Cook Islands Democratic Party.

Baker was born in Rarotonga, but left for New Zealand in 1977 at the age of 15. He subsequently trained as an arborist in Australia. He returned to the Cook Islands in 1999 and after a failed effort to become a planter, established a tree-management company.

After running unsuccessfully in the 2014 Cook Islands general election, he was elected to parliament in the 2018 election, defeating both Deputy Prime Minister Teariki Heather and his great-uncle Norman George.

In February 2020 he was appointed Democratic Party spokesperson on Renewable Energy and Transport.

He lost his seat in the 2022 Cook Islands general election. In the 2026 general election he ran unsuccessfully in the Murienua electorate for the Cook Islands Party.
