= George Angene =

Cook Islands politician (born 1961)

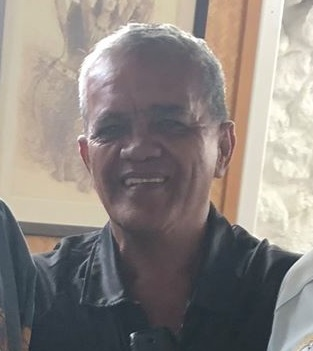
- Angene in 2019

Minister of Cultural Development and House of Ariki
- In office 10 July 2018 – September 2026
- Prime Minister: Henry Puna; Mark Brown
- Preceded by: Teariki Heather

Minister of Corrections
- In office 10 July 2018 – September 2026
- Prime Minister: Henry Puna; Mark Brown
- Preceded by: None (Portfolio created)

Member of the Cook Islands Parliament for Tupapa–Maraerenga
- In office 2010–2026
- Preceded by: John Tangi
- Succeeded by: Tamaiti Maru Willie

Member of the Cook Islands Parliament for Manihiki
- Incumbent
- Assumed office 2026
- Preceded by: Akaiti Puna

Personal details
- Born: 8 March 1961 (age 65)
- Party: One Cook Islands Movement; Cook Islands Party; Independent (2026–present)

George Maggie Angene (born 8 March 1961) is a Cook Islands politician and Cabinet Minister. He is a former member of the Cook Islands Party, and is now a member of the One Cook Islands Movement.

Angene was born in Tupapa Rarotonga and attended a local primary school, but received no secondary education. He is a former criminal who has served time in prison and describes himself as "one of the biggest criminals on Rarotonga". He became infamous in Rarotonga when he in 1992 set fire to the building block encompassing Ministry of Justice, Cook Islands Post Office and Telecom which were all badly damaged. Angene was sentenced to 13 years' jail for arson but was paroled and released in 1999. He learned new skills in prison and converted to Christianity.

He was selected as Cook Islands Party candidate for Tupapa–Maraerenga in a public runoff, and subsequently won the seat in the 2010 election.

In May 2014 Angene was expelled from the CIP after publicly refusing to back the party's position on superannuation. He stood instead for the One Cook Islands Movement and was re-elected in the 2014 election. He was re-elected again at the 2018 election. Following the election he was appointed to Cabinet as Minister of Corrective Services, Culture, Business Trade and Investment Board and the House of Ariki and rejoined the Cook Islands Party. In the reshuffle following the appointment of Mark Brown as Prime Minister he surrendered the Business Trade and Investment Board portfolio to Patrick Arioka, and became Minister of the Punanga Nui Market instead. He retained his other portfolios. A further reshuffle in June 2021 saw him retain his core portfolios, and gain responsibility for the Head of State.

In April 2021 an audit report found that Angene had acted improperly in arranging day-release for a convicted child-murderer to work in a tourism business. In June 2021 he called for planned elections in 2022 to be delayed if the COVID-19 crisis continued in order to save money.

He ran as a Cook Islands Party candidate in the 2022 election and was re-elected. He stated that this would be his last term. However, Angene did end up running for re-election in the 2026 general election, running in the Manihiki electorate as an independent candidate, and won.

In September 2026, Prime Minister Mark Brown requested Angene's resignation as a minister. Having been a cabinet minister for the Cook Islands Party in the previous parliament, Angene retained his warrant following re-election to parliament, despite running against the party in the election. Angene refused to resign as minister, though indicated that he would join the opposition. Following this, the Cook Islands Party central committee voted unanimously to expel Angene from the party and Brown removed him from cabinet.
