= 2003 Arutanga by-election =

Election in the Cook Islands

The Arutanga by-election was a by-election in the Cook Islands seat of Arutanga-Reureu-Nikaupara. It took place on 20 November 2003.

The by-election was precipitated by the resignation of Cook Islands Party MP Teina Bishop over budget cuts to his constituency. Bishop's resignation was initially handed to the Cook Islands Party, who refused to submit it to the Speaker; Bishop subsequently delivered it himself, and his seat was declared vacant. In the interim, the government announced that it would not stand a candidate. As a result, Bishop was elected unopposed.
