= 2018 Cook Islands general election =

- 14 June 2018
- All 24 seats in Parliament; 13 seats needed for a majority
| Party | Leader | Vote % | Seats | +/– |
|---|---|---|---|---|
| Cook Islands | Henry Puna | 42.30 | 10 | −2 |
| Democratic | Tina Browne | 41.91 | 11 | +1 |
| One Cook Islands | Teina Bishop | 10.81 | 1 | −1 |
| Independents | – | 3.77 | 2 | +2 |
This lists parties that won seats. See the complete results below.
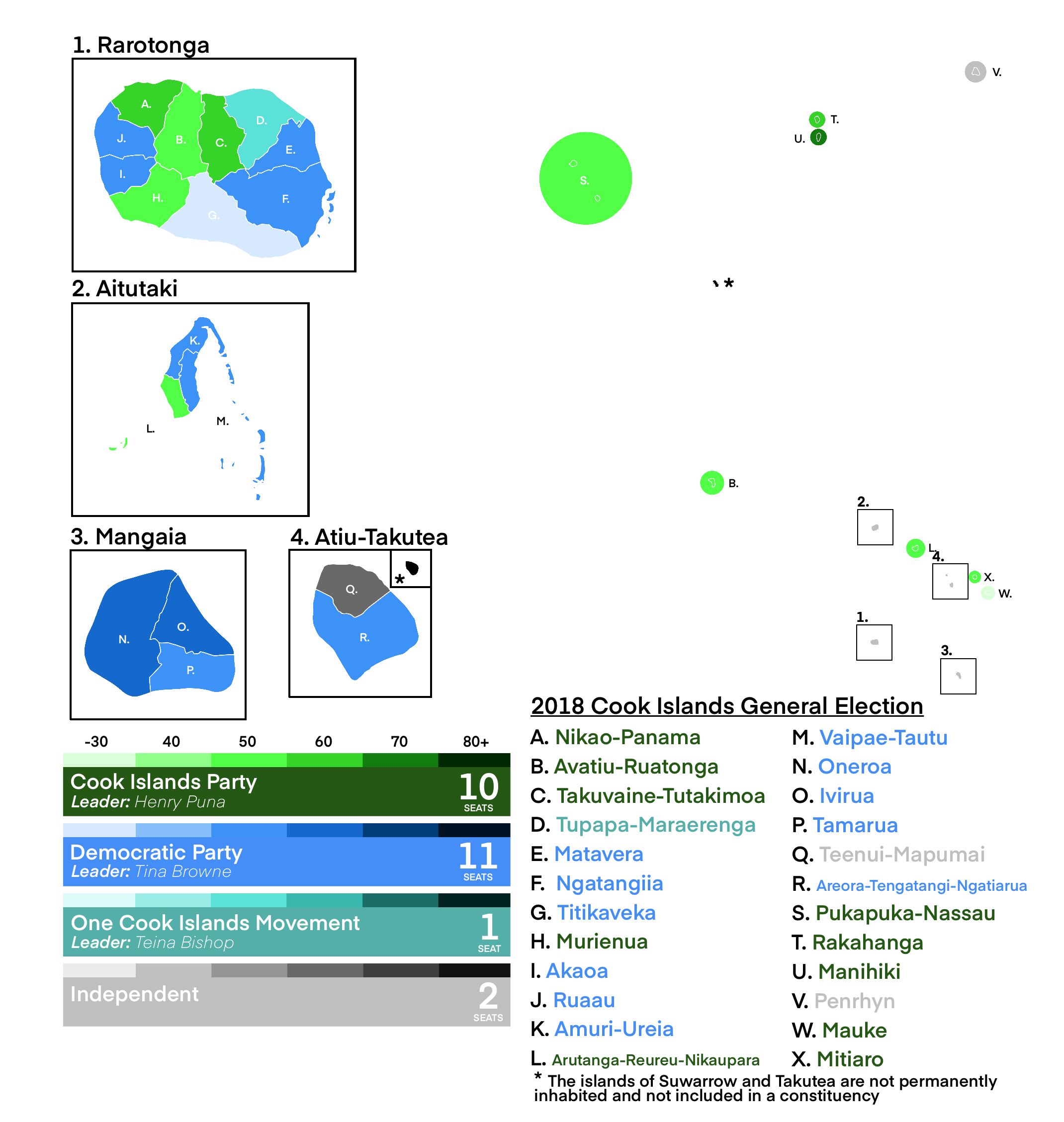
Results of the election by constituency.
| Prime Minister before | Prime Minister after election |
|---|---|
| Henry Puna; Cook Islands | Henry Puna; Cook Islands |

General elections were held in the Cook Islands on 14 June 2018 to elect the 24 members of the 17th Cook Islands Parliament.

The nationalist Cook Islands Party, led by the Prime Minister, Henry Puna, attempted to win a third consecutive term in government. However, the elections resulted in a hung parliament, with the opposition Democratic Party led by Tina Browne becoming the largest party, although Browne failed to win a seat, losing in Rakahanga constituency.

The Democratic Party won 11 seats, the Cook Islands Party 10 seats, One Cook Islands Movement one seat, with independent candidates winning two seats. Following the election, the Cook Islands Party joined forces with the independents and One Cook Islands to retain power.

== Electoral system ==
The Cook Islands a self-governing island country in the South Pacific Ocean in free association with New Zealand. Its government uses the Westminster system, with the 24 members of the Parliament of the Cook Islands elected from single-member constituencies by first-past-the-post voting. The Parliamentary term is four years. As of 12 June 2018, there were 10,917 people enrolled to vote in the elections.

== Results ==
Final results were published on 28 June.

| Party | Votes | % | Seats | +/– |
|---|---|---|---|---|
| Cook Islands Party | 3,654 | 42.30 | 10 | –2 |
| Democratic Party | 3,620 | 41.91 | 11 | +1 |
| One Cook Islands Movement | 934 | 10.81 | 1 | –1 |
| Titikaveka Oire | 97 | 1.12 | 0 | 0 |
| Alternative Must Ravenga Openga | 7 | 0.08 | 0 | New |
| Independents | 326 | 3.77 | 2 | +2 |
| Total | 8,638 | 100.00 | 24 | 0 |
Source: Cook Islands Gazette

=== By electorate ===
Akaoa
| Party | Candidate | Votes | % | ±% |
|---|---|---|---|---|
| Democratic | Nooroa o Teariki Baker | 233 | 53.8 | |
| Cook Islands | Teariki Heather | 200 | 46.2 | |
| Turnout | | 433 | | |
| Democratic gain from Cook Islands | | Swing | | |

Amuri–Ureia
| Party | Candidate | Votes | % | ±% |
|---|---|---|---|---|
| Democratic | Terepai Maoate Jnr | 192 | 59.3 | |
| Cook Islands | Toanui Isamaela | 132 | 40.7 | |
| Turnout | | 324 | | |
| Democratic gain from Cook Islands | | Swing | | |

Arutanga–Reureu–Nikaupara
| Party | Candidate | Votes | % | ±% |
|---|---|---|---|---|
| Cook Islands | Tereapii Maki-Kavana | 180 | 51.6 | |
| One Cook Islands | Pumati Israela | 169 | 48.4 | |
| Turnout | | 349 | | |
| Cook Islands gain from One Cook Islands | | Swing | | |

Avatiu–Ruatonga–Palmerston
| Party | Candidate | Votes | % | ±% |
|---|---|---|---|---|
| Cook Islands | Albert Nicholas | 305 | 52.9 | |
| Democratic | Teina Rongo | 272 | 47.1 | |
| Turnout | | 577 | | |
| Cook Islands hold | | Swing | | |

Ivirua
| Party | Candidate | Votes | % | ±% |
|---|---|---|---|---|
| Democratic | Anthony Toruariki Armstrong | 52 | 61.2 | |
| Cook Islands | Marion Harry | 33 | 38.8 | |
| Turnout | | 85 | | |
| Democratic hold | | Swing | | |

Manihiki
| Party | Candidate | Votes | % | ±% |
|---|---|---|---|---|
| Cook Islands | Henry Puna | 97 | 74.0 | |
| Democratic | Apii Piho | 34 | 26.0 | |
| Turnout | | 131 | | |
| Cook Islands hold | | Swing | | |

Matavera
| Party | Candidate | Votes | % | ±% |
|---|---|---|---|---|
| Democratic | Vaitoti Tupa | 298 | 51.8 | |
| Cook Islands | Kiriau Turepu | 277 | 48.2 | |
| Turnout | | 575 | | |
| Democratic gain from Cook Islands | | Swing | | |

Mauke
| Party | Candidate | Votes | % | ±% |
|---|---|---|---|---|
| Cook Islands | Tai Tura | 68 | 39.1 | |
| One Cook Islands | Tungane Williams | 67 | 38.5 | |
| Democratic | Belezadala Tangata William Tararo | 39 | 22.4 | |
| Turnout | | 174 | | |
| Cook Islands hold | | Swing | | |

Mitiaro
| Party | Candidate | Votes | % | ±% |
|---|---|---|---|---|
| Cook Islands | Tuakeu Tangatapoto | 58 | 53.7 | |
| Democratic | Tangata Vavia | 50 | 46.3 | |
| Turnout | | 108 | | |
| Cook Islands gain from Democratic | | Swing | | |

Murienua
| Party | Candidate | Votes | % | ±% |
|---|---|---|---|---|
| Cook Islands | Patrick Arioka | 223 | 50.1 | |
| Democratic | James Beer | 152 | 34.2 | |
| One Cook Islands | Teariki Taraare Unuka | 70 | 15.7 | |
| Turnout | | 445 | | |
| Cook Islands gain from Democratic | | Swing | | |

Ngatangiia
| Party | Candidate | Votes | % | ±% |
|---|---|---|---|---|
| Democratic | Tamaiva Tuavera | 278 | 54.1 | |
| Cook Islands | Tukaka Ama | 236 | 45.9 | |
| Turnout | | 514 | | |
| Democratic hold | | Swing | | |

Nikao–Panama
| Party | Candidate | Votes | % | ±% |
|---|---|---|---|---|
| Cook Islands | Vaine Mokoroa | 511 | 65.3 | |
| Democratic | Ngamau Munokoa | 271 | 34.6 | |
| Turnout | | 782 | | |
| Cook Islands gain from Democratic | | Swing | | |

Oneroa
| Party | Candidate | Votes | % | ±% |
|---|---|---|---|---|
| Democratic | Wesley Kareroa | 118 | 67.4 | |
| Cook Islands | Teina Ngametuatoe | 57 | 32.6 | |
| Turnout | | 175 | | |
| Democratic hold | | Swing | | |

Penrhyn
| Party | Candidate | Votes | % | ±% |
|---|---|---|---|---|
| Independent | Robert Tapaitau | 54 | 46.1 | |
| Cook Islands | Willie John | 34 | 29.1 | |
| Democratic | Wilkie Rasmussen | 29 | 24.8 | |
| Turnout | | 117 | | |
| Independent gain from Democratic | | Swing | | |

Pukapuka–Nassau
| Party | Candidate | Votes | % | ±% |
|---|---|---|---|---|
| Cook Islands | Tingika Elikana | 143 | 52.4 | |
| Democratic | Junior Willie Katoa | 130 | 47.6 | |
| Turnout | | 273 | | |
| Cook Islands hold | | Swing | | |

Rakahanga
| Party | Candidate | Votes | % | ±% |
|---|---|---|---|---|
| Cook Islands | Toka Hagai | 39 | 61.9 | |
| Democratic | Tina Browne | 24 | 38.1 | |
| Turnout | | 63 | | |
| Cook Islands hold | | Swing | | |

Ruaau
| Party | Candidate | Votes | % | ±% |
|---|---|---|---|---|
| Democratic | William (Smiley) Heather | 354 | 53.7 | |
| Cook Islands | Arama Joseph Wichman | 305 | 46.3 | |
| Turnout | | 659 | | |
| Democratic hold | | Swing | | |

Takuvaine–Tutakimoa
| Party | Candidate | Votes | % | ±% |
|---|---|---|---|---|
| Cook Islands | Mark Brown | 321 | 66.2 | |
| Democratic | Teokotai George | 155 | 32.0 | |
| Independent | George Pitt | 9 | 1.9 | |
| Turnout | | 485 | | |
| Cook Islands hold | | Swing | | |

Tamarua
| Party | Candidate | Votes | % | ±% |
|---|---|---|---|---|
| Democratic | Tetangi Matapo | 31 | 59.6 | |
| Cook Islands | Mia Teaurima | 21 | 40.4 | |
| Turnout | | 52 | | |
| Democratic hold | | Swing | | |

Teenui–Mapumai
| Party | Candidate | Votes | % | ±% |
|---|---|---|---|---|
| Independent | Rose Toki-Brown | 77 | 66.4 | |
| Cook Islands | Tereapii Porio | 31 | 26.7 | |
| Democratic | Tania Akai | 8 | 6.9 | |
| Turnout | | 116 | | |
| Independent gain from Cook Islands | | Swing | | |

Tengatangi–Areora–Ngatiarua
| Party | Candidate | Votes | % | ±% |
|---|---|---|---|---|
| Democratic | Te-Hani Brown | 71 | 56.3 | |
| Cook Islands | Nandi Glassie | 48 | 38.1 | |
| Alternative Must Ravenga Openga | Norman George | 7 | 5.6 | |
| Turnout | | 126 | | |
| Democratic gain from Cook Islands | | Swing | | |

Titikaveka
| Party | Candidate | Votes | % | ±% |
|---|---|---|---|---|
| Democratic | Selina Napa | 225 | 31.6 | |
| Cook Islands | Moeroa Thomas-Tamangaro | 184 | 25.8 | |
| Independent | Margharet Matenga | 138 | 19.4 | |
| Titikaveka Oire | Teava Iro | 97 | 13.6 | |
| One Cook Islands | John Tumutoa | 69 | 9.7 | |
| Turnout | | 713 | | |
| Democratic hold | | Swing | | |

Tupapa–Maraerenga
| Party | Candidate | Votes | % | ±% |
|---|---|---|---|---|
| One Cook Islands | George Angene | 559 | 53.8 | |
| Democratic | Lee Harmon | 433 | 41.6 | |
| Independent | Teresa Manarangi-Trott | 48 | 4.6 | |
| Turnout | | 1040 | | |
| One Cook Islands hold | | Swing | | |

Vaipae–Tautu
| Party | Candidate | Votes | % | ±% |
|---|---|---|---|---|
| Democratic | Kitai Teinakore | 171 | 53.1 | |
| Cook Islands | Mona Ioane | 151 | 46.9 | |
| Turnout | | 322 | | |
| Democratic hold | | Swing | | |

=== By island ===
Popular vote
| Island | CIP | Democratic | Total votes |
|---|---|---|---|
| Rarotonga | 41.84% | 44.06% | 6,223 |
| Other islands | 43.47% | 36.35% | 2,415 |

=== Seats changing hands ===
| Seat | Pre-election | | | Post-election | | |
| Seat | Party | Member | Percentage | Percentage | Member | Party |
|---|---|---|---|---|---|---|
| Akaoa | CIP | Teariki Heather | 52.1 | 53.8 | Nooroa o Teariki Baker | Democratic |
| Amuri-Ureia | CIP | Toanui Isamaela | 57.8 | 59.3 | Terepai Maoate Jnr | Democratic |
| Arutanga-Reureu-Nikaupara | OCI | Pumati Israela | 68.2 | 51.6 | Tereapii Maki-Kavana | CIP |
| Matavera | CIP | Kiriau Turepu | 51.2 | 51.8 | Vaitoti Tupa | Democratic |
| Mitiaro | Democratic | Tangata Vavia | 50.5 | 53.7 | Tuakeu Tangatapoto | CIP |
| Murienua | Democratic | James Beer | 50.4 | 50.1 | Patrick Arioka | CIP |
| Nikao-Panama | Democratic | Ngamau Munokoa | 64.1 | 65.3 | Vaine Mokoroa | CIP |
| Penrhyn | Democratic | Wilkie Rasmussen | 46.6 | 46.1 | Robert Tapaitau | Independent |
| Teenui-Mapumai | CIP | Tereapii Porio | 54.6 | 66.4 | Rose Toki-Brown | Independent |
| Tengatangi-Areora-Ngatiarua | CIP | Nandi Glassie | 54.7 | 56.3 | Te-Hani Brown | Democratic |

== Aftermath ==
Although the Democratic Party won the most seats, neither leader Tina Browne nor Deputy Leader James Beer were elected to Parliament. The constitution of the Cook Islands requires the Prime Minister to be a member of parliament.

On 7 July the Cook Islands party formed an alliance with independent MPs Rose Toki-Brown and Robert Tapaitau, and One Cook Islands movement's George Maggie to retain power. Toki-Brown, Tapaitau and Maggie were all appointed to Cabinet, replacing Ministers who had lost their seats.

Six electoral petitions were filed, challenging the results in Rakahanga, Murienua, Pukapuka-Nassau, Avatiu-Ruatonga-Palmerston, Ngatangiia, and Mauke. However, all of these petitions were rejected, confirming the result of the election. Rakahanga MP Toka Hagai resigned on 1 November 2018 after allegations of treating. In December 2018 the Court of Appeal ruled that Tina Browne had won the seat.
