= Winton Pickering =

Cook Islands politician

Member of the Cook Islands Parliament for Oneroa
- In office 7 September 2004 – 9 July 2014
- Succeeded by: Wesley Kareroa

Personal details
- Born: 8 December 1962 (age 63) Rarotonga
- Party: Cook Islands Democratic Party

Winton Brian Pickering (born 8 December 1962) is a Cook Islands politician and former member of the Cook Islands Parliament, representing the seat of Oneroa. He is a member of the Cook Islands Democratic Party.

Pickering was born on Rarotonga and attended Avarua and Nikao Side School Primary Schools and Nukutere College. He was first elected to Parliament at the 2004 election. He was re-elected at the 2010 election. He did not stand in the 2014 election.
