= Teokotai Herman =

Cook Islands politician

Member of the Cook Islands Parliament for Vaipae–Tautu
- Incumbent
- Assumed office 1 August 2022
- Preceded by: Kitai Teinakore

Personal details
- Party: Cook Islands Party

Teokotai James "Tango" Herman is a Cook Islands politician and member of the Cook Islands Parliament. He is a member of the Cook Islands Party.

Herman is a boatbuilder who has served five terms as mayor of Aitutaki. He stood unsuccessfully for the electorate of Amuri–Ureia at the 2004 Cook Islands general election. He was first elected to parliament in the 2022 Cook Islands general election. He was sworn in as an MP on 21 March 2023.

Herman won re-election at the 2026 general election.
