= Vaitoti Tupa =

Cook Islands politician (born 1957)

Member of the Cook Islands Parliament for Matavera
- In office 14 June 2018 – 25 June 2026
- Preceded by: Kiriau Turepu
- Succeeded by: Taneao Ngamata

Personal details
- Born: 23 July 1957 (age 69)
- Party: Cook Islands Democratic Party

Vaitoti Tupa (born 23 July 1957) is a Cook Islands politician and member of the Cook Islands Parliament. He is a member of the Cook Islands Democratic Party. He is the son of former MP Ngai Tupa.

Tupa was born on Rarotonga and educated at Avarua School and Tereora College. He later attended the University of the South Pacific, graduating with an MBA. Trained as a surveyor, he worked as a public servant in the Survey Department. In 2000 he was appointed as the director of the National Environment Services. He was reappointed to the position in 2009, but a report from the national audit office subsequently found that the reappointment decision had been unduly influenced by his mother and had been made on the basis of political interest, not merit. Disagreement over the appointment had led to a cabinet reshuffle, with the environment portfolio been removed from Kete Ioane by Prime Minister Jim Marurai and given to Ngamau Munokoa so that she could make the appointment. Despite this, he remained in the position until 2015, when he was unexpectedly not reappointed after 15 years service.

Tupa is a traditional drummer and a member of the Te Korero Maori Cultural Performing Arts Group. He has performed in France, the UK and Hawaii.

Tupa was elected to Parliament at the 2018 Cook Islands general election, defeating agriculture minister Kiriau Turepu to win the Matavera electorate. In 2019 he was the opposition's nominee for Deputy Speaker, but was defeated by Tai Tura. In February 2020 he was appointed Democratic Party spokesperson for Agriculture, Cultural Development, Finance and Economic Development. He will also share the Environment and the Cook Islands Investment Corporation portfolios with senior MPs. At the 2022 election he was the only Democrat MP on Rarotonga to retain his seat.

Tupa lost his seat at the 2026 general election, with no Democratic Party candidates being elected to parliament.
