= 2026 Cook Islands general election =

- 12 August 2026
- All 24 seats in Parliament; 13 seats needed for a majority
Party	Leader	Vote %	Seats	+/–
Cook Islands	Mark Brown	45.3	13	+1
Cook Islands United	Teariki Heather	31.1	4	+1
Independents	–	10.9	7	+4
This lists parties that won seats. See the complete results below.
Prime Minister before	Prime Minister after election
Mark Brown; Cook Islands	Mark Brown; Cook Islands

General elections were held in the Cook Islands on 12 August 2026 to determine the composition of the 19th Parliament.

Voting on the island of Nassau in the electorate of Pukapuka–Nassau was delayed to 13 August due to adverse weather.

== Electoral system ==
The 24 members of Parliament were elected from single-member electorates by first-past-the-post voting.

There were approximately 11,000 registered voters for this election.

== Results ==
Based on preliminary results, the Cook Islands Party looked to have won 12 out of the 24 seats of the parliament, the Cook Islands United Party won four, and the Democratic Party did not win any seats. Cook Islands Party leader and incumbent prime minister Mark Brown won his Takuvaine-Tutakimoa seat and United Party leader Teariki Heather won his Murienua seat, but Democratic Party and opposition leader Tina Browne looked to have lost her Rakahanga seat to Cook Islands Party candidate Levi Hitarahera Teinaki.

With the declaration of the final result on 26 August, Cook Islands Party candidate Tingika Elikana was found to have overcome a narrow deficit shown in the preliminary results to retain his seat, giving his party an outright majority of 13 seats in the parliament. Independent candidates won seven seats, the Cook Islands United Party won four, and the Democratic Party was confirmed to have lost all of its seats.

Graph of the party split among 24 seats.
Party	Votes	%	+/–	Seats	+/–
Cook Islands Party	4,175	45.32	+1.25	13	+1
Cook Islands United Party	2,866	31.11	+12.30	4	+1
Democratic Party	1,116	12.11	–14.82	0	–5
Progressive Party of the Cook Islands	53	0.58	+0.38	0	0
Independents (Note: Includes the Atiu candidates who ran under the Independent-Enuamanu label and the Mauke candidate who ran under the Independence Party label.)	1,003	10.89	+3.58	7	+4
Total	9,213	100.00	–	24	0

=== By electorate ===
Constituency		Candidate	Party	Votes	%
Rarotonga	Akaoa	Robert Stanley Heather^{†}	Cook Islands United	324	82.7
Rarotonga	Akaoa	Teakaau Tex Tangimetua	Cook Islands	68	17.3
Rarotonga	Avatiu–Ruatonga–Palmerston	Albert Nicholas^{†}	Cook Islands	376	62.5
Rarotonga	Avatiu–Ruatonga–Palmerston	Teina Rongo	Cook Islands United	226	37.5
Rarotonga	Matavera	Taneao Ngamata	Cook Islands United	240	37.7
Rarotonga	Matavera	Vaitoti Tupa^{†}	Democratic	231	36.3
Rarotonga	Matavera	Aneru Andrew Tautu	Cook Islands	166	26.1
Rarotonga	Murienua	Teariki Heather^{†}	Cook Islands United	344	64.9
Rarotonga	Murienua	Nooroa Baker	Cook Islands	169	31.9
Rarotonga	Murienua	Samuel Mataroa	Democratic	17	3.2
Rarotonga	Ngatangiia	Tukaka Ama^{†}	Cook Islands	272	45.6
Rarotonga	Ngatangiia	Mapi Ioteva	Cook Islands United	241	40.4
Rarotonga	Ngatangiia	Itinga Maoate	Democratic	65	10.9
Rarotonga	Ngatangiia	Christopher Robert Denny	Progressive	18	3.0
Rarotonga	Nikao–Panama	Vaine Mokoroa^{†}	Cook Islands	497	59.0
Rarotonga	Nikao–Panama	Ngamau Mere Munokoa	Cook Islands United	311	36.9
Rarotonga	Nikao–Panama	Te Tuhi Tauratumaru Kelly	Progressive	35	4.2
Rarotonga	Ruaau	Tim Tunui Varu^{†}	Cook Islands United	370	51.7
Rarotonga	Ruaau	Arama Wichman	Cook Islands	301	42.1
Rarotonga	Ruaau	William (Smiley) Heather	Democratic	44	6.2
Rarotonga	Takuvaine–Tutakimoa	Mark Brown^{†}	Cook Islands	312	60.2
Rarotonga	Takuvaine–Tutakimoa	Davina Hosking-Ashford	Democratic	115	22.2
Rarotonga	Takuvaine–Tutakimoa	Venetia Mere Jacqueline Tuara	Cook Islands United	91	17.6
Rarotonga	Titikaveka	Sonny Williams^{†}	Cook Islands	363	45.9
Rarotonga	Titikaveka	Elizabeth Iro	Cook Islands United	238	30.1
Rarotonga	Titikaveka	Sholan Ivaiti	Democratic	189	23.9
Rarotonga	Tupapa–Maraerenga	Tamaiti Maru Willie	Cook Islands	617	64.2
Rarotonga	Tupapa–Maraerenga	Rota Tama Williams	Cook Islands United	227	23.6
Rarotonga	Tupapa–Maraerenga	Edward Victor Drollett	Democratic	117	12.2
Aitutaki	Amuri–Ureia	Toanui Isamaela^{†}	Cook Islands	165	41.9
Aitutaki	Amuri–Ureia	Terepai Maoate	Democratic	106	26.9
Aitutaki	Amuri–Ureia	Nicholas Royle Henry	Independent	98	24.9
Aitutaki	Amuri–Ureia	Tumutoa Teariki Nicholls	Cook Islands United	25	6.3
Aitutaki	Arutanga–Reureu–Nikaupara	Tereapii Maki-Kavana^{†}	Cook Islands	179	46.7
Aitutaki	Arutanga–Reureu–Nikaupara	Maitoe Henry	Cook Islands United	113	29.5
Aitutaki	Arutanga–Reureu–Nikaupara	Tekura Moeroa Bishop	Independent	91	23.8
Aitutaki	Vaipae–Tautu	Teokotai Herman^{†}	Cook Islands	241	52.3
Aitutaki	Vaipae–Tautu	Teariki Reva George	Democratic	139	30.2
Aitutaki	Vaipae–Tautu	Teariki Kureta Tangua	Cook Islands United	81	17.6
Mangaia	Ivirua	Agnes Armstrong^{†}	Independent	Uncontested	
Mangaia	Oneroa	Rimmel Poila-Mokoroa	Independent	77	37.2
Mangaia	Oneroa	Teina Tearii	Cook Islands	66	31.9
Mangaia	Oneroa	Wesley Kareroa^{†}	Democratic	64	30.9
Mangaia	Tamarua	Tetangi Matapo^{†}	Independent	34	59.6
Mangaia	Tamarua	Ngatamaroa Ngatokorua	Cook Islands	23	40.4
Atiu	Teenui–Mapumai	Rose Toki-Brown^{†}	Independent-Enuamanu	81	77.9
Atiu	Teenui–Mapumai	Charles Amaru Koronui	Independent	23	22.1
Atiu	Tengatangi–Areora–Ngatiarua	Te-Hani Brown^{†}	Independent-Enuamanu	95	66.9
Atiu	Tengatangi–Areora–Ngatiarua	Puai Tane Wichman	Independent	47	33.1
Outer Islands	Manihiki	George Maggie Angene^{†} (Note: Previously the MP for Tupapa-Maraerenga)	Independent	56	45.9
Outer Islands	Manihiki	Akaiti Puna^{†}	Cook Islands	51	41.8
Outer Islands	Manihiki	Puapii William	Independent	15	12.3
Outer Islands	Mauke	Stephen Matapo^{†}	Independence Party	175	89.3
Outer Islands	Mauke	James Vini Beer	Independent	21	10.7
Outer Islands	Mitiaro	Tuakeu Tangatapoto^{†}	Cook Islands	60	61.9
Outer Islands	Mitiaro	Makara Murare	Cook Islands United	35	36.1
Outer Islands	Mitiaro	Paul Raui Pokoati Allsworth	Democratic	2	2.1
Outer Islands	Penrhyn	Vaine Wichman	Cook Islands	71	58.7
Outer Islands	Penrhyn	Sarakura Tapaitau^{†}	Independent	50	41.3
Outer Islands	Pukapuka–Nassau	Tingika Elikana^{†}	Cook Islands	146	51.0
Outer Islands	Pukapuka–Nassau	Kirianu Nio	Independent	140	49.0
Outer Islands	Rakahanga	Levi Hitarahera Teinaki	Cook Islands	32	54.2
Outer Islands	Rakahanga	Tina Pupuke-Browne^{†}	Democratic	27	45.8
^{†} – indicates an incumbent candidate

== Aftermath ==
Following these elections, the Cook Islands Party secured an historic fifth consecutive term in government, having won a majority of 13 of the 24 seats in parliament. The party also has existing partnership agreements with the two independent candidates elected for Atiu and the candidate for Mauke. The three independent candidates elected for Mangaia have since agreed to join the Cook Islands Party. This would give the Cook Islands Party-led government caucus a supermajority of 19 seats in parliament. Mark Brown confirmed that he would retain all previous Cabinet ministers that had won their seats in their positions.

Opposition parties the Democratic Party and Cook Islands United Party began talks of a potential merger. Democratic Party leader Tina Pupuke-Browne has pledged a campaign review following the party's poor performance in the election.

The leader of the Cook Islands United Party Teariki Heather nominated his brother Robert Stanley Heather, the MP for Akaoa, for leader of the Opposition.

Three electoral petitions challenging the results of the election in the Avatiu–Ruatonga–Palmerston, Matavera and Pukapuka–Nassau electorates were filed with the Ministry of Justice. As of October 2026, hearing dates for these petitions have yet to be set.

In September 2026, the independent MP for Mauke, Stephen Matapo, formally joined the Cook Islands Party, bringing their majority to 14.

Further in September 2026, Mark Brown requested that the independent MP for Manihiki, George Angene, resign as a minister. Having been a cabinet minister in the previous parliament as a Cook Islands Party MP, Angene retained his warrant following his re-election to parliament, despite having run against the party. Angene refused to resign as minister, though indicated that he would join the opposition. Following this, the Cook Islands Party central committee voted unanimously to expel Angene from the party and Brown removed him from cabinet.
