= Patrick Arioka =

Cook Islands politician

Minister of Telecommunications
- In office 2 June 2021 – 1 August 2022
- Prime Minister: Mark Brown
- Preceded by: Mark Brown

Minister of Tourism
- In office 8 October 2020 – 1 August 2022
- Prime Minister: Mark Brown
- Preceded by: Henry Puna

Member of the Cook Islands Parliament for Murienua
- In office 14 June 2018 – 1 August 2022
- Preceded by: James Beer
- Succeeded by: Teariki Heather

Personal details
- Born: 24 July 1971 (age 54)
- Party: Cook Islands Party

Patrick Arioka (born 24 July 1971) is a Cook Islands politician and former Cabinet Minister. He is a former member of the Cook Islands Parliament, representing the seat of Murienua. He is a member of the Cook Islands Party.

Arioka was born on Rarotonga and educated at Avatea School, Avarua School, and Atiu College. He studied tropical agriculture at the University of the South Pacific campus in Alafua, followed by a Master in Business Administration. He worked as a forestry officer for the government, and then as a policy advisor. He served on the board of the Cook Islands Red Cross Society from 2006 to 2018, and from 2016 to 2018 was its president.

Arioka served as campaign manager for unsuccessful CIP candidate Kaota Tuariki in the 2014 Murienua by-election. He contested the seat himself at the 2014, losing to the Democratic party's James Beer. He entered parliament after winning the seat at the 2018 election. Following the election he was appointed associate agriculture minister.

On 8 October 2020 Arioka was appointed to the Cabinet of Prime Minister Mark Brown as Minister of Tourism and the Business Trade and Investment Board. A further reshuffle on 2 June 2021 saw him gain the Telecommunications portfolio.

He lost his seat in the 2022 Cook Islands general election. In January 2023 he was appointed to the board of the Cook Islands Investment Corporation.
