= One Cook Islands Movement =

- Abbreviation: OCI
- Leader: George Turia
- Founder: Teina Bishop
- Founded: 1 May 2014
- Split from: Cook Islands Party
- Seats in the Cook Islands Parliament: 0 / 24

Party flag

The One Cook Islands Movement, formerly called Cook Islands One, is a political party in the Cook Islands. It was established in May 2014.

The party was founded by former Cabinet Minister Teina Bishop after his resignation from Cabinet and expulsion from the Cook Islands Party. The party planned to contest the 2014 elections, but only ran 8 candidates with the explicit aim of being a support partner to the government. Following his expulsion from the CIP, George Angene announced that he would be joining One Cook Islands.

The party ran four candidates in the 2014 election, in the seats of Tupapa–Maraerenga, Arutanga-Reureu-Nikaupara, Mauke and Pukapuka-Nassau. It won two seats.

In the 2018 election, One Cook Islands fielded five candidates, with Bishop not standing. The party won one seat, with Angene retaining his seat in Tupapa–Maraerenga.

In the 2022 election, the party fielded two candidates, Teina Bishop and Toanui Isamaela. Bishop came second with 111 votes in Arutanga-Reureu-Nikaupara behind Tereapii Maki-Kavana. Isamaela won Amuri–Ureia with 126 votes, beating out incumbent Terepai Maoate Jnr, who had 123 votes.

The party stood no candidates in the 2026 election, with incumbent MP Toanui Isamaela instead winning re-election under the Cook Islands Party banner.

== Leaders ==
No.	Leader	Term of office	
1	Teina Bishop	May 2014	c. 2021
2	George Turia	c. 2022	present

== Electoral performance ==
=== Legislative Assembly ===
Election	Votes	%	Seats	+/–	Position	Government
2014	790	9.45	2 / 24	2	3rd	Opposition
2018	934	10.81	1 / 24	▼1	3rd	Opposition
2022	237	2.68	1 / 24	1	▼4th	Opposition
