= Terepai Maoate Jnr =

Cook Islands politician

Member of the Cook Islands Parliament for Amuri–Ureia
- In office 14 June 2018 – 1 August 2022
- Preceded by: Toanui Isamaela
- Succeeded by: Toanui Isamaela
- In office 7 September 2004 – 17 November 2010
- Preceded by: Paora Teiti
- Succeeded by: Toanui Isamaela

Personal details
- Born: 5 December 1961 (age 64)
- Party: Democratic Party

Terepai Maoate Jnr (born 5 December 1961), also known as Junior Maoate, is a former Cook Islands politician. He is a member of the Democratic Party and represented the constituency of Amuri–Ureia from 2004 to 2010 and again from 2018 to 2022. He is the son of former Cook Islands Prime Minister Sir Terepai Maoate.

Maoate was born on Manihiki and educated at Araura Primary school, Araura College and Tereora College. He later attended Whangarei Boys College and the University of Auckland in New Zealand. He was first elected to the Cook Islands Parliament at the 2004 election. He served as Associate Minister of Finance and Health.

In September 2010 he threatened to quit the Democratic Party if his father's nomination for the seat of Ngatangiia was not confirmed. He ran as a Democratic candidate, but failed to win re-election. He was subsequently re-elected at the 2018 election. In February 2020 he was appointed Democratic Party spokesperson for Audit, Broadcasting and Telecommunications, Financial Intelligence Unit, Seabed Mining Authority and Natural Resources. In March 2021 he was replaced as deputy leader of the Democratic Party by William (Smiley) Heather.

He lost his seat in the 2022 Cook Islands general election. Maoate again stood unsuccessfully in Amuri–Ureia in the 2026 general election.
