= Nikao–Panama =

Electoral division in the Cook Islands

- Constituency for the Parliament of the Cook Islands
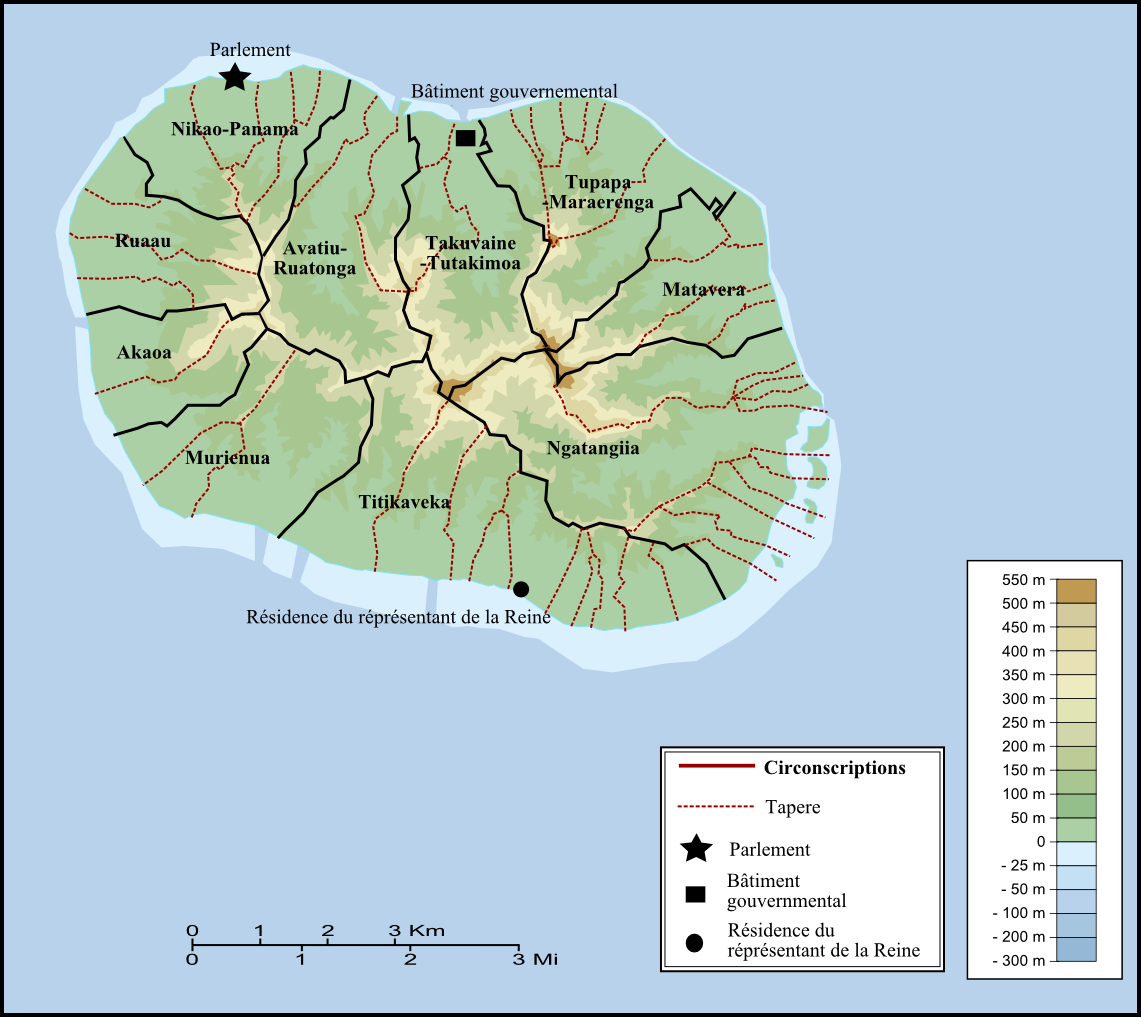
- Region: Rarotonga

Current constituency
- Created: 1981
- Number of members: 1
- Member: Vaine Mokoroa
- Created from: Te-au-o-tonga

Nikao–Panama is a Cook Islands electoral division returning one member to the Cook Islands Parliament.

The electorate was created in 1981, when the Constitution Amendment (No. 9) Act 1980–1981 adjusted electorate boundaries and split the electorate of Te-au-o-tonga into four. In 1986 by the Constitution Amendment (No. 12) Act 1986 transferred the tapere of Atupa to Avatiu–Ruatonga–Palmerston. It consists of the tapere of Pokoinu, Nikao, Puapuautu, Areanu, and Kaikaveka on the island of Rarotonga.

== Members of Parliament ==
Election	Member	Party
1994	Niroa Manuela	Unknown
1996 by-election, 1999, 2004, 2006, 2010, 2014	Ngamau Munokoa	Democratic Party
2018, 2022, 2026	Vaine Mokoroa	Cook Islands Party

== Election results ==
2026 Cook Islands general election: Nikao–Panama
Party	Candidate	Votes	%	±%
Cook Islands	Vaine Mokoroa^{†}	497	59.0	
Cook Islands United	Ngamau Mere Munokoa	311	36.9	
Progressive	Te Tuhi Tauratumaru Kelly	35	4.2	
Turnout		843		
Cook Islands hold		Swing		
^{†} incumbent
