= Toanui Isamaela =

Cook Islands politician

Member of the Cook Islands Parliament for Amuri–Ureia
- Incumbent
- Assumed office 1 August 2022
- Preceded by: Terepai Maoate Jnr
- In office 17 November 2010 – 14 June 2018
- Preceded by: Terepai Maoate Jnr
- Succeeded by: Terepai Maoate Jnr

Personal details
- Party: Cook Islands Party; One Cook Islands Movement

Toanui Isamaela is a Cook Islands politician and member of the Cook Islands Parliament. He is a member of the Cook Islands Party, having previously been a member of the One Cook Islands Movement.

Isamaela was first elected to Parliament at the 2010 Cook Islands general election. He was re-elected at the 2014 election. He was not re-elected in 2018, losing the seat to Democrat Terepai Maoate Jnr.

He contested the 2022 Cook Islands general election as a One Cook Islands Movement candidate, and was re-elected.

Isamaela won re-election at the 2026 general election running as a Cook Islands Party candidate.
