= Vaine Mokoroa =

Cook Islands politician

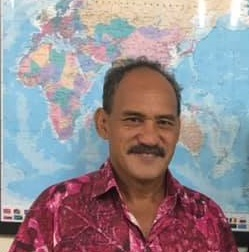
- Vaine Mokoroa in 2019

Minister of Justice
- Incumbent
- Assumed office 2 June 2021
- Prime Minister: Mark Brown
- Preceded by: Rose Toki-Brown

Minister of Education
- Incumbent
- Assumed office 4 June 2020
- Prime Minister: Henry Puna; Mark Brown
- Preceded by: Henry Puna

Minister of Internal Affairs
- In office 21 September 2018 – 2 June 2021
- Preceded by: Albert Nicholas
- Succeeded by: Rose Toki-Brown

Minister of Police
- In office 21 September 2018 – 4 June 2020
- Prime Minister: Henry Puna
- Preceded by: Albert Nicholas
- Succeeded by: Henry Puna

Member of the Cook Islands Parliament for Nikao–Panama
- Incumbent
- Assumed office 14 June 2018
- Preceded by: Ngamau Munokoa

Personal details
- Born: 28 December 1966 (age 59) Atiu, Cook Islands
- Party: Cook Islands Party
- Education: University of the South Pacific

Vaine Makiroa Mokoroa (born 28 December 1966) is a Cook Islands politician and Cabinet Minister. He is a member of the Cook Islands Party.

== Career ==
Mokoroa was born in 1966 in Atiu. He has previously worked as a police officer, chief of staff in the office of the Prime Minister, and as acting secretary of the Ministry of Infrastructure and Planning. He entered parliament in the 2018 elections, winning the seat of Nikao–Panama from Ngamau Munokoa. In September 2018 he was appointed to Cabinet as Minister of Police and Internal Affairs, following the sacking of Albert Nicholas. In June 2020 he surrendered his police portfolio and was appointed Education Minister in a Cabinet reshuffle.

In the Cabinet reshuffle following the appointment of Mark Brown as Prime Minister his position as Education Minister was confirmed, and he retained all his other Cabinet portfolios. A further reshuffle in June 2021 saw him swap his Internal Affairs portfolio for Justice.

He was re-elected at the 2022 Cook Islands general election, and again at the 2026 general election.
