= Tupapa–Maraerenga =

Electoral division of the Cook Islands

- Constituency for the Parliament of the Cook Islands
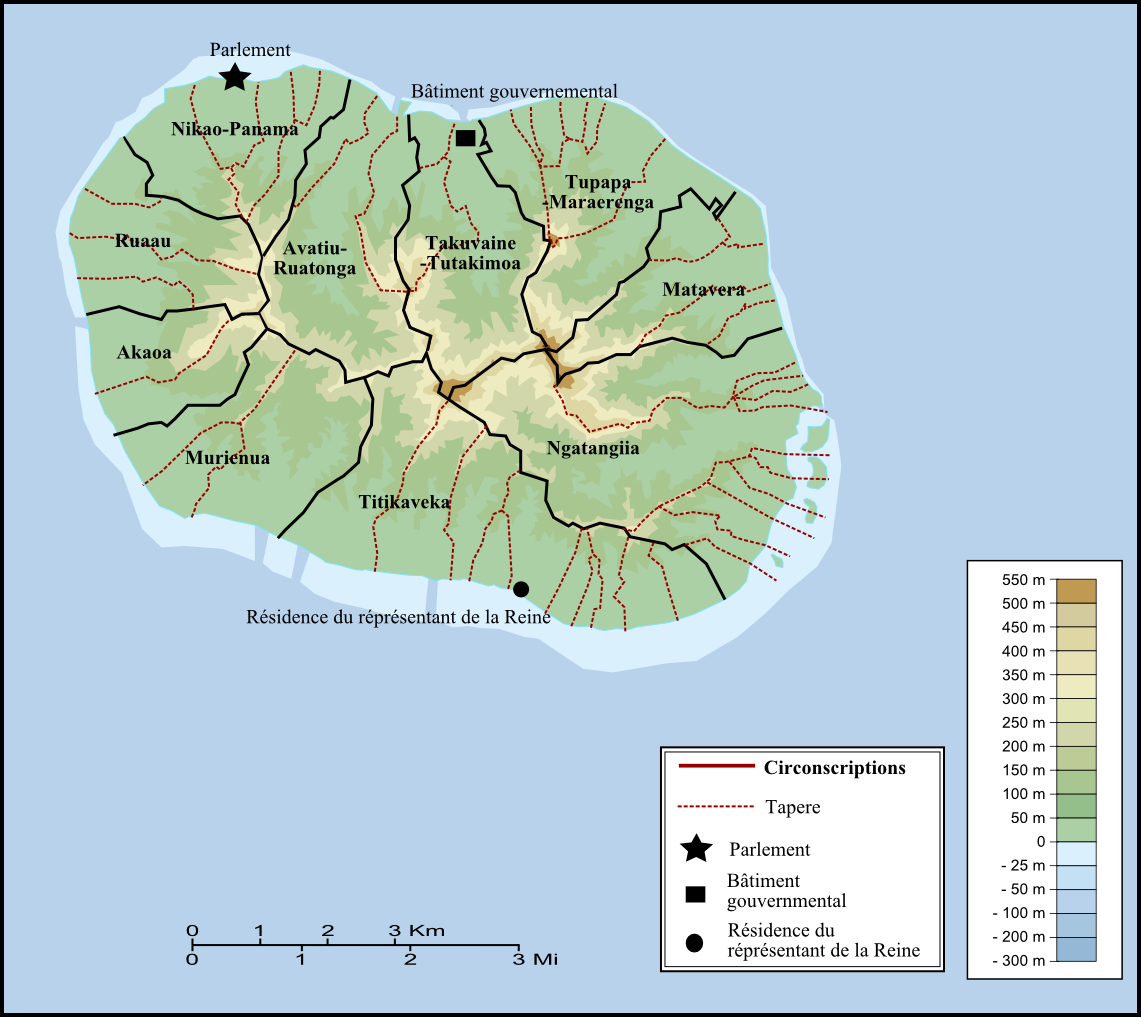
- Region: Rarotonga

Current constituency
- Created: 1981
- Number of members: 1
- Member: Tamaiti Maru Willie
- Created from: Takitumu

Tupapa–Maraerenga is a Cook Islands electoral division returning one member to the Cook Islands Parliament.

The electorate was created in 1981, when the Constitution Amendment (No. 9) Act 1980–1981 adjusted electorate boundaries and split the electorate of Takitumu into three. It consists of the tapere of Ngatipa, Vaikai, Tapae-i-Uta, Pue, Punataia, Kiikii and Tupapa on the island of Rarotonga.

== Members of Parliament ==
Election	Member	Party
1994, 1999, 2004	Tupou Faireka	Cook Islands Party
2006	John Tangi	Democratic Party
2010	George Angene	Cook Islands Party
2014, 2018	George Angene	One Cook Islands Movement
2022	George Angene	Cook Islands Party
2026	Tamaiti Maru Willie	Cook Islands Party

== Election results ==
2026 Cook Islands general election: Tupapa–Maraerenga
Party	Candidate	Votes	%	±%
Cook Islands	Tamaiti Maru Willie	617	64.2	
Cook Islands United	Rota Tama Williams	227	23.6	
Democratic	Edward Drollett	117	12.2	
Turnout		961		
Cook Islands hold		Swing		
^{†} incumbent
