= Takuvaine–Tutakimoa =

Electoral division in the Cook Islands

- Constituency for the Parliament of the Cook Islands
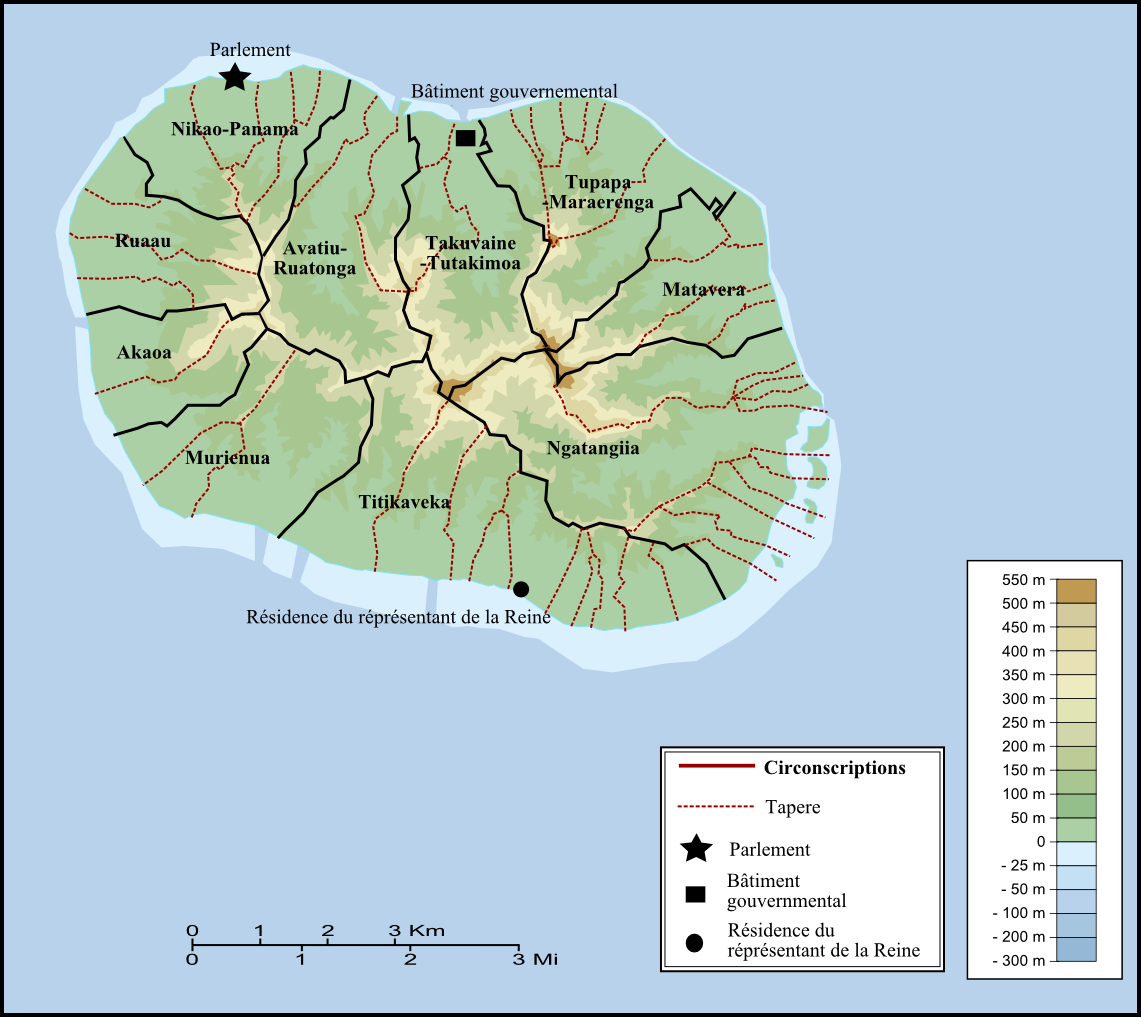
- Region: Rarotonga

Current constituency
- Created: 1981
- Number of members: 1
- Member: Mark Brown
- Created from: Takitumu

Takuvaine–Tutakimoa is a Cook Islands electoral division returning one member to the Cook Islands Parliament.

The electorate was created in 1981, when the Constitution Amendment (No. 9) Act 1980–1981 adjusted electorate boundaries and split the electorate of Takitumu into three. It consists of the tapere of Tutakimoa, Tauae, and Takuvaine on the island of Rarotonga.

== Members of Parliament ==
Election	Member	Party
1983 (Mar), 1983 (Nov), 1989, 1994, 1999, 2004	Geoffrey Henry	Cook Islands Party
2006	Ngai Tupa	Democratic Party
2010, 2014, 2018, 2022, 2026	Mark Brown	Cook Islands Party

== Election results ==
2026 Cook Islands general election: Takuvaine–Tutakimoa
Party	Candidate	Votes	%	±%
Cook Islands	Mark Brown^{†}	312	60.2	
Democratic	Davina Hosking-Ashford	115	22.2	
Cook Islands United	Venetia Mere Jacqueline Tuara	91	17.6	
Turnout		518		
Cook Islands hold		Swing		
^{†} incumbent
