= Tina Pupuke-Browne =

Cook Islands politician

Member of the Cook Islands Parliament for Rakahanga
- In office 14 June 2018 – 25 June 2026
- Preceded by: Toka Hagai
- Succeeded by: Levi Hitarahera Teinaki

Personal details
- Born: 4 April 1955 (age 71) Aitutaki, Cook Islands
- Party: Democratic Party
- Education: University of Canterbury

Tina Pupuke-Browne (born 4 April 1955) is a Cook Islands politician and a member of the Cook Islands Parliament. She is the leader of the Democratic Party.

== Career ==
Brown was born in 1955 and is from the island of Rakahanga and is the daughter of former Cook Islands Prime Minister Pupuke Robati. She was educated at Tereora College and then attended the University of Canterbury in Christchurch, New Zealand, graduating with a Bachelor of Laws in 1979 – the first woman from Rarotonga to do so. She subsequently worked for New Zealand law firm Russell McVeagh. She returned to the Cook Islands in 1981 to work for the Crown Law Office before entering private practice. She served as president of the Cook Islands Netball Association.

Browne first entered politics in 1996, when she contested the Nikao-Panama by-election as a candidate for the Cook Islands Party. She was defeated by Ngamau Munokoa.

She was elected as leader of the Democratic Party in April 2017, replacing William (Smiley) Heather. In the 2018 election she contested the seat of Rakahanga, losing to the Cook Islands Party's Toka Hagai. Hagai subsequently resigned the seat following allegations of treating, and Browne won it following an electoral petition.

In December 2019 she was part of a protest by women MPs to permit the wearing of ei katu (floral crowns) in Parliament.

In April 2020, she led several MPs in taking a pay cut during the COVID-19 pandemic. During 2020 she supported the government's efforts to prevent the spread of covid to the Cook Islands, and later opposed the government's lifting of quarantine.

In March 2021, she joined the government in opposing a 10-year moratorium on seabed mining.

She was re-elected at the 2022 Cook Islands general election. However, she lost her seat at the 2026 general election, with no Democratic Party candidates being elected to parliament.
