= Amuri–Ureia =

Cook Islands electoral division

- Constituency for the Parliament of the Cook Islands
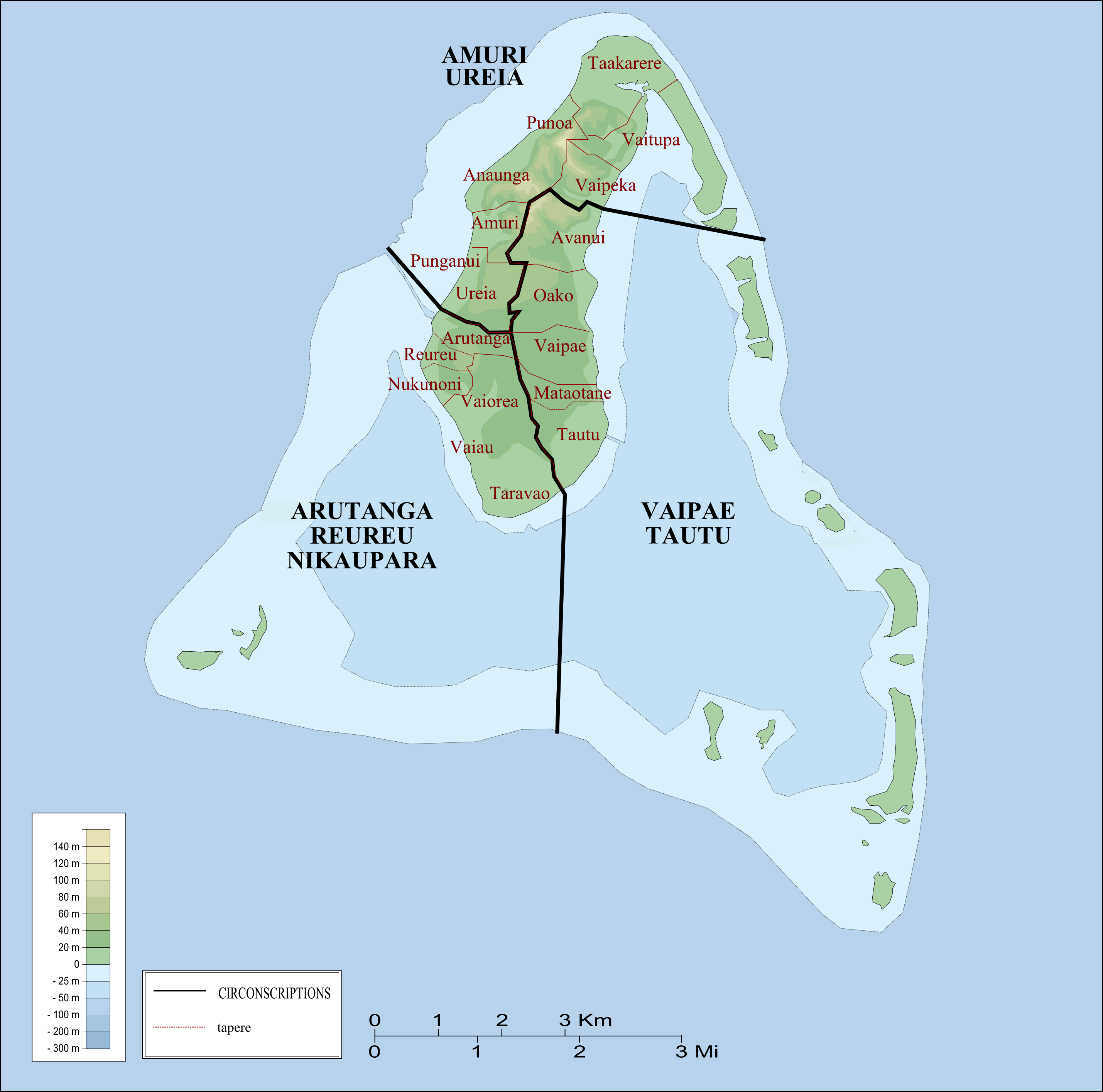
- Region: Aitutaki

Current constituency
- Created: 1981
- Number of members: 1
- Member: Toanui Isamaela

Amuri–Ureia is a Cook Islands electoral division returning one member to the Cook Islands Parliament. Its current representative is Toanui Isamaela, who has held the seat since 2022 and previously between 2010 and 2018.

The electorate was created in 1981, when the Constitution Amendment (No. 9) Act 1980 adjusted electorate boundaries and split the electorate of Aitutaki into three. It originally consisted of the Tapere of Punoua, Anaunga, Punganui, Ureia, and Amuri on the island of Aitutaki, but has since been expanded to also include the Tapere of Taakarere, Vaitupa, and Vaipeka and the Motu of Akitua.

== Members of Parliament for Amuri-Ureia ==
Unless otherwise stated, all MPs terms began and ended at general elections.

Name	Party	Elected	Left Office	Reason
Paora Teiti	Cook Islands Party	1994, 1999	2004	Unknown
Terepai Maoate Jnr	Democratic Party	2004, 2006	2010	Defeated
Toanui Isamaela	Cook Islands Party	2010, 2014	2018	Defeated
Terepai Maoate Jnr	Democratic Party	2018	2022	Defeated
Toanui Isamaela	One Cook Islands Movement	2022		
Toanui Isamaela	Cook Islands Party	2026		

== Election results ==
2026 Cook Islands general election: Amuri–Ureia
Party	Candidate	Votes	%	±%
Cook Islands	Toanui Isamaela^{†}	165	41.9	
Democratic	Terepai Maoate Jnr	106	26.9	
Independent	Nicholas Royle Henry	98	24.9	
Cook Islands United	Tumutoa Teariki Nicholls	25	6.3	
Turnout		394		
Cook Islands gain from One Cook Islands		Swing		
^{†} incumbent

2022 Cook Islands general election: Amuri-Ureia
Party	Candidate	Votes	%	±%
One Cook Islands	Toanui Isamaela	126	35.9	+35.9
Democratic	Terepai Maoate Jnr	123	35.0	−24.3
Cook Islands	Nicholas Henry	102	29.1	−11.6
Turnout		351		
One Cook Islands gain from Democratic		Swing	+30.1	

2006 Cook Islands general election: Amuri-Ureia
Party	Candidate	Votes	%	±%
Democratic	Terepai Maoate Jnr	214	56.6	
Cook Islands	John Baxter	164	43.4	
Turnout		378	88.1	

2004 Cook Islands general election: Amuri-Ureia
Party	Candidate	Votes	%	±%
Democratic	Terepai Maoate Jnr	185	50.7	
Cook Islands	Teokotai Herman	175	47.9	
Independent	Kiria Kiria	5	1.4	
Turnout		365	97.0	
