= Arutanga–Reureu–Nikaupara =

Cook Islands electoral division

- Constituency for the Parliament of the Cook Islands
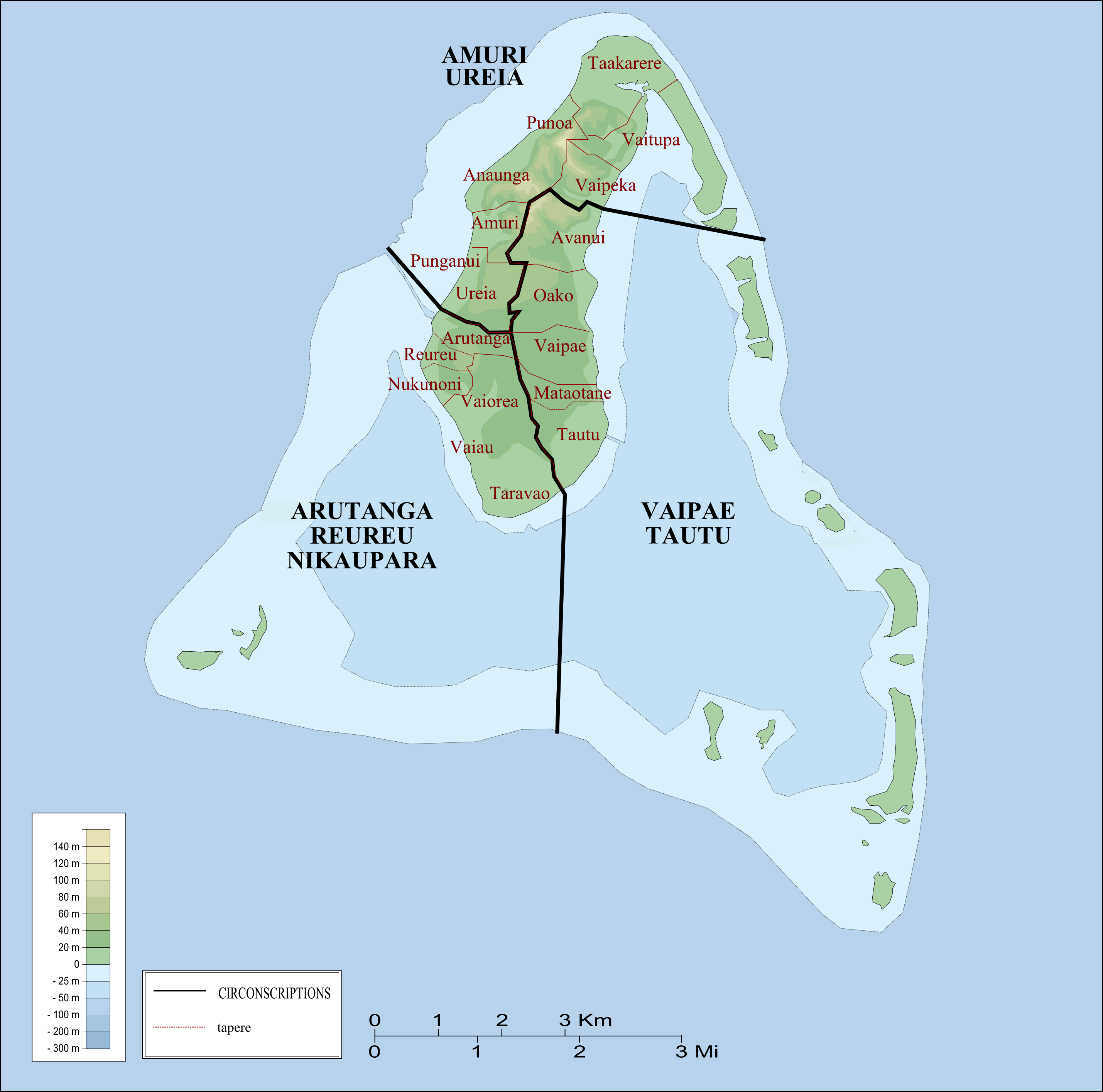
- Region: Aitutaki

Current constituency
- Created: 1981
- Number of members: 1
- Member: Tereapii Maki-Kavana
- Created from: Aitutaki

Arutanga–Reureu–Nikaupara is a Cook Islands electoral division returning one member to the Cook Islands Parliament. Its current representative is Tereapii Maki-Kavana, who has held the seat since 2018.

The electorate was created in 1981, when the Constitution Amendment (No. 9) Act 1980-1981 adjusted electorate boundaries and split the electorate of Aitutaki into three.

== Members of Parliament for Arutanga-Reureu-Nikaupara ==
Unless otherwise stated, all MPs terms began and ended at general elections.

| Election | Member | Party |
|---|---|---|
| 1989, 1994 | Ngereteina Puna | Cook Islands Party |
| 1999, 2003, 2004, 2006, 2010 | Teina Bishop | Cook Islands Party |
| 2014 | Teina Bishop | One Cook Islands Movement |
| 2016 byelection | Pumati Israela | One Cook Islands Movement |
| 2018, 2022, 2026 | Tereapii Maki-Kavana | Cook Islands Party |

== Election results ==
2026 Cook Islands general election: Arutanga–Reureu–Nikaupara
| Party | Candidate | Votes | % | ±% |
|---|---|---|---|---|
| Cook Islands | Tereapii Maki-Kavana^{†} | 179 | 46.7 | |
| Cook Islands United | Maitoe Henry | 113 | 29.5 | |
| Independent | Tekura Moeroa Bishop | 91 | 23.8 | |
| Turnout | | 383 | | |
| Cook Islands hold | | Swing | | |
^{†} incumbent

2022 Cook Islands general election: Arutanga-Reureu-Nikaupara
| Party | Candidate | Votes | % | ±% |
|---|---|---|---|---|
| Cook Islands | Tereapii Maki-Kavana | 206 | 57.4 | +5.8 |
| One Cook Islands | Teinakore Bishop | 111 | 30.9 | +17.5 |
| Democratic | Atina Currie | 42 | 11.7 | +11.7 |
| Turnout | | 359 | | |
| Cook Islands hold | | Swing | −11.7 | |
