= Matavera (electorate) =

Electoral division of the Cook Islands

- Constituency for the Parliament of the Cook Islands
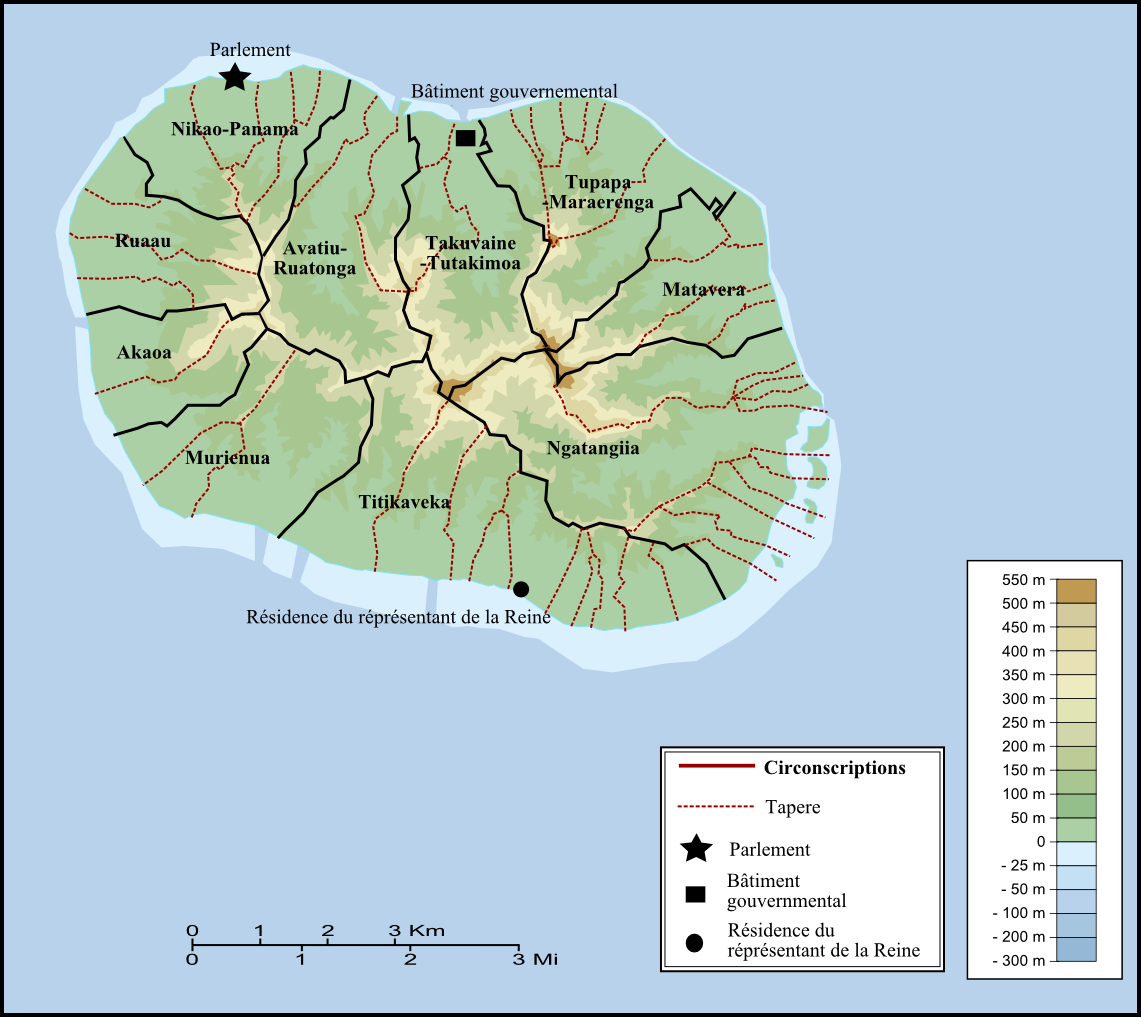
- Region: Rarotonga

Current constituency
- Created: 1981
- Number of members: 1
- Member: Taneao Ngamata
- Created from: Takitumu

Matavera is a Cook Islands electoral division returning one member to the Cook Islands Parliament.

The electorate was created in 1981, when the Constitution Amendment (No. 9) Act 1980–1981 adjusted electorate boundaries and split the electorate of Takitumu into three. It consists of the tapere of Titama, Tupapa, Matavera, Pouara, and Vaenga on the island of Rarotonga.

== Members of Parliament ==
Election	Member	Party
1983 (Mar), 1983 (Nov)	William Cowan	Democratic Party
1994	Mataio Mataio Aperau	Unknown
1999, 2004	Peri Vaevae Pare	Democratic Party
2006 by-election	Kiriau Turepu	Cook Islands Party
2006	Cassey Eggelton	Democratic Party
2010, 2014	Kiriau Turepu	Cook Islands Party
2018, 2022	Vaitoti Tupa	Democratic Party
2026	Taneao Ngamata	Cook Islands United Party

== Election results ==
2026 Cook Islands general election: Matavera
Party	Candidate	Votes	%	±%
Cook Islands United	Taneao Ngamata	240	37.7	
Democratic	Vaitoti Tupa^{†}	231	36.3	
Cook Islands	Aneru Andrew Tautu	166	26.1	
Turnout		637		
Cook Islands United gain from Democratic		Swing		
^{†} incumbent
