= Albert Nicholas (politician, born 1971) =

Cook Islands politician (born 1971)

Albert Nicholas MP
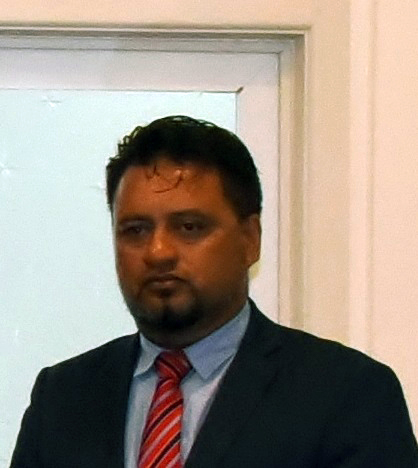
- Nicholas in 2017

Deputy Prime Minister of the Cook Islands
- Incumbent
- Assumed office 16 February 2024
- Prime Minister: Mark Brown
- Preceded by: Robert Tapaitau

Minister of National Environment Services
- Incumbent
- Assumed office 23 December 2022
- Preceded by: Robert Tapaitau

Minister of Infrastructure & Planning
- Incumbent
- Assumed office 23 December 2022
- Preceded by: Robert Tapaitau

Minister of Internal Affairs
- In office 15 March 2015 – 21 September 2018
- Prime Minister: Henry Puna
- Preceded by: Nandi Glassie
- Succeeded by: Vaine Mokoroa

Member of the Cook Islands Parliament for Avatiu–Ruatonga–Palmerston
- Incumbent
- Assumed office 9 July 2014
- Preceded by: John Henry

Personal details
- Born: 2 September 1971 (age 55)
- Party: Democratic Party; Cook Islands Party
- Relations: Albert (Peto) Nicholas

Albert Taaviri Kaitara Nicholas (born 2 September 1971) is a Cook Islands politician and former Cabinet Minister. He is a member of the Cook Islands Party. He is the son of former MP Albert (Peto) Nicholas.

Nicholas was born on Rarotonga and educated at Avarua School and Tereora College. He worked as a public servant for Customs before becoming self-employed. He first elected to parliament in the 2014 election as a representative of the Democratic Party. He represents the seat of Avatiu–Ruatonga–Palmerston.

In March 2015, Nicholas switched his support to the government of Henry Puna in exchange for a cabinet post as Minister of Internal Affairs, Youth and Sport, the Ombudsman, and the Punanga Nui market. He was subsequently expelled from the Democratic Party.

In 2016, he was part of the Cook Islands' delegation to the second Pacific Parliamentary Forum in Wellington, New Zealand. In April 2017 he resigned from parliament in order to end speculation over his defection from the Democrats. He was re-elected in the resulting 2017 Avatiu–Ruatonga–Palmerston by-election.

He was re-elected at the 2018 election. On 21 September 2018 Nicholas was sacked from cabinet without explanation while overseas for health reasons. He was replaced by Vaine Mokoroa.

In January 2019, Nicholas was charged in New Zealand with "unlawfully taking a motor vehicle", a rental car. He entered a plea of not guilty the following month, and was released on bail, returning to the Cook Islands. He failed to appear at a second hearing at Manukau District Court on 26 March, resulting in an arrest warrant being issued. He was nonetheless sworn back into parliament on 9 April. As of June 2019, the arrest warrant remains active, and Nicholas will be arrested if he returns to New Zealand.

In February 2020 Nicholas was seriously injured in a car accident. In March 2020 Nicholas admitted that he had pledged his support to the government of Henry Puna in exchange for a bridge being built in his electorate.

Following the election of Mark Brown as Prime Minister he was appointed Associate Minister for the Cook Islands Investment Corporation.

He was re-elected at the 2022 Cook Islands general election. In December 2022 he was appointed to Cabinet as Minister of Infrastructure, and National Environmental Services.

In February 2024 following the conviction of Robert Tapaitau for fraud he was appointed Deputy Prime Minister of the Cook Islands.

Nicholas won re-election at the 2026 general election.
