= Akaoa =

Electoral division of the Cook Islands

- Constituency for the Parliament of the Cook Islands
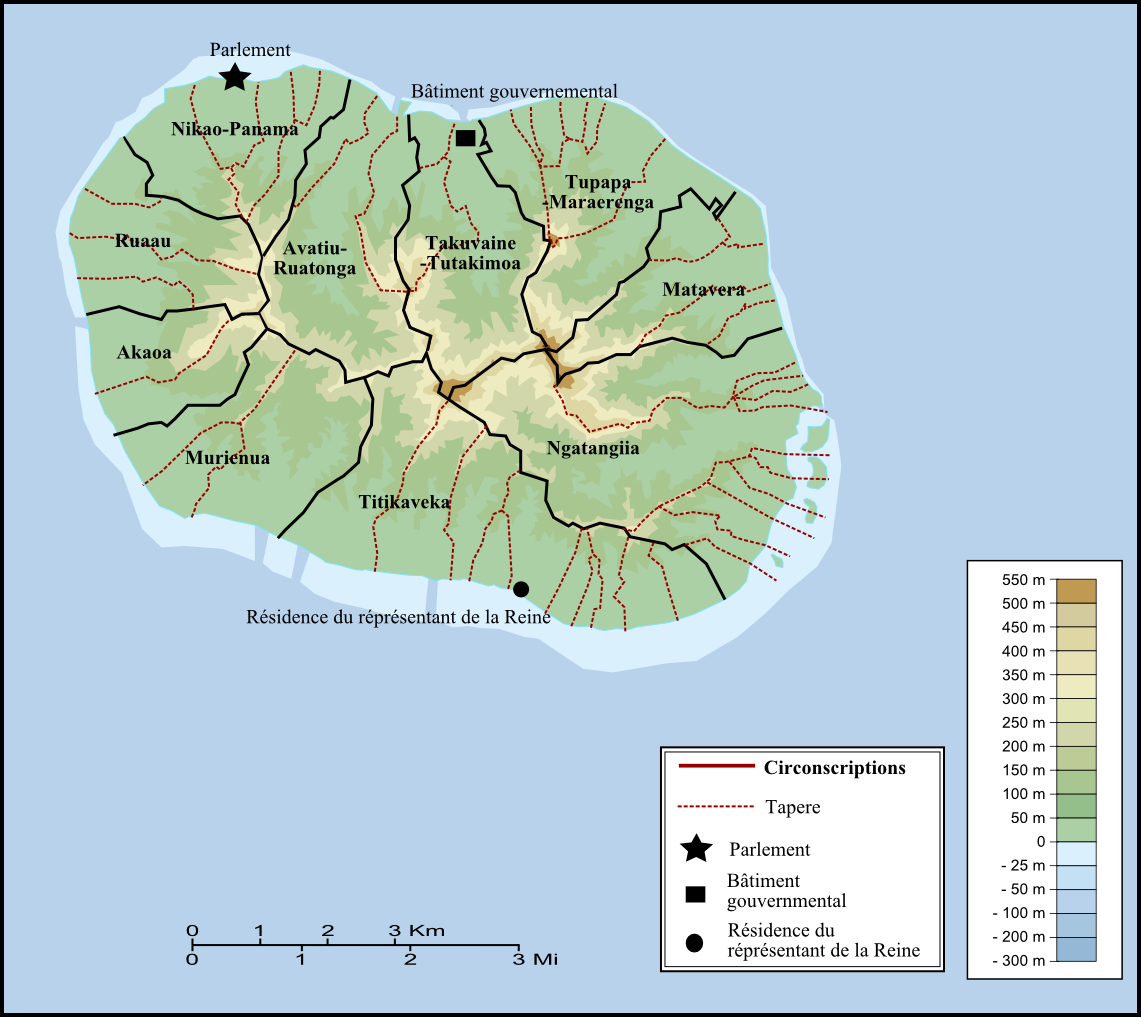
- Region: Rarotonga

Current constituency
- Created: 1991
- Number of members: 1
- Member: Robert Stanley Heather
- Created from: Murienua

Akaoa is a Cook Islands electoral division returning one member to the Cook Islands Parliament.

The electorate was created in 1991, when the Constitution Amendment (No.14) Act 1991 split the electorate of Murienua in half. It consists of the tapere of Akaoa and Vaiakura on the island of Rarotonga.

== Members of Parliament for Akaoa ==
Unless otherwise stated, all MPs terms began and ended at general elections.

Election	Member	Party
1994	Utia Matata	Unknown
1999	Teremoana Tapi Taio	Democratic Party
2004, 2006, 2006 by-election, 2010, 2014	Teariki Heather	Cook Islands Party
2018	Nooroa o Teariki Baker	Democratic Party
2022, 2026	Robert Stanley Heather	Cook Islands United Party

== Election results ==
=== 2026 election ===
2026 Cook Islands general election: Akaoa
Party	Candidate	Votes	%	±%
Cook Islands United	Robert Stanley Heather	324	82.7	
Cook Islands	Teakaau Tex Tangimetua	68	17.3	
Turnout		392		
Cook Islands United hold		Swing		

=== 2022 election ===
2022 Cook Islands general election: Akaoa
Party	Candidate	Votes	%	±%
Cook Islands United	Robert Heather	195	49.1	+49.1
Democratic	Nooroa o Teariki Baker	145	36.5	−17.3
Cook Islands	Doreen Boggs	57	14.4	−31.8
Turnout		397		
Cook Islands United gain from Democratic		Swing	+33.2	

=== 2018 election ===
2018 Cook Islands general election
Party	Candidate	Votes	%	±%
Democratic	Nooroa o Teariki Baker	233	53.8	+5.9
Cook Islands	Teariki Heather	200	46.2	−5.9
Democratic gain from Cook Islands		Swing	+5.9	

=== 2014 election ===
2014 Cook Islands general election
Party	Candidate	Votes	%	±%
Cook Islands	Teariki Heather	201	52.1	−3.3
Democratic	Nooroa o Teariki Baker	185	47.9	+3.3
Cook Islands hold		Swing	+3.3	

=== 2010 election ===
2010 Cook Islands general election
Party	Candidate	Votes	%	±%
Cook Islands	Teariki Heather	186	55.4	+1.4
Democratic	Teremoana Tapi Taio	150	44.6	+6.5
Cook Islands hold		Swing	-4.0	

=== 2006 by-election ===
2006 Akaoa by-election
Party	Candidate	Votes	%	±%
Cook Islands	Teariki Heather	204	54.0	+4.0
Democratic	Keu Mataroa	174	46.0	−4.0
Cook Islands hold		Swing	+4.0	
Turnout		378		

=== 2006 election ===
2006 Cook Islands general election: Akaoa
Party	Candidate	Votes	%	±%
Cook Islands	Teariki Heather	179	50.0	
Democratic	Keu Mataroa	179	50.0	
Cook Islands hold		Swing	-3.3	
Turnout		358	85.2	

=== 2004 election ===
2004 Cook Islands general election: Akaoa
Party	Candidate	Votes	%	±%
Cook Islands	Teariki Heather	188	54.3	
Democratic	Teremoana Tapi Taio	158	45.7	
Cook Islands hold		Swing		
Turnout		346	75.5	
