= Wesley Kareroa =

Cook Islands politician

Member of the Cook Islands Parliament for Oneroa
- In office 9 July 2014 – 25 June 2026
- Preceded by: Winton Pickering
- Succeeded by: Rimmel Poila-Mokoroa

Personal details
- Born: 15 November 1967 (age 58)
- Party: Cook Islands Democratic Party

Wesley Kareroa (born 15 November 1967) is a Cook Islands politician and member of the Cook Islands Parliament. He is a member of the Cook Islands Democratic Party.

Kareroa was born on Rarotonga and educated at Mangaia Primary School and Mangaia College. He worked as an agent for Air Rarotonga. He was first elected to Parliament in the 2014 Cook Islands general election. After the election he was reportedly offered a ministerial position by Prime Minister Henry Puna in exchange for supporting him in the House, but refused. He was re-elected in the 2018 election.

In February 2020 he was appointed Democratic Party spokesperson on National Superannuation and Parliamentary Services.

He was re-elected at the 2022 Cook Islands general election.

Kareroa lost his seat at the 2026 general election, with no Democratic Party candidates being elected to parliament.
