= Progressive Party of the Cook Islands =

Political Party in the Cook Islands

- Abbreviation: PPCI
- Leader: Te Tuhi Kelly
- Founded: October 2019
- Seats in the Cook Islands Parliament: 0 / 24

Website
- Official Facebook page

The Progressive Party of the Cook Islands is a political party in the Cook Islands. It was established in October 2019 and is led by public servant Te Tuhi Kelly. It advocates public service reform.

Party leader Kelly has posted statements sceptical of COVID-19 vaccines and vaccine mandates on the official party Facebook page.

The party won no seats in either the 2022 or 2026 elections.

== Electoral performance ==
=== Legislative Assembly ===
Election	Votes	%	Seats	+/–	Rank	Government
2022	18	0.20	0 / 24	New	▲5th	Extra-parliamentary
2026	53	0.58	0 / 24	Steady	4th	Extra-parliamentary
