= Oneroa (electorate) =

Cook Islands electoral division

- Constituency for the Parliament of the Cook Islands
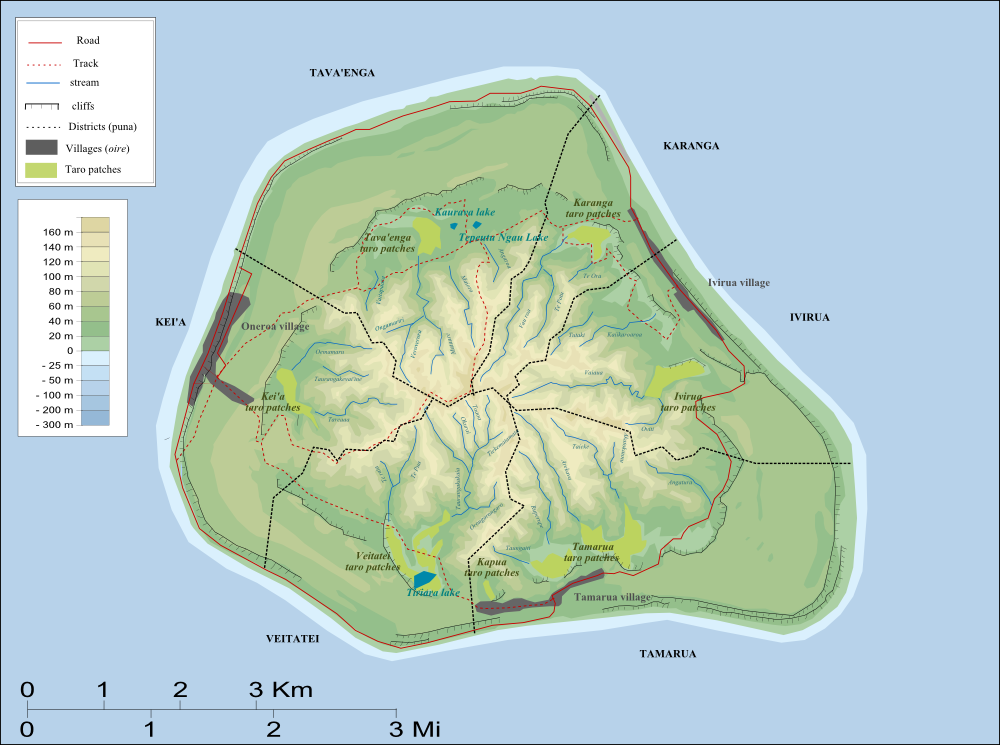
- Region: Mangaia

Current constituency
- Created: 1981
- Number of members: 1
- Member: Rimmel Poila-Mokoroa
- Created from: Mangaia

Oneroa is a Cook Islands electoral division returning one member to the Cook Islands Parliament. Its current representative is Rimmel Poila-Mokoroa, who has held the seat since 2026.

The electorate consists of the districts of Keia, Tavaenga, and Veitatei on the island of Mangaia. It was created in 1981, when the Constitution Amendment (No. 9) Act 1980–1981 adjusted electorate boundaries and split the electorate of Mangaia into three.

== Electoral results ==
2026 Cook Islands general election: Oneroa
Party	Candidate	Votes	%	±%
Independent	Rimmel Poila-Mokoroa	77	37.2	
Cook Islands	Teina Tearii	66	31.9	
Democratic	Wesley Kareroa^{†}	64	30.9	
Turnout		207		
Independent gain from Democratic		Swing		
^{†} incumbent

2018 Cook Islands general election
Party	Candidate	Votes	%	±%
Democratic	Wesley Kareroa	118	67.4	+3.8
Cook Islands	Teina Ngametuatoe	57	34.6	−1.8
Democratic hold		Swing	+3.8	

2014 Cook Islands general election
Party	Candidate	Votes	%	±%
Democratic	Wesley Kareroa	117	63.6	−5.1
Cook Islands	Poroaiti Arokapiti	67	36.4	+10.0
Democratic hold		Swing	-5.1	

2010 Cook Islands general election
Party	Candidate	Votes	%	±%
Democratic	Winton Pickering	113	58.5	−8.5
Cook Islands	Tangatataia Vavia	51	26.4	−16.0
Independent	Junior Areai Enoka	29	15.0	
Democratic hold		Swing	-8.5	

2006 Cook Islands general election
Party	Candidate	Votes	%	±%
Democratic	Winton Pickering	152	67.0	+11.1
Cook Islands	Papa Metu Ruatoe	75	33.0	+29.6
Democratic hold		Swing	+11.1	

2004 Cook Islands general election
Party	Candidate	Votes	%	±%
Democratic	Winton Pickering	132	55.9	
TE	Taata Tangatakino	96	40.7	
Cook Islands	Papamama Pokino	8	3.4	
Democratic gain from Cook Islands		Swing		
