= 2022 Cook Islands general election =

Cook Islands general election

- 1 August 2022
- All 24 seats in Parliament; 13 seats needed for a majority
Party	Leader	Vote %	Seats	+/–
Cook Islands	Mark Brown	44.07	12	+2
Democratic	Tina Browne	26.93	5	−6
Cook Islands United	Teariki Heather	18.81	3	New
One Cook Islands	George Turia	2.68	1	0
Independents	–	7.31	3	+1
This lists parties that won seats. See the complete results below.
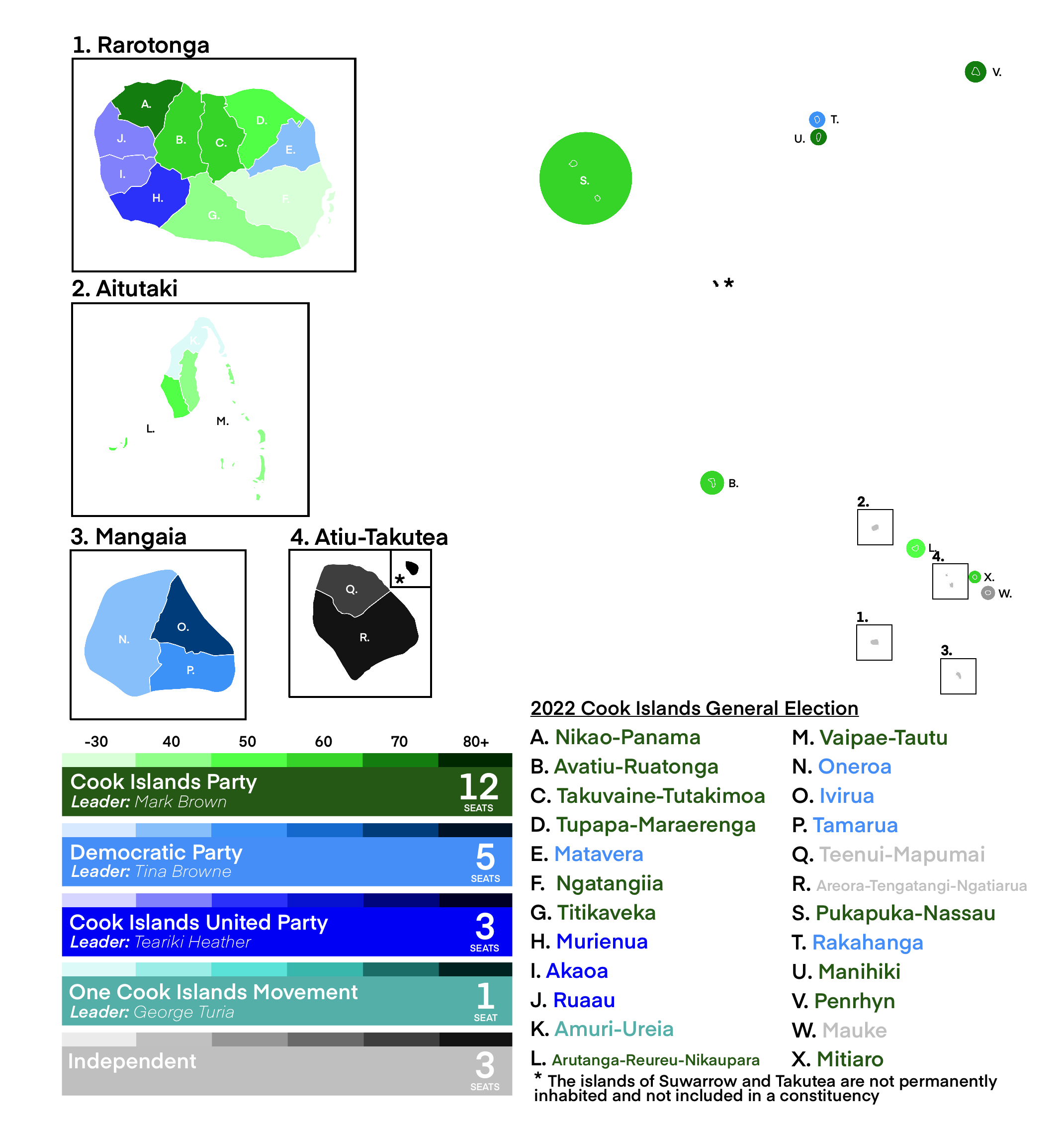
Results of the election by constituency.
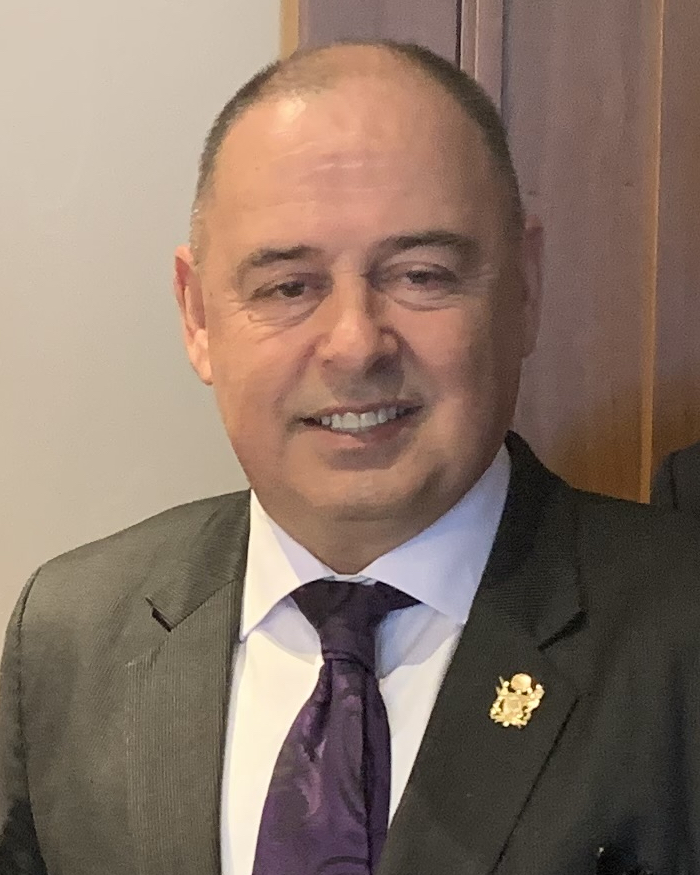

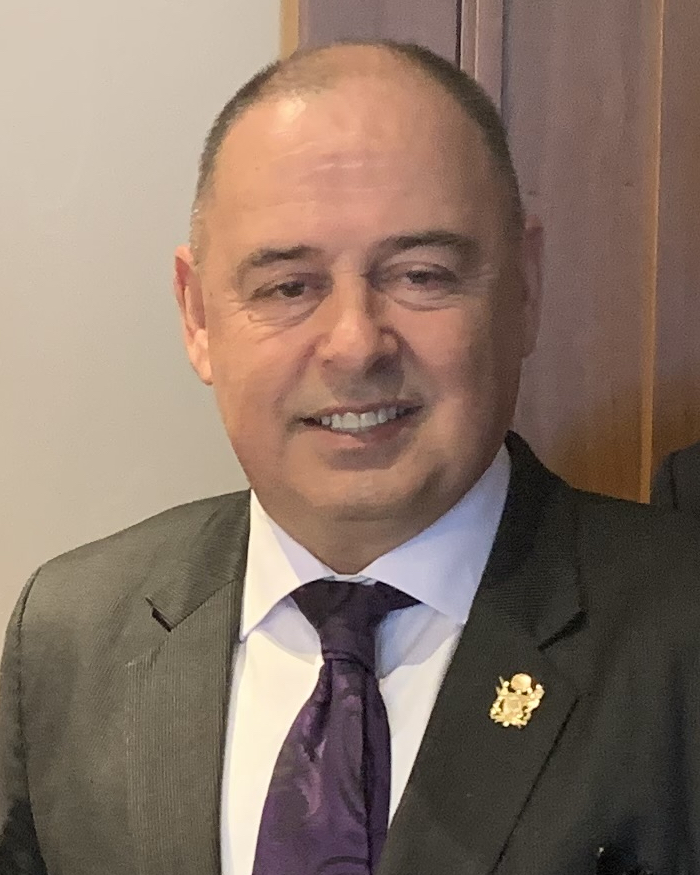
Prime Minister before	Prime Minister after election
Mark Brown; Cook Islands	Mark Brown; Cook Islands

General elections were held in the Cook Islands on 1 August 2022 to determine the composition of the 18th Parliament. A referendum on legalising medical cannabis was held on the same day.

== Background ==
In the 2018 general election the Democratic Party won a plurality with 11 seats but fell short of the 13 required to form a government. The incumbent Cook Islands Party (CIP), led by then-prime minister Henry Puna won 10 seats; the One Cook Islands Movement (OCI) secured a single seat, and independents won the remaining two. The CIP remained in government due to the support of the OCI and independents.

In October 2020, Puna resigned as prime minister to run for secretary-general of the Pacific Islands Forum. Deputy prime minister Mark Brown succeeded Puna as prime minister and leader of the Cook Islands Party. Brown appointed Robert Tapaitau deputy prime minister.

== Electoral system ==
The 24 members of the Parliament of the Cook Islands were elected from single-member electorates by first-past-the-post voting.

== Campaign ==
The Progressive Party of the Cook Islands was launched in October 2019 to contest the election.

The One Cook Islands Movement (OCI) announced its candidates in November 2021. However, they caused controversy by claiming Toanui Isamaela and Teina Bishop would stand as joint OCI–Democratic Party candidates; this was denied by the Democratic Party, which stated it would be announcing its own candidates and there was no alliance with the OCI.

In December 2021 the new Cook Islands United Party, founded by former Deputy Prime Minister Teariki Heather in 2018, announced eleven candidates for the elections.

== Opinion polls ==
=== Preferred prime minister ===
Pollster	Date	Sample size	Brown	Browne	Heather	Others	Undecided
Cook Islands News	July 2022	120	44.2%	10.8%	16.7%	14.2%	8.3%

== Results ==
Initial projections showed the Cook Islands Party with 10 seats, the Democrats with 6, the new Cook Islands United Party with 4, and independents with 3. The seat of Ngatangiia was tied, with the CIP and United candidates on 171 votes each. The final vote count showed the CIP with 12 seats, after it won Ngatangiia and Titikaveka, where the United Party candidate originally had had a six vote lead. The Democrats won five seats, United three, the One Cook Islands Movement one and independents three.

Party	Votes	%	+/–	Seats	+/–
Cook Islands Party	3,890	44.07	+1.77	12	+2
Democratic Party	2,377	26.93	-14.98	5	–6
Cook Islands United Party	1,660	18.81	New	3	New
One Cook Islands Movement	237	2.68	-8.13	1	0
Progressive Party of the Cook Islands	18	0.20	New	0	New
Independents	645	7.31	+3.54	3	+1
Total	8,827	100.00	–	24	0
Source: Parliament of the Cook Islands

=== By electorate ===
Constituency	Candidate	Party	Votes	%
Akaoa	Robert Stanley Heather	Cook Islands United	195	49.24
Akaoa	Nooroa Baker	Democratic	144	36.36
Akaoa	Doreen Tuainekore Boggs	Cook Islands	57	14.39
Amuri–Ureia	Toanui Isamaela	One Cook Islands	126	35.90
Amuri–Ureia	Terepai Maoate	Democratic	123	35.04
Amuri–Ureia	Nicholas Royle Henry	Cook Islands	102	29.06
Arutanga–Reureu–Nikaupara	Tereapii Maki-Kavana	Cook Islands	206	57.38
Arutanga–Reureu–Nikaupara	Teinakore Bishop	One Cook Islands	111	30.92
Arutanga–Reureu–Nikaupara	Atina Currie	Democratic	42	11.70
Avatiu–Ruatonga–Palmerston	Albert Nicholas	Cook Islands	358	60.68
Avatiu–Ruatonga–Palmerston	Teina Rongo	Democratic	195	33.05
Avatiu–Ruatonga–Palmerston	Makiroa Tutai-Louis Mitchell	Cook Islands United	37	6.27
Ivirua	Agnes Armstrong	Democratic	57	72.15
Ivirua	Marouna Pakuru	Cook Islands	12	15.19
Ivirua	Ngametua Angai Peraua	Cook Islands United	10	12.66
Manihiki	Akaiti Puna	Cook Islands	89	72.95
Manihiki	Mokoha Johnson	Democratic	24	19.67
Manihiki	Apolo Miria	Cook Islands United	9	7.38
Matavera	Vaitoti Tupa	Democratic	261	43.57
Matavera	Taneao Ngamata	Independent	183	30.55
Matavera	Harriet Tangi Williams	Cook Islands	93	15.53
Matavera	Saula Atera	Cook Islands United	62	10.35
Mauke	Stephen Matapo	Independent	92	50.83
Mauke	Eileen Story	Cook Islands	62	34.25
Mauke	Tungane Williams	Independent	16	8.84
Mauke	Lotiola Mateariki	Cook Islands United	11	6.08
Mitiaro	Tuakeu Tangatapoto	Cook Islands	62	69.66
Mitiaro	Paul Raui Pokoati Allsworth	Cook Islands United	26	29.21
Mitiaro	Louise Akerongo Utanga	Democratic	1	1.12
Murienua	Teariki Heather	Cook Islands United	265	55.09
Murienua	Patrick Akaiti Arioka	Cook Islands	169	35.14
Murienua	Piltz Tetevano Napa	Democratic	47	9.77
Ngatangiia	Tukaka Ama	Cook Islands	202	36.86
Ngatangiia	Mapi Ioteva	Cook Islands United	191	34.85
Ngatangiia	Tamaiva Tuavera	Democratic	155	28.28
Nikao–Panama	Vaine Mokoroa	Cook Islands	543	70.43
Nikao–Panama	Ngamau Mere Munokoa	Democratic	210	27.24
Nikao–Panama	Te Tuhi Tauratumaru Kelly	Progressive	18	2.33
Oneroa	Wesley Kareroa	Democratic	84	42.21
Oneroa	Poroaiti Arokapiti	Cook Islands	69	34.67
Oneroa	Travel Tangimokopuna Moeara	Cook Islands United	46	23.12
Penrhyn	Robert Tapaitau	Cook Islands	91	75.21
Penrhyn	Tex Teakaau Tangimetua	Independent	23	19.01
Penrhyn	Jimmy Temu Marsters	Cook Islands United	7	5.79
Pukapuka–Nassau	Tingika Elikana	Cook Islands	199	69.58
Pukapuka–Nassau	Willie Pareura Katoa	Democratic	87	30.42
Rakahanga	Tina Browne	Democratic	44	58.67
Rakahanga	Toka Hagai	Cook Islands	31	41.33
Ruaau	Tim Tunui Varu	Cook Islands United	291	41.04
Ruaau	Arama Wichman	Cook Islands	267	37.66
Ruaau	William Heather	Democratic	151	21.30
Takuvaine–Tutakimoa	Mark Brown	Cook Islands	277	61.01
Takuvaine–Tutakimoa	Davina Hosking-Ashford	Democratic	124	27.31
Takuvaine–Tutakimoa	Teokotai-O-George George	Cook Islands United	53	11.67
Tamarua	Tetangi Matapo	Democratic	30	57.69
Tamarua	Lana Aitau	Cook Islands	22	42.31
Teenui–Mapumai	Rose Toki-Brown	Independent	87	73.73
Teenui–Mapumai	Nooroa Paratainga	Cook Islands United	31	26.27
Tengatangi–Areora–Ngatiarua	Te-Hani Brown	Independent	104	82.54
Tengatangi–Areora–Ngatiarua	Vainetutai Boaza	Cook Islands United	22	17.46
Titikaveka	Sonny Williams	Cook Islands	231	31.22
Titikaveka	Margharet Matenga	Cook Islands United	228	30.81
Titikaveka	Selina Napa	Democratic	212	28.65
Titikaveka	Teava Iro	Independent	69	9.32
Tupapa–Maraerenga	George Angene	Cook Islands	570	56.60
Tupapa–Maraerenga	Lee Harmon	Democratic	261	25.92
Tupapa–Maraerenga	Kervin Tetutamaiti Aroita	Cook Islands United	176	17.48
Vaipae–Tautu	Teokotai Herman	Cook Islands	178	47.59
Vaipae–Tautu	Teinakore Manuela	Democratic	125	33.42
Vaipae–Tautu	Teariki George	Independent	71	18.98

== Aftermath ==
The CIP began coalition talks on 4 August, and announced that it planned to continue its arrangements with two independents. The United Party ruled out working with the CIP. On 5 August the CIP announced they had secured the support of independents Te-Hani Brown and Rose Toki-Brown for a governing coalition. On 12 August Mark Brown was reappointed Prime Minister. On 25 August 2022 independent MP Stephen Matapo joined the Cook Islands Party, giving the government a total of 15 seats.

Following the election, electoral petitions were filed challenging the results in Mitiaro, Tengatangi–Areora–Ngatiarua, Teenui–Mapumai, Titikaveka and Amuri–Ureia, as well as an application for a recount in Tupapa–Maraerenga. Due to the time taken to resolve the petitions, the Cook Islands Parliament did not sit for the rest of the year, and will not sit until at least March 2023.

The final electoral petition was not resolved until 11 March 2023, when the High Court confirmed that Sonny Williams had won the seat of Titikaveka. Parliament sat for the first time and new MPs were sworn in on 21 March 2023.
