= Tai Tura =

Cook Islands politician (born 1949)

11th Speaker of the Cook Islands Parliament
- Incumbent
- Assumed office 22 March 2021
- Preceded by: Niki Rattle

Deputy Speaker of the Parliament of the Cook Islands
- In office 9 April 2019 – 9 February 2024
- Preceded by: Toka Hagai
- Succeeded by: Tuakeu Tangatapoto

Member of the Cook Islands Parliament for Mauke
- In office 17 November 2010 – 1 August 2022
- Preceded by: Mapu Taia
- Succeeded by: Stephen Matapo

Personal details
- Party: Cook Islands Party

Tutai Tura (born 3 October 1949) is a Cook Islands politician and former member of the Cook Islands Parliament. Since March 2021 he has been Speaker of the Cook Islands Parliament. He is a member of the Cook Islands Party.

Tura was born on Rarotonga, and educated at Avarua School and Tereora College. He trained as an electrician and worked for the government on Mauke. He was first elected to Parliament at the 2010 election. Shortly after his election he called for wage increases to counteract the higher cost of living in Mauke. In 2015 he was appointed Associate Minister for Foreign Affairs and Immigration.

In April 2019 Tura was appointed Deputy Speaker. In June 2020 he attempted to ban a Cook Islands News journalist from Parliament over a story about MPs' allowances.

On 22 March 2021 Tura was elected Speaker, succeeding Niki Rattle.

He did not stand at the 2022 Cook Islands general election.
