= Tereapii Maki-Kavana =

Member of the Cook Islands Parliament for Arutanga–Reureu–Nikaupara
- Incumbent
- Assumed office 14 June 2018
- Preceded by: Pumati Israela

Personal details
- Born: 18 January 1963 (age 63)
- Party: Cook Islands Party

Tereapii Maki-Kavana (born 18 January 1963) is a Cook Islands politician and member of the Cook Islands Parliament. He is a member of the Cook Islands Party.

Maki-Kavana is from Aitutaki and was educated at Vaitau School and Araura College. He worked as a banker for the Post Office, Cook Islands Savings Bank, and Bank of the Cook Islands.

He was first elected to Parliament at the 2018 election. He is a Seventh day Adventist. He was re-elected at the 2022 Cook Islands general election, and again at the 2026 general election.
