= Mark Brown (Cook Islands politician) =

Prime Minister of the Cook Islands (2020–present)

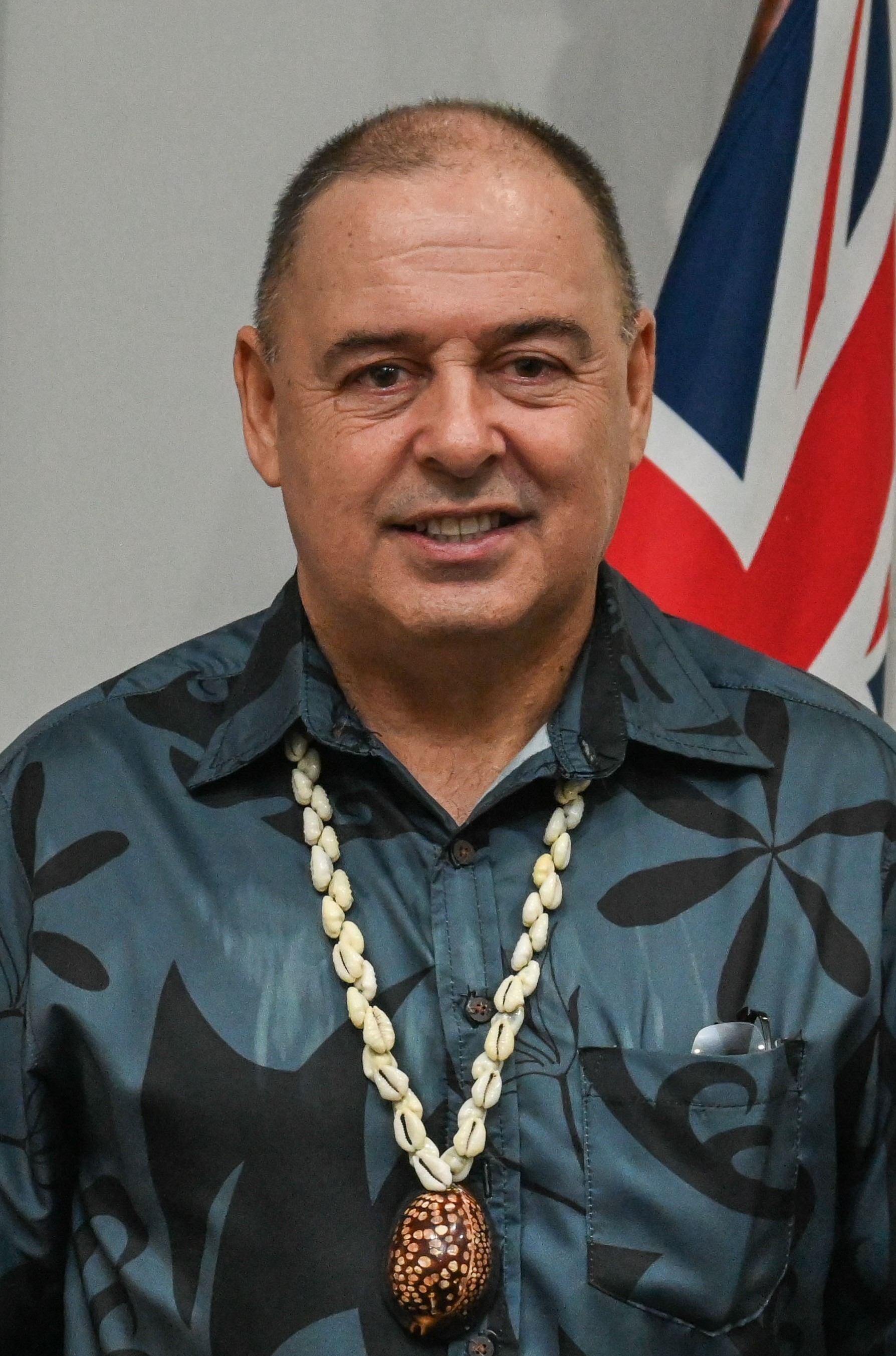
- Brown in 2023

12th Prime Minister of the Cook Islands
- Incumbent
- Assumed office 1 October 2020
- Monarchs: Elizabeth II; Charles III
- Deputy: Robert Tapaitau (2020–2024); Albert Nicholas (2024–present)
- King's Representative: Tom Marsters
- Preceded by: Henry Puna

Deputy Prime Minister of the Cook Islands
- In office 14 June 2018 – 1 October 2020
- Prime Minister: Henry Puna
- Preceded by: Teariki Heather
- Succeeded by: Robert Tapaitau

Personal details
- Born: 28 February 1963 (age 63) Avarua, Cook Islands, New Zealand
- Party: Cook Islands Party
- Education: Massey University; University of the South Pacific
Ministerial offices
Minister of Finance and Economic Development
Incumbent
Assumed office 3 December 2010
Prime Minister	Henry Puna; Himself
Preceded by	Wilkie Rasmussen
Attorney General of the Cook Islands
Incumbent
Assumed office 1 October 2020
Prime Minister	Himself
Minister for Energy and Renewable Energy
In office 1 October 2020 – 2 June 2021
Prime Minister	Himself
Succeeded by	Robert Tapaitau
Minister for the Outer Islands
In office 1 October 2020 – 2 June 2021
Prime Minister	Himself
Succeeded by	Robert Tapaitau
Minister of Foreign Affairs and Immigration
In office 1 October 2020 – 8 February 2024
Prime Minister	Himself
Succeeded by	Tingika Elikana
Minister of Police
Incumbent
Assumed office 1 October 2020
Prime Minister	Himself
Minister of Financial Services Development Authority
In office 1 October 2020 – 2 June 2021
Prime Minister	Himself
Succeeded by	Vaine Mokoroa
Minister of the Financial Intelligence Unit
In office 3 December 2010 – 2 June 2021
Prime Minister	Henry Puna; Himself
Preceded by	Wilkie Rasmussen
Succeeded by	Vaine Mokoroa
Minister of the Cook Islands Investment Corporation
Incumbent
Assumed office 3 December 2010
Prime Minister	Henry Puna; Himself
Preceded by	Robert Wigmore
Minister of Telecommunications
In office 3 December 2010 – 2 June 2021
Prime Minister	Henry Puna; Himself
Preceded by	Jim Marurai
Succeeded by	Patrick Arioka
Minister of PERCA/Audit
In office 3 December 2010 – 2 June 2021
Prime Minister	Henry Puna; Himself
Preceded by	Wilkie Rasmussen
Succeeded by	Vaine Mokoroa
Minister of Superannuation
In office 3 December 2010 – 2 June 2021
Prime Minister	Henry Puna; Himself
Preceded by	Wilkie Rasmussen
Succeeded by	Rose Toki-Brown
Member of the Cook Islands Parliament for Takuvaine–Tutakimoa
Incumbent
Assumed office 17 November 2010
Preceded by	Ngai Tupa
Succeeded by

Mark Stephen Brown (born 28 February 1963) is a Cook Islands politician and current Prime Minister of the Cook Islands, having previously served as Deputy Prime Minister under Henry Puna. He is a member of the Cook Islands Party.

== Early life ==
Brown was born in 1963 in Avarua on Rarotonga, and educated at Nikao Maori School, Nikao Side School, Tereora College and Gisborne Boys' High School in New Zealand. He holds a Diploma in Public Sector Management from Massey University in New Zealand and a Masters in Business Administration from the University of the South Pacific. He has worked as a public servant, including as a policy advisor for the Prime Minister's Office and as head of the Ministry of Agriculture, and as a property developer. He has served as Vice-President of the Cook Islands Chamber of Commerce, and President of the Cook Islands Touch Association.

== Early political career ==
Brown unsuccessfully contested the electorate of Takuvaine–Tutakimoa in the 2006 election. He was vice-president of the Cook Islands Party in 2010 and was elected for Takuvaine–Tutakimoa in the 2010 election.

Brown was appointed to Cabinet in December 2010 as finance minister. He was re-elected at the 2014 election, and again in 2018. Following the 2018 election he was appointed Deputy Prime Minister, replacing Teariki Heather.

In December 2019 a private prosecution for fraud was lodged against Brown and Prime Minister Henry Puna, alleging that a government-chartered aircraft had been misused. In March 2021 the charges were dismissed by the High Court.

== Prime Minister, 2020– present ==
=== First term, 2020–2022 ===
In June 2020 Prime Minister Henry Puna announced his intention to stand down in September in order to compete for the role of Secretary-General of the Pacific Islands Forum. He nominated Brown as his replacement. On 1 October, following the retirement of Henry Puna, he was elected Prime Minister. He retained almost all of his and Puna's portfolios in his initial Cabinet, surrendering only Education and Tourism to other Ministers. He plans to re-allocate major portfolios such as Finance and Foreign Affairs to other Ministers in 2021.

In mid-December 2020, Prime Minister Brown and his New Zealand counterpart Jacinda Ardern announced that a travel bubble between New Zealand and the Cook Islands would be established next year, facilitating two-way quarantine-free travel between the two countries.

A cabinet reshuffle on 2 June 2021 saw him distribute half his portfolios to other Ministers.

=== Second term, 2022–2026 ===
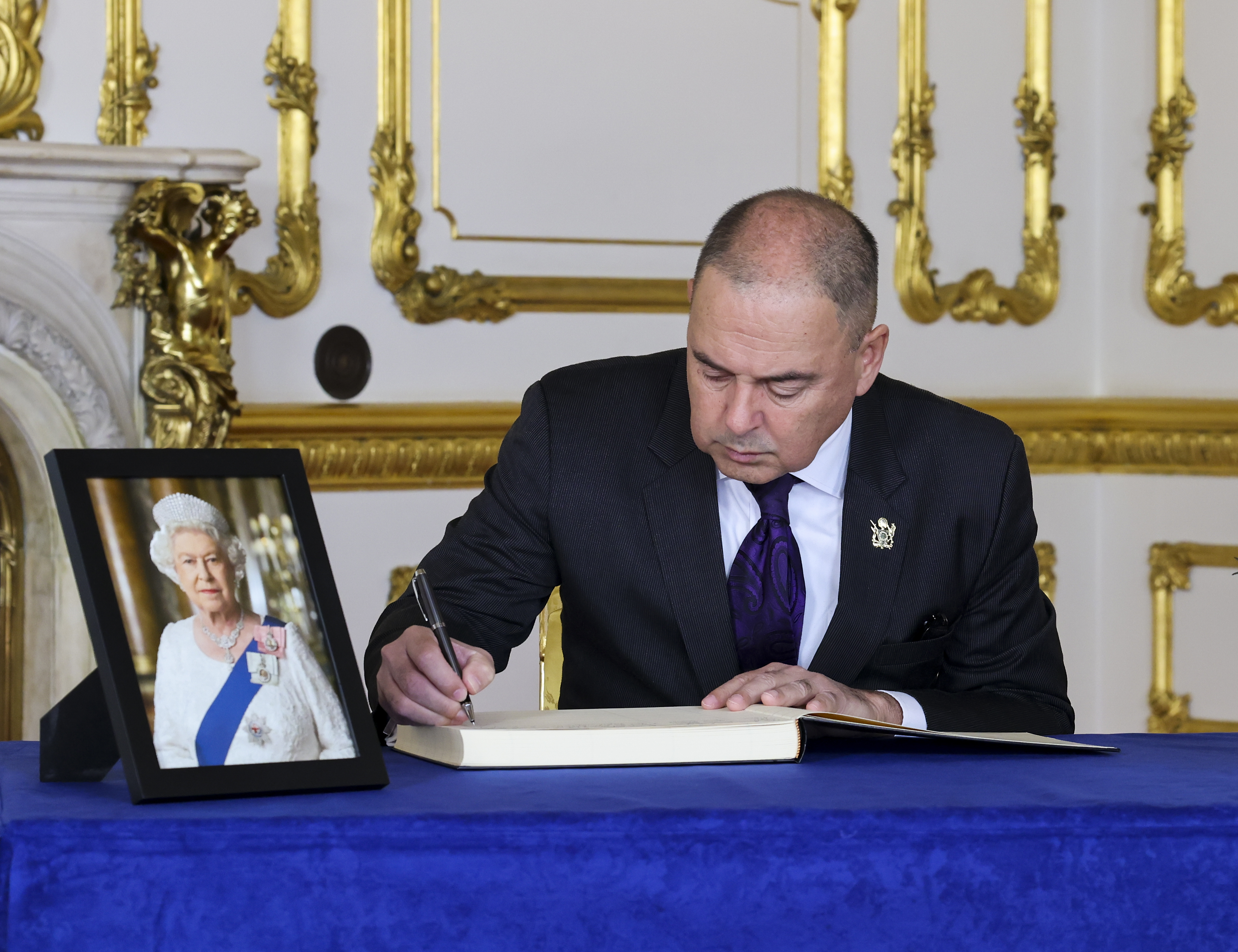
Brown signing the book of condolence for Queen Elizabeth II at Lancaster House on 17 September 2022

He was re-elected at the 2022 election and reappointed Prime Minister after securing the support of two independents.

In early February 2024, Brown advocated a trilateral defence and security co-operation arrangement between the Cook Islands, New Zealand, and Australia. This proposed agreement would supplement the Cook Islands' existing defence and security arrangements with New Zealand.

==== Cook Islands passport proposal ====
In mid October 2024, Brown advocated the introduction of a separate Cook Islands passport during the 53rd session of the House of Ariki Annual General Meeting but declined to explain whether this would affect the New Zealand citizenship status of Cook Islanders. In response, New Zealand Foreign Minister Winston Peters questioned whether the people of the Cook Islands supported Brown and other politicians' proposal for a separate Cook Islands passport, warning of its implications for the territory's status as an associated state. Brown responded that the Cook Islands passport proposal would not affect the territory's constitutional relationship with New Zealand. Tuaine Unuia, the Clerk of the House of Ariki, said that the House supported Brown's proposal.

On 23 December, the office of Foreign Minister Peters clarified that the Cook Islands would not be able to have its own passport, citizenship and United Nations membership without becoming an independent country. Any changes to the territory's constitutional relationship with New Zealand would have to be decided by the Cook Islanders via a referendum. According to BBC News, several Cook Islanders residing in New Zealand questioned whether Brown and the Cook Islands government had consulted the public over the proposal and expressed concern that any possible change to the Cook Island's sovereignty would affect their access to healthcare and other services in New Zealand. On 6 February 2025, Brown formally abandoned the Cook Islands passport proposal in the face of strident opposition from the New Zealand government, stating "We don't want to jeopardise our people and the safety and security of Cook Islanders. We will now put this onto the back burner."

=== 2025 Partnership agreement with China ===
In early February 2025, Brown confirmed that he would undertake a five day visit to China between 10 and 14 February to sign a "Joint Action Plan for Comprehensive Strategic Partnership" with the Chinese government. The partnership agreement was criticised by New Zealand Foreign Minister Winston Peters, who said that Brown and the Cook Islands government had not consulted New Zealand on the matter. Due to the free association relationship between New Zealand and Cook Islands, New Zealand has oversight over the island state's foreign affairs and defence. In response to criticism, Brown said that the partnership agreement did not involve security and defence issues, stating "there is no need for New Zealand to sit in the room with us while we are going through our comprehensive agreement with China. We have advised them on the matter, but as far as being consulted and to the level of detail that they were requiring, I think that's not a requirement."

The Chinese Embassy in Wellington and Chinese Foreign Ministry spokesperson Guo Jiakun issued statements defending bilateral relations between China and the Cook Islands, and warning third parties not to interfere with that relationship. On 12 February, Cook Islands Foreign Minister Tingika Elikana reiterated the Cook Islands Cabinet's support for Brown's leadership and the partnership agreement with China.

On 14 February, Brown and the Cook Islands delegation ratified a strategic partnership agreement with China. Following the agreement, Brown said that the Cook Islands' partnership agreement with China "complements, not replaces" its relationship with New Zealand. In response, Peters' office stated that the New Zealand government would be considering the agreement carefully in light of its interests and constitutional relationship with the Cook Islands. The partnership agreement was criticised by former New Zealand Prime Minister Helen Clark, who said that Brown "seems to have signed behind the backs of his own people as well as of New Zealand."

On 17 February, 400 protesters led by Cook Islands United Party leader Teariki Heather protested against Brown's passport proposal and Chinese partnership agreement during the opening of the Cook Islands Parliament. On 26 February, Heather lodged a motion of no confidence against Brown in the Cook Islands Parliament. The motion failed by a margin of 13 to 9 votes. In response Brown criticised New Zealand for allegedly spreading disinformation, stating:

This is not about consultation. This is about control. We cannot compete with New Zealand. When their one-sided messaging is so compelling that even our opposition members will be swayed. We never once talked to the New Zealand government about cutting our ties with New Zealand but the message our people received was that we were cutting our ties with New Zealand. We have been discussing the comprehensive partnership with New Zealand for months. But the messaging that got out is that we have not consulted. We are a partner in the relationship with New Zealand. We are not a child."

=== 2025-26 tensions with New Zealand ===
Following the China partnership agreement dispute, Peters suggested that Cook Islands-New Zealand relations needed to be reset, and that a new agreement stating the "overall parameters and constraints of the free association model" needed to be signed. In response, Brown told ABC News on 3 April 2025 that the new agreement should reflect the fact that the Cook Islands had become more independent over the decades and should not "wind back the clock of colonialism." He said:

If there's anything, I would see a review of our arrangement which recognises the fact that the Cook Islands — not only is it one of the first countries to achieve high income status in the region, but it's one that is well-respected within the region for being able to have its own voice (and) a country that does make its own choices."

In response, a spokesperson for Peters said that Brown needed to make the case for Cook Islands independence to his people before proceeding with plans to seek further independence from New Zealand.

In response to media reports that the New Zealand Government had suspended almost NZ$20 million worth of core sector aid funding to the Cook Islands in response to disagreements over the Cook Island's partnership agreement with China, Brown stated on 19 June 2025 that the Cook Islands was "not privy to or consulted on" any agreements that New Zealand might sign with China during NZ Prime Minister Christopher Luxon's visit to Beijing that week.

On 9 November 2025, the New Zealand government extended its suspension of NZ$29.8 million worth of education and health funding to the Cook Islands over the next two financial years, citing a breakdown in trust caused by the Cook Islands' partnership agreements with China. On 14 November, Brown told Cook Islands media that he had requested a meeting with New Zealand Prime Minister Luxon and Foreign Minister Peters but that they had rejected his request, preferring to conduct discussions via officials. Brown also minimised the economic impact of the aid cuts, saying that the Cook Islands was able to cover the deficit due to its "strong economy, driven by tourism." Referring to the ongoing "cost of living" crisis in New Zealand, he said:

Looking to New Zealand, they are having issues with the state of their economy, it's going backwards, the people are running away from New Zealand for Australia to find better opportunities. But our status however, it's all good, hence we were able to afford to cover the amount of money that we did not receive from New Zealand."

Brown also reiterated the Cook Island's commitment to maintaining its free association relationship with New Zealand. In response, a spokesperson for Peters described Brown's vision of the New Zealand-Cook Islands relationship as "inconsistent" with the free association model.

In mid-March 2026, Brown visited New Zealand. He spoke at a formal event at the Takina Events Centre in Wellington before travelling to Auckland to meet with Cook Islander New Zealanders. With the 60th anniversary of the Cook Islands-New Zealand free association approaching, Brown said that the bilateral relationship needed a "rethink." While Brown did not meet with Luxon during his visit, he and his officials met with Foreign Minister Peters and New Zealand officials at Peters' Auckland home. While the two parties did not reach an agreement on repairing bilateral relations which had been strained by the Cook Islands' partnership agreement with China, they took photos together and issued a joint statement that they would continue political dialogue over the next few weeks on addressing bilateral differences. On 23 March, Brown addressed the Cook Islands diaspora, saying they helped "expand the borders" of the islands territory. He also announced new measures to support the diaspora including a government internship programme in Rarotonga, expanded access to an online births, marriages and deaths registry, and a plan to rollout Cook Islands stamp processing from mid-2027.

On 2 April 2026, Brown and Peters signed a defence and security declaration. Peter also confirmed that New Zealand would resume about NZ$29.8 million in annual aid funding to the islands territory; mending bilateral relations, which has been strained in 2025 by the Cook Islands' partnership agreements with China. The defence and security declaration ensures that New Zealand would be privy to similar deals with third countries in the future.

=== Third term, 2026–present ===
Brown won re-election at the 2026 general election. The Cook Islands Party secured an historic fifth consecutive term in government, having won a majority of 13 of the 24 seats in parliament. The party also has existing partnership agreements with the two independent candidates elected for Atiu and the candidate for Mauke. The three independent candidates elected for Mangaia have since agreed to join the Cook Islands Party. This would give the Cook Islands Party-led government caucus a supermajority of 19 seats in parliament. Brown confirmed that he would retain all previous Cabinet ministers that had won their seats in their positions.

== See also ==
- List of international prime ministerial trips made by Mark Brown (Cook Islands)
