= Elections in the Cook Islands =

The Cook Islands elects a legislature on a national level. The Parliament of the Cook Islands has 24 members, elected for a four-year term in single-seat constituencies.

The most recent general election was held on 12 August 2026. The Cook Islands Party gained a seat to win an overall majority, with 13 of 24 seats, with Prime Minister Mark Brown continuing in office.

There are also local elections held every four years in which mayors and councillors of the country's island governments are elected. The country's main population centre, the island of Rarotonga, has no local government so no local elections are held.

== Latest election ==
Based on preliminary results, the Cook Islands Party looked to have won 12 out of the 24 seats of the parliament, the Cook Islands United Party won four, and the Democratic Party did not win any seats. Cook Islands Party leader and incumbent prime minister Mark Brown won his Takuvaine-Tutakimoa seat and United Party leader Teariki Heather won his Murienua seat, but Democratic Party and opposition leader Tina Browne looked to have lost her Rakahanga seat to Cook Islands Party candidate Levi Hitarahera Teinaki.

With the declaration of the final result on 26 August, Cook Islands Party candidate Tingika Elikana was found to have overcome a narrow deficit shown in the preliminary results to retain his seat, giving his party an outright majority of 13 seats in the parliament. Independent candidates won seven seats, the Cook Islands United Party won four, and the Democratic Party was confirmed to have lost all of its seats.

Graph of the party split among 24 seats.
Party	Votes	%	+/–	Seats	+/–
Cook Islands Party	4,175	45.32	+1.25	13	+1
Cook Islands United Party	2,866	31.11	+12.30	4	+1
Democratic Party	1,116	12.11	–14.82	0	–5
Progressive Party of the Cook Islands	53	0.58	+0.38	0	0
Independents (Note: Includes the Atiu candidates who ran under the Independent-Enuamanu label and the Mauke candidate who ran under the Independence Party label.)	1,003	10.89	+3.58	7	+4
Total	9,213	100.00	–	24	0

=== By electorate ===
Constituency		Candidate	Party	Votes	%
Rarotonga	Akaoa	Robert Stanley Heather^{†}	Cook Islands United	324	82.7
Rarotonga	Akaoa	Teakaau Tex Tangimetua	Cook Islands	68	17.3
Rarotonga	Avatiu–Ruatonga–Palmerston	Albert Nicholas^{†}	Cook Islands	376	62.5
Rarotonga	Avatiu–Ruatonga–Palmerston	Teina Rongo	Cook Islands United	226	37.5
Rarotonga	Matavera	Taneao Ngamata	Cook Islands United	240	37.7
Rarotonga	Matavera	Vaitoti Tupa^{†}	Democratic	231	36.3
Rarotonga	Matavera	Aneru Andrew Tautu	Cook Islands	166	26.1
Rarotonga	Murienua	Teariki Heather^{†}	Cook Islands United	344	64.9
Rarotonga	Murienua	Nooroa Baker	Cook Islands	169	31.9
Rarotonga	Murienua	Samuel Mataroa	Democratic	17	3.2
Rarotonga	Ngatangiia	Tukaka Ama^{†}	Cook Islands	272	45.6
Rarotonga	Ngatangiia	Mapi Ioteva	Cook Islands United	241	40.4
Rarotonga	Ngatangiia	Itinga Maoate	Democratic	65	10.9
Rarotonga	Ngatangiia	Christopher Robert Denny	Progressive	18	3.0
Rarotonga	Nikao–Panama	Vaine Mokoroa^{†}	Cook Islands	497	59.0
Rarotonga	Nikao–Panama	Ngamau Mere Munokoa	Cook Islands United	311	36.9
Rarotonga	Nikao–Panama	Te Tuhi Tauratumaru Kelly	Progressive	35	4.2
Rarotonga	Ruaau	Tim Tunui Varu^{†}	Cook Islands United	370	51.7
Rarotonga	Ruaau	Arama Wichman	Cook Islands	301	42.1
Rarotonga	Ruaau	William (Smiley) Heather	Democratic	44	6.2
Rarotonga	Takuvaine–Tutakimoa	Mark Brown^{†}	Cook Islands	312	60.2
Rarotonga	Takuvaine–Tutakimoa	Davina Hosking-Ashford	Democratic	115	22.2
Rarotonga	Takuvaine–Tutakimoa	Venetia Mere Jacqueline Tuara	Cook Islands United	91	17.6
Rarotonga	Titikaveka	Sonny Williams^{†}	Cook Islands	363	45.9
Rarotonga	Titikaveka	Elizabeth Iro	Cook Islands United	238	30.1
Rarotonga	Titikaveka	Sholan Ivaiti	Democratic	189	23.9
Rarotonga	Tupapa–Maraerenga	Tamaiti Maru Willie	Cook Islands	617	64.2
Rarotonga	Tupapa–Maraerenga	Rota Tama Williams	Cook Islands United	227	23.6
Rarotonga	Tupapa–Maraerenga	Edward Victor Drollett	Democratic	117	12.2
Aitutaki	Amuri–Ureia	Toanui Isamaela^{†}	Cook Islands	165	41.9
Aitutaki	Amuri–Ureia	Terepai Maoate	Democratic	106	26.9
Aitutaki	Amuri–Ureia	Nicholas Royle Henry	Independent	98	24.9
Aitutaki	Amuri–Ureia	Tumutoa Teariki Nicholls	Cook Islands United	25	6.3
Aitutaki	Arutanga–Reureu–Nikaupara	Tereapii Maki-Kavana^{†}	Cook Islands	179	46.7
Aitutaki	Arutanga–Reureu–Nikaupara	Maitoe Henry	Cook Islands United	113	29.5
Aitutaki	Arutanga–Reureu–Nikaupara	Tekura Moeroa Bishop	Independent	91	23.8
Aitutaki	Vaipae–Tautu	Teokotai Herman^{†}	Cook Islands	241	52.3
Aitutaki	Vaipae–Tautu	Teariki Reva George	Democratic	139	30.2
Aitutaki	Vaipae–Tautu	Teariki Kureta Tangua	Cook Islands United	81	17.6
Mangaia	Ivirua	Agnes Armstrong^{†}	Independent	Uncontested	
Mangaia	Oneroa	Rimmel Poila-Mokoroa	Independent	77	37.2
Mangaia	Oneroa	Teina Tearii	Cook Islands	66	31.9
Mangaia	Oneroa	Wesley Kareroa^{†}	Democratic	64	30.9
Mangaia	Tamarua	Tetangi Matapo^{†}	Independent	34	59.6
Mangaia	Tamarua	Ngatamaroa Ngatokorua	Cook Islands	23	40.4
Atiu	Teenui–Mapumai	Rose Toki-Brown^{†}	Independent-Enuamanu	81	77.9
Atiu	Teenui–Mapumai	Charles Amaru Koronui	Independent	23	22.1
Atiu	Tengatangi–Areora–Ngatiarua	Te-Hani Brown^{†}	Independent-Enuamanu	95	66.9
Atiu	Tengatangi–Areora–Ngatiarua	Puai Tane Wichman	Independent	47	33.1
Outer Islands	Manihiki	George Maggie Angene^{†} (Note: Previously the MP for Tupapa-Maraerenga)	Independent	56	45.9
Outer Islands	Manihiki	Akaiti Puna^{†}	Cook Islands	51	41.8
Outer Islands	Manihiki	Puapii William	Independent	15	12.3
Outer Islands	Mauke	Stephen Matapo^{†}	Independence Party	175	89.3
Outer Islands	Mauke	James Vini Beer	Independent	21	10.7
Outer Islands	Mitiaro	Tuakeu Tangatapoto^{†}	Cook Islands	60	61.9
Outer Islands	Mitiaro	Makara Murare	Cook Islands United	35	36.1
Outer Islands	Mitiaro	Paul Raui Pokoati Allsworth	Democratic	2	2.1
Outer Islands	Penrhyn	Vaine Wichman	Cook Islands	71	58.7
Outer Islands	Penrhyn	Sarakura Tapaitau^{†}	Independent	50	41.3
Outer Islands	Pukapuka–Nassau	Tingika Elikana^{†}	Cook Islands	146	51.0
Outer Islands	Pukapuka–Nassau	Kirianu Nio	Independent	140	49.0
Outer Islands	Rakahanga	Levi Hitarahera Teinaki	Cook Islands	32	54.2
Outer Islands	Rakahanga	Tina Pupuke-Browne^{†}	Democratic	27	45.8
^{†} – indicates an incumbent candidate

== By-elections ==
Election	Date	Reason	Winner
1963 European by-election			Dick Rapley
1963 Mauke by-election			Julian Dashwood
1963 Rarotonga by-election		Teupoko'ina Morgan moved to New Zealand	David Marama Hosking
1965 Te-Ao-O-Tonga by-election	9 July 1965	Resignation of Marguerite Story	Albert Henry (CIP)
1966 Mauke by-election		Resignation of Julian Dashwood	Tupui Henry (CIP)
1977 Takitumu by-election	22 December 1977	Death of Tiakana Numanga	Iaveta Short (DP)
1978 Mitiaro by-election	5 October 1978	Annulment of the general election result	Tiki Tetava
1991 Murienua by-election			Tom Marsters (CIP)
1994 Ivirua by-election	December 1994		Jim Marurai (DAP)
1996 Nikao–Panama by-election	July 1996		Ngamau Munokoa (DP)
1999 Pukapuka-Nassau by-election	29 September 1999	Invalidation of election results	None
2000 Pukapuka-Nassau by-election	28 September 2000	Invalidation of 1999 Pukapuka-Nassau by-election.	Tiaki Wuatai (NAP)
2002 Penrhyn by-election	27 June 2002	Disqualification of Tepure Tapaitau	Wilkie Rasmussen (CIP)
2003 Rua’au by-election	14 August 2003	Death of Maria Heather	Geoffrey Heather (DP)
2003 Arutanga by-election	20 November 2003	Resignation of Teina Bishop	Teina Bishop (Independent)
2005 Manihiki by-election	8 February 2005	Resignation of Robert Woonton	Henry Puna (CIP)
2006 Teenui-Mapumai by-election	8 June 2006	Retirement of Upoko Simpson	Norman George (Independent)
2006 Matavera by-election	19 July 2006	Conviction of Vaevae Pare for fraud	Kiriau Turepu (CIP)
2006 Akaoa by-election	29 November 2006	Previous election produced tied result	Teariki Heather (CIP)
2007 Titikaveka by-election	7 February 2007	Election of Robert Wigmore declared invalid	Robert Wigmore (DP)
2009 Tamarua by-election	3 February 2009	Death of Mii Parima	Pukeiti Pukeiti (CIP)
2011 Pukapuka by-election	7 June 2011	Election of Tekii Lazaro declared invalid	Tekii Lazaro (CIP)
2012 Titikaveka by-election	21 June 2012	Death of Robert Wigmore	Selina Napa (DP)
2013 Tamarua by-election	29 January 2013	Death of Pukeiti Pukeiti	Tetangi Matapo (DP)
2013 Murienua by-election	19 September 2013	Resignation of Tom Marsters	Kaota Tuariki (CIP)
2014 Murienua by-election	19 February 2014	Resignation of Kaota Tuariki	James Beer (DP)
2014 Mitiaro by-election	11 November 2014	Draw in the 2014 general election	Results not counted due to court order.
2015 Vaipae-Tautu by-election	31 March 2015	2014 election result voided	Moana Ioane (CIP)
2016 Arutanga-Reureu-Nikaupara by-election	13 October 2016	Teina Bishop convicted of corruption	Pumati Israela (OCI)
2017 Avatiu–Ruatonga–Palmerston by-election	17 May 2017	Resignation of Albert Nicholas	Albert Nicholas (CIP)
2017 Ivirua by-election	17 August 2017	Resignation of Jim Marurai	Tony Armstrong
2019 Ivirua by-election	21 January 2019	Death of Tony Armstrong	Agnes Armstrong
March 2019 Tengatangi-Areora-Ngatiarua by-election	18 March 2019	Defection of Te-Hani Brown from the Democratic Party	Te-Hani Brown
November 2019 Tengatangi-Areora-Ngatiarua by-election	14 November 2019	Resignation of Te-Hani Brown	Te-Hani Brown
2021 Manihiki by-election	5 May 2021	Resignation of Henry Puna	Akaiti Puna (CIP)
2024 Penrhyn by-election	12 March 2024	Conviction of Robert Tapaitau for fraud	Sarakura Tapaitau

== See also ==
- Electoral calendar
- Electoral system
