= 1974 Cook Islands general election =

- 3 December 1974
- 22 seats in the Legislative Assembly; 13 seats needed for a majority
Party	Leader	Seats	+/–
Cook Islands	Albert Henry	14	−1
Democratic	Thomas Davis	8	+1
This lists parties that won seats. See the complete results below.
Premier before	Premier after
Albert Henry; Cook Islands	Albert Henry; Cook Islands

Early general elections were held in the Cook Islands on 3 December 1974. The result was a victory for the ruling Cook Islands Party (CIP), which won 14 of the 22 seats in the Legislative Assembly with 64% of the vote. The Democratic Party won the remaining eight seats. CIP leader Albert Henry remained Premier.

== Background ==
The early elections were called by Henry following a visit to New Zealand for the funeral of Prime Minister Norman Kirk, stating that he also wanted to hold a vote on self-government or integration into New Zealand. A planned referendum would have seen voters given the options of independence, self-government or integration. However, the referendum plans were later dropped.

== Campaign ==
Henry's government refused to allow the three thousand Cook Islanders living in New Zealand to vote by post, most of whom were expected to vote for the Democratic Party. Henry also obstructed attempts to charter an Air New Zealand plane for voters to fly home. However, the Democratic Party was able to charter an Air Nauru Boeing 727 to fly in some voters. Voters paid their own fares, and the flights were open to all regardless of party affiliation. The tactic was copied by the government at the next election, though with public money.

Democratic Party attempts to distribute leaflets to outer islands were also stopped by Henry.

== Results ==
Party	Seats	+/–
Cook Islands Party	14	–1
Democratic Party	8	+1
Total	22	0
Source: Pacific Islands Monthly

=== By electorate ===
Constituency	Candidate	Party	Votes
Aitutaki–Manuae	Geoffrey Henry	Cook Islands	644
Aitutaki–Manuae	William Estall	Cook Islands	628
Aitutaki–Manuae	Joseph Williams	Cook Islands	628
Aitutaki–Manuae	Moeua Raela		188
Aitutaki–Manuae	Timote Turu		164
Aitutaki–Manuae	Tutai Mataiti		158
Atiu	Vainerere Tangatapoto	Democratic	267
Atiu	Paul Tangata	Democratic	259
Atiu	Teariki Franco Mateariki		198
Atiu	Mataki Kaiaruna		195
Mangaia	Pokino Aberahama	Democratic	427
Mangaia	Ngatupuna Matepi	Democratic	414
Mangaia	Ngamokopuna Tomokino		143
Mangaia	Pukeiti Uritua		130
Manihiki	George Frederick Ellis Jr.	Cook Islands	108
Manihiki	Tihau Napara		76
Mauke	Tupui Ariki Henry	Cook Islands	196
Mauke	Tupuna Ngaoire		54
Mitiaro	Raui Pokoati	Cook Islands	98
Mitiaro	Ta Ngatoko		16
Penrhyn	Tangaroa Tangaroa	Democratic	186
Penrhyn	Ben Samuel		38
Penrhyn	Fred Ford		26
Puaikura	William Heather	Democratic	410
Puaikura	Tamataia Pera	Cook Islands	409
Puaikura	Harry Napa		401
Puaikura	Taru Moana		388
Pukapuka–Nassau	Inatio Akaruru	Cook Islands	307
Pukapuka–Nassau	Mataora Tutai		56
Rakahanga	Pupuke Robati	Democratic	84
Rakahanga	Turuta Temu		50
Takitumu	Apenera Short	Cook Islands	484
Takitumu	Tiakana Numanga	Cook Islands	475
Takitumu	Taramai Tetonga	Cook Islands	465
Takitumu	William Cowan		395
Takitumu	William Robert Hosking		395
Takitumu	Moerai Kekena		391
Te-au-o-Tonga	Albert Henry	Cook Islands	1,107
Te-au-o-Tonga	Thomas Davis	Democratic	1,080
Te-au-o-Tonga	Eric Man Browne	Cook Islands	1,055
Te-au-o-Tonga	Teanua Kamana	Cook Islands	1,041
Te-au-o-Tonga	Tamarua Joseph Browne		1,031
Te-au-o-Tonga	Mana Strickland		1,026
Te-au-o-Tonga	Mani Browne		1,015
Te-au-o-Tonga	Tuoro Rangi Anguna		1,000

== Aftermath ==
After the CIP lost their two-thirds majority and ability to amend the constitution, Henry threatened to take action against Democratic Party supporters working in the islands' civil service.

When the newly elected Assembly convened, Marguerite Story was re-elected as Speaker.

=== 1977 Takitumu by-election ===
An election was held on 22 December 1977 to fill the vacancy after the death of Tiakana Numanga.

Candidate	Party	Votes	%
Iaveta Short	Democratic Party	485	51.49
Matapo Matapo	Cook Islands Party	457	48.51
Total		942	100.00
Source: The Cook Islands Gazette
