= Ngatupuna Matepi =

Cook Islands politician (1909–1977)

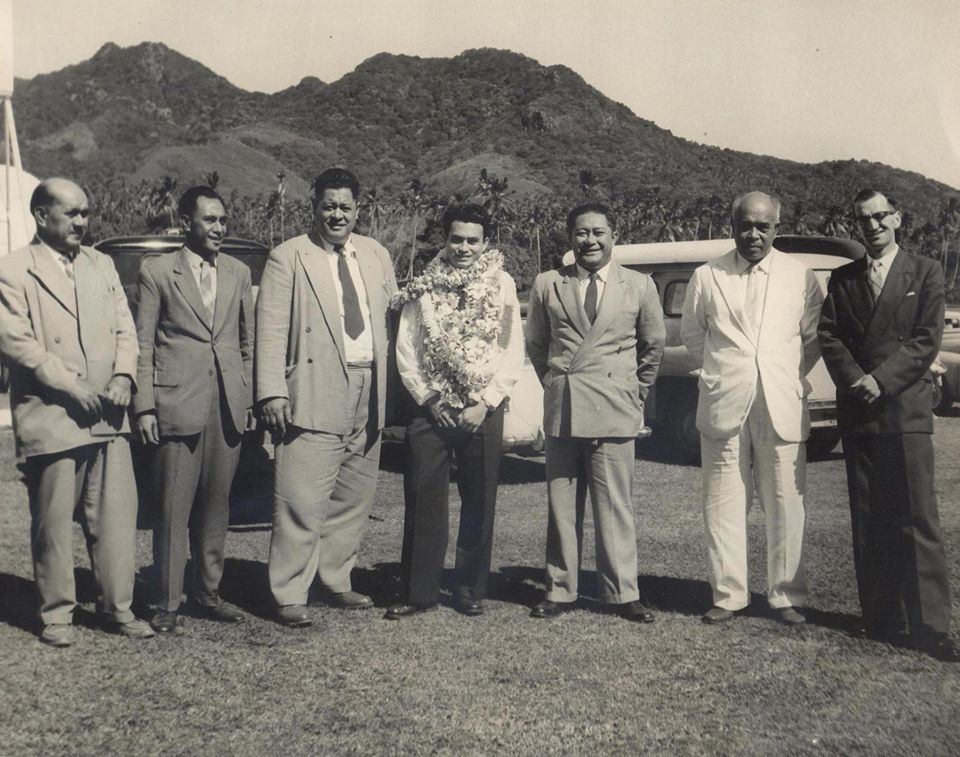

Member of the Legislative Assembly
- In office 1958–1977
- Constituency: Mangaia

Leader of the Opposition
- In office 1968–1969
- Succeeded by: Tangaroa Tangaroa

Member for Health and Social Development
- In office 1964–1965
- Preceded by: Julian Dashwood
- Succeeded by: Manea Tamarua; Julian Dashwood

Personal details
- Born: 1909 Rarotonga, Cook Islands
- Died: 1977 (aged 68) Rarotonga, Cook Islands
- Party: UPP (1965–1968); UCI (1968–1971); Democratic (1971–1977)

Ngatupuna Matepi (1909–1977) was a Cook Islands politician. He served as a member of the Legislative Assembly from 1958 until his death, had two spells in the cabinet between 1962 and 1965, and became the first official Leader of the Opposition in 1968.

== Biography ==
Matepi was born in Rarotonga in 1909. After finishing his education in New Zealand, he worked as a schoolteacher in Mangaia for 33 years. He then established several businesses, including a bakery, cinema and store.

Having previously served as a member of the Legislative Council, in the 1958 elections to the new Legislative Assembly Matepi successfully contested the Mangaia seat. In the 1961 elections he was indirectly elected to the Assembly by Mangaia Island Council. In 1962 he was appointed to the new Executive Committee. The following year he was a candidate to become the first Leader of Government Business in 1963, but lost a vote to Dick Charles Brown by 11 votes to 10. Shortly afterwards he was also defeated in a vote to become the Speaker, losing to Teariki Tuavera.

After Julian Dashwood was sacked from the cabinet in 1964, Brown appointed Matepi as his replacement, giving him the portfolios of Health and Social Development. He was directly elected again in 1965 as a representative of the United Political Party but lost his place in the cabinet as the Cook Islands Party won the elections. He was re-elected in 1968 as a United Cook Islanders candidate, after which he became Leader of the Opposition, serving for a year before handing over to Tangaroa Tangaroa as part of an agreement to rotate the post between the party's MLAs. He joined the Democratic Party after it was formed in 1971 and was re-elected again in 1972 and 1974.

In 1977, Matepi was awarded the Queen Elizabeth II Silver Jubilee Medal. He died in Rarotonga in 1977 at the age of 68.
