= Terepai Maoate =

6th Prime Minister of the Cook Islands

Sir Terepai Maoate KBE
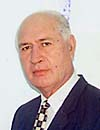

6th Deputy Prime Minister of the Cook Islands
- In office 9 August 2005 – 23 December 2009
- Prime Minister: Jim Marurai
- Queen's Representative: Frederick Tutu Goodwin
- Preceded by: Geoffrey Henry
- Succeeded by: Robert Wigmore
- In office 30 January 2003 – 5 November 2003
- Prime Minister: Robert Woonton
- Representative: Frederick Tutu Goodwin
- Preceded by: Geoffrey Henry
- Succeeded by: Ngamau Munokoa
- In office 1985 – 1 February 1989
- Prime Minister: Tom Davis; Pupuke Robati
- Queen's Representative: Tangaroa Tangaroa
- Preceded by: Geoffrey Henry
- Succeeded by: Inatio Akaruru

8th Prime Minister of the Cook Islands
- In office 18 November 1999 – 11 February 2002
- Monarch: Elizabeth II
- Deputy: Norman George; Robert Woonton
- Queen's Representative: Apenera Short; Laurence Greig (Acting); Frederick Tutu Goodwin
- Preceded by: Joe Williams
- Succeeded by: Robert Woonton
- Constituency: Ngatangiia

Personal details
- Born: 1 September 1934 Rarotonga, Cook Islands
- Died: 9 July 2012 (aged 77)
- Party: Democratic Party
- Spouse: Lady Marito (née Mapu)
- Children: Terepai Maoate Jnr

Sir Terepai Tuamure Maoate KBE (1 September 1934 – 9 July 2012) was Prime Minister of the Cook Islands from 18 November 1999 to 11 February 2002. He was a member of the Cook Islands Democratic Party.

Maoate was born in Rarotonga on 1 September 1934, and educated at Ngatangiia Primary School, Fiji School of Medicine, and the University of Auckland (New Zealand). He worked as a medical doctor before becoming Director of Clinical Services for the Ministry of Health in 1976.

Maoate was elected to the Cook Islands Parliament as MP for Ngatangiia in the March 1983 general election. He subsequently served as Minister of Health and Agriculture in the Democratic cabinet of Tom Davis, and between 1985 and 1989 was also Deputy Prime Minister.

In 1998, Maoate became Leader of the Democratic party and Leader of the Opposition. The 1999 election produced a hung Parliament, and following several coalition realignments, Maoate became prime minister. He was ousted by his former Deputy Prime Minister Robert Woonton on 11 February 2002, and subsequently became Leader of the Opposition.

In early 2003 the Democratic Party re-merged, and Maoate was reappointed to cabinet, replacing Cook Islands Party leader Geoffrey Henry as Deputy Prime Minister. However the arrangement did not last, with Maoate resigning and tabling a motion of no-confidence in the government in November. Continued factional infighting saw Maoate fail to become prime minister after the 2004 elections, when a group of Democratic Party MPs split to back Jim Marurai. However, a coalition realignment in 2005 saw Maoate reappointed as Deputy Prime Minister again. In July 2009, he was given the additional position of Foreign Minister.

In December 2009 Maoate was sacked as Deputy Prime Minister in favour of Robert Wigmore, sparking a mass-resignation of Democratic Party cabinet members and the withdrawal of support for the government. He was subsequently replaced as Democratic Party leader by Wigmore in June 2010.

In September 2010 he failed to be reselected for his Ngatangiia seat after losing a run-off. He subsequently decided to run as an independent, but was unsuccessful.

Maoate was knighted in 2007.

Maoate died on 9 July 2012 aged 77.
