= 1972 Cook Islands general election =

- 11 April 1972
- 22 seats in the Legislative Assembly; 13 seats needed for a majority
Party	Leader	Seats	+/–
Cook Islands	Albert Henry	15	−1
Democratic	Thomas Davis	7	New
This lists parties that won seats. See the complete results below.
Premier before	Premier after
Albert Henry; Cook Islands	Albert Henry; Cook Islands

General elections were held in the Cook Islands on 11 April 1972. The result was a victory for the ruling Cook Islands Party (CIP), which won 15 of the 22 seats in the Legislative Assembly. The newly formed Democratic Party won seven seats. CIP leader Albert Henry remained Premier.

== Background ==
The Assembly elected in May 1968 had a three-year term, with the next elections expected in 1971. However, in March 1969 a bill was approved to extend the parliamentary term to four years.

== Campaign ==
Prior to the elections the United Cook Islanders party was disbanded, with its members joining the new Democratic Party founded by Thomas Davis after he returned to the Cook Islands from the United States. All candidates except a single independent (Edwin Gold in Mangaia) were from the CIP or Democratic Party.

Incumbent MPs standing down included Director for Health and Aitutaki MP Joseph Williams and Teau-o-Tonga MP Teaukara.

== Results ==
Party	Seats	+/–
Cook Islands Party	15	–1
Democratic Party	7	New
Independents	0	0
Total	22	0
Source: Pacific Islands Monthly

=== Elected members ===
Constituency	Member	Party	Notes
Aitutaki	Dan Daniel	Cook Islands Party	
Aitutaki	William Estall	Cook Islands Party	Re-elected
Aitutaki	Geoffrey Henry	Cook Islands Party	
Atiu	Vainerere Tangatapoto	Democratic Party	Re-elected
Atiu	Pomani Tangata	Democratic Party	
Mangaia	Pokino Aberahama	Democratic Party	Re-elected (previously United Cook Islanders)
Mangaia	Ngatupuna Matepi	Democratic Party	Re-elected (previously United Cook Islanders)
Manihiki	Taraeka Kaisara	Cook Islands Party	
Mauke	Tupui Henry	Cook Islands Party	Re-elected unopposed
Mitiaro	Raui Pokoati	Cook Islands Party	Re-elected unopposed
Penrhyn	Tangaroa Tangaroa	Democratic Party	Re-elected (previously United Cook Islanders)
Puaikura	Tamataia Pera	Cook Islands Party	Re-elected
Puaikura	Taru Moana	Cook Islands Party	Re-elected
Pukapuka–Nassau	Inatio Akaruru	Cook Islands Party	Re-elected
Rakahanga	Pupuke Robati	Democratic Party	Re-elected (previously United Cook Islanders)
Takitumu	Tiakana Numanga	Cook Islands Party	Re-elected
Takitumu	Apenera Short	Cook Islands Party	Re-elected
Takitumu	Taramai Tetonga	Cook Islands Party	Re-elected
Te-au-o-Tonga	Joe Browne	Cook Islands Party	
Te-au-o-Tonga	Albert Henry	Cook Islands Party	Re-elected
Te-au-o-Tonga	Teanua Kamana	Cook Islands Party	Re-elected
Te-au-o-Tonga	Thomas Davis	Democratic Party	
Source: Pacific Islands Monthly

== Aftermath ==
Following the elections, Henry formed a new cabinet, in which he held fifteen portfolios. The other ministers were Inatio Akaruru (Minister of Health), William Estall (Minister of Agriculture, Marketing Board Co-operatives and Shipping), Geoffrey Henry (Minister of Education, Justice, Lands and Survey), Tupua Henry (Minister of Housing, Internal Affairs and Public Works), Tiakana Numanga (Minister of Fisheries and Police) and Apenera Short (Minister of Broadcasting, Electric Power Supply, Government Printer and Newspaper Corporation).
