= 1958 Cook Islands general election =

General elections were held in the Cook Islands on 13 October 1958, the first under universal suffrage.

== Background ==
Following the recommendations of the 1955 Belshaw-Stace Report, the 23-member Legislative Council was replaced by a 27-member Legislative Assembly.

Of the 27 members, 15 were directly elected; 14 from ten general constituencies and one from a European voter constituency. Seven members were indirectly elected by Island Councils (four from Rarotonga and one from Aitutaki, Atiu and Mangaia). The remaining five members were officials, including the Resident Commissioner as President of the Assembly, the Administration Secretary, the Treasurer and two members appointed by the Resident Commissioner.

== Campaign ==
A total of 65 candidates contested the directly elected seats, including former Legislative Council member Willie Watson, who ran under the name Viri Vokotini in one of the general constituencies.

Frank Bateson and former Chief Judge Alfred McCarthy contested the European seat.

== Results ==
Constituency	Candidate	Votes
Aitutaki	Tuakeu Puna	545
Aitutaki	Urikore Cummings	340
Aitutaki	Kiikoro Kaoki	202
Aitutaki	Tere Kainuku	186
Aitutaki	Rave Pitomaki	129
Aitutaki	Ruatangi Daniela	85
Aitutaki	Rima Tamatoa	77
Aitutaki	Ponoua Raki	48
Atiu	Vainerere Tangatapoto	141
Atiu	Ngamaru Ariki	70
Atiu	Mana Ariki	51
Atiu	Nono Tearapo	46
Atiu	Tangata Poto	41
Atiu	Michael Toki	34
Mangaia	Ngatupuna Matepi	408
Mangaia	Maarateina Atatoa	267
Mangaia	Edwin Gold	17
Mangaia	Puati Ngatama	11
Manihiki	Tihau Napara	56
Manihiki	Adamu Toka	51
Manihiki	Ben Ellis Jr.	47
Manihiki	Tekake William	45
Manihiki	John Dean	20
Manihiki	Apii Karaponga	11
Mauke	Dave Niovara	108
Mauke	Julian Dashwood	107
Mauke	Tangata Taia	26
Mauke	Auru Tairea	20
Mauke	Temana Ngatama	14
Mauke	Aitu Rairi	9
Mitiaro	Tama Tetava	71
Mitiaro	Taia	27
Penrhyn	Tangaroa Tangaroa	238
Penrhyn	Parekaa Tereora	48
Penrhyn	Tiavare Tini Josepha	26
Penrhyn	Tinirau Tata	15
Penrhyn	Nikau Mita	8
Penrhyn	Mahutapiki Pange	8
Pukapuka	Ine Rutera	138
Pukapuka	Arona Tariau	77
Pukapuka	Paata Eliu	69
Pukapuka	Henry Winau	63
Pukapuka	Taumaina Utarenga	28
Rakahanga	Toka Mataio	37
Rakahanga	Umutai George Greig	32
Rakahanga	Ngametua	16
Rakahanga	Tupou Piho	6
Rarotonga	William Hugh Watson	1,628
Rarotonga	Glassie Strickland	723
Rarotonga	Tamarua Joseph Browne	620
Rarotonga	Napa Tauei Napa	548
Rarotonga	Teariki Tuavera	496
Rarotonga	Frederick Aratiri Rennie	473
Rarotonga	Manea Tamarua	434
Rarotonga	Apenera Short	418
Rarotonga	Tui Pori Makea	376
Rarotonga	Ngaeikura Tou	367
Rarotonga	Ernest Taripo	339
Rarotonga	Naea Teariki Maurangi	318
Rarotonga	Teariki Puia	220
Rarotonga	Pu Tamaiva	190
Rarotonga	Tita Enoka Anautoa	112
European	Frank Bateson	94
European	Alfred McCarthy	59
Aitutaki Island Council	Kau Mapu	—
Atiu Island Council	Teariki Vaine	—
Mangaia Island Council	Pokino Aberahama	—
Rarotonga Island Council	Makea Nui Teremoana Ariki	—
Rarotonga Island Council	Margaret Makea Karika Ariki	—
Rarotonga Island Council	Dick Charles Brown	—
Rarotonga Island Council	Areora Ira	—
