= Glassie Strickland =

Cook Islands missionary, businessman and politician

Glassie Strickland MBE JP

Member of the Legislative Assembly
- In office 1958–1961

Personal details
- Born: 1894 Aitutaki
- Died: 21 March 1966 (aged 71–72) Rarotonga, Cook Islands

Glassie Davy George Strickland (1894 – 21 March 1966) was a Cook Islands missionary, businessman and politician. He served as a member of the Legislative Assembly between 1958 and 1961.

== Biography ==
Strickland was born in Aitutaki and was educated at Tereora College in Rarotonga. He worked for the London Missionary Society as a steward on its John Williams ship for six years before working for the Union Steam Ship Company and Jagger and Harveys, where he eventually became manager of the Cook Islands branch of the company. He became secretary of the Cook Islands Christian Church in 1945 and also served as an assistant pastor. He served as president of a sports club in Rarotonga.

After leaving Jagger and Harveys in 1955, he opened a bakery in Avarua. He was elected to the Legislative Assembly in the 1958 elections, serving until 1961. During his time in the Legislative Assembly, he was a member of the Finance Committee and Public Works Committee. He later became President of the Cook Islands Party founded by his nephew Albert Henry.

A justice of the peace, Strickland was appointed a Member of the Order of the British Empire in the 1966 New Year Honours, for services to the people of the Cook Islands, especially in the field of public welfare. Soon afterwards, he died at Rarotonga Hospital in March 1966 at the age of 72.
