= Poko Ingram =

Cook Islands chief, politician and community worker

Member of the Legislative Assembly
- In office 1961–1965
- Constituency: Rarotonga

Personal details
- Born: 14 February 1919 Maraerenga, Cook Islands
- Died: 14 September 1984 (aged 65) Nikao, Cook Islands

Poko Ingram (4 February 1919 – 13 September 1984) was a Cook Islands chief, politician and community worker. She was elected to the Legislative Assembly in 1961, becoming one of the first two women directly elected to the islands' legislature.

== Biography ==
Ingram was born in Maraerenga, the daughter of Takiora and William Kelly. She attended Avarua School, and was awarded the Sir Maui Pomare medal for being its outstanding pupil, receiving the prize from New Zealand Prime Minister George Forbes. The previous year she had toured New Zealand as part of the Cook Islands delegation of arikis for the 100 year celebrations of the Treaty of Waitangi. A mataiapo, in 1939 she married Jim Ingram, with whom she started a business, J.P.I. Ltd. The firm ran a cinema, several shops (including the largest in Rarotonga) and had shares in a clothes factory. From 1946 to 1949 she lived in Western Samoa, followed by a year in New Zealand, before returning to the Cook Islands in 1951.

In 1961 she contested the Rarotonga seat and was elected to the Legislative Assembly, becoming the first directly elected woman in the Assembly alongside Teupoko'ina Utanga Morgan. During the era of constitutional development, Ingram was in favour of the Cook Islands integrating into New Zealand. She remained in office until 1965, when she and her husband left for New Zealand. After returning to the Cook Islands, she joined the Democratic Party, and was a candidate for the party in the 1974 elections. Outside politics, Ingram was the secretary of the Rarotonga Child Welfare group, and also founded and was the first president of the Cook Islands Women's Association.

She died in Nikao in September 1984.
