= Taru Moana =

Cook Islands politician

Member of the Legislative Assembly
- In office 1965–1974
- Preceded by: Ine Rutera
- Succeeded by: William Heather
- Constituency: Puaikura

Personal details
- Died: 1 August 1988; Arorangi, Cook Islands
- Political party: Cook Islands Party

Taru Moana (died 1 August 1988) was a Cook Islands chief and politician. He served as a member of the Legislative Assembly from 1965 to 1974.

== Biography ==
Moana was a farmer, chief and church leader, serving as president of the Kouti Nui group of chiefs in Arorangi and as a spokesman for the Tinomana ariki.

A supporter of the Cook Islands Progressive Association, he joined the Cook Islands Party after its establishment in 1964. He contested the Puaikura seat in the 1965 general elections and was elected to the Legislative Assembly. He was re-elected in 1968 and 1972, but lost his seat in the 1974 elections.

He died in Arorangi in August 1988.
