= Dick Charles Brown =

Cook Islands politician (1905–1969)

Leader of Government Business
- In office 9 November 1963 – 10 May 1965
- Monarch: Elizabeth II
- Governor-General: Bernard Fergusson
- Preceded by: Office Established
- Succeeded by: Manea Tamarua

Member of the Legislative Assembly
- In office 1958–1965
- Constituency: Rarotonga

Personal details
- Born: 1905 Mangaia, Cook Islands
- Died: 6 May 1969 (aged 63) Rarotonga, Cook Islands
- Spouse: Mata Goringo
- Children: 6

Dick Charles Brown (1905 – 6 May 1969) was a Cook Islands businessman and politician. He served as a member of the Legislative Assembly between 1958 and 1965, and became the territory's first Leader of Government Business in 1963.

== Biography ==
Brown was born in Mangaia in 1905, one of the 18 children of George and Rakiki Brown. He moved to Rarotonga at the age of 18 to work for A.B. Donald, before taking up planting and setting up his own store in Tupapa. He subsequently opened several other stores and enlarged his plantations. During World War II he sold Cook Islands handicrafts to American Service personnel based across the Pacific, before diversifying into copra and pearl shell.

After the war, Brown owned a series of ships. Having become one of the wealthiest people in the Cook Islands, he donated money to Rarotonga Island Council to seal the main road, and provided a loan to the Co-operative Society to help them buy Manuae island. When Tereora College was established in 1955, he became chair of its committee. He married Mata Goringo; the couple had six children.

In 1956 he entered politics and was elected to Rarotonga Island Council. He was elected to the Legislative Assembly in 1958 as one of the indirectly-elected representatives of Rarotonga Island Council. He was re-elected in the 1961 elections, this time as one of the directly elected members. In 1962 an Executive Committee was established, with Brown as one of the members. In November 1963 the Executive Committee was replaced by a new cabinet, with Brown elected the first Leader of Government business, defeating Ngatupuna Matepi by a vote of 11–10. By virtue of his position, Brown was expected to become the Cook Islands' first Premier when self-government was achieved in 1965. He led the United Political Party into the 1965 elections, but lost his seat.

Although the elections had been won by the Cook Islands Party (CIP), the CIP leader Albert Henry had been ineligible for election due to the residency requirements in place at the time of the vote. On 12 May 1965 the legislature voted to reduce the residency requirement to three months (providing the candidate had previously lived in the Cook Islands for at least a year). Henry's sister Marguerite Story subsequently resigned from the Assembly to allow Henry to contest the by-election for Te-au-o-Tonga on 9 July. Brown stood against him, but lost by 1,353 votes to 523. Henry went on to become the islands' first Premier. Brown declared his intention to contest the 1968 elections as an independent, but later withdrew his candidacy.

He died in Rarotonga Hospital in May 1969 at the age of 63.
