= Samuela Samuela =

Former Cook Islands politician

Member of the Legislative Assembly
- In office 1965–1970
- Constituency: Takitumu

Personal details
- Died: 1970
- Political party: Cook Islands Party

Samuela Samuela (died 1970) was a Cook Islands politician. He served as a member of the Legislative Assembly from 1965 until his death.

== Biography ==
Samuela was a farmer and involved with the Catholic church. He was selected as Matavera district candidate for Cook Islands Party, contesting the Takitumu constituency in the 1965 elections. He was subsequently elected to the Legislative Assembly, and re-elected in the 1968 elections.

Samuela died in 1970, and was survived by his wife and eleven children.
