= Vainerere Tangatapoto =

Cook Islands chief, educator and politician (1912–1986)

Member of the Legislative Assembly
- In office 1968–1983
- Preceded by: Mariri Paratainga
- In office 1958–1965
- Constituency: Atiu

Personal details
- Born: 1 July 1912 Atiu, Cook Islands
- Died: 19 January 1986 (aged 73) Mangaia, Cook Islands

Vainerere Tangatapoto OBE (1 July 1912 – 19 January 1986) was a Cook Islands chief, educator and politician. He served as member of the Legislative Assembly in two spells between 1958 and 1983.

== Biography ==
Tangatapoto was born in July 1912 in Atiu, the son of Akemarae and Tangatapoto. Having won the Sir Maui Pomare medal for being an outstanding pupil twice during his education on Atiu, he became a teacher at Atiu Primary School in 1927 the age of 15. In 1934 he joined the Tagua ship as a cabin boy under Andy Thomson and followed him to the Tiare Taporo. He returned to teaching at the primary school in 1940 and became the first local headteacher in 1951. He also served as a church deacon, founded Atiu's first youth club and public library, and also established the Cook Islands branch of the Boys' and Girls' Brigades, the latter in 1972. He was married to Tuerei and had ten children.

Conferred with the title of ariki, he served as speaker of the Atiu House of Ariki. In the 1958 elections, the first under universal suffrage, he was elected to the Cook Islands Legislative Assembly from the Atiu constituency. He was re-elected in 1961 and the following year was elected to the Executive Committee, the islands' first cabinet, by members of the legislature.

Although he lost his seat in the 1965 elections, which he contested as a United Political Party candidate, he was elected again in 1968 as a representative of the United Cook Islanders party, which he led from 1970 to 1971. He subsequently joined the new Democratic Party and was re-elected in 1972, 1974 and 1978. Following the 1978 elections, he became Deputy Speaker. He was awarded the Queen Elizabeth II Silver Jubilee Medal in 1977, and retired from politics prior to the March 1983 elections. He was awarded an OBE in the 1983 New Year Honours.

He died in Mangaia in January 1986 at the age of 73. After his death the government set up the Vainerere Tangatapoto Foundation Fund for Uniformed Organisations.
