= Kau Mapu =

Cook Islands chief and politician

Member of the Legislative Assembly
- In office 1957–1965
- Constituency: Aitutaki

Personal details
- Died: 20 November 1979 (age 72); Aitutaki, Cook Islands

Kau Mapu (died 20 November 1979) was a Cook Islands chief, civil servant and politician. He was a member of the Legislative Assembly between 1958 and 1965.

== Biography ==
Mapu was descended from several Ariki families and held the title Tearikivao Putokotoko Pareraka Mataiapo. He was a civil servant, working in the Public Works department. In 1958 he was elected to the new Legislative Assembly as a representative of Aitutaki Island Council. He was re-elected in 1961, but the Island Council seats were abolished at the 1965 elections.

He died at his home in Aitutaki in November 1979 at the age of 72.
