= Tiakana Numanga =

Cook Islands politician (1909–1977)

Deputy Premier
- In office 1974–1977

Minister of Fisheries and Police
- In office 1972–1974
- Preceded by: Apenera Short

Minister of Education
- In office 1968–1972
- Succeeded by: Geoffrey Henry

Minister of Health
- In office 1967–1968
- Succeeded by: Inatio Akaruru

Minister of Police and Social Development
- In office –1967
- Preceded by: Julian Dashwood

Minister for Public Works and Survey
- In office 1965–
- Preceded by: Tangaroa Tangaroa
- Succeeded by: Julian Dashwood

Member of the Legislative Assembly
- In office 1965–1977
- Succeeded by: Iaveta Short
- Constituency: Takitumu

Personal details
- Born: 3 August 1909 Titikaveka, Cook Islands
- Died: 1977 (aged 67–68)
- Party: Cook Islands Party

Tiakana Numanga (3 August 1909 – 1977) was a Cook Islands politician. He served as a member of the Legislative Assembly between 1965 and his death and held several ministerial portfolios, including being Deputy Premier.

== Biography ==
Numanga was born in Titikaveka in 1909. He began work as a schoolteacher in 1927, later becoming a planter and running a bakery and store. In 1931 he married Meoroa, with whom he had two daughters and a son.

Numanga contested the 1965 elections as a Cook Islands Party candidate in the Takitumu constituency, and was elected to the Legislative Assembly. Following the elections, he was appointed to the Executive Council and became Minister for Public Works and Survey and Associate Minister of Labour. He swapped portfolios with Julian Dashwood, becoming Minister of Police and Social Development for a short period, before a cabinet reshuffle in January 1967 saw him appointed Minister for Health.

He was re-elected in 1968 and became Minister of Education. Following the 1972 elections he was appointed Minister of Fisheries and Police. After being re-elected again in 1974, he was dropped from the cabinet. However, after threatening to join the opposition, he was appointed Deputy Premier.

In 1977, Numanga was awarded the Queen Elizabeth II Silver Jubilee Medal. He died in 1977.
