= 1961 Cook Islands general election =

General elections were held in the Cook Islands in May 1961.

== Electoral system ==
The 27 members of the Legislative Assembly consisted of 15 directly elected members (14 from ten general constituencies and one from a European voter constituency), seven members indirectly elected by Island Councils (four from Rarotonga and one from Aitutaki, Atiu and Mangaia), and five officials members, including the Resident Commissioner as President of the Assembly, the Administration Secretary, the Treasurer and two members appointed by the Resident Commissioner.

== Results ==
Constituency	Member	Notes
Aitutaki	William Estall	New member
Aitutaki	Matai Simiona	New member
Atiu	Vainerere Tangatapoto	Re-elected
Mangaia	Pokino Aberahama	Previously Island Council representative
Manihiki	Ben Ellis Jnr	New member
Mauke	Terii Taripo	New member
Mitiaro	Tiki Tetava Ariki	
Penrhyn	Tangaroa Tangaroa	Re-elected
Puaikura	Ine Rutera	Re-elected
Rakahanga	Turuta Temu	New member
Rarotonga	Dick Charles Brown	New member
Rarotonga	Poko Ingram	New member
Rarotonga	Teupoko'ina Utanga Morgan	New member
Rarotonga	Teakura Roi	New member
European	Les Bailey	New member
Aitutaki Island Council	Kau Mapu	Re-elected
Atiu Island Council	Parua Ariki	New member
Mangaia Island Council	Ngatupuna Matepi	Previously a directly elected member
Rarotonga Island Council	Makea Nui Teremoana Ariki	Re-elected
Rarotonga Island Council	Areora Ira	Re-elected
Rarotonga Island Council	Napa Tauei Napa	Previously a directly elected member
Rarotonga Island Council	Teariki Tuavera	New member
Source: Pacific Islands Monthly

=== Appointed members ===
Position	Member
Resident Commissioner	Oliver Dare
Chief Medical Officer	T.T. Romans
Director of Education	R.D. McEwan
Secretary to the Government	L.K. Pitt
Treasurer	T.N. Perry
Source: Pacific Islands Monthly

== Aftermath ==
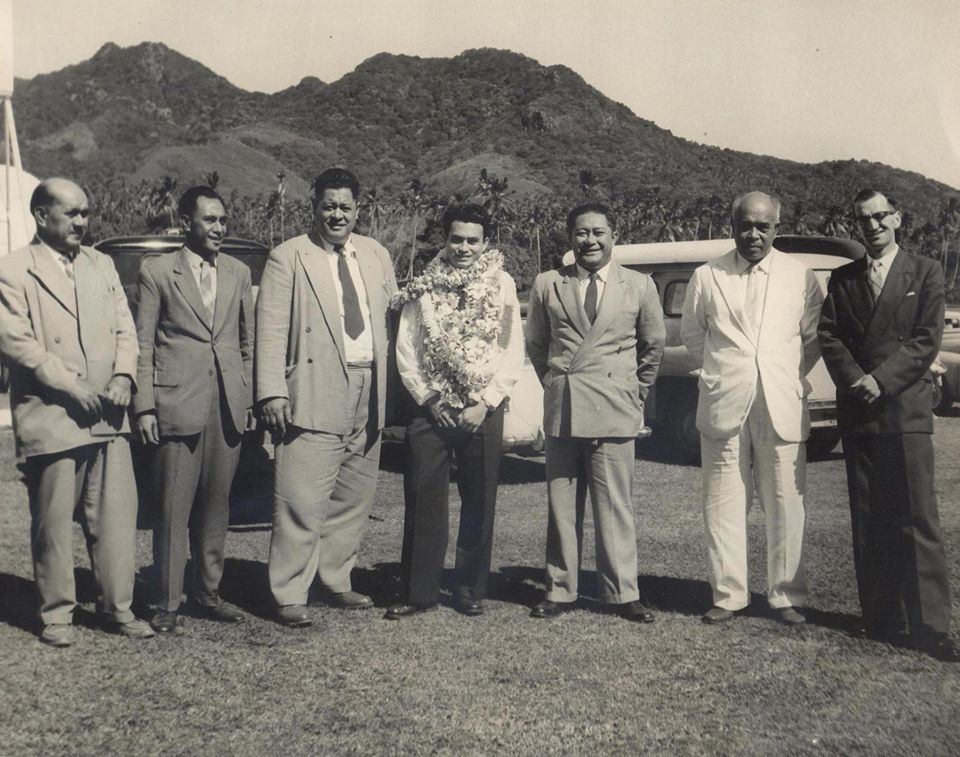
The Executive Committee of the Cook Islands legislature in 1962

In 1962 an Executive Committee was established, with its members elected by the Assembly. It initially consisted of Les Bailey, Dick Charles Brown, William Estall, Ngatupuna Matepi, Vainerere Tangatapoto, Tangaroa Tangaroa and Teariki Tuavera, together with the Government Secretary and the Treasurer.

By-elections in 1963 saw Dick Rapley elected to replace Les Bailey for the European seat (Bailey was also replaced on the Executive Committee by Napa Tauei Napa), Julian Dashwood becoming the MLA for Mauke and David Marama Hosking becoming an MLA for Ratotonga, replacing Teupoko'ina Morgan after she emigrated to New Zealand

In November 1963 the Executive Committee was revamped, becoming a "shadow cabinet" with defined portfolios. Dick Charles Brown was elected the first Leader of Government business, defeating Ngatupuna Matepi by a vote of 11–10. A new speaker was also appointed, with Teariki Tuavera defeating Ngatapuna Matepi in a secret ballot.

1963 Executive Committee portfolios
Portfolio	Member
Leader of Government Business	Dick Charles Brown
Deputy Leader	William Estall
Customs, Finance, Inland Revenue, Labour, Post Office, Radio, Shipping & Air, Treasury	William Estall
Agriculture, Co-operatives, Freezer, Hotel	Napa Tauei Napa
Broadcasting, Health, Justice, Police and Prisons, Social Development	Julian Dashwood
Education, Power, Printing, Public Works, Surveys	Tangaroa Tangaroa
