= 1968 Cook Islands general election =

- 1 May 1968
- All 22 seats in the Legislative Assembly; 13 seats needed for a majority
Party	Leader	Vote %	Seats	+/–
Cook Islands	Albert Henry	65.12	16	+2
UCI	Ngatupuna Matepi	32.91	6	New
This lists parties that won seats. See the complete results below.
Premier before	Premier after
Albert Henry; Cook Islands	Albert Henry; Cook Islands

General elections were held in the Cook Islands on 1 May 1968. The result was a victory for the Cook Islands Party (CIP), which won 16 seats, a gain of two from the 1965 elections. The newly formed United Cook Islanders won the other six seats to become the parliamentary opposition. CIP leader Albert Henry continued as prime minister.

== Campaign ==
In February a new party, the United Cook Islanders (UCI), was formed. Its members included former cabinet members Mana Strickland and Manea Tamarua. The new party launched its manifesto on 8 April.

A total of 55 candidates contested the elections; 23 from the CIP (two candidates from the party ran against each other in Pukapuka, and four candidates from the party contested the three seats in Takitumu), 18 from the UCI and six independents. Former Leader of Government Business Dick Charles Brown had intended to run as an independent, but withdrew. The CIP candidates were returned unopposed in Mauke and Mitiaro.

The campaign period during April saw meetings held almost every night, with CIP meetings initially drawing crowds of several hundred, rising to over 1,300 by the end of the campaign. In contrast, UCI meetings were usually attended by fewer than 100 people.

== Results ==
The CIP won all nine seats in Rarotonga, and gained the three Aitutaki seats, which had been won by the Independent Group in 1965. The UCI's former ministers, Strickland and Tamarua, both lost their seats.

Party	Votes	%	Seats	+/–
Cook Islands Party	12,569	65.12	16	+2
United Cook Islanders	6,352	32.91	6	New
Independents	379	1.96	0	0
Total	19,300	100.00	22	0
Valid votes	6,858	99.23		
Invalid/blank votes	53	0.77		
Total votes	6,911	100.00		
Registered voters/turnout	7,603	90.90		
Source: Stone

=== By electorate ===
Constituency	Candidate	Party	Votes
Aitutaki–Manuae	William Estall	Cook Islands	890
Aitutaki–Manuae	Joseph Williams	Cook Islands	888
Aitutaki–Manuae	Ngaa Upu	Cook Islands	816
Aitutaki–Manuae	Dora Harrington	Independent	146
Aitutaki–Manuae	John Robert George Dick	Independent	89
Aitutaki–Manuae	Rata Toa	Independent	72
Atiu	Vainerere Tangatapoto	United Cook Islanders	314
Atiu	Tangata Simiona	United Cook Islanders	280
Atiu	Mariri Paratainga	Cook Islands	185
Atiu	Pakari Tutai	Cook Islands	135
Mangaia	Ngatupuna Matepi	United Cook Islanders	594
Mangaia	Pokino Aberahama	United Cook Islanders	587
Mangaia	Turaraiti Pekepo	Cook Islands	164
Manihiki	Nato Temu	Cook Islands	115
Manihiki	Mareko Mareko	United Cook Islanders	53
Manihiki	Ben Pukerua	Independent	33
Manihiki	Glassie Strickland	Independent	29
Mauke	Tupui Ariki Henry	Cook Islands	Unopposed
Mitiaro	Raui Pokoati	Cook Islands	Unopposed
Penrhyn	Tangaroa Tangaroa	United Cook Islanders	219
Penrhyn	Tuauri Hakaoro	Cook Islands	42
Penrhyn	Fred Ford	Independent	10
Puaikura	Taru Moana	Cook Islands	550
Puaikura	Tamataia Pera Maurangi	Cook Islands	547
Puaikura	Alexander Munro	United Cook Islanders	287
Puaikura	Napa Tauei Napa	United Cook Islanders	282
Pukapuka–Nassau	Inatio Akaruru	Cook Islands	233
Pukapuka–Nassau	John Tariau	Cook Islands	134
Rakahanga	Pupuke Robati	United Cook Islanders	90
Rakahanga	Howard Howard	Cook Islands	32
Takitumu	Apenera Short	Cook Islands	574
Takitumu	Tiakana Numanga	Cook Islands	532
Takitumu	Samuela Samuela	Cook Islands	396
Takitumu	Jean Domonique Upoko Crummer Peyroux	United Cook Islanders	305
Takitumu	Kamate Areora Ira	United Cook Islanders	301
Takitumu	William Cowan	United Cook Islanders	276
Takitumu	Taramai Tetonga	Cook Islands	198
Te-au-o-Tonga	Albert Henry	Cook Islands	1,682
Te-au-o-Tonga	Teanua Kamana	Cook Islands	1,568
Te-au-o-Tonga	Teaukura Roi	Cook Islands	1,470
Te-au-o-Tonga	Kamate Nangaiti	Cook Islands	1,418
Te-au-o-Tonga	Manea Teariki Tamarua	United Cook Islanders	717
Te-au-o-Tonga	Mana Strickland	United Cook Islanders	694
Te-au-o-Tonga	David Marama Hosking	United Cook Islanders	679
Te-au-o-Tonga	Marama Tepou Nicholas	United Cook Islanders	674
Source: Cook Islands Gazette, Stone, Pacific Islands Monthly
