= 1978 Cook Islands general election =

- 30 March 1978
- 22 seats in the Legislative Assembly; 13 seats needed for a majority
Party	Leader	Seats	+/–
Cook Islands	Albert Henry	15	+1
Democratic	Thomas Davis	7	−1
This lists parties that won seats. See the complete results below.
Premier before	Premier after
Albert Henry; Cook Islands	Albert Henry; Cook Islands

General elections were held in the Cook Islands on 30 March 1978 to elect members of the Legislative Assembly. The result was a victory for the Cook Islands Party (CIP) of Premier Albert Henry, which won 15 of the 22 seats. The Democratic Party won the remaining seven seats.

Following the elections, the Democratic Party challenged the results, claiming Henry had used public funds to subsidise flights that brought expatriate CIP supporters back to the Cook Islands to vote, which cost around $300,000. The election of nine CIP MPs was subsequently overturned by an electoral court, allowing Democratic Party leader Tom Davis – who had lost his seat before being reinstated as a result of the ruling – to become Premier. Henry was subsequently convicted of conspiracy and misuse of public money, and later stripped of his knighthood.

== Background ==
Elections were called six months early by Henry, hoping to capitalise on divisions in the Democratic Party during a leadership challenge. Prior to the elections, three prominent CIP members, William Estall, Raui Pokoati and Joe Williams, left the party. Williams subsequently established the Unity Party.

As overseas voting was not possible, Cook Islanders had to return to the islands to vote. Special polling stations were set up at Rarotonga International Airport. Both the CIP and the Democratic Party persuaded supporters to fly from New Zealand, with six planeloads of CIP supporters travelling at a subsidised cost of $20 each, and two planeloads of Democratic Party supporters, who paid the full fare. Around 800 supporters of the CIP were transported on Ansett planes, with Democratic Party supporters travelling by Air Nauru.

== Results ==
Party	Seats	+/–
Cook Islands Party	15	+1
Democratic Party	7	–1
Unity Party	0	New
Total	22	0
Source: Pacific Islands Monthly

=== By electorate ===
Constituency	Candidate	Votes
Aitutaki–Manuae	Kura Strickland	654
Aitutaki–Manuae	Geoffrey Henry	639
Aitutaki–Manuae	Ngereteina Puna	636
Aitutaki–Manuae	Matai Simiona	252
Aitutaki–Manuae	Koekoe John Mokotupu	203
Aitutaki–Manuae	Sadaraka Metuakore Sadaraka	194
Aitutaki–Manuae	William John Estall	65
Aitutaki–Manuae	Tere Aaron Marsters	53
Atiu	Vainerere Tangatapoto	252
Atiu	Tangata Simiona	247
Atiu	Franco Mateariki	212
Atiu	Tepou Boaza	209
Atiu	Paul Pomani Tangata	7
Mangaia	Papamama Pokino	370
Mangaia	Matepi Matepi	367
Mangaia	Torotoro Kimiravenga	160
Mangaia	Tere Evangelia Aratangi	140
Manihiki	George Frederick Ellis Jr.	92
Manihiki	Epinisa Toma	64
Mauke	Tupui Ariki Henry	188
Mauke	Julian Dashwood	72
Mitiaro	David Tetava	66
Mitiaro	Raui Pokoati	49
Mitiaro	Celina James Scott	2
Penrhyn	Tangaroa Tangaroa	145
Penrhyn	Walter Benedito	69
Penrhyn	Fred Ford	6
Puaikura	Jimmy Mareiti	541
Puaikura	Raymond Pirangi	517
Puaikura	William Heather	509
Puaikura	Harry Napa	490
Puaikura	Joseph Williams	37
Pukapuka–Nassau	Inatio Akaruru	313
Pukapuka–Nassau	Mataora Tutai	62
Rakahanga	Pupuke Robati	70
Rakahanga	Turuta Temu	47
Takitumu	Matapo Matapo	603
Takitumu	Apenera Short	599
Takitumu	Teariki Matenga	565
Takitumu	Iaveta Short	564
Takitumu	Taramai Tetonga	555
Takitumu	William Cowan	530
Takitumu	Tuainekore-o-turepu Keenan	31
Te-au-o-Tonga	Albert Henry	1,420
Te-au-o-Tonga	Lionel George Browne	1,363
Te-au-o-Tonga	Teanua Dan Kamana	1,353
Te-au-o-Tonga	Rei Jack	1,323
Te-au-o-Tonga	Thomas Davis	1,248
Te-au-o-Tonga	Vincent Ingram	1,201
Te-au-o-Tonga	Fred Goodwin	1,173
Te-au-o-Tonga	Teariki Piri	1,173
Te-au-o-Tonga	Enua Bishop	41
Te-au-o-Tonga	Thomas Tixier	40
Te-au-o-Tonga	Michael Tavioni	39

== Aftermath ==
Immediately after the elections, the electoral law was amended to prevent Cook Islanders living overseas from voting, with a requirement to have been resident for three months prior to election day introduced.

The results of the three Rarotonga constituencies were challenged by the Democratic Party. The petitions were heard in an electoral court presided over by Chief Justice Gaven Donne, which sat in Auckland, Rarotonga and Wellington in May and June. It was revealed that Henry had paid $290,000 for the flights for CIP supporters back to the Cook Islands to vote using a specially founded government company.

The votes cast by the CIP voters who flew in were annulled, resulting in eight of the CIP MLAs elected in Rarotonga losing their seats and being replaced by the losing Democratic Party candidates including Tom Davis. The result in Mitiaro, where David Tetava of the CIP was elected, was also overturned due to corrupt practices and a by-election ordered on 5 October 1978. David Tetava died before the election, and the only other candidate, Tiki Tetava, was elected unopposed.

With the Democratic Party now holding a 15–6 majority in the Legislative Assembly, Davis formed a new government. He retained the portfolios of Finance and Economic Development for himself, and appointed Pupuke Robati as Deputy Premier and Minister of Health, Vincent Ingram as Minister of Justice and Police, Papamama Pokino as Minister for Supportive Services, Iaveta Short as Minister of Agriculture and Tourism, Tangata Simoiona as Minister of Education and Tangaroa Tangaroa as Minister of Internal Affairs. Titi Tetava Ariki won the subsequent by-election in Mitiaro.
