= Joe Williams (Cook Islands politician) =

Cook Islands doctor and politician (1934–2020)

Joe Williams QSO
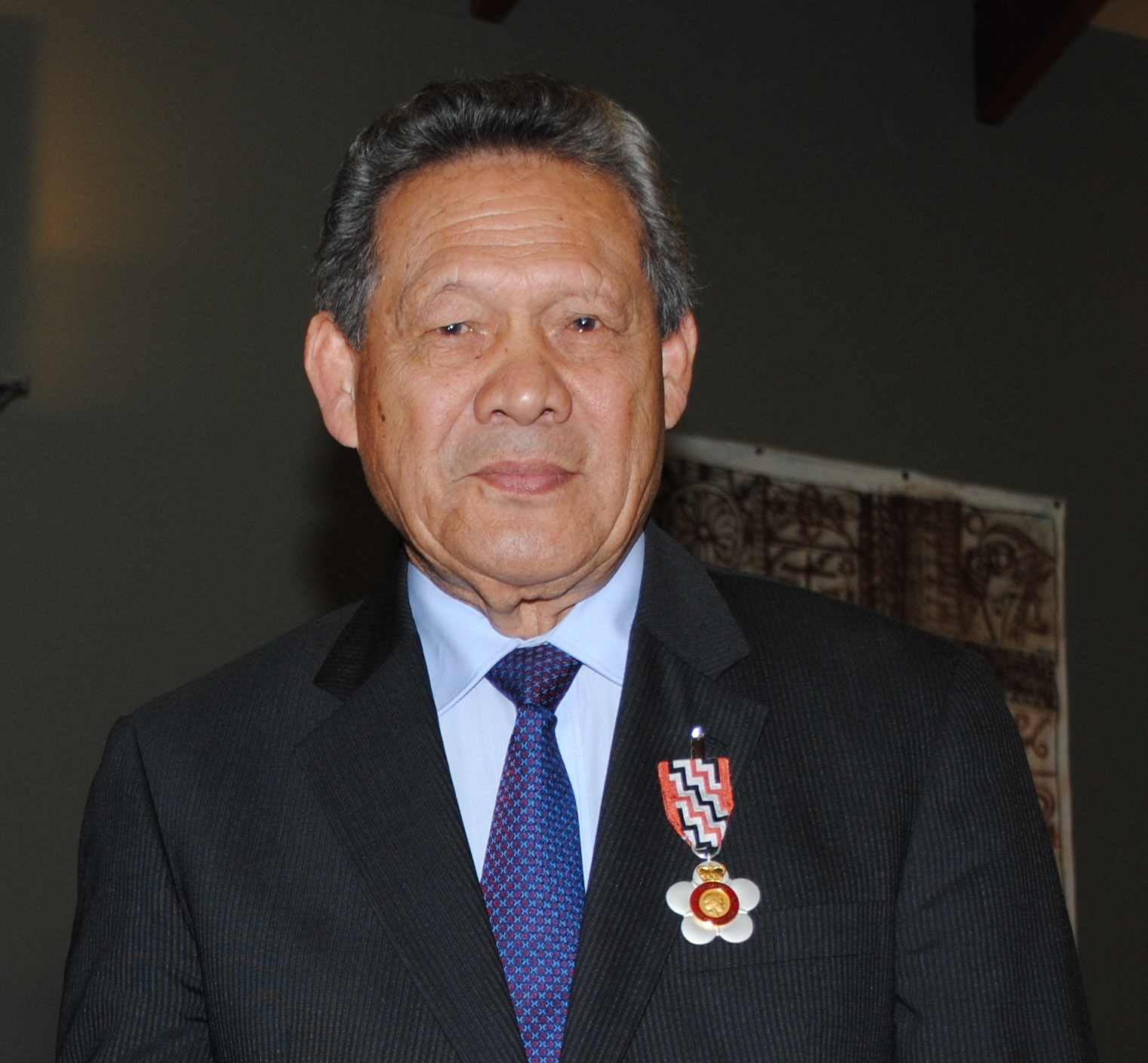
- Williams in 2011

7th Prime Minister of the Cook Islands
- In office 29 July 1999 – 18 November 1999
- Monarch: Elizabeth II
- Deputy: Norman George; Tupou Faireka
- Queen's Representative: Apenera Short
- Preceded by: Geoffrey Henry
- Succeeded by: Terepai Maoate
Additional Ministries
Minister of Foreign Affairs
In office 29 July 1999 – 18 November 1999
Prime Minister	Himself
Preceded by	Inatio Akaruru
Succeeded by	Robert Woonton
Minister of Health and Education
In office 1974–1978
Prime Minister	Albert Henry
Minister of Health, Tourism, Transport and State-Owned Enterprises
In office 1994–1996
Prime Minister	Geoffrey Henry
Succeeded by

Member of the Cook Islands Parliament for Overseas
- In office 24 March 1994 – 7 September 2004
- Preceded by: Iaveta Arthur
- Succeeded by: None (Constituency abolished)

Personal details
- Born: 4 October 1934 Aitutaki, Cook Islands
- Died: 4 September 2020 (aged 85) Auckland, New Zealand
- Party: Cook Islands Party
- Education: Otago Medical School, University of Hawaiʻi

Joseph Williams QSO (4 October 1934 – 4 September 2020) was a Cook Islands politician and physician who served as Prime Minister of the Cook Islands for four months in 1999. He is credited with having worked to prevent the spread of the tropical disease lymphatic filariasis (elephantiasis). He principally resided in Auckland, New Zealand, where he was medical director of the Mt Wellington Integrated Family Health Centre.

== Early life and family ==
Williams was born on Aitutaki on 4 October 1934, and was a descendant of William Marsters of Palmerston Island. He travelled to New Zealand in 1947, and was educated at Northland College after winning a government scholarship.

== Medical career ==
Williams graduated from Otago Medical School in 1960, and later completed a Masters in Public Health at the University of Hawaiʻi. He returned to the Cook Islands in 1964, where he worked as Medical Superintendent, surgeon, physician, Director of Health and Secretary of Social Services, while also researching tropical diseases, including filariasis.

Williams led research and public-health practices that resulted in the Cook Islands meeting “all the criteria required for the World Health Organization (WHO) to acknowledge elimination of LF [lymphatic filariasis] as a public health problem". He served as a member of the World Health Organization's executive board from 1995 to 1997 and as a member of the Program Review Group for the Global Elimination of Lymphatic Filariasis from 1998 to 2004. In 2002 the Cook Islands Government unsuccessfully nominated Williams to head the World Health Organization.

In 1999, Williams was reportedly found by New Zealand's Health and Disability Commissioner to have breached ethical standards when one of his patients was misdiagnosed and given tablets that were past their expiry date.

In 2002, Williams became involved in a controversy regarding a proposed medical trial in the Cook Islands. The trial, which involved injecting pig cells into humans as a means of fighting diabetes, could not legally take place in New Zealand, and therefore moved to the Cook Islands, where less strict regulations applied. Williams, a strong supporter of the proposal, believed that it would bring benefits to the Cook Islands' economy, but the scheme aroused much controversy.

In 2015 Williams published a book based on his clinical experience in treating eczema. Despite public support from some of his patients in 2018 Williams was fined NZ$10,000 plus NZ$145,000 in court costs, and required to practise under supervision for three years, after using unapproved treatments for eczema.

== Political career ==
Williams was first elected to the Cook Islands Parliament as a Cook Islands Party candidate for the electorate of Aitutaki in the 1968 election. He served as Minister of Health and Education from 1974 to 1978 in the government of Albert Henry, as well as being Henry's personal physician. As Health Minister, he supported Czech cancer therapist Milan Brych relocating his clinic to the Cook Islands, despite Brych being removed from the medical register in New Zealand. He was one of three prominent CIP members to have left the party immediately before the 1978 election, and subsequently contested the Arorangi electorate for the Unity Party, but lost his seat.

Williams subsequently migrated to New Zealand. He rejoined the Cook Islands Party and was re-elected in the 1994 election as its candidate for the overseas seat, representing Cook Islanders living abroad (mostly in New Zealand). He served as Minister of Health, Tourism, Transport, and State-Owned Enterprises from 1994 to 1996. Although a member of the Cook Islands Party, he opposed the premiership (1989 to 1999) of Geoffrey Henry, the party's leader from 1979 to 2006. Many members of the Cook Islands Party opposed its coalition agreement with the New Alliance Party, and after several defections, Henry lost control to the dissidents and resigned. In July 1999, Williams narrowly won endorsement as the new prime minister. This prompted considerable anger in some quarters, primarily because Williams mostly lived outside the islands. In October 1999 the New Alliance Party left the governing coalition, depriving the government of its majority. Williams attempted to form a new government, but the following month he lost a vote of no-confidence to the opposition Democratic Alliance Party and the New Alliance Party. Terepai Maoate became the new prime minister. He lost his seat when the overseas electorate was abolished in 2003.

Williams later attempted to start a political career in New Zealand, standing as a candidate for the New Zealand First party at 15th place in the party list and contesting the Maungakiekie electorate seat in the 2005 parliamentary elections. He did not succeed in becoming an MP, as he placed third in Maungakiekie and New Zealand First received only seven seats.

Williams re-entered New Zealand politics before the 2017 New Zealand general election, founding the One Pacific Movement. One Pacific later reached a deal with the Māori Party under which it ran Pasifika candidates on the Māori Party list.

== Honours ==
Williams was awarded the Queen Elizabeth II Silver Jubilee Medal in 1977, and the Pasifika Medical Association Service Award in 2004. He was appointed a Companion of the Queen's Service Order, for services to the Cook Islands community, in the 2011 New Zealand New Year Honours.

In 2015, Williams was named inaugural Patron of the Pasifika Medical Association and in 2016 he received the World Health Organization's Award of Appreciation for his contribution to eliminating lymphatic filariasis.

== Death ==
Williams was hospitalised in Auckland on 13 August 2020, after testing positive for COVID-19 during the COVID-19 pandemic in New Zealand. He died from the virus on 4 September 2020, at the age of 85.
