= Raui Pokoati =

Cook Islands politician

Member of the Legislative Assembly
- In office 1965–1978
- Preceded by: Tiki Tetava Ariki
- Succeeded by: David Tetava
- Constituency: Mitiaro

Personal details
- Born: 1911; Mitiaro, Cook Islands
- Died: 25 March 1981 (aged 69); Rarotonga, Cook Islands
- Political party: Cook Islands Party

Papa Raui Pokoati (1911 – 25 March 1981) was a Cook Islands politician. He served as a member of the Legislative Assembly for his home island of Mitiaro between 1965 and 1978.

== Biography ==
Pokoati was born on Mitiaro in 1911, the son of one of the island's three Ariki. He attended the local London Missionary Society school and went on to become a poultry farmer, planter and a pastor for the Cook Islands Christian Church. He was employed by the Department of Agriculture.

In 1964 Pokoati was a founder member of the Cook Islands Party (CIP) and part of its central committee. Although he had lived on Rarotonga for several years, he was elected to the Legislative Assembly from Mitiaro in 1965, defeating his cousin Titi Tetava Ariki. In mid-1966 he was appointed Assistant to the Minister of Economic Development. He was re-elected unopposed in 1968 and 1972.

Pokoati was re-elected again in 1974, but prior to the 1978 elections he left the CIP, establishing the Unity Party. He lost the election to David Tetava of the CIP. When Tetava's victory was annulled, Titi Tetava Ariki was elected.

In 1977, Pokoati was awarded the Queen Elizabeth II Silver Jubilee Medal.

He died in March 1981 in Rarotonga hospital at the age of 69, survived by his wife and nine children.
