= 2000 Pukapuka-Nassau by-election =

Election in the Cook Islands

- 29 September 1999

Constituency of Pukapuka–Nassau
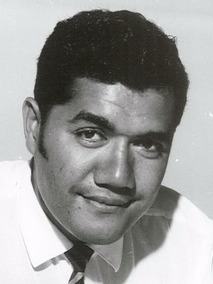
	First party	Second party
	DP
Candidate	Tiaki Wuatai	Inatio Akaruru
Party	Democratic	Cook Islands
Popular vote	210	206
Percentage	50.5%	49.5%
MP before election
Inatio Akaruru
Cook Islands
Elected MP
Te-Hani Brown
Democratic

The 2000 Pukapuka-Nassau by-election was a by-election in the Cook Islands electorate of Pukapuka-Nassau. It took place on 28 September 2000.

The by-election was caused by the invalidation of the 1999 Pukapuka-Nassau by-election. The Cook Islands Parliament subsequently passed an Electoral Amendment Act providing for a second by-election and the re-registration of voters in the electorate. The election was contested by two candidates, and won by the Democratic Alliance Party's Tiaki Wuatai.

Pukapuka by-election 2011
Party	Candidate	Votes	%	±%
Democratic	Tiaki Wuatai	210	50.5%	
Cook Islands	Inatio Akaruru	206	49.5%	
Turnout		416		
