= Julian Dashwood =

Cook Islands politician (1899–1970)

Minister for Public Works and Survey
- In office –1966
- Succeeded by: Albert Henry

Minister of Police and Social Development
- In office 1965–
- Succeeded by: Tiakana Numanga

Member for Broadcasting, Health, Justice, Police, Prisons and Social Development
- In office 1963–1964
- Succeeded by: Ngatupuna Matepi

Member of the Legislative Assembly
- In office 1963–1966
- Preceded by: Terii Taripo
- Succeeded by: Tupui Henry
- Constituency: Mauke

Personal details
- Born: 1899 United Kingdom
- Died: 5 September 1970 (aged 70–71) Mauke, Cook Islands

Robert Julian Dashwood (1899 – 5 September 1970) was a British-born Cook Islands writer and politician. He was a member of the Legislative Assembly between 1963 and 1966 and served in the territory's first two cabinets.

== Biography ==
Dashwood was born in England in 1899, the son of a vicar. During World War I he served in the Royal Navy and Royal Air Force. Following the war, a varied career saw him become a teacher in England, a farmer in Transvaal and a rubber plantation owner in Malaya. He also worked as a car salesman and shell dealer.

He relocated to the Cook Islands in 1929, where he became manager of a shop owned by A.B. Donald & Co. Initially settling in Rakahanga, he later moved to Mauke, where he married a local woman named Kopu. He began writing under the pen name Julian Hillas (his mother's maiden name), publishing books including I Know an Island and Today is Forever (republished as South Seas Paradise), as well as having several articles printed in Pacific Islands Monthly.

Dashwood was elected to Legislative Assembly from the Mauke constituency in a 1963 by-election. In November 1963 the Executive Committee was revamped, with members given specific portfolios. Leader of Government Business Dick Charles Brown appointed Dashwood as the Member for Broadcasting, Health, Justice, Police, Prisons and Social Development. However, he was sacked in August 1964 after refusing to resign, due to suspicions that he supported Brown's rival Albert Henry.

Dashwood subsequently joined Henry's Cook Islands Party, and was re-elected to the Legislative Assembly in the 1965 elections. He was then reappointed to the Executive Committee in May. In August a new cabinet was formed, with Dashwood appointed Minister of Police and Social Development and Associate Minister for the Post Office, Hotel and Printing Office. Soon afterwards he swapped portfolios with Tiakana Numanga, becoming Minister for Public Works and Survey. However, he resigned from the cabinet in May 1966, and the following month was convicted of corruptly attempting to obtain a bribe whilst a Minister of the Crown. As a result, he lost his seat in the Legislative Assembly.

He died at his home on Mauke in September 1970.
