= Teupoko'ina Utanga Morgan =

Cook Island educator, politician and author (1934–2007)

Teupokoina Morgan

Member of the Legislative Assembly
- In office 1961–1962
- Constituency: Rarotonga

Personal details
- Born: 1 October 1934 Avarua, Cook Islands
- Died: 15 September 2007 (aged 72) Waikato, New Zealand

Teupoko'ina Utanga Morgan QSM (1 October 1934 – 15 September 2007) was a Cook Islands educator, politician and writer of children's books and song books. She was elected to the Legislative Assembly in 1961, becoming one of the first two women directly elected to the islands' legislature.

== Biography ==
Morgan was born in Avarua in 1934, the oldest of six children of Ripeka and Utanga Utanga. She was educated at Rarotonga Primary School and then won a government scholarship to attend St Matthew's Collegiate School in Masterton in New Zealand. She studied at Ardmore Teachers' College from 1953 to 1954, where she met Guy Morgan. The couple married in 1955 and went on to have five children. After starting her teaching career in Auckland, she returned to the Cook Islands to work at Nikao Maori School in Rarotonga from 1958 to 1962.

She was a Cook Islands delegate to the fourth South Pacific Commission conference in 1959. In the same year she joined Rarotonga Teachers' Training College as teacher and Women's Warden. A keen tennis and basketball player, she became president of the Rarotonga Basketball Referee's Union. She also served as secretary of the Child Welfare Association.

In the 1961 general elections, she contested the Rarotonga seat and was elected to the Legislative Assembly, becoming the first directly elected woman in the Assembly alongside Poko Ingram. However, she returned to New Zealand the following year and started teaching at Tarawera School. Two years later she moved to Wharepaina Maori School, where she taught for three years. She then moved to Fiji, teaching at Levuka Public School for five years.

The couple returned to New Zealand in 1973, with Morgan teaching at Naike School for a year before moving to Tokoroa. After further teaching jobs at Balmoral Primary School (1975) and Tokoroa East School (1976–1978), she spent four years as a Maori teacher for the South Waikato area. She collected oral histories from her home village and published them in 1986 as Te Ma'ara'anga – Te 'Imene e te Pe'e. The narratives were accompanied by original melodies and can be read or sung. In the same year, she was awarded the Queen's Service Medal.

In 1988 she became director of the Anau Ako Pasifika project, which specialised in creating resources for learning Pacific languages. She received a Fulbright Program study grant in 1990, During the 1990s she wrote and published a series of children's books in Cook Islands Māori, which were translated into Samoan, and two volumes of Cook Islands songs and verse for children. She later wrote a non-fiction work on the experiences of Cook Islands women in New Zealand, titled Cook Islands women pioneers: early experiences in New Zealand = Vainetini kuki airani, which was published in 2001.

After suffering a stroke in August 2007, she died in Waikato Hospital on 15 September 2007. Anau Ako Pasifika established the Teupoko'ina Utanga Morgan Memorial Award to encourage the development of Pacific early childhood education services.
