= Mauke (electorate) =

Electoral division of the Cook Islands

- Constituency for the Parliament of the Cook Islands
- Region: Outer Islands

Current constituency
- Number of members: 1
- Member: Stephen Matapo

Mauke is a Cook Islands electoral division returning one member to the Cook Islands Parliament. Its current representative is Stephen Matapo, who has held the seat since 2022.

The electorate consists of the island of Mauke.

== Members of Parliament for Mauke ==
Unless otherwise stated, all MPs terms began and ended at general elections.

Name	Party	Elected	Left office
Terii Taripo		1961	
Julian Dashwood	Cook Islands Party	1963, 1965	1966
Tupui Henry	Cook Islands Party	1966, 1968, 1972, 1974, 1978, 1983	1983
Vaine Tairea		1983, 1989, 1994	1999
Mapu Taia	Democrat	1999, 2004, 2006	2010
Tai Tura	Cook Islands Party	2010, 2014, 2018	2022
Stephen Matapo	Independent	2022, 2026	Switched party
Stephen Matapo	Cook Islands Party		incumbent

== Election results ==
=== 2026 election ===
2026 Cook Islands general election: Mauke
Party	Candidate	Votes	%	±%
Independence Party	Stephen Matapo^{†}	175	89.3	
Independent	James Vini Beer	21	10.7	
Turnout		196		
Independent hold		Swing		
^{†} incumbent

=== 2006 election ===
Cook Islands general election, 2006: Mauke
Party	Candidate	Votes	%	±%
Democratic	Mapu Taia	115	53.2	
Cook Islands	George Cowan	101	46.8	
Turnout		216	93.9	

=== 2004 election ===
Cook Islands general election, 2004: Mauke
Party	Candidate	Votes	%	±%
Democratic	Mapu Taia	124	61.4	
Cook Islands	George Cowan	87	43.1	
TE	Taratoa Rouru Metuariki	17	8.4	
Turnout		202	83.1	
