= Albert Henry (politician) =

First Premier of the Cook Islands

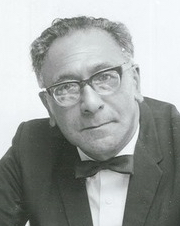
- Henry in 1969

1st Premier of the Cook Islands
- In office 4 August 1965 – 25 July 1978
- Monarch: Elizabeth II
- Deputy: Manea Tamarua; Tiakana Numanga; Apenera Short
- Preceded by: Dick Charles Brown (Leader of Government Business)
- Succeeded by: Tom Davis

Personal details
- Born: 11 June 1906 Tutakimoa, Rarotonga, Cook Islands
- Died: 1 January 1981 (aged 73) Rarotonga, Cook Islands
- Party: Cook Islands Party
- Children: 4
- Profession: Politician

Albert Royle Henry (11 June 1906 – 1 January 1981) was the first Premier of the Cook Islands and the founder and first leader of the Cook Islands Party (CIP). First elected Premier in August 1965, he was unseated in the aftermath of the 1978 election after an electoral petition found he had committed electoral fraud. He was later stripped of his knighthood. In 2023 he was posthumously pardoned.

== Early life ==
Henry was the son of Geoffrey and Metua Henry of Aitutaki, where his father was the head teacher at Araura School. He was born in Rarotonga when his mother was visiting there, and was educated on Aitutaki. At the age of 13 he won a scholarship to New Zealand, but was unable to take it up because he was too young, so his parents instead paid for him to attend St Stephen's College, a boarding school in Auckland, New Zealand. He returned to Rarotonga in 1923 and worked as a teacher, later becoming acting headmaster at Araura school on Aitutaki. He resigned from teaching when the colonial administration decided to cut his pay, then worked for trading company A.B. Donald. In 1936 he founded a newspaper, Te Akatauira ("Morning Star").

In 1942 he moved to Auckland, where he worked as an agricultural worker and a bus driver. In 1945 he became secretary of the Auckland branch of the Cook Islands Progressive Association. He was a leading figure in the CIPA and drew up its programme demanding higher wages, improved shipping, a Cook Islands representative in the New Zealand Parliament, fully elected islands councils, an elected federal islands government, and the abolition of the Resident Commissioner's power to veto legislation. He helped organise the CIPA's industrial campaign in the Cook Islands, and later, its cooperative shipping venture. After the failure of the CIPA he worked at various jobs, including as an interpreter for Cook Islanders in New Zealand courts, while studying economics and philosophy. He later became secretary of the Brown's Bay branch of the New Zealand Labour Party. He also established the Cook Islands – NZ Society, and Polynesian Agencies, a Cooperative trading company.

== Political career ==
Henry returned to the Cook Islands in March 1964 at the invitation of the remnant of the CIPA, the Industrial Union of Workers and the co-operative movement. On his arrival the three groups agreed to unite, leading to the formation of the Cook Islands Party. He was elected party president in July 1964. A three-year residential requirement meant that he could not stand for the legislative Assembly, so his sister Marguerite Story ran in the Te-au-o-Tonga electorate in his place. The Cook Islands Party won 14 seats in the 1965 election, and immediately amended the constitution to reduce the residency requirement to three months. Story resigned, and Henry was elected in the resulting by-election. When the Cook Islands was granted self-government in August 1965, Henry became Premier. Story was then appointed Speaker of the Legislative Assembly.

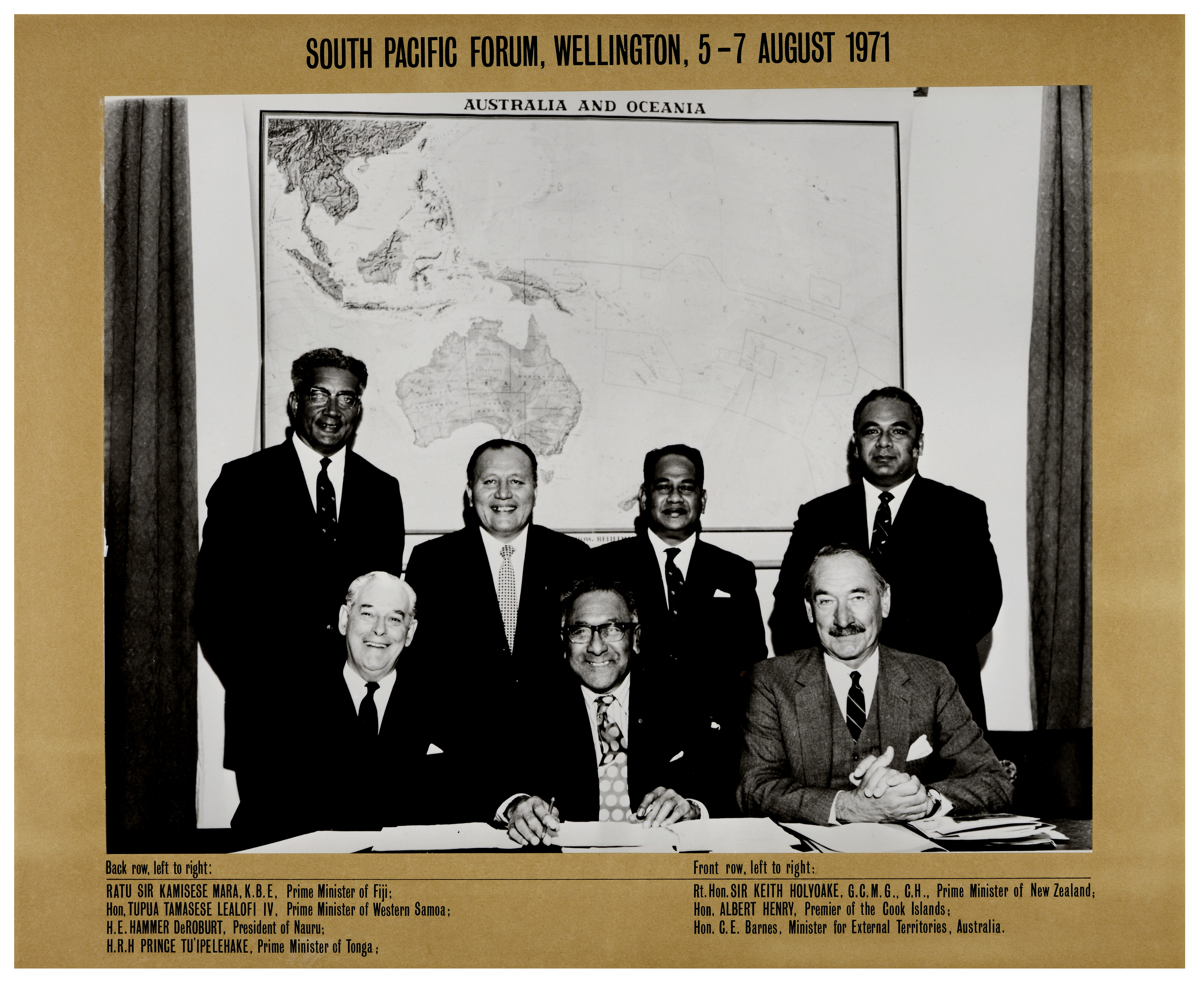
The first meeting of the South Pacific Forum, 5 August 1971. Albert Henry is seated in the centre

The Cook Islands party had proposed the creation of the House of Ariki before self-government, and as Premier Henry oversaw its implementation. He also introduced a universal superannuation scheme to be funded by a new philatelic bureau and opposed French nuclear testing in the Pacific. In 1966 he raised income and sales taxes to reduce dependence on New Zealand. The prosecution of Police Minister Julian Dashwood for corruption, a doctor's strike, and the resignation of two Cabinet Ministers cast a pall on his government, but despite this Henry won the 1968 election, defeating the rival United Cook Islanders 16 seats to 6.

In his second term as Premier Henry made a controversial agreement with the New Zealand government for them to fund an upgrade of Rarotonga International Airport in exchange for control of airspace rights. His government also agreed a plan to revitalise Mauke by developing the citrus industry. A proposal from an American syndicate to lease the island of Aitutaki for a tourist resort and casino fell through, but did result in New Zealand support for greater tourism development. In 1969 he chaired the annual meeting of the South Pacific Commission which saw island countries take control and elect Harry Moors as secretary-general. In 1970 he advocated for the creation of a political forum to operate alongside the Commission and provide a voice for Pacific nations, which led to the creation of the South Pacific Forum.

At the 1972 election Henry faced fresh opposition from the Democratic Party of Tom Davis. Despite this, the CIP managed to win 15 of the 22 seats. During the election campaign Henry accused public servants of "obstructionism", and following the election 44 public servants were fired for supporting the opposition. The decision was overturned by the High Court and the fired public servants reinstated and compensated. Despite streamlining government ministries, his government continued to run large deficits, and continued to be financially dependent on New Zealand. In 1973 he introduced a new national flag for the Cook Islands, consisting of a circle of 15 gold stars on a green ensign. In 1974 he hosted a royal visit from Elizabeth II, during which he was knighted.

In September 1974 Henry suddenly declared that his government was planning a referendum on independence from New Zealand, and that he would call a snap-election to do so. The referendum never happened, as both the government and the opposition supported the status quo, and in the resulting 1974 election the Cook Islands party lost its two-thirds majority, though Henry retained power. During the campaign Henry once again threatened public servants who supported the opposition and threatened to become a dictator. Following the election he announced plans for a constitutional amendment to repatriate the functions of head of state (then performed by New Zealand's High Commissioner), but this was delayed due to his lack of the required two-thirds majority. In 1976 he suffered a heart attack while attending the South Pacific Forum in Rotorua, New Zealand, but said he had no plans to retire. In April 1977 he claimed in the New Zealand press that he had uncovered an opposition plot to overthrow the government by force and assassinate him. Later that year he personally supported Czech-born "cancer therapist" Milan Brych and allowed him to practice in the Cook Islands.

== 1978 election and downfall ==
In January 1978 Henry called elections six months early in an effort to capitalise on a leadership struggle within the opposition Democratic Party. Prior to the elections, three prominent CIP members, William Estall, Raui Pokoati and Joe Williams, left the party. The 1978 election was fiercely contested, and due to restrictions on overseas voting, both parties flew in supporters from New Zealand to vote. The result was a victory for Henry, with the Cook Islands Party regaining its two-thirds majority, and opposition leader Tom Davis losing his seat. The result was challenged in the courts, and in July 1978 Chief Justice Gaven Donne found that Henry had corruptly used government money to fly in voters and secure a majority. The votes of CIP fly-in voters were annulled, resulting in Henry and seven other CIP MP's losing their seats and being replaced by the losing Democratic Party candidates. Henry was ousted from power and Davis was asked to form a government and was sworn in as Prime Minister.

On 16 August 1979, Henry pleaded guilty to two charges of conspiracy and one charge of corruption relating to the use of $337,000 of Cook Islands Government money to fly hundreds of supporters from New Zealand to the Cook Islands in order to vote. He was fined the maximum of $1,400, ordered to pay $2,000 in court costs. A further sentence of three years' probation, imposed solely to bar him from running for political office or participating in political life for that period, was overturned on appeal. Former philatelic bureau director Finbar Kenny subsequently plead guilty to charges under the US Foreign Corrupt Practices Act over the incident.

He was posthumously pardoned on 2 November 2023 by the King's representative on the recommendation of the Cook Islands' Executive Council.

== Sport ==
In 1924 the New Zealand All Blacks team called at Rarotonga en route to their tour of the United Kingdom and France. Wanting a local team to train against, Albert Henry, 17 years old and just returned from New Zealand, was asked to get some boys together. A scratch team was put together and the game was played on the Takamoa Grounds. The game ended in a scoreless tie. Henry was very active in forming rugby clubs, first with Tupapa, later with Arorangi where he was a teacher.

== Personal life ==
Henry married Elizabeth Connal in 1927, when both were schoolteachers in Rarotonga.

He was the father of MP Tepui Henry and the uncle of Geoffrey Henry, who later served as Prime Minister.

== Death ==
Henry died of a heart attack in Rarotonga hospital on 1 January 1981, aged 73. His body was taken around Rarotonga on the back of a pickup truck, and the road was lined with mourners. His grave can be found at the Avarua CICC Church.

== Recognition ==
Henry was appointed a Knight Commander of the Order of the British Empire in the 1974 New Year Honours. His knighthood was stripped in April 1980 after his conviction for electoral fraud.

In 1977, Henry was awarded the Queen Elizabeth II Silver Jubilee Medal.

Following his death a bronze bust was erected at his grave.

== Sources ==
- Kathleen Hancock (1979). Sir Albert Henry, His Life and Times (Methuen: Auckland, ISBN 0-456-02520-0)
