= United Cook Islanders =

The United Cook Islanders was a political party in the Cook Islands. It was established on 16 February 1968 in order to challenge the then-dominant Cook Islands Party and provide a more organised opposition. The party was organised by David Hosking and Taira Rere. Prominent members included former CIP cabinet ministers Manea Tamarua and Mana Strickland. The party did not initially have a formal leader, though Hosking served as "campaign leader"

At the 1968 election, the party ran on a platform of economic development, increased pensions, and good governance. It promised to end the autocratic style of government practiced by the CIP's Albert Henry, end family and party appointments to the public service, and ensure public service neutrality. The party also wished to establish the House of Ariki as a formal upper house, with the ability to advise on and review all legislation. The party stood 18 candidates, but won only six seats, two in Mangaia, two in Atiu, and one each in Rakahanga and Penrhyn. Both Tamarua and Strickland lost their seats.

When parliament sat, the party was recognised as the parliamentary opposition. While the party initially elected Ngatupuna Matepi as leader and Tangata Simiona as deputy leader, it subsequently decided to rotate the positions among all six of its MPs over the next three years.

The party did not run at the 1972 election, with its members joining the Democratic Party.

== Leaders ==
1. Ngatupuna Matepi (1968–1969)
2. Tangaroa Tangaroa (1969–1970)
3. Vainerere Tangatapoto (1970–1971)
