= Dick Rapley =

Member of the Legislative Assembly
- In office 1963–1965
- Preceded by: Les Bailey
- Succeeded by: Seat abolished
- Constituency: European

Personal details
- Born: 1918; New Zealand
- Died: 10 July 1972; Manila, Philippines

Richard Warwick Rapley (1918 – 10 July 1972) was a New Zealand-born businessman and politician in the Cook Islands. He served as a member of the Legislative Assembly between 1963 and 1965.

== Biography ==
Born in New Zealand, Rapley arrived in the Cook Islands to run a citrus plantation at Titikaveka, later representing the Cook Islands in negotiations with New Zealand over fruit prices. He subsequently sold the plantation and started a taxi and hire car business named Ace Taxis, as well as opening the first motel on Rarotonga.

In 1963 he was elected to the Legislative Assembly from the European constituency, replacing Les Bailey. The European constituency was abolished prior to the 1965 elections, in which Rapley unsuccessfully ran in the four-seat Te-au-o-Tonga constituency as an Independent Group candidate, finishing sixth out of nineteen candidates.

In 1969 he became the first chairman of the Cook Islands Tourist Authority. However, the following year he returned to New Zealand for medical treatment, after which he travelled around East Asia for several months. He died in Manila in 1972.
