= 1999 Pukapuka-Nassau by-election =

Election in the Cook Islands

The 1999 Pukapuka-Nassau by-election was a by-election in the Cook Islands electorate of Pukapuka-Nassau. It took place on 29 September 1999.

At the 1999 election, incumbent Inatio Akaruru held the seat by a single vote. The result was challenged by the Democratic Alliance Party and declared invalid. A by-election was held, but was subsequently found to be invalid as a result of discrepancies in voter registrations, precipitating the 2000 Pukapuka-Nassau by-election.
