= Cook Islands Progressive Association =

Political organisation in the Cook Islands

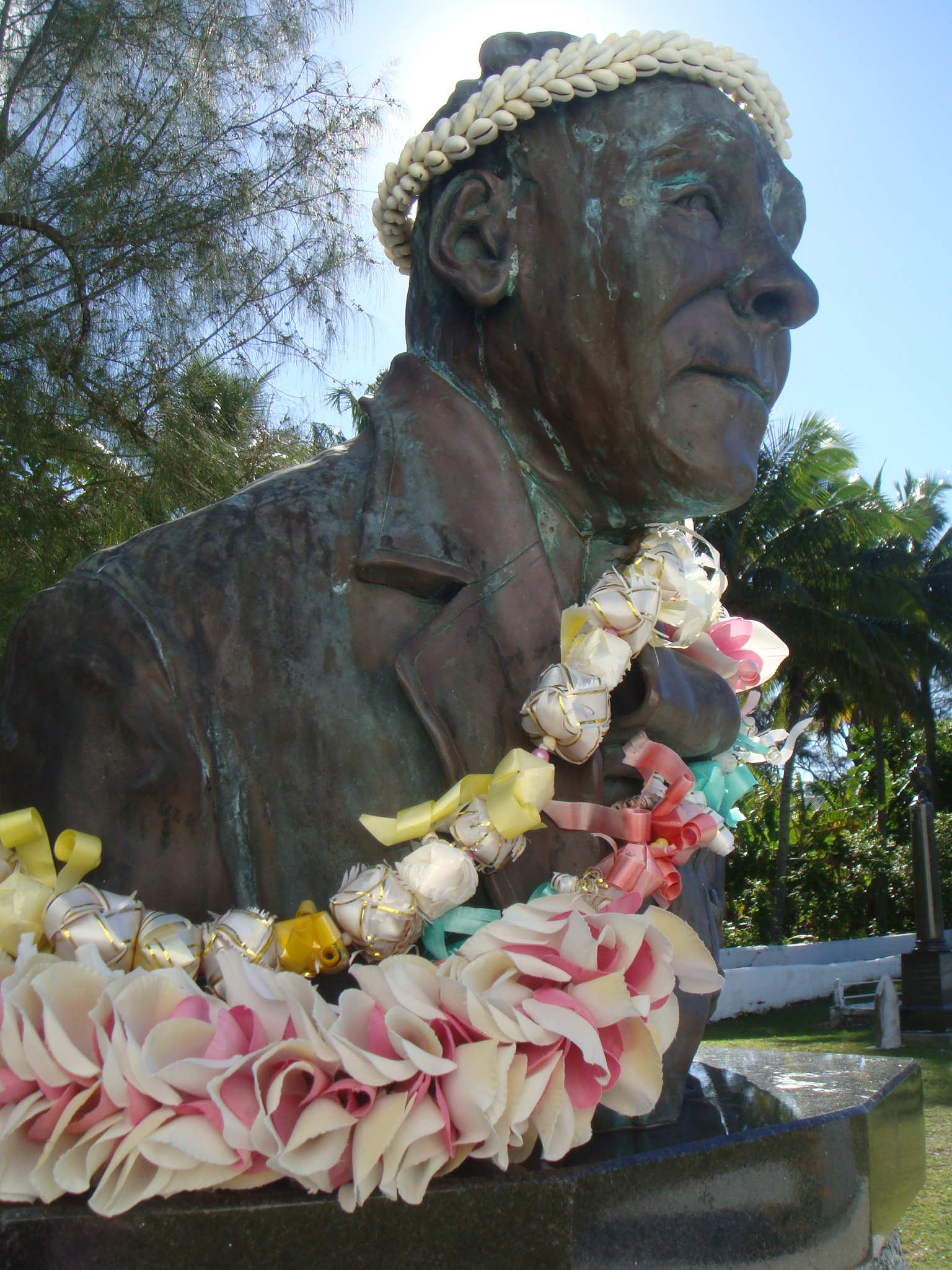
Albert Henry bust at grave, Rarotonga

The Cook Islands Progressive Association (CIPA) was the first indigenous political organisation in the Cook Islands. Initially focused on economic advancement for the islands, it came to advocate for greater self-rule. It was an ancestor of the Cook Islands Party.

== Foundation ==
The Association was founded in November 1944 in Rarotonga and was primarily supported by local planters. Its initial demands were the establishment of co-operative trading stores and for a ship to enable cash-crops to be exported independently of the irregular service provided by the monopoly Union Steam-ship Company.

In April 1945 Cook Island workers returning from working in the phosphate mines on Makatea complained of poor working conditions, low wages, insufficient food and indenture which amounted to virtual blackbirding. Their contracts had been negotiated directly between the Compagnie des Phosphates de l'Océanie and the New Zealand government. A petition to the Resident Commissioner was not forwarded to Wellington, and the issue was taken up in New Zealand by the local Cook Islands community and the Auckland Trades Council, resulting in a government inquiry. The Auckland Cook Islands community subsequently formed an Auckland branch of the Association in October 1945, which in November 1945 elected Albert Henry as its secretary. This branch subsequently became dominant in the Association, and drew up a program demanding higher wages, improved shipping, a Cook Islands representative in the New Zealand Parliament, fully elected islands councils, an elected federal islands government, and the abolition of the Resident Commissioner's power to veto legislation.

== Industrial campaign ==
In January 1946 the CIPA organised a strike for higher wages by Avarua harbour workers a few days before the Union Steamship Company's Maui Pomare arrived in Rarotonga. The strike was successful, and resulted in a significant increase in membership for the CIPA: by May 1946 it claimed 3,000 financial members, roughly half the population. The New Zealand government subsequently formed a government sponsored union, the Cook Islands Workers Union, in an effort to prevent future unrest. In December 1947 a dispute between CIPA and CIWU supporters on Manihiki saw 14 people arrested and held at the local courthouse. At the same time the Maui Pomare was blacklisted by the CIPA over its use of CIWU labour. When two CIPA members were arrested, a large group of protestors marched on the administration building and forced their release. The Pomare cancelled its next visit, and subsequent ships were greeted with pickets. Fearing further strife, in March 1948 the New Zealand government sent a force of New Zealand police to maintain order, and gazetted regulations forbidding strikes. The police remained in place until November, and the CIPA gave up its industrial campaign.

== Post-1948 activities ==
After 1948, the CIPA focused on economic development, acquiring a ship for inter-island transport and establishing a Producer's Cooperative Society. Both ventures subsequently failed.

The CIPA maintained a skeleton existence for the next 14 years. It contested the 1956 Cook Islands general election, winning three of the six Maori seats on Rarotonga. In 1963, as self-government approached, it began talks with the Industrial Union of Workers and the co-operative movement on the formation of a new political group. When Albert Henry returned to the Cook Islands in March 1964, the three groups agreed to unite, leading to the formation of the Cook Islands Party.
