= United Political Party =

Defunct political party in the Cook Islands

The United Political Party was a political party in the Cook Islands. It was founded shortly before the 1965 election and was led by the then-Leader of Government Business, Dick Charles Brown. It ran 16 candidates, 4 of which were elected; Brown himself lost his seat. The party fell apart after the election, though some members went on to participate in the United Cook Islanders.
