= 1965 Cook Islands general election =

- 20 April 1965
- All 22 seats in the Legislative Assembly; 13 seats needed for a majority
Party	Leader	Vote %	Seats
Cook Islands	Albert Henry	52.25	14
United Political Party	Dick Charles Brown	19.72	4
Independent Group		16.71	4
This lists parties that won seats. See the complete results below.
Leader of Government Business before	Leader of Government Business after
Dick Charles Brown; United Political Party	Manea Tamarua; Cook Islands

General elections were held in the Cook Islands on 20 April 1965 to elect 22 MPs to the Cook Islands Legislative Assembly. The elections were won by the Cook Islands Party and saw Albert Henry become the Cook Islands' first Premier.

== Background ==
The holding of an election was necessary to elect members to approve the proposed constitution. If approved, the new constitution would institute self-government for the Cook Islands.

Because the election had the potential to result in removing the Cook Islands from the United Nations list of non-self-governing territories, the election was observed by representatives of the UN.

The Cook Islands Amendment Act contained a clause limiting candidacy for the elections to people who had lived in the Cook Islands for at least three years before the election. This barred Albert Henry from running, as he had only lived in the Cook Island for a year preceding the vote.

== Campaign ==
A total of 66 candidates contested the 22 seats, 19 from the Cook Islands Party, 16 from the United Political Party (led by Leader of Government business Dick Charles Brown), 12 from the Independent Group, 7 from the Labour Party, and 12 independents. also fielding candidates. Two seats had only one candidate – Tangaroa Tangaroa in Penrhyn and Pupuke Robati in Rakahanga – both of whom were returned unopposed

== Results ==
Leader of Government business Brown, Agriculture Minister Napa Tauei Napa and Speaker Teariki Tuavera were amongst the nine incumbents that lost their seats.

Party	Votes	%	Seats
Cook Islands Party	9,511	52.25	14
United Political Party	3,590	19.72	4
Independent Group	3,042	16.71	4
Labour Party	963	5.29	0
Independents	1,098	6.03	0
Total	18,204	100.00	22
Valid votes	6,839	99.03	
Invalid/blank votes	67	0.97	
Total votes	6,906	100.00	
Registered voters/turnout	7,353	93.92	
Source: Stone

=== By electorate ===
Constituency	Candidate	Party	Votes
Aitutaki–Manuae	William Estall	Independent Group	534
Aitutaki–Manuae	Matai Simiona	Independent Group	438
Aitutaki–Manuae	Geoffrey Henry	Independent Group	403
Aitutaki–Manuae	Joseph Williams	Independent	360
Aitutaki–Manuae	Ngaa Upu	Cook Islands	352
Aitutaki–Manuae	Maria Henderson	Cook Islands	325
Aitutaki–Manuae	Tukua Cameron	Cook Islands	313
Aitutaki–Manuae	Tanga Mitiau Dick	Independent	69
Aitutaki–Manuae	Benioni Joseph	Independent	55
Atiu	Tangata Simiona	United Political Party	293
Atiu	Mariri Paratainga	Cook Islands	186
Atiu	Vainerere Tangatapoto	United Political Party	143
Atiu	Michael Toki	Independent Group	127
Atiu	Mataio Kea	Independent	88
Atiu	Tutai Pakari Vaine	Cook Islands	45
Mangaia	Ngatupuna Matepi	United Political Party	558
Mangaia	Pokino Aberahama	United Political Party	554
Mangaia	Maarateina Atatoa	Cook Islands	153
Mangaia	Edwin Gold	Independent	32
Manihiki	Nato Temu	Cook Islands	133
Manihiki	Glassie Strickland Jr.	Independent Group	46
Manihiki	Tuatai Tupou	Independent	26
Manihiki	Adamu Toka	Independent	17
Manihiki	Tihau Napara	Independent	9
Mauke	Julian Dashwood	Cook Islands	198
Mauke	Ngaoire Torea	United Political Party	47
Mitiaro	Raui Pokoati	Cook Islands	75
Mitiaro	Tiki Tetava	United Political Party	24
Penrhyn	Tangaroa Tangaroa	United Political Party	Unopposed
Puaikura	Taru Moana	Cook Islands	476
Puaikura	Pera Maurangi	Cook Islands	459
Puaikura	Napa Tauei Napa	United Political Party	271
Puaikura	Rere Wichman	Labour	185
Puaikura	George Robati	Independent	56
Pukapuka–Nassau	John Tariau	Cook Islands	173
Pukapuka–Nassau	Mangere Maro	Independent	113
Pukapuka–Nassau	Arona Tariau	United Political Party	93
Rakahanga	Pupuke Robati	Independent Group	Unopposed
Takitumu	Apenera Short	Cook Islands	532
Takitumu	Tiakana Numanga	Cook Islands	501
Takitumu	Samuela Samuela	Cook Islands	487
Takitumu	Teariki Tuavera	United Political Party	251
Takitumu	Areora Ira	United Political Party	181
Takitumu	David Hosking	Independent Group	155
Takitumu	Tupai Ama	Labour	123
Takitumu	Manea Turepu	Independent Group	104
Takitumu	William Cowan	Labour	61
Te-au-o-Tonga	Manea Tamarua	Cook Islands	1,405
Te-au-o-Tonga	Mana Strickland	Cook Islands	1,321
Te-au-o-Tonga	Marguerite Story	Cook Islands	1,225
Te-au-o-Tonga	Teaukura Roi	Cook Islands	1,152
Te-au-o-Tonga	Dick Charles Brown	United Political Party	535
Te-au-o-Tonga	R. W. Rapley	Independent Group	472
Te-au-o-Tonga	S. M. Sadaraka	Independent Group	456
Te-au-o-Tonga	Stuart Kingan	Independent	240
Te-au-o-Tonga	John Numa	Labour	230
Te-au-o-Tonga	Tetauru Jim Moerua	United Political Party	213
Te-au-o-Tonga	Jack Best	Labour	188
Te-au-o-Tonga	Mary Paitai	Independent Group	175
Te-au-o-Tonga	Koa Ioaba	United Political Party	159
Te-au-o-Tonga	Paiere Mokoroa	United Political Party	149
Te-au-o-Tonga	Anthony Utanga	Independent Group	132
Te-au-o-Tonga	Araiti Tupuariki	United Political Party	119
Te-au-o-Tonga	John Dugall Taripo	Labour	94
Te-au-o-Tonga	Tongia Unuia	Labour	82
Te-au-o-Tonga	Amana Upu Pere	Independent	33
Source: Cook Islands Gazette, Stone, Pacific Islands Monthly

== Aftermath ==
The newly elected Assembly met for the first time on 10 May. With Henry still ineligible for election, Manea Tamarua was elected Leader of Government Business. He subsequently announced appointed Julian Dashwood, Tiakana Numanga, Apenera Short, Marguerite Story and Mana Strickland to the Executive Council.

On 11 May Cook Islands Party MPs attempted to amend the Cook Islands Amendment Act to reduce the residency requirement and allow Henry to become an MP. The opposition independents walked out of the legislature, meaning it was not quorate due to the absence of two Cook Islands Party MPs. However, they returned the following day and an amendment to reduce the residency requirement to three months (providing the candidate had previously lived in the Cook Islands for at least a year) was passed. Henry's sister Marguerite Story subsequently resigned from the Assembly to allow him to contest the by-election for Te-au-o-Tonga on 9 July. Henry was challenged by Dick Charles Brown, winning by 1,353 votes to 523.

The Legislative Assembly later approved the constitution on 26 July by 20 votes to two. The two 'no' votes came from Pupuke Robati (who claimed that residents of Rakahanga did not wish for the Cook Islands to become self-governing) and Tangaroa Tangaroa (who claimed that Penrhyn wished to become part of New Zealand). The Cook Islands became self-governing on 4 August 1965 when Henry was sworn in as the first Premier. Henry formed a cabinet with Dashwood, Numanga, Short, Strickland and Tamarua as ministers. On the same day as Henry was sworn in, Marguerite Story was elected unopposed as the Assembly's first Speaker.

Henry cabinet
Portfolio	Member
Premier	Albert Henry
Aviation, Commerce, Economic Development, Emigration, Employment, External Affairs, Finance, Immigration, Justice, Labour, Tourism, Trade	Albert Henry
Agriculture, Health	Manea Tamarua
Cooperatives	Apenera Short
Education	Mana Strickland
Police, Social Development	Julian Dashwood
Public Works, Survey	Tiakana Numanga
Source: Pacific Islands Monthly

Although Henry held numerous portfolios, the other members of the cabinet were Associate Ministers for several of his areas of responsibility; Dashwood was Associate Minister for the Post Office, Hotel and Printing Office, Numanga was Associate Minister of Labour, Short was Associate Minister of Economic Development, Strickland was Associate Minister for Finance, Aviation, Shipping and Immigration, Tamarua was Associate Minister of Economic Development, Finance and Justice.

In June 1966 Dashwood was convicted of attempting to obtain a bribe and was removed from the Assembly and cabinet. He was also struck off the voter roll and was unable to contest the subsequent by-election. Albert Henry's nephew Tupui Henry was elected in the by-election, and was appointed to the cabinet as Minister of Internal Affairs.
