= Niki Rattle =

Cook Islands politician (born 1951)

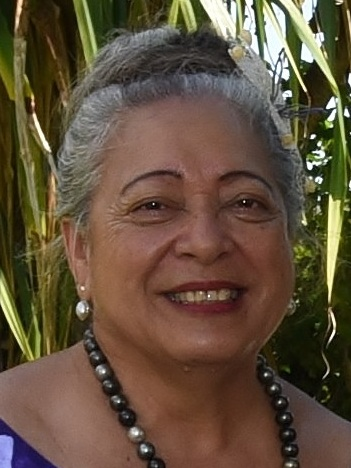

10th Speaker of the Cook Islands Parliament
- In office 22 May 2012 – 15 February 2021
- Preceded by: Geoffrey Henry
- Succeeded by: Tai Tura

Personal details
- Born: 1951
- Political party: Appointed
- Occupation: Registered Nurse

Niki Rattle (born 1951) was Speaker of the Cook Islands Parliament from 22 May 2012 to 15 February 2021.

Rattle was born in Manihiki. She is a Registered Nurse. Before her appointment she served as Secretary of the Cook Islands Red Cross for 18 years. She was appointed Speaker by Prime Minister Henry Puna on 22 May 2012.

== Career ==
Her appointment was criticised by the opposition, who felt that an elected MP should have filled the position. She was reappointed Speaker in 2014. She is in charge for ensuring the functions of parliament in accordance with the principals of the constitution, and the standing orders and procedures of parliament. Rattle stands for gender equality in parliament, as she was a President of the National Council of Women, President of the Women’s Counselling Centre before her appointment as a Speaker of Parliament. Rattle participated in the first Women's Practice Parliament in the Cook Islands in 2015 and again in 2017, and she introduced the roles and responsibilities of being a Member of Parliament to the women. She is actively engaged in the work of the Commonwealth Women Parliamentarians Group.

On 15 February 2021 Rattle resigned as Speaker, saying that it was important that office-holders be "refreshed from time to time". She was succeeded as Speaker by Tai Tura.

In January 2022 she was appointed Ombudsman.
