= Pupuke Robati =

Cook Islands politician

Sir Pupuke Robati KBE

6th Speaker of the Cook Islands Parliament
- In office 24 July 2001 – 15 December 2004
- Monarch: Elizabeth II
- Queen's Representative: Frederick Tutu Goodwin
- Preceded by: Harmon Pou
- Succeeded by: Norman George

5th Prime Minister of the Cook Islands
- In office 29 July 1987 – 1 February 1989
- Monarch: Elizabeth II
- Deputy: Terepai Maoate
- Queen's Representative: Sir Tangaroa Tangaroa
- Preceded by: Tom Davis
- Succeeded by: Geoffrey Henry

4th Deputy Prime Minister of the Cook Islands
- In office 25 July 1978 – 13 April 1983
- Prime Minister: Tom Davis
- Preceded by: Apenera Short
- Succeeded by: Geoffrey Henry

Member of the Cook Islands Parliament for Rakahanga
- In office 20 April 1965 – 7 September 2004
- Preceded by: None (Seat established)
- Succeeded by: Piho Rua

Personal details
- Born: 9 April 1925
- Died: 26 April 2009 (aged 84) Auckland, New Zealand
- Resting place: Rakahanga
- Party: Democratic Party
- Education: Fiji School of Medicine

Sir Pupuke Robati, KBE (9 April 1925 – 26 April 2009) was a Cook Island politician. He served as Prime Minister of the Cook Islands from 29 July 1987 to 1 February 1989.

Robati was from the island of Rakahanga. He completed his primary and secondary schooling in Manihiki and Rarotonga. He studied medicine at the Fiji School of Medicine and graduated as a surgeon in 1948. On returning to the Cook Islands, he worked in Rarotonga, Mangaia, and Atiu, eventually rising to be director of public health. In 1966, he received training from the Faculty of Medicine of the University of Otago in New Zealand and graduated with a Diploma of Public Health.

== Political career ==
Robati was elected to the Legislative Assembly of the Cook Islands in the 1965 election as an independent representing the district of Rakahanga. He was re-elected in the 1968 election, and in 1972 he joined the newly created Democratic Party. He was re-elected in eight more general elections as a candidate for the Democratic Party.

Beginning in 1978, Robati was the Deputy Premier in the Cabinet of Premier Tom Davis. On 29 July 1987, he succeeded Davis as prime minister after Davis failed three times to pass a budget through Parliament. During his 18 months as prime minister, the Parliament of the Cook Islands enacted a constitutional amendment that added a preamble to the constitution which recognised the "heritage of Christian principles" in the Cook Islands and declared that the people of the Cook Islands "remember to keep holy the Sabbath Day, being the day of the week, which, according to a person's belief and conscience, is the Sabbath of the Lord."

The defeat of the Democratic Party in the election of 1989 ended Robati's tenure as prime minister. From 2001 to 2004, he was the Speaker of the Cook Islands Parliament. In the 2004 election, Robati lost his seat to the independent candidate Piho Rua. The election was later subject to an unsuccessful electoral petition. This defeat marked the end of its political career. At the time of his defeat, he was the longest serving Cook Islands MP.

Robati was a boxer, and in 1944 was the Cook Islands' champion bantamweight boxer. He was the chair of the Cook Islands' federation of amateur boxing for more than 30 years.

Robati died in Auckland, New Zealand. He was buried on Rakahanga.

== Recognition ==
In 1977, Robati was awarded the Queen Elizabeth II Silver Jubilee Medal. He was appointed an Officer of the Order of the British Empire in the 1991 New Year Honours. In 2001, he was promoted to Knight Commander of the Order of the British Empire by Queen Elizabeth II.
