= Marguerite Story =

Marguerite Nora Eikura Kitimira Story, OBE (née Henry; 11 May 1922 – 25 September 2009), was the Speaker of the Legislative Assembly of the Cook Islands from 1965 to 1979. She was the first female cabinet member in the Cook Islands and the first woman in the Commonwealth to become speaker of a national parliament.

== Biography ==
Story was born in Mangaia to Geoffrey (Tiavare) Tetaura Henry and Metua Grace Kamire. She was a sister to Albert Henry, the first Premier of the Cook Islands and the founder of the Cook Islands Party (CIP). She married Alfred Story and resided for most of her life in Rarotonga.

In the 1965 Cook Islands election, Albert Henry was not able to stand for parliament because he had not resided in the Cook Islands for the requisite three years, even though he was the leader of the CIP, which was the largest party in the Cook Islands. Story ran as a "placeholder" for her brother and was elected in the Te-au-o-Tonga constituency, one of the Rarotonga ridings. After the election, the government—which as expected was controlled by Henry's CIP—reduced the residency requirements for a member of the Legislative Assembly from three years to three months. Story resigned her seat to allow her brother to run in a by-election. Henry won the by-election for the Te-au-o-Tonga seat and in return the government elected Story as the Speaker of the Legislative Assembly, a position she held until 1979. During the brief period of time, Story was a member of the Legislative Assembly in 1965, she served in the Cabinet and was the first female member of the Cabinet in the Cook Islands.

In the 1980s, Story was a community officer for the Ministry of Social Development. She was involved in Girl Guides and was the founder of the Nikao Youth Club and the Cook Islands Women's Federation. She was also a netball umpire and coach.

In 1977, Story was awarded the Queen Elizabeth II Silver Jubilee Medal. She was appointed an Officer of the Order of the British Empire, for public and community service in the Cook Islands, in the 1984 New Year Honours.

Story died at the Rarotonga Hospital in Avarua and was buried in Aitutaki. Story and her husband were the parents of six children together, in addition to five children from previous relationships.
