= Inatio Akaruru =

Cook Islands politician (1937–2014)

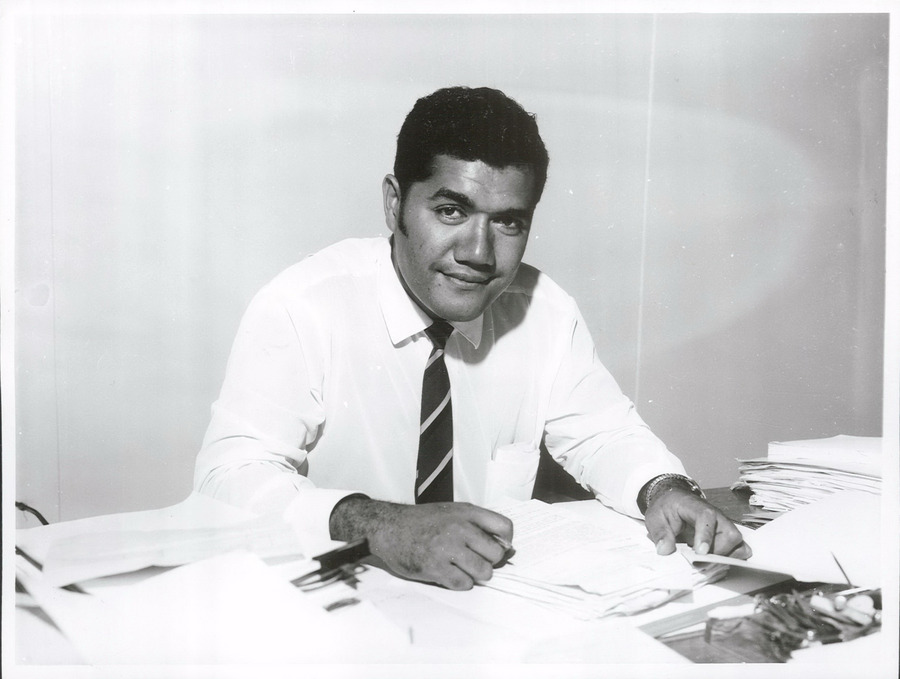
Inatio Akaruru in 1969

Inatio Akaruru CBE (31 March 1937 – 31 January 2014) was a Cook Islands politician, cabinet minister and Deputy Prime Minister. He was a member of the Cook Islands Party.

Akaruru was born on Pukapuka. He worked as a public servant before being elected as MP for Pukapuka at the 1968 election. Following the 1972 election he was made Minister of Health in the government of Albert Henry. A cabinet reshuffle in 1973 saw him given responsiblity for public works, electrical and harbour development. The change of government at the 1978 election saw him leave cabinet, but he was reappointed to the same portfolios after the March 1983 election. He again lost his position briefly following the November 1983 election, but the subsequent formation of a coalition government saw him reappointed in August 1984. He later became Deputy Prime Minister to Geoffrey Henry.

At the 1999 election Akaruru held the Pukapuka-Nassau seat by a single vote. The result was challenged by the Democratic Alliance Party and declared invalid. A by-election in September 1999 was also subsequently invalidated. Akaruru contested the resulting 2000 Pukapuka-Nassau by-election and was defeated.

In 1977, Akaruru was awarded the Queen Elizabeth II Silver Jubilee Medal. He was appointed a Commander of the Order of the British Empire in the 1992 New Year Honours.

Akaruru was interested in bowls and was President of the Cook Islands Bowling Association from 1984 to 2006. He represented the Cook Islands in Bowls at the 1990 Auckland and 2002 Manchester Commonwealth Games.

In 2020 the Cook Islands Bowls Association named a bowling green after him.
