= Speaker of the Cook Islands Parliament =

Presiding officer of the Cook Islands Parliament

- Flag of the Cook Islands
- Incumbent; Tai Tura since 22 March 2021
- Inaugural holder: Marguerite Story
- Formation: 1965

The Speaker of the Cook Islands Parliament is the presiding officer of the Cook Islands Parliament. The speaker manages the House in accordance with its standing orders and according to the traditions of the Westminster system.

The current Speaker is Tai Tura.

== Election ==
The Speaker is elected by the House at the beginning of a parliamentary term according to the provisions of the Cook Islands Constitution and the Standing Orders. Unlike other Westminster systems the Speaker does not have to be a Member of Parliament, though they must be qualified to be one. By law they may not be a Cabinet Minister.

The Constitution requires that Parliament elect the person nominated by the Prime Minister, however the parliament's Standing Orders include a process for contested elections.

Following their election the Speaker must present themselves to the Queen's Representative to swear an oath of allegiance and lay claim to the privileges of the House.

The Speaker holds office until they cease to be an MP (or, in the case of a Speaker who is not an MP, cease to be qualified to be one), become a Minister, are removed by a vote of the House, or Parliament is dissolved.

== Deputy Speaker ==
The Speaker is assisted by a Deputy Speaker, elected by Parliament. The current Deputy Speaker is Tuakeu Tangatapoto.

== Holders of the office ==
Eight people have held the office of Speaker since the creation of Parliament. A full list of speakers is below.

	Name	Took office	Left office	Speaker's party	Governing party
1	Marguerite Story	1965	1979	Unknown	Cook Islands Party
2	David Marama Hosking	1979	1988	Unknown	Mixed
3	Raututi Taringa	1989	1999	Unknown	Cook Islands Party
4	Ngereteina Puna	1999	2001	Unknown	Democratic Party
5	Harmon Pou	24 July 2001	24 July 2001	Unknown	Democratic Party
6	Sir Pupuke Robati	24 July 2001	15 December 2004	Democratic Party	Democratic Party
7	Norman George	15 December 2004	2005	Unelected	Democratic Party
	Norman George, continued	2005	2006	Unelected	Cook Islands First Party
8	Mapu Taia	2006	2010	Democratic Party	Democratic Party
9	Sir Geoffrey Henry	18 February 2011	9 May 2012	Cook Islands Party	Cook Islands Party
10	Niki Rattle	22 May 2012	15 February 2021	Unelected	Cook Islands Party
11	Tai Tura	22 March 2021		Cook Islands Party	Cook Islands Party
