= Apenera Short =

Cook Islands politician

Sir Apenera Pera Short KBE

Queen's Representative to the Cook Islands
- In office 19 December 1990 – 14 November 2000
- Monarch: Elizabeth II
- Prime Minister: Geoffrey Henry; Joe Williams
- Preceded by: Sir Tangaroa Tangaroa
- Succeeded by: Laurence Greig

Deputy Premier of the Cook Islands
- In office 1974–1978 Serving with Tiakana Numanga
- Premier: Albert Henry
- Preceded by: Manea Tamarua (1967)
- Succeeded by: Pupuke Robati

Personal details
- Born: 4 February 1916 Rarotonga, Cook Islands
- Died: 15 June 2011 (aged 95) Rarotonga, Cook Islands
- Party: Cook Islands Party
- Spouse: Maui Timata i te Rui Cowan
- Children: 14
- Occupation: Teacher, Politician

Sir Apenera Pera Short KBE (4 February 1916 – 15 June 2011) was a Cook Islands politician and from 1990 to 2000 was the Queen's Representative in the Cook Islands.

Short was born on Rarotonga. He was a school teacher in Ngatangiia at from 1951 to 1956 was a teacher at Tereora College in Avarua. In 1939, he married Maui Timata i te Rui Cowan; the couple had 14 children, including two sets of twins.

In the 1965 Cook Islands election, Short was elected as a member of the Cook Islands Legislative Assembly and joined the Cabinet of the ruling Cook Islands Party as a Minister of the Crown and Deputy Premier. Short held this position until 1978.

On 19 December 1990, Short was appointed to succeed Sir Tangaroa Tangaroa as the Queen's Representative. Short held this position until 14 December 2000. He was succeeded by Lawrence Greig, who held the position in an acting capacity until Frederick Tutu Goodwin was appointed in 2001.

== Honours ==
Short was appointed a Knight Commander of the Order of the British Empire (KBE) by Queen Elizabeth II in 1995.

In March 1997 he was appointed a commander of the Order of Tahiti Nui.

== Death ==
Short died at his home in Muri Beach, Rarotonga, aged 95.
