= Tangaroa Tangaroa =

Member of Parliament and Queen's Representative (1921–2009)

Sir Tangaroa Tangaroa MBE
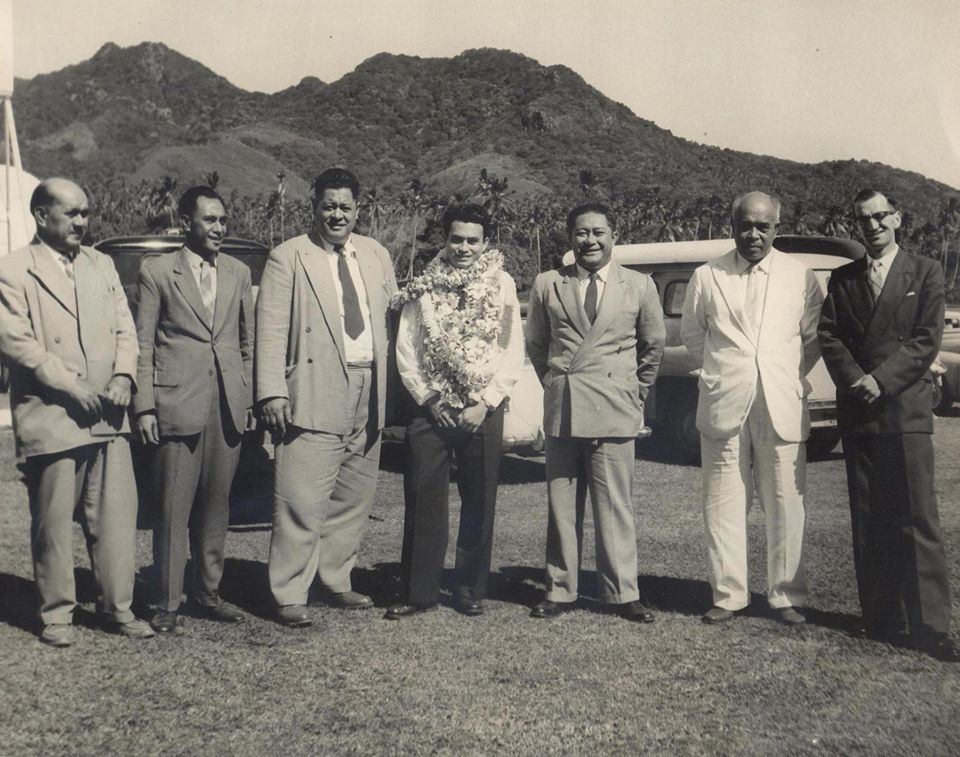

Queen’s Representative to the Cook Islands
- In office 19 December 1984 – 19 December 1990
- Monarch: Elizabeth II
- Prime Minister: Tom Davis; Pupuke Robati; Geoffrey Henry
- Preceded by: Graham Speight (Acting)
- Succeeded by: Apenera Short

Personal details
- Born: 6 May 1921 Penrhyn, Cook Islands
- Died: 23 May 2009 (aged 88) New Zealand

Sir Tangaroa Tangaroa MBE (6 May 1921 – 23 May 2009) was a Cook Islands politician. Born as the only child to Akaruke and Puna, he helped raise his wife's children.

He started his professional life as a government radio operator (1939–1954). In 1955 he became a shipping clerk which he remained until 1963

Tangaroa was elected in 1958 to the country's first Legislative Assembly, and subsequently served as member for Penrhyn in the Parliament of the Cook Islands until 1983. In 1969 to 1970, he was the leader of the now-defunct United Cook Islanders party.

Tangaroa later became a member of the Democratic Party, and he served in Democratic Party Cabinets in the late 1970s.

In 1985, he was the first Cook Islander to be appointed Queen's Representative. He held the position until 1990, when he was succeeded by Apenera Short.

The Cook Islands government website points out that in 2003 he "has the distinction of being the only Cook Islander to have been knighted by Queen Elizabeth II at Buckingham Palace". In 1977, he was awarded the Queen Elizabeth II Silver Jubilee Medal, and in 1990 he received the New Zealand 1990 Commemoration Medal.

Tangaroa died in New Zealand in late May 2009. He received a state funeral on Rarotonga.
