= Cook Islands Party =

- Abbreviation: CIP
- Leader: Mark Brown
- Founder: Albert Henry
- Founded: 15 June 1964
- Preceded by: Cook Islands Progressive Association
- Ideology: Cook Islands Māori nationalism
- Political position: Centre to centre-right
- Seats in the Cook Islands Parliament: 13 / 24

Party flag

Website
- cookislandsparty.com

The Cook Islands Party is a nationalist political party in the Cook Islands. It was the first political party founded in the Cook Islands, and one of the two major parties of the islands' politics since 1965.

From 1999 until 2005, it sometimes participated in coalition governments. In the 2006 elections, it came runner-up and largest opposition party in the islands. The party won both the 2010 and 2014 elections and currently forms the government. As a result of the 2018 elections, it is the second largest party in the Cook Islands Parliament. The leader of the party is the Prime Minister Mark Brown.

== History ==
The Cook Islands Party was established on 15 June 1964 by Albert Henry, a former leader of the Cook Islands Progressive Association, who had agitated for greater self-rule in the 1940s. The party was founded on a platform of economic development, maintaining ties with New Zealand, the protection of traditional Cook Islands culture and increased recognition of traditional titles. Within a month of foundation, the party had gained over 2,000 members on Rarotonga.

Prior to independence, the party campaigned for the three-year residential qualification for candidates to the Legislative Assembly to be reduced, in order to allow Henry, who had returned to the Cook Islands from New Zealand in March 1964, to stand. They were unsuccessful, so Henry was replaced as a candidate in the 1965 election by his sister Marguerite Story. The party won a strong majority of 14 seats, which they used to amend the constitution to reduce the residency requirement. Following the passage of the necessary legislation by the New Zealand Parliament, Story resigned. Henry was elected in the consequent by-election and became the first Prime Minister of the Cook Islands.

The party dominated Islands politics for the next decade, but lost power at the 1978 election after it was discovered to have engaged in widespread electoral fraud. Albert Henry resigned as party leader and was replaced by his cousin Geoffrey Henry. He was subsequently convicted of conspiracy and misuse of public money and stripped of his knighthood.

The party spent the next decade in opposition, then held power again between 1989 and 1999. From 1999 until 2005 it sometimes participated in coalition governments. It won 10 seats in the 1999 election and 9 seats in the 2004 election. In 2006 it replaced its long-time leader, Geoffrey Henry, with Henry Puna, but Puna was defeated in the parliamentary election several months later along with the deputy leader. While he remained the party's leader, the Parliamentary Leader of the Opposition was Tom Marsters.

At the 26 September 2006 election, the party won 45.3% of the popular vote and 7 out of 24 seats, making it the largest opposition party. In July 2010, following a dispute about candidate selection, Avatiu/Ruatonga MP Albert (Peto) Nicholas left the party and founded the Party Tumu. The breakaway party attracted the support of influential CIP backer Tupui Ariki Henry, son of CIP founder and former prime minister Albert Henry.

CIP won the 2010 and 2014 elections, leading to two terms as prime minister for Henry Puna. In the 2018 election they won one seat less than the Democratic Party but were able to form a coalition government. They won 12 seats in the 2022 election and formed a coalition government with three independents. The party won an outright majority of 13 seats in the 2026 election.

== Electoral performance ==
=== Legislative Assembly ===
Election	Votes	%	Seats	+/–	Rank	Government
1965	9,511	52,25	14 / 22	New	▲1st	Majority
1968	12,202	64.45	16 / 22	▲2	1st	Majority
1972			15 / 22	▼1	1st	Majority
1974			14 / 22	▼1	1st	Majority
1978			15 / 22	▲1	1st	Majority
March 1983		50.1	13 / 24	▼2	1st	Majority
Nov 1983		48.3	11 / 24	▼2	▼2nd	Opposition
1989			12 / 24	▲1	▲1st	Minority
1994		45.3	20 / 25	▲8	▲1st	Supermajority
1999			11 / 25	▼9	1st	Minority
2004	3,647	43.9	9 / 24	▼2	▼2nd	Opposition
2006	3,846	45.3	7 / 24	▼2	2nd	Opposition
2010	3,753	44.58	16 / 24	▲9	▲1st	Majority
2014	3,498	41.81	12 / 24	▼4	1st	Minority
2018	3,654	42.30	10 / 24	▼2	1st	Minority
2022	3,890	44.07	12 / 24	▲2	1st	Minority
2026	4,175	45.32	13 / 24	▲1	1st	Majority

== Officeholders ==
=== List of leaders ===
No.	Name	Term of office	
1	Albert Henry	1964	1 January 1981
Position vacant (1 January – August 1981) (Note: Although Albert Henry had moved away from parliamentary politics, he still retained the leadership of the party until his death on 1 January 1983. Geoffrey Henry, who had been serving as a de facto leader of the party, was not sworn in formally until a special party conference was held in August 1983. This has led to some sources stating that Geoffrey Henry became leader of the party in 1979. The party itself has also stated that Albert Henry ceased being leader in 1978, with Geoffrey Henry becoming leader in 1978.)
2	Geoffrey Henry	August 1981	31 August 2006
3	Henry Puna	September 2006	September 2020
4	Mark Brown	September 2020	incumbent

=== List of deputy leaders ===
Name	Term of office		Leader
Tupui Henry	c. August 1981	c. July 1983	Henry
Tupou Faireka	September 2006	?	Puna
Mark Brown	fl.18 November 2010		Puna
Position vacant (c. 22 November 2010 – ?) (Note: On 18 November 2010, Mark Brown was referred to as the party's deputy by Radio New Zealand. However, four days later, Radio New Zealand stated that the deputy leader position was vacant, with several, including Brown, fighting for the position.)			Puna
Teariki Heather	fl.September 2015		Puna
Mark Brown	fl.December 2018 – September 2020		Puna
