= 16th Cook Islands Parliament =

2014 term

The 16th Cook Islands Parliament is the previous term of the Parliament of the Cook Islands. Its composition was determined by the 2014 elections on 9 July 2014.

Due to an election-night tie the seat of Mitiaro was initially left vacant. The tie was later resolved by a judicial recount, and Tangata Vavia was declared elected.

The Parliament sat for the first time on 8 October 2014.

The Speaker of the 16th Parliament was Niki Rattle. The Deputy Speaker was Rose Toki-Brown.

== Members ==
=== Initial MPs ===
Name	Party	Electorate	Term
George Angene	OCI	Tupapa/Maraerenga	Second
James Beer	DP	Murienua	First
Teina Bishop	OCI	Arutanga/Nikaupara/Reureu	Fifth
Mark Brown	CIP	Takuvaine/Tutakimoa	Second
Nandi Glassie	CIP	Tengatangi/Areora/Ngatiarua	Third
Toka Hagai	CIP	Rakahanga	First
Teariki Heather	CIP	Akaoa	Fourth
William (Smiley) Heather	DP	Ruaau	First
Mona Ioane	CIP	Vaipae/Tautu	Second
Toanui Isamaela	CIP	Amuri/Ureia	Second
Willie John	CIP	Penrhyn	First
Tekii Lazaro	CIP	Pukapuka-Nassau	Second
Jim Marurai	DP	Ivirua	Sixth
Tetangi Matapo	DP	Tamarua	Second
Ngamau Munokoa	DP	Nikao/Panama	Sixth
Selina Napa	DP	Titikaveka	Second
Albert Nicholas	DP	Avatiu/Ruatonga	First
Henry Puna	CIP	Manihiki	Third
Rose Toki-Brown	CIP	Teenui-Mapumai	First
Tamaiva Tuavera	DP	Ngatangiia	First
Tai Tura	CIP	Mauke	Second
Kiriau Turepu	CIP	Matavera	Second
Wesley Kareroa	DP	Oneroa	First

=== New members ===
Name	Party	Electorate	Term
Tangata Vavia	DP	Mitiaro	Sixth
Pumati Israela	OCI	Arutanga-Reureu-Nikaupara	First

=== Summary of changes ===
- Tangata Vavia was elected to the seat of Mitiaro in December 2014 following a judicial recount.
- On 15 March 2015 Albert Nicholas switched his support to the government in exchange for a Ministerial position.
- Mona Ioane was elected to the seat of Vaipae-Tautu in April 2015 following the 2015 Vaipae-Tautu by-election
- Pumati Israela was elected to the seat of Arutanga-Reureu-Nikaupara following the resignation of Teina Bishop.
- In April 2017 Albert Nicholas resigned from parliament in order to end speculation over his defection from the Democrats. He was re-elected in the resulting 2017 Avatiu–Ruatonga–Palmerston by-election.
