= 12th Cook Islands Parliament =

The 12th Cook Islands Parliament was a term of the Parliament of the Cook Islands. Its composition was determined by the 1999 election, held on 16 June 1999. It lasted until 2004.

== Initial party standings ==
Party	Votes	%	Seats	+/–
Cook Islands Party			11	–9
Democratic Party			10	+7
New Alliance Party			4	+2
Invalid/blank votes		–	–	–
Total			25	0
Registered voters/turnout	9,430	89%	–	–

== Members ==
=== Initial MPs ===
The seat of Pukapuka–Nassau was initially vacant due to a tied vote and the need for a judicial recount.

Name	Party	Electorate	Term
Teina Bishop	CIP	Arutanga–Reureu–Nikaupara	First
Tupou Faireka	CIP	Tupapa–Maraerenga	Third
Norman George	NAP	Tengatangi–Areora–Ngatiarua	Fifth
Maria Heather	DP	Ruaau	First
Geoffrey Henry	CIP	Takuvaine–Tutakimoa	Sixth
Kete Ioane	DP	Vaipae–Tautu	First
Terepai Maoate	DP	Ngatangiia	Fifth
Tom Marsters	CIP	Murienua	Third
Jim Marurai	NAP	Ivirua	Second
Ngamau Munokoa	DP	Nikao–Panama	Second
Albert (Peto) Nicholas	NAP	Avatiu–Ruatonga–Palmerston	Second
Peri Vaevae Pare	DP	Matavera	First
Mii Parima	CIP	Tamarua	Second
Papamama Pokino	CIP	Oneroa	
Pupuke Robati	DP	Rakahanga	
Upokomaki Simpson	DP	Teenui–Mapumai	Second
Mapu Taia	DP	Mauke	First
Teremoana Tapi Taio	DP	Akaoa	First
Paora Teiti	CIP	Amuri–Ureia	
Tepure Tapaitau	CIP	Penrhyn	Second
Tangata Vavia	CIP	Mitiaro	Second
Robert Wigmore	DP	Titikaveka	First
Joe Williams	CIP	Overseas	
Robert Woonton	DP	Manihiki	Second

=== Summary of changes ===
- The seat of Pukapuka–Nassau was found to be a dead tie after a judicial recount. The 1999 Pukapuka-Nassau by-election was found to be invalid. A second by-election was held on 28 September 2000 and resulted in the election of the Democratic Party's Tiaki Wuatai.
- In 2002 Tepure Tapaitau was disqualified from Parliament, precipitating the 2002 Penrhyn by-election. It was won by Wilkie Rasmussen, who was then a CIP candidate.
- Maria Heather died in June 2003, precipitating the 2003 Rua'au by-election. She was replaced by her husband, Geofrey Heather.
