= 19th Cook Islands Parliament =

2026 term

19th Parliament of the Cook Islands
←	18th Parliament
- Parliament House, Avarua

Overview
- Legislative body: Parliament of the Cook Islands
- Election: 2026 general election
- Government: Fourth Cook Islands Party Government
- Website: parliament.gov.ck

House of Representatives
- Members: 24
- Prime Minister: Mark Brown
- Leader of the Opposition: Robert Stanley Heather
- Party control: Cook Islands Party

House of Ariki
- Members: 24
- President of the House of Ariki: Tou Travel Ariki

Sovereign
- Monarch: Charles III
- King's Representative: Tom Marsters

The 19th Cook Islands Parliament is the current term of the Parliament of the Cook Islands. Its composition was determined by the 2026 elections on 12 August 2026.

The first sitting day of the 19th parliament was initially proposed to be on 2 December 2026 with the ceremonial opening on 3 December 2026. However, three electoral petitions were received and are unlikely to be heard until 2027, thereby delaying the opening of parliament.

== Officeholders ==
=== Presiding officers ===
- Speaker of the House: TBD
- Deputy Speaker of the House: TBD

==== Other parliamentary officers ====
- Clerk: Tangata Vainerere
- Clerk Assistant: Tai Manavaroa

=== Party leaders ===
- Prime Minister: Hon. Mark Brown (Cook Islands Party)
  - Deputy Prime Minister: TBD
- Leader of the Opposition: Hon. Robert Stanley Heather (Cook Islands United Party)
  - Deputy leader of the Opposition: Hon. Taneao Ngamata (Cook Islands United Party)

=== Floor leaders ===
- Leader of the House: TBD

=== Whips ===
- Government Whip: TBD
- Opposition Whip: Hon. Tim Varu (Cook Islands United Party)

== Members ==
=== Initial party standings ===
Graph of the party split among 24 seats.
Party	Votes	%	+/–	Seats	+/–
Cook Islands Party	4,175	45.32	+1.25	13	+1
Cook Islands United Party	2,866	31.11	+12.30	4	+1
Democratic Party	1,116	12.11	–14.82	0	–5
Progressive Party of the Cook Islands	53	0.58	+0.38	0	0
Independents (Note: Includes the Atiu candidates who ran under the Independent-Enuamanu label and the Mauke candidate who ran under the Independence Party label.)	1,003	10.89	+3.58	7	+4
Total	9,213	100.00	–	24	0

=== Initial MPs ===
Constituency		Name	Party	Term
Rarotonga	Akaoa	Robert Stanley Heather	Cook Islands United	Second
Rarotonga	Avatiu–Ruatonga–Palmerston	Albert Nicholas	Cook Islands	Fourth
Rarotonga	Matavera	Taneao Ngamata	Cook Islands United	First
Rarotonga	Murienua	Teariki Heather	Cook Islands United	Sixth
Rarotonga	Ngatangiia	Tukaka Ama	Cook Islands	Second
Rarotonga	Nikao–Panama	Vaine Mokoroa	Cook Islands	Third
Rarotonga	Ruaau	Tim Tunui Varu	Cook Islands United	Second
Rarotonga	Takuvaine–Tutakimoa	Mark Brown	Cook Islands	Fifth
Rarotonga	Titikaveka	Sonny Williams	Cook Islands	Second
Rarotonga	Tupapa–Maraerenga	Tamaiti Maru Willie	Cook Islands	First
Aitutaki	Amuri–Ureia	Toanui Isamaela	Cook Islands	Fourth
Aitutaki	Arutanga–Reureu–Nikaupara	Tereapii Maki-Kavana	Cook Islands	Third
Aitutaki	Vaipae–Tautu	Teokotai Herman	Cook Islands	Second
Mangaia	Ivirua	Agnes Armstrong	Independent	Third
Mangaia	Oneroa	Rimmel Poila-Mokoroa	Independent	First
Mangaia	Tamarua	Tetangi Matapo	Independent	Fifth
Atiu	Teenui–Mapumai	Rose Toki-Brown	Independent-Enuamanu	Fourth
Atiu	Tengatangi–Areora–Ngatiarua	Te-Hani Brown	Independent-Enuamanu	Third
Outer Islands	Manihiki	George Maggie Angene	Independent	Fifth (Note: Previously the MP for Tupapa-Maraerenga)
Outer Islands	Mauke	Stephen Matapo	Independence Party	Second
Outer Islands	Mitiaro	Tuakeu Tangatapoto	Cook Islands	Third
Outer Islands	Penrhyn	Vaine Wichman	Cook Islands	First
Outer Islands	Pukapuka–Nassau	Tingika Elikana	Cook Islands	Third
Outer Islands	Rakahanga	Levi Hitarahera Teinaki	Cook Islands	First

=== Changes ===
The following changes in Members of Parliament occurred during the term of the 19th Parliament:

#	Seat	Incumbent				Replacement			
#	Seat	Party	Name	Date vacated	Reason	Party	Name	Date elected	Change
1.	Mauke	Independent	Stephen Matapo	September 2026	Joined the Cook Islands Party	Cook Islands	Stephen Matapo	September 2026	CIP gain Independent loss
