= 2010 Cook Islands general election =

- 17 November 2010
- All 24 seats in the Parliament; 13 seats needed for a majority
Party	Leader	Vote %	Seats	+/–
Cook Islands	Henry Puna	43.80	16	+9
Democratic	Robert Wigmore	38.54	8	−6
This lists parties that won seats. See the complete results below.
Prime Minister before	Prime Minister after
Jim Marurai; Democratic	Henry Puna; Cook Islands

A general election was held in the Cook Islands on 17 November 2010 to elect 24 MPs to the Cook Islands Parliament. The Cook Islands Party won 16 seats, a two-thirds majority. Voter turnout was 78%.

A binding referendum on whether the number of MPs should be reduced from 24 was held at the same time as the election.

== Background ==
The Democratic Party government of Prime Minister Jim Marurai, which had governed since 2004, effectively collapsed in December 2009 after Finance Minister Terepai Maoate was sacked for his mishandling of a bid to buy the Toa fuel tank farm. This resulted in a mass-resignation of Democratic Party cabinet members, the expulsion of Marurai and his supporters, and the withdrawal of support for the government. Marurai then refused to reconvene Parliament in order to forestall a confidence vote. A formal split in the Democratic Party was averted in June 2010 when a party conference readmitted Marurai and the other Cabinet members, and appointed Deputy Prime Minister Robert Wigmore as party leader, with Wilkie Rasmussen as his deputy. However, several senior MPs, including former leader Terepai Maoate and former President John Tangi subsequently failed to win reselection and ran as independents.

In the leadup to the election two sitting MPs announced their retirement: Piho Rua and Speaker of the House Mapu Taia. Both were members of the Democratic Party.

Parliament was dissolved on 24 September. Candidate registration closed on 15 October. 70 candidates registered, including 24 from the Cook Islands Party, 23 from the Democrats, 6 from the Te Kura O Te ‘Au People's Movement and 16 independents. Of the 70 candidates, eight were women.

== Campaign ==
The Democratic Party launched its campaign on October 7 in vaka Takitumu with the campaign slogan "Our Future. Now." The party promised stability, benefit increases, and public service cuts. It contested every electorate except Arutanga-Nikaupara-Reureu.

The Cook Islands Party launched their campaign on October 8, promising an increased child benefit, a $1000 "baby bonus", water tanks for every household and to address the cost of living. They also promised to prevent "reckless" public spending by making Ministers and public servants personally liable for any misspent funds.

== Opinion polls ==
On 11 September 2010, a poll of 182 voters conducted by the Cook Islands News reported that the Democratic Party had 33% support, the Cook Islands Party 26%, and independents 14%. The margin of error of the poll was 7%.

A poll of 100 Rarotongans conducted by the Cook Islands Herald on 1 November found that 24% named Democratic Party leader Robert Wigmore as their preferred Prime Minister, 18% preferred Wilkie Rasmussen, 8% Prime Minister Jim Marurai, 5% Cook Islands Party leader Henry Puna, 2% CIP deputy Teina Bishop and 10% others, with 33% undecided.

== Results ==
The election resulted in a two-thirds majority for the Cook Islands Party. Following the election, CIP leader Henry Puna was sworn in as Prime Minister.

Four electoral petitions were subsequently lodged, challenging the results in the electorates of Pukapuka-Nassau, Rakahanga, Tamarua and Vaipae-Tautu. The petitions were heard in January and February 2011. The results in Rakahanga and Tamarua were upheld. Pukapuka-Nassau held a new election in 2011.

Party	Votes	%	Seats	+/–
Cook Islands Party	3,753	43.80	16	+9
Democratic Party	3,302	38.54	8	–6
Party Tumu	160	1.87	0	New
Te Kura O Te ʻAu People's Movement	145	1.69	0	New
Independents	1,208	14.10	0	–2
Total	8,568	100.00	24	0
Registered voters/turnout	10,346	–		
Source: ESG Cook-Islands, IFES

=== By electorate ===
Constituency	Candidate	Party	Votes	%	Notes
Akaoa	Teariki Heather	Cook Islands	203	53.42	Re-elected
Akaoa	Teremoana Tapi Taio	Democratic	177	46.58	
Amuri-Ureia	Toanui Isamaela	Cook Islands	172	48.86	Elected
Amuri-Ureia	Terepai Maoate Jnr	Democratic	143	40.63	Unseated
Amuri-Ureia	Ngatuaine Tutai Tom	Te Kura O Te ʻAu	27	7.67	
Amuri-Ureia	John Tini	Independent	10	2.84	
Arutanga-Reureu-Nikaupara	Teina Bishop	Cook Islands	186	55.52	Re-elected
Arutanga-Reureu-Nikaupara	May Kavana	Te Kura O Te ʻAu	84	25.07	
Arutanga-Reureu-Nikaupara	Harold Arthur Browne	Independent	65	19.40	
Avatiu-Ruatonga-Palmerston	John Henry	Cook Islands	269	46.86	Elected
Avatiu-Ruatonga-Palmerston	Albert (Peto) Nicholas	Party Tumu	160	27.87	Unseated
Avatiu-Ruatonga-Palmerston	Sam Crocombe	Democratic	135	23.52	
Avatiu-Ruatonga-Palmerston	Mike Tavioni	Te Kura O Te ʻAu	10	1.74	
Ivirua	Jim Marurai	Democratic	69	93.24	Re-elected
Ivirua	Moe Lucre	Cook Islands	5	6.76	
Manihiki	Henry Puna	Cook Islands	100	54.64	Elected
Manihiki	Apii Piho	Democratic	73	39.89	Unseated
Manihiki	Rangi Mitaera	Independent	10	5.46	
Matavera	Kiriau Turepu	Cook Islands	324	57.96	Elected
Matavera	Cassey Eggelton	Democratic	235	42.04	Unseated
Mauke	Tai Tura	Cook Islands	124	59.33	Elected
Mauke	Hugh Richard Graham	Democratic	85	40.67	
Mitiaro	Tangata Vavia	Democratic	65	60.19	Re-elected
Mitiaro	Tuakeu Tangatapoto	Cook Islands	43	39.81	
Murienua	Tom Marsters	Cook Islands	193	42.70	Re-elected
Murienua	James Vini Beer	Democratic	127	28.10	
Murienua	Teariki Unuka	Independent	75	16.59	
Murienua	Angeline Tuara	Independent	54	11.95	
Murienua	Tepaki Nooapii Tepaki	Te Kura O Te ʻAu	3	0.66	
Ngatangiia	Atatoa Herman	Cook Islands	218	40.15	Elected
Ngatangiia	Mann Moetarauri Short	Democratic	175	32.23	
Ngatangiia	Terepai Maoate	Independent	150	27.62	Unseated
Nikao-Panama	Ngamau Munokoa	Democratic	255	39.97	Re-elected
Nikao-Panama	Tangee Tangi Kokaua	Cook Islands	202	31.66	
Nikao-Panama	Philip Vakariti Rongo Nicholas	Independent	181	28.37	
Oneroa	Winton Pickering	Democratic	123	56.94	Re-elected
Oneroa	Tangatataia Vavia	Cook Islands	54	25.00	
Oneroa	Junior Areai Enoka	Independent	39	18.06	
Penrhyn	Wilkie Rasmussen	Democratic	71	50.00	Re-elected
Penrhyn	Willie John	Independent	61	42.96	
Penrhyn	Tini Ford	Cook Islands	10	7.04	
Pukapuka-Nassau	Tekii Lazaro	Cook Islands	88	35.34	Elected
Pukapuka-Nassau	Vai Peua	Independent	84	33.73	Unseated
Pukapuka-Nassau	Tai Ravarua	Democratic	77	30.92	
Rakahanga	Taunga Toka	Democratic	30	51.72	Elected
Rakahanga	Toka Hagai	Cook Islands	28	48.28	
Ruaau	William (Smiley) Heather	Democratic	383	64.70	Re-elected
Ruaau	David Akanoa	Cook Islands	169	28.55	
Ruaau	Ngamau-O-Rongo Tou	Independent	40	6.76	
Takuvaine-Tutakimoa	Mark Brown	Cook Islands	344	63.70	Elected
Takuvaine-Tutakimoa	Ngai Tupa	Democratic	196	36.30	Unseated
Tamarua	Pukeiti Pukeiti	Cook Islands	31	50.82	Re-elected
Tamarua	Andy Matapo	Democratic	30	49.18	
Tamarua	Mimau Tom	Te Kura O Te ʻAu	0	0.00	
Teenui-Mapumai	Norman George	Cook Islands	79	69.91	Re-elected
Teenui-Mapumai	Pukeiti Ngametua	Democratic	34	30.09	
Tengatangi-Areora-Ngatiarua	Nandi Glassie	Cook Islands	90	56.60	Re-elected
Tengatangi-Areora-Ngatiarua	Eugene Tatuava	Democratic	69	43.40	
Titikaveka	Robert Wigmore	Democratic	328	45.81	Re-elected
Titikaveka	Taivero Isamaela	Cook Islands	228	31.84	
Titikaveka	Teariki Matenga Jnr	Independent	94	13.13	
Titikaveka	Teava Iro	Independent	66	9.22	
Tupapa-Maraerenga	George Angene	Cook Islands	430	44.51	Elected
Tupapa-Maraerenga	Nooroa Tupa	Democratic	263	27.23	
Tupapa-Maraerenga	Timothy Paul Arnold	Independent	181	18.74	
Tupapa-Maraerenga	John Tangi	Independent	92	9.52	Unseated
Vaipae-Tautu	Mona Ioane	Cook Islands	163	46.70	Elected
Vaipae-Tautu	Kete Ioane	Democratic	159	45.56	Unseated
Vaipae-Tautu	Simiona Teva Robert	Te Kura O Te ʻAu	21	6.02	
Vaipae-Tautu	Punua Marsters	Independent	6	1.72	

== See also ==
- 2010 Cook Islands Member of Parliament reduction referendum
