= 2019 Tengatangi-Areora-Ngatiarua by-election =

There were two by-elections for the Tengatangi-Areora-Ngatiarua constituency in 2019:

- March 2019 Tengatangi-Areora-Ngatiarua by-election, caused by the defection of Te-Hani Brown from the Democratic Party.
- November 2019 Tengatangi-Areora-Ngatiarua by-election, caused by the resignation of Te-Hani Brown.
