= Kete Ioane =

Cook Islands politician (1950–2015)

Minister of Justice
- In office 2006 – 23 December 2009
- Prime Minister: Jim Marurai
- Preceded by: Ngamau Munokoa
- Succeeded by: Apii Piho

Minister of Health
- In office 31 July 2009 – 23 December 2009
- Preceded by: Terepai Maoate
- Succeeded by: Apii Piho

Minister for the Environment
- In office 2006 – 31 July 2009
- Succeeded by: Ngamau Munokoa

Member of the Cook Islands Parliament for Vaipae–Tautu
- In office 16 June 1999 – 17 November 2010
- Preceded by: Thomas Hewitt
- Succeeded by: Mona Ioane

Personal details
- Born: 30 October 1950 Amuri, Aitutaki
- Died: 13 February 2015 (aged 64) Auckland, New Zealand
- Party: Cook Islands Democratic Party

Kete Ioane (30 October 1950 – 13 February 2015) was a Cook Islands politician. He was a Cook Islands Democratic Party Member of Parliament from 1999 to 2010 and served as a cabinet minister between 2006 and 2009.

== Biography ==
Ioane was born in Amuri on the island of Aitutaki. He attended Amuri and Araura Primary school and Aitutaki Junior High School. He has a long career as a public servant, first in the Agriculture Department, later in the Police Department. He was first elected to Parliament as member for Vaipae–Tautu in the 1999 elections.

From 1999 to 2005 Ioane served as party whip. Shortly before the 2006 election he was appointed to Cabinet. His appointment later became the subject of an electoral petition, as rival Cook Islands Party candidate George Pitt claimed it had been made solely to provide Ioane with extra campaign funds. The petition was ultimately rejected, but Prime Minister Jim Marurai was criticised by the Chief Justice over the appointment.

Ioane held the portfolios of Minister for the Environment, Justice, and Parliamentary Services A reshuffle in July 2009 saw him removed as Environment Minister and given the Health portfolio. He resigned from Cabinet in December 2009 in protest at the sacking from Cabinet of Democratic Party leader Terepai Maoate.

Ioane failed to win re-election in the 2010 and 2014 general elections. He was selected as the Democratic Party's candidate for the 2015 by-election in the Vaipae-Tautu constituency, but died in Auckland on 13 February, just four days before the election.
