= Cassey Eggelton =

Cook Islands politician

Minister for the Environment
- In office 23 March 2010 – 3 December 2010
- Prime Minister: Jim Marurai
- Preceded by: Jim Marurai
- Succeeded by: Henry Puna

Minister of Cultural Development
- In office 23 March 2010 – 3 December 2010
- Preceded by: Robert Wigmore
- Succeeded by: Teariki Heather

Deputy Speaker of the Parliament of the Cook Islands
- Incumbent
- Assumed office 29 June 2007

Member of the Cook Islands Parliament for Matavera
- In office 27 September 2006 – 17 November 2010
- Preceded by: Kiriau Turepu
- Succeeded by: Kiriau Turepu

Personal details
- Born: 26 February 1952 (age 74) Rarotonga
- Party: Democratic Party

Cassey Tereapii Eggelton (born 26 February 1952) is a former Cook Islands politician and Cabinet Minister.

Eggelton was born in Rarotonga and attended Ngatangiia Primary school and Tereora College. She worked as a hotel manager and has a long association with the Miss Cook Islands Pageant. In 2003 she was appointed Honorary French Consul to the Cook Islands. In 2004 she was invested with the chefly title Tara’are Mataiapo.

== Political career ==
Eggelton was elected to Parliament as a member of the Democratic Party for the seat of Matavera in the 2006 elections.

Eggelton was initially appointed Deputy Speaker, and was later appointed to the Cabinet of Jim Marurai in March 2010 as Minister for Culture and the Environment. After she refused to resign from the cabinet following a request, she was expelled from the Democratic Party on 8 April 2010. She failed to win re-election in the 2010 election. She ran again in the 2014 election but was unsuccessful. She failed to win selection as a candidate for the 2018 election.

Eggleton's brother-in-law is Queen's Representative Frederick Tutu Goodwin.
