= Ruaau (electorate) =

Electoral division of the Cook Islands

- Constituency for the Parliament of the Cook Islands
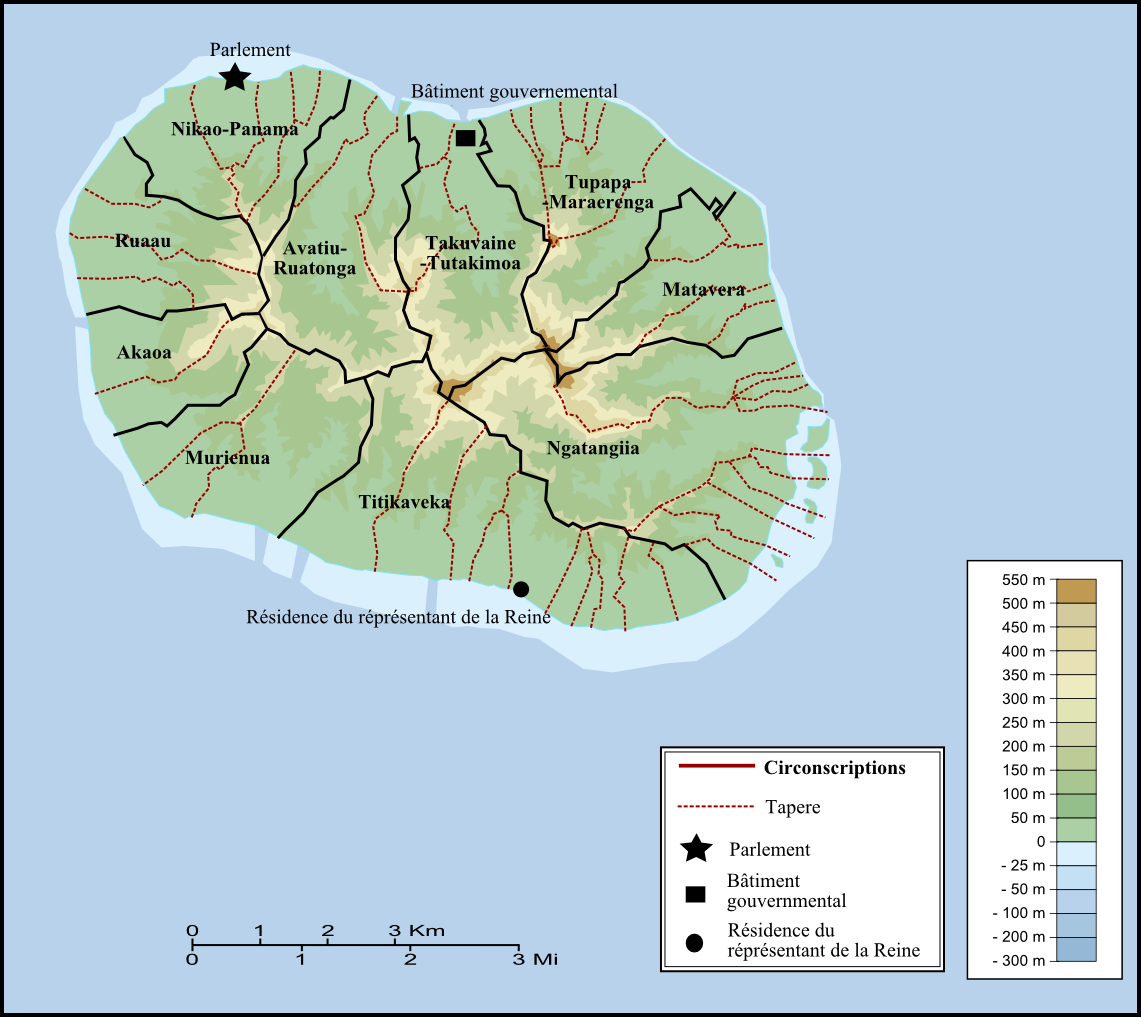
- Region: Rarotonga

Current constituency
- Created: 1981
- Number of members: 1
- Member: Tim Tunui Varu
- Created from: Puaikura

Ruaau is a Cook Islands electoral division returning one member to the Cook Islands Parliament.

The electorate was created in 1981, when the Constitution Amendment (No. 9) Act 1980–1981 adjusted electorate boundaries and split the electorate of Puaikura into two. It currently consists of the tapere of Pokoinu-i-Raro, Tokerau, Inave, and Arerenga on the island of Rarotonga.

== Members of Parliament ==
Election	Member	Party
1983 (March)	Henry Napa	Democratic Party
1994	Boy Tepai	Unknown
1999	Maria Heather	Democratic Party
2003 by-election	Geoffrey Heather	Democratic Party
2004	Vaine Wichman	Cook Islands Party
2006, 2010, 2014, 2018	William (Smiley) Heather	Democratic Party
2022, 2026	Tim Tunui Varu	Cook Islands United Party

== Election results ==
2026 Cook Islands general election: Ruaau
Party	Candidate	Votes	%	±%
Cook Islands United	Tim Tunui Varu^{†}	370	51.7	
Cook Islands	Arama Wichman	301	42.1	
Democratic	William (Smiley) Heather	44	6.2	
Turnout		715		
Cook Islands United hold		Swing		
^{†} incumbent
