= Atatoa Herman =

Cook Islands politician (born 1959)

Member of the Cook Islands Parliament for Ngatangiia
- In office 17 November 2010 – 9 July 2014
- Preceded by: Terepai Maoate
- Succeeded by: Tamaiva Tuavera

Personal details
- Party: Cook Islands Party

Atatoa Joseph Herman (born 2 December 1959) is a Cook Islands politician and former member of the Cook Islands Parliament. He is a member of the Cook Islands Party.

Herman was born in Rarotonga. He attended school in Auckland, New Zealand, then shifted to the Cook Islands as a student at Avarua Primary school, Avatea Primary school and Tereora College. He studied at the University of Canterbury in Christchurch, New Zealand, graduating with a Bachelor of Engineering. After a career as a public servant, culminating in serving as Secretary of Works between 2003 and 2008, Herman was elected to the seat of Ngatangiia at the 2010 election. In May 2011 he was made associate minister for the environment. He lost his seat at the 2014 election.

Herman was invested with the traditional Teaia Mataiapo title in 2009.
