= Pukeiti Pukeiti =

Member of the Cook Islands Parliament for Tamarua
- In office 3 February 2009 – 18 October 2012
- Preceded by: Mii Parima
- Succeeded by: Tetangi Matapo

Personal details
- Died: 18 October 2012
- Party: Cook Islands Party

Pukeiti Pukeiti (c. 1948 - 18 October 2012) was a Cook Islands politician and Member of the Cook Islands Parliament. He was a member of the Cook Islands Party. He represented the electorate of Tamarua.

Pukeiti was elected to Parliament in the 2009 Tamarua by-election following the death of MP Mii Parima. He was re-elected at the 2010 election.

Pukeiti's death precipitated the 2013 Tamarua by-election.
