= 2011 Pukapuka by-election =

Election in the Cook Islands

A by-election was held in the Cook Islands electorate of Pukapuka-Nassau on 7 June 2011. The by-election was precipitated by an electoral petition declaring the election of Tekii Lazaro in the 2010 election invalid.

The election was contested by two candidates, and won by the Cook Islands Party's Tekii Lazaro.

Pukapuka by-election 2011
Party	Candidate	Votes	%	±%
Cook Islands	Tekii Lazaro	134		
Democratic	Vai Peua	84		
Turnout				
