= Tingika Elikana =

Cook Islands politician (born 1961)

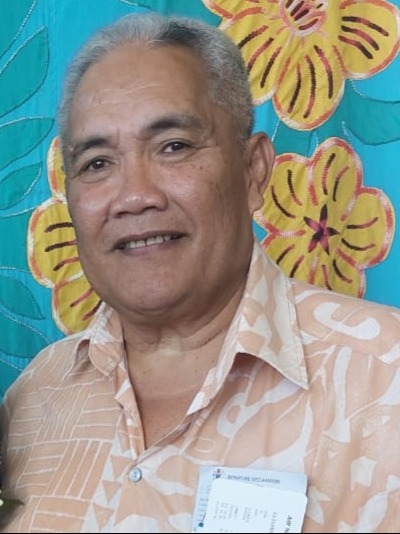
- Tingika Elikana in 2025

Minister of Foreign Affairs
- Incumbent
- Assumed office 8 February 2024
- Preceded by: Mark Brown

Minister of Marine Resources
- Incumbent
- Assumed office 8 February 2024
- Preceded by: Robert Tapaitau

Deputy Speaker of the Parliament of the Cook Islands
- Incumbent
- Assumed office 22 March 2021
- Preceded by: Tai Tura

Member of the Cook Islands Parliament for Pukapuka–Nassau
- Incumbent
- Assumed office 14 June 2018
- Preceded by: Tekii Lazaro

Personal details
- Born: 5 November 1961 (age 64)
- Party: Cook Islands Party

Tingika Elikana (born 5 November 1961) is a Cook Islands civil servant, politician and Cabinet Minister. He is a member of the Cook Islands Party.

== Early life, education and work ==
Elikana was born on Pukapuka and educated at Pukapuka School and Tereora College. He studied law at Victoria University of Wellington in New Zealand and then a Masters of Business Administration at the University of the South Pacific as well as public sector management at Massey University. He worked as a police officer, and then as a crown prosecutor, Deputy Solicitor General, and Solicitor General. From 2011 to 2018 he was Secretary for Justice.

== Political career ==
He was elected to the Cook Islands Parliament at the 2018 Cook Islands general election. After his election, the government charted a special flight at a cost of $32,000 to collect him from the outer islands. The flight was later the subject of a private prosecution launched against Prime Minister Henry Puna by former MP Norman George. As an MP, Elikana chaired the select committee which decided that homosexuality should remain a criminal offence in the Cook Islands. In February 2020 he was accused of orchestrating the sacking of six public servants who belonged to the opposition Democratic Party. Following the election of Mark Brown as Prime Minister he was appointed Associate Minister of Justice, Finance and Economic Management, Foreign Affairs and Immigration. On 22 March 2021 he was elected Deputy Speaker, replacing Tai Tura.

He was re-elected at the 2022 Cook Islands general election.

In February 2024 following the conviction of Cabinet Minister Robert Tapaitau for corruption he was appointed to Cabinet as Minister of Foreign Affairs, Immigration, and Marine Resources. His first action in the position was to travel to Suva to co-chair the Pacific Alliance Leaders Meeting Ministerial Interim Meeting.

Elikana won re-election at the 2026 general election.
