= Cook Islands National Party =

The Cook Islands National Party was a political party in the Cook Islands. The party was launched on 24 March 2003 by Teariki Heather, a Rarotonga businessman. Its policies included a shorter parliamentary term.

In July 2003 the party sought a declaratory judgement from the High Court that the seats of MPs Norman George and Paora Teiti were vacant after it was learned that the two were being paid as government consultants. The court subsequently ruled that the consultancy work did not constitute holding a position in the public service, and both retained their seats.

Heather contested the 2003 Rua'au by-election as a National Party candidate, but was unsuccessful.

The party was disbanded in February 2004 when Heather joined the Cook Islands Party.
