= 2014 Mitiaro by-election =

Election in the Cook Islands

A by-election was held in the Cook Islands constituency of Mitiaro on 11 November 2014.

In the July 2014 general election, the contest for the Mitiaro seat resulted in a tie. Incumbent MP Tangata Vavia, of the Democratic Party, received 50 votes, but so did Cook Islands Party challenger Tuakeu Tangatapoto. The tie was confirmed by a recount, prompting the High Court to call a by-election

The same two candidates stood in the by-election. The by-election took place, but counting was delayed due to a legal challenge by the Cook Islands Party. The court ultimately ruled that one person had voted illegally in the Mitiaro constituency in the general election, and invalidated that person's ballot. This resulted in Democratic Party candidate Tangata Vavia being declared elected by 50 votes to 49, on the basis of the July vote. The ballots cast during the by-election were discarded without having been counted.
