= 2009 Tamarua by-election =

Election in the Cook Islands

The Tamarua by-election was a by-election in the Cook Islands electorate of Tamarua. It was held on 3 February 2009, and was precipitated by the death of sitting MP Mii Parima.

The by-election was won by the Cook Islands Party's Pukeiti Pukeiti.
