= Tamaiva Tuavera =

Member of the Cook Islands Parliament for Ngatangiia
- In office 9 July 2014 – 1 August 2022
- Preceded by: Atatoa Herman
- Succeeded by: Tukaka Ama

Personal details
- Born: 10 April 1958 (age 68) Matavera, Rarotonga
- Party: Cook Islands Democratic Party

Tamaiva Tuavera (born 10 April 1958) is a Cook Islands politician and former member of the Cook Islands Parliament. He is a member of the Cook Islands Democratic Party.

Tuavera was born in Matavera on Rarotonga. He was educated at Tereora College and at Rutherford High School in Auckland. He dropped out of school, and after working a variety of jobs joined the New Zealand Army in 1976 at the age of 17. He served as a rifleman and instructor, and was posted in Singapore. After being medically discharged in 1991, he returned to Rarotonga, where he married and started a tourism business.

Tuavera was first elected to Parliament in the 2014 Cook Islands general election. In 2015, he was appointed opposition spokesperson for Police, Marine Resources and Culture. His re-election at the 2018 election was challenged on the basis of alleged bribery, but the electoral petition was unsuccessful. In February 2020 he was appointed Democratic Party spokesperson for Police and Marine Resources.

In 2017 he saved the lives of three children on holiday who were swept away while swimming.

He lost his seat in the 2022 Cook Islands general election.
