= Pa George Karika =

NZ-Cook Islands soldier (1893–1949)

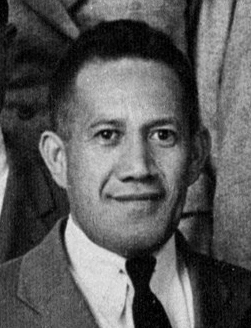
Pa George Karika in 1934

Pa George Karika DCM (1 August 1893 – 5 May 1949) was a New Zealand-Cook Islands leader, clerk, soldier and farmer. Decorated for gallantry during the First World War, he was the only Cook Islander awarded the Distinguished Conduct Medal. From 1942 until his death in 1949 he was the holder of the Makea Karika Ariki title, one of the three chiefly titles of the Te Au o Tonga vaka on Rarotonga.

Karika was born in Avarua, Cook Islands on 1 August 1893. He was the son of Takau Tuaraupoko Mokoroa ki Aitu, later Makea Karika Ariki. He was educated at Tereora College, then run by the London Missionary Society. On 14 July 1915 he married Ngapoko Ariki o Tangiia.

In 1916, when working for the Union Steamship Company, he volunteered for the Māori Reinforcements and became one of 500 Cook Islanders who joined the New Zealand Expeditionary Force. He was initially stationed with the New Zealand Rarotongan Company in El Qantara, Egypt, and in early 1917 was promoted to Sergeant. In late 1917 he participated in the Battle of Jerusalem, and in February 1918 he was awarded the Distinguished Conduct Medal "for conspicuous gallantry and devotion to duty while in command of a platoon". He was the only Pacific islander in the NZEF to receive this decoration

Karika was hospitalised for tuberculosis in late 1918 and returned to New Zealand. He was discharged from the army in 1919 and returned to Rarotonga, where he became a farmer. Like other Cook Island veterans, he was denied a military pension.

In 1942 he inherited the title of Makea Karika Ariki from his mother and was appointed to the Rarotonga Island Council. He held this title until his death in 1949, when he was succeeded by his daughter, Margaret Makea Karika Ariki.
