= Tangata Vavia =

Cook Islands politician

Minister for Infrastructure, Planning and Transport
- In office 17 October 2008 – 23 December 2009
- Prime Minister: Jim Marurai
- Succeeded by: William (Smiley) Heather

Minister for Outer Islands Development
- In office 30 January 2003 – 5 November 2003
- Prime Minister: Robert Woonton
- Succeeded by: Tapi Taio
- In office 16 September 2005 – 27 September 2006
- Prime Minister: Jim Marurai

Minister of Justice
- In office 17 November 1999 – 11 February 2002
- Prime Minister: Terepai Maoate
- Succeeded by: Norman George
- In office 30 January 2003 – 5 November 2003
- Prime Minister: Robert Woonton
- Preceded by: Norman George

Deputy Speaker of the Parliament of the Cook Islands
- In office 1999–1999

Member of the Cook Islands Parliament for Mitiaro
- In office 24 March 1994 – 14 June 2018
- Succeeded by: Tuakeu Tangatapoto

Personal details
- Born: 8 September 1949 (age 76) Mitiaro
- Party: Cook Islands Democratic Party

Tangata Mouauri Vavia (born 8 September 1949) is a Cook Islands politician and former Cabinet Minister. He is a member of the Cook Islands Democratic Party.

Vavia was born in Mitiaro in the Cook Islands. He was educated in Mitiaro then at Avarua, Nikao, Nikao Side School and Tereora College. He worked as a postal clerk, then as a police constable before being elected to Parliament as member for Mitiaro in the 1994 elections.

Vavia was elected Deputy Speaker in 1999. He subsequently served in the Cabinet of Sir Terepai Maoate as Minister of Justice and Outer Islands. He lost his position when Robert Woonton replaced Maoate, but was reappointed briefly in 2003 when Woonton's coalition with the Cook Islands Party fell apart. A further coalition realignment in November of that year saw him resign his portfolios and join the opposition.

In 2005, following the demise of Jim Marurai's "partnership government", he rejoined Cabinet as Minister for Outer Islands Administration. He was re-elected in the 2006 election, and appointed Minister for Infrastructure and Planning, Cook Islands Investment Corporation, and Transport.

Vavia resigned his portfolios in December 2009 in protest at the sacking from Cabinet of Democratic Party leader Terepai Maoate. He was re-elected at the 2010 election. At the 2014 general election, he received exactly the same number of votes as his Cook Islands Party opponent in his Mitiaro constituency. A by-election was held in November, then retroactively cancelled by court order before the ballots could be counted. In December, Vavia was awarded the seat by the court following a recount of the July results. He subsequently lost the seat at the 2018 election.
