= Mona Ioane =

Cook Islands politician

Deputy Speaker of the Parliament of the Cook Islands
- In office 16 September 2016 – 14 June 2018
- Preceded by: Rose Toki-Brown
- Succeeded by: Toka Hagai

Minister of Education
- In office 18 April 2014 – 17 December 2014
- Prime Minister: Henry Puna
- Preceded by: Teina Bishop
- Succeeded by: Henry Puna

Minister of Tourism
- In office 18 April 2014 – 17 December 2014
- Preceded by: Teina Bishop
- Succeeded by: Henry Puna

Member of the Cook Islands Parliament for Vaipae–Tautu
- In office 17 November 2010 – 14 June 2018
- Preceded by: Kete Ioane
- Succeeded by: Kitai Teinakore

Personal details
- Party: Cook Islands Party

Mona Ioane Kake is a Cook Islands politician and former Cabinet Minister. He is a member of the Cook Islands Party.

Ioane is a former police officer with 22 years experience. He was elected to the Cook Islands Parliament for the seat of Vaipae–Tautu in the 2010 election. His election was the subject of an electoral petition from losing Democratic Party candidate Kete Ioane, who alleged that he had used his position on the Aitutaki Cyclone Appeal committee to dispense aid to bribe voters. In April 2014, shortly before the 2014 election, he was appointed to Cabinet as Minister of Education and Tourism, replacing Teina Bishop. He was narrowly re-elected in 2014, but his election was challenged by an election petition, and in December 2014 it was voided after he was found guilty of bribery by the Court of Appeal. He subsequently contested and won the 2015 Vaipae-Tautu by-election, but was excluded from Cabinet. In September 2016 he was elected Deputy Speaker.

Ioane did not win re-election at the 2018 election, losing to Kitai Teinakore.
