= Taunga Toka =

Cook Islands politician

Member of the Cook Islands Parliament for Rakahanga
- In office 17 November 2010 – 9 July 2014
- Preceded by: Piho Rua
- Succeeded by: Toka Hagai

Personal details
- Party: Cook Islands Democratic Party

Taunga Toka is a Cook Islands politician and former member of the Cook Islands Parliament. He is a member of the Cook Islands Democratic Party.

Toka was elected to the seat of Rakahanga in the 2010 election. His election was challenged by an electoral petition alleging that some voters were ineligible to vote, but this was unsuccessful. He was not re-elected at the 2014 election, losing to the Cook Islands Party's Toka Hagai.
