= Party Tumu =

Political party in the Cook Islands

The Party Tumu was a political party in the Cook Islands. It was founded in July 2010 by Cook Islands Party MP Albert (Peto) Nicholas after a split over candidate selection. Originally known as the "Cook Islands Party Tumu" ("real" or "true" Cook Islands Party), the party was forced to rename itself after the CIP successfully sought a court injunction preventing them from using the name Cook Islands Party.

The breakaway party attracted the support of influential CIP backer Tupui Ariki Henry, son of CIP founder and former Prime Minister Albert Henry, but it has not attracted the support of any other CIP MPs. The party's aims were the same as those of the CIP: nationalism and economic development. In addition, the party opposes major political reform and instead supports reforms of the Parliamentary process. It supported coalition government, but opposed any constitutional amendments. The party also wants a commission of inquiry into crown-owned lands, aimed at compensating former land-owners for land taken for government use.

The party did not attract any other election candidates, and Nicholas failed to win his seat. It did not run any candidates in the 2014 elections
