= November 2019 Tengatangi-Areora-Ngatiarua by-election =

Election in the Cook Islands

A by-election was held in the Cook Islands electorate of Tengatangi-Areora-Ngatiarua on 14 November 2019. The by-election was triggered by the resignation of MP Te-Hani Brown following an earlier by-election. The by-election was won by Te-Hani Brown.

== Background ==
The March 2019 Tengatangi-Areora-Ngatiarua by-election was won by Te Hani Brown. Following the by-election, Democratic party candidate Nandi Glassie filed a petition against her victory, alleging that she had effectively bribed voters by covering the charge of a private aircraft to carry voters to vote on Atiu. Brown maintained that this did not constitute an offence. Brown resigned in April 2019 during the process of the petition through the courts and although Glassie was allowed to challenge the election result, this was reversed on appeal. Brown's seat was declared vacant in September 2019, triggering the by-election.

Glassie was too ill to contest the by-election, and the Democratic party instead selected businesswoman June Baudinet.

== Results ==
Candidate	Party	Votes	%
Te-Hani Brown	Independent	95	74.80
June Baudinet	Democratic Party	32	25.20
Total		127	100.00
