= Albert (Peto) Nicholas =

Cook Islands politician

Member of the Cook Islands Parliament for Avatiu–Ruatonga–Palmerston
- In office 24 March 1994 – 17 November 2010
- Preceded by: Rei Jack Enoka
- Succeeded by: John Henry

Personal details
- Party: New Alliance Party; Cook Islands Party; Party Tumu
- Relations: Albert Nicholas

Albert (Peto) Nicholas (9 May 1951 – 15 August 2012) was a Cook Islands politician. He was member of the Cook Islands Parliament for the seat of the seat of Avatiu–Ruatonga–Palmerston for 18 years.

Nicholas was born on Rarotonga and educated at St Joseph primary school and Tereora College. He was first elected to Parliament as a member of the Alliance Party in the 1994 election. He was re-elected in 1999 as a member of the New Alliance Party, but switched allegiance to the Cook Islands Party later that year.

Nicholas left the CIP in July 2010 following a dispute about candidate selection, and founded the Party Tumu. He stood under that party's banner in the 2010 election, but was unsuccessful.

On 15 August 2012 Nicholas died of a heart attack while driving in Rarotonga.
