= 2013 Tamarua by-election =

Election in the Cook Islands

- 29 January 2013

Constituency of Tamarua
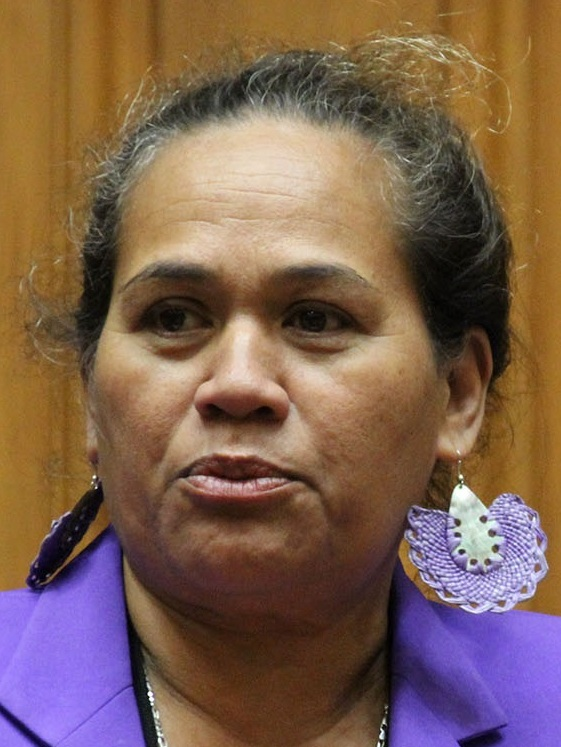
	First party	Second party
		CIP
Candidate	Tetangi Matapo	Tokorua Pareina
Party	Democratic	Cook Islands
Popular vote	28	26
Percentage	51.85%	48.15%
MP before election
Pukeiti Pukeiti
Cook Islands
Elected MP
Tetangi Matapo
Democratic

The 2013 Tamarua by-election was a by-election in the Cook Islands electorate of Tamarua. It was held on 29 January 2013, and was precipitated by the death of sitting MP Pukeiti Pukeiti.

The by-election was won by the Democratic Party's Tetangi Matapo.

Tamarua by-election 2013
Party	Candidate	Votes	%	±%
Democratic	Tetangi Matapo	28	51.9%	
Cook Islands	Tokorua Pareina	26	48.1%	
Turnout		54	100%	
