= Te Kura O Te ʻAu People's Movement =

Te Kura O Te ʻAu People's Movement is a political movement in the Cook Islands. It has several founding members, but its current leader is Tim Tepaki. It is currently unrepresented in the Cook Islands Parliament.

The People's Movement was originally established in 2009 as a pressure group in response to the introduction on Sunday flights to the island of Aitutaki. It initially denied being a political party, but in May 2010 confirmed that it would contest the 2010 general election.

The party supports political reform, including a "major" reduction in the size of parliament. It proposes suspending all Sunday flights to Aitutaki, followed by a referendum to determine whether than ban will be made permanent.

The party will select candidates in July 2010. Following the selection process the candidates will elect a party leader and committee.

The party ran six candidates in the 2010 election, but none were successful. It did not run any candidates in the 2014 elections.
