= Tamarua (electorate) =

Electoral division of the Cook Islands

- Constituency for the Parliament of the Cook Islands
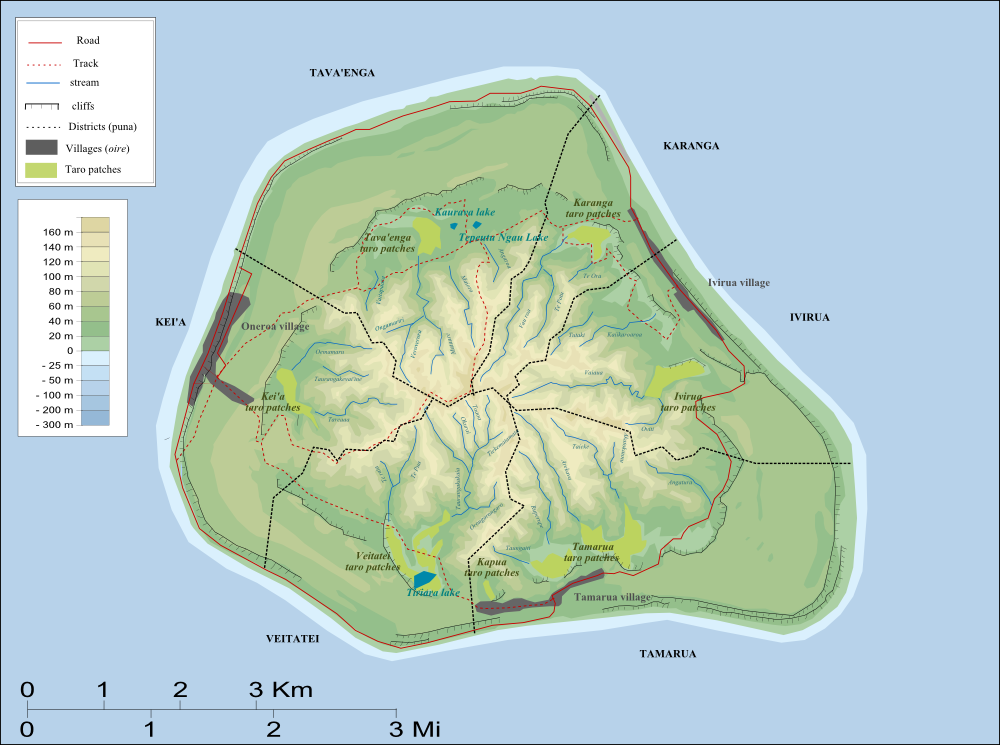
- Region: Mangaia

Current constituency
- Created: 1981
- Number of members: 1
- Member: Tetangi Matapo
- Created from: Mangaia

Tamarua is a Cook Islands electoral division, with one representative in the Cook Islands Parliament. Its current representative is Tetangi Matapo, who has held the seat since winning a by-election in 2013.

The electorate consists of the district of Tamarua on the island of Mangaia. It was created in 1981, when the Constitution Amendment (No. 9) Act 1980–1981 adjusted electorate boundaries and split the electorate of Mangaia into three.

== Members of Parliament for Tamarua ==
Unless otherwise stated, all MPs terms began and ended at general elections.

Election	Member	Party
1994, 1999, 2004, 2006	Mii Parima	Cook Islands Party
2009, 2010	Pukeiti Pukeiti	Cook Islands Party
2013, 2014, 2018, 2022	Tetangi Matapo	Democratic Party
2026	Tetangi Matapo	Independent

== Electoral results ==
2026 Cook Islands general election: Tamarua
Party	Candidate	Votes	%	±%
Independent	Tetangi Matapo^{†}	34	59.6	
Cook Islands	Ngatamaroa Ngatokorua	23	40.4	
Turnout		57		
Independent gain from Democratic		Swing		
^{†} incumbent

2018 Cook Islands general election
Party	Candidate	Votes	%	±%
Democratic	Tetangi Matapo	31	59.6	+7.0
Cook Islands	Mia Teaurima	21	40.4	−7.0
Democratic hold		Swing	+7.0	

2014 Cook Islands general election
Party	Candidate	Votes	%	±%
Democratic	Tetangi Matapo	30	52.6	+0.7
Cook Islands	Tokorua Pareina	27	47.4	−0.7
Democratic hold		Swing	+0.7	

2013 Tamarua by-election
Party	Candidate	Votes	%	±%
Democratic	Tetangi Matapo	28	51.9	+3.6
Cook Islands	Tokorua Pareina	26	48.1	−3.6
Democratic gain from Cook Islands		Swing	+3.6	

2010 Cook Islands general election
Party	Candidate	Votes	%	±%
Cook Islands	Pukeiti Pukeiti	31	51.7	−9.6
Democratic	Andy Matapo	29	48.3	+9.6
Te Kura O Te ʻAu	Mimau Tom	0	0.0	—
Cook Islands hold		Swing	-9.6	

2006 Cook Islands general election
Party	Candidate	Votes	%	±%
Cook Islands	Mii Parima	38	61.3	−7.0
Democratic	Andy Matapo	24	38.7	+7.0
Cook Islands hold		Swing	-7.0	

2004 Cook Islands general election
Party	Candidate	Votes	%	±%
Cook Islands	Mii Parima	43	68.3	
Democratic	Andy Matapo	20	31.7	
Cook Islands hold		Swing		
