= 2015 Vaipae-Tautu by-election =

Election in the Cook Islands

A by-election was held in the Cook Islands constituency of Vaipae-Tautu on 31 March 2015. It was won by Mona Ioane, the Cook Islands Party candidate, consolidating the ruling party's slender majority in Parliament.

== Context and candidates ==
In the July 2014 general election, the contest for the Vaipae-Tautu seat had been won by Cook Islands Party candidate Mona Ioane, who went on to serve as Education Minister in Prime Minister Henry Puna's government. Ioane's election to Parliament was voided by the Court of Appeal on 17 December, reducing the Puna government to a minority government. The by-election would therefore be crucial both to the government and to the Opposition Democratic Party. If they won the seat, the Democrats "could assume power in coalition with the One Cook Islands Movement" (OCIM). OCIM leader Teina Bishop indicated his party would not run a candidate against Democratic candidate Kete Ioane, and would in fact support the latter's campaign.

The by-election was initially due to be held on 17 February 2015. But Democratic Party candidate's Kete Ioane's sudden death on 13 February led to a postponement. The election will now be held on 31 March. At the start of March, the One Cook Islands Movement reversed its decision not to stand against the Democrats, and announced Amiria Davey as its candidate. The Cook Islands Party maintained Mona Ioane as its candidate. The Democrats selected Kete Ioane's widow, Teinakore Ioane.

== Results ==
Candidate	Party	Votes	%
Mona Ioane	Cook Islands Party	174	47.28
Amiria Davey	One Cook Islands Movement	98	26.63
Teinakore Ioane	Democratic Party	96	26.09
Total		368	100.00
