= Rei Jack Enoka =

Cook Islands politician (1939–2023)

Rei Jack Enoka OBE

Member of the Cook Islands Parliament for Avatiu–Ruatonga–Palmerston
- In office 19 January 1989 – 24 March 1994
- Succeeded by: Albert (Peto) Nicholas

Member of the Cook Islands Parliament for Te-au-o-Tonga
- In office 30 March 1983 – 2 November 1983
- Preceded by: Thomas Davis
- Succeeded by: Thomas Davis

Personal details
- Born: 3 September 1939 Ruatonga, Cook Islands
- Died: 4 January 2023 (aged 83)
- Party: Cook Islands Party

Moeroa o Rei Ki Kaikaveka Jack Enoka OBE (3 September 1939 – 4 January 2023) was a Cook Islands politician and member of the Parliament of the Cook Islands.

Enoka was born in Ruatonga on the island of Rarotonga and educated at Avarua School. He was active in the Cook Islands Boys Brigade as a band master, and as a boxer, and worked at the Government Printing office and as a storeowner. In 1977, he was invested with the title of Uirangi Mataiapo.

He stood for Parliament in the 1978 Cook Islands general election and was elected, but the result was subsequently annulled after Prime Minister Albert Henry was found to have corruptly used public funds to fly in voters to influence the result. He stood again in the March 1983 Cook Islands general election, when he defeated Thomas Davis in the electorate of Te-au-o-Tonga. He lost his seat seven months later in the November 1983 Cook Islands general election. He was re-elected at the 1989 election in the seat of Avatiu–Ruatonga–Palmerston, and was appointed Leader of the House. He lost his seat again at the 1994 election. After leaving politics he became a farmer and grew flowers for churches and hotels. He also ran a guesthouse.

He was made an officer of the Order of the British Empire for public services and services to the community in the 2016 Birthday Honours.
