= Margaret Makea Karika Ariki =

Cook Islands politician (1919–2017)

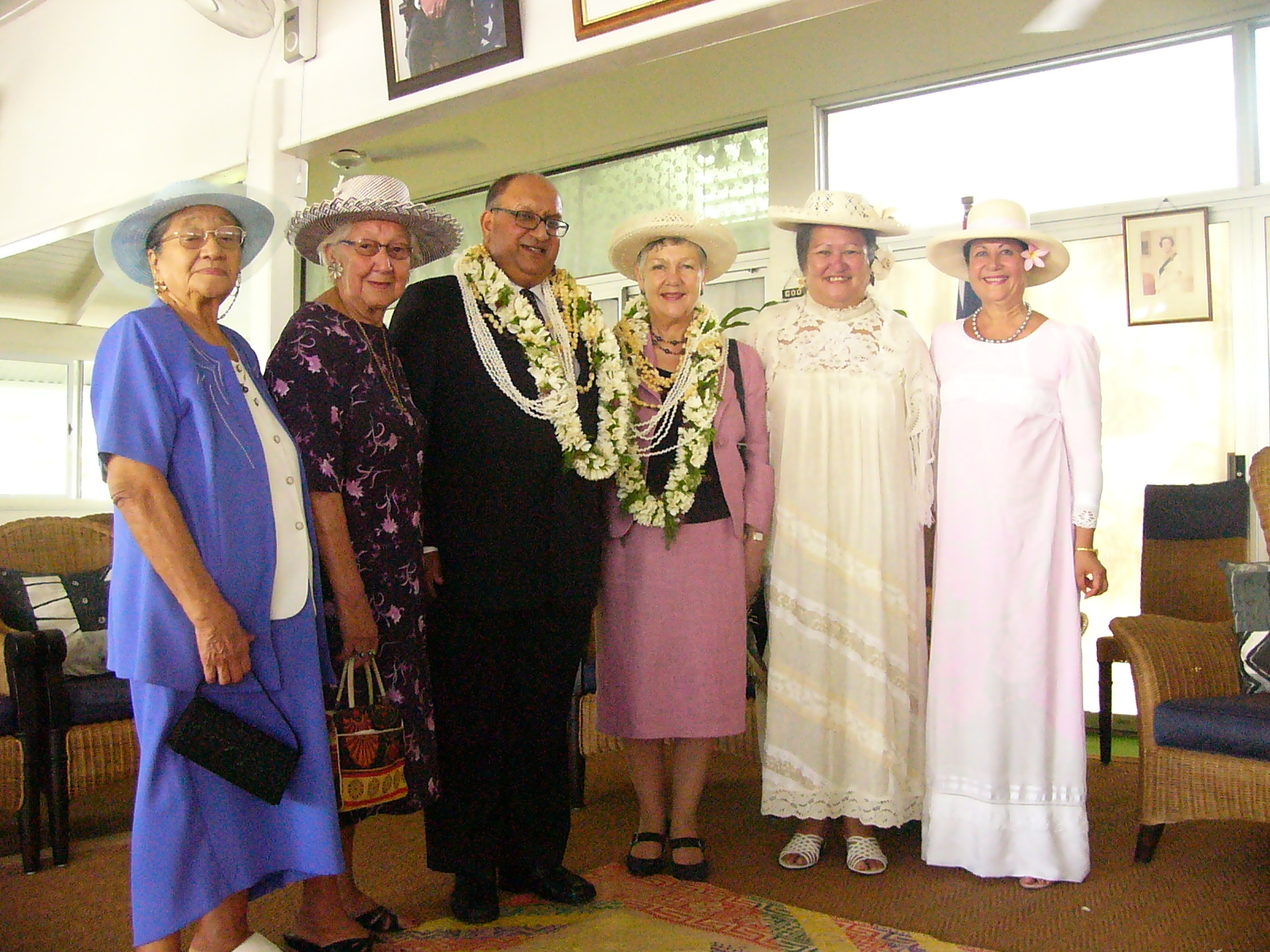
NZ Governor-General Anand Satyanand with members of the Cook Islands House of Ariki, 2007. Margaret Makea Karika Ariki is second from left.

Dame Margaret Makea Karika Ariki DBE (12 December 1919 – 22 September 2017), also known as Pauline Margaret Rakera George Karika and Pauline Margaret Rakera Taripo, was a Cook Islands ariki and holder of the Makea Karika Ariki title from 1949 to 2017. She was President of the House of Ariki from 1978 to 1980, and again from 1990 to 1992. She also served in the Legislative Assembly from 1958 to 1961.

== Biography ==
The daughter of Pa George Karika, she was educated at St Joseph Primary School and at Avarua School before becoming a sales assistant at the Cook Islands Trading Company. Following the death of her elder sister in 1928, she became an aide to her grandmother, Karika Takau Ariki. In 1942 she married Ernest Teiho Taripo.

Her father became Makea Karika Ariki in 1942, and she succeeded to the title following his death in May 1949. On succeeding to the title she was appointed to the Rarotonga Island Council, on which she served until self-government in 1965. As a member of the council, she was elected to the Legislative Assembly in the 1958 general elections, on which she served until 1961. She became an inaugural member of the House of Ariki in 1967, and served as its vice-president during its first term. She served as President of the House of Ariki from 1978 to 1980, and again from 1990 to 1992.

Karika served as president of The Girl Guides Cook Islands Association for six years, and patroness of the Cook Islands National Council of Women. In 1996 she became a patroness of the Te Ipukarea Society. She was landowner of the Takitumu Conservation Area and committed to conservation, helping to transfer endangered Rarotonga monarch birds to Atiu in 2002, and leading protest marches against purse seining in 2016.

On her death in September 2017 she was given a state funeral. She was succeeded as Makea Karika Ariki by George Taripo Karika Ariki.

== Recognition ==
In 1977, she was awarded the Queen Elizabeth II Silver Jubilee Medal. She was made a Member of the Order of the British Empire in the 1993 New Year Honours, and promoted to Dame Commander of the Order of the British Empire in the 2012 New Year Honours.

In 2009, she was the inaugural winner of the Makona Aorangi environmental award for her life-long support for environmental causes.
