= Toka Hagai =

Cook Islands politician

- In office 19 September 2018 – 7 November 2018
- Deputy: Deputy Speaker of the Parliament of the Cook Islands
- Preceded by: Mona Ioane
- Succeeded by: Tai Tura

Member of the Cook Islands Parliament for Rakahanga
- In office 9 July 2014 – 14 June 2018
- Preceded by: Taunga Toka
- Succeeded by: Tina Browne

Personal details
- Party: Cook Islands Party

Toka Hagai is a Cook Islands politician and former member of the Cook Islands Parliament. He is a member of the Cook Islands Party.

Hagai stood unsuccessfully for Rakahanga at the 2010 Cook Islands general election. He was first elected to Parliament at the 2014 Cook Islands general election, and was appointed Government Whip. In 2016 he was part of the Cook Islands' delegation to the 2016 United Nations Climate Change Conference in Marrakesh, Morocco.

He was re-elected on the night at the 2018 election, but subsequently resigned following allegations of treating. His election was later declared void by the Court of Appeal, and his rival Tina Browne declared elected. Hagai was referred to the Police for bribery. while awaiting the outcome of the electoral petition against him Hagai had been elected Deputy speaker; he was replaced by Tai Tupa.

In early 2019 Prime Minister Henry Puna planned to install Hagai as a seventh, unelected, Cabinet Minister, but the appointment was delayed due to the police investigation into his electoral bribery.

In June 2019 it was reported that Hagai was occupying a government house in Rarotonga earmarked for low-income families and outer-island MPs.
