= 2006 Teenui-Mapumai by-election =

Election in the Cook Islands

The Teenui-Mapumai by-election was a by-election in the Cook Islands electorate of Teenui–Mapumai. It took place on 8 June 2006, and was precipitated by the retirement of Upoko Simpson.

The by-election was won by Speaker of the Cook Islands Parliament Norman George.
