= Ngatangiia (electorate) =

Electoral division in the Cook Islands

- Constituency for the Parliament of the Cook Islands
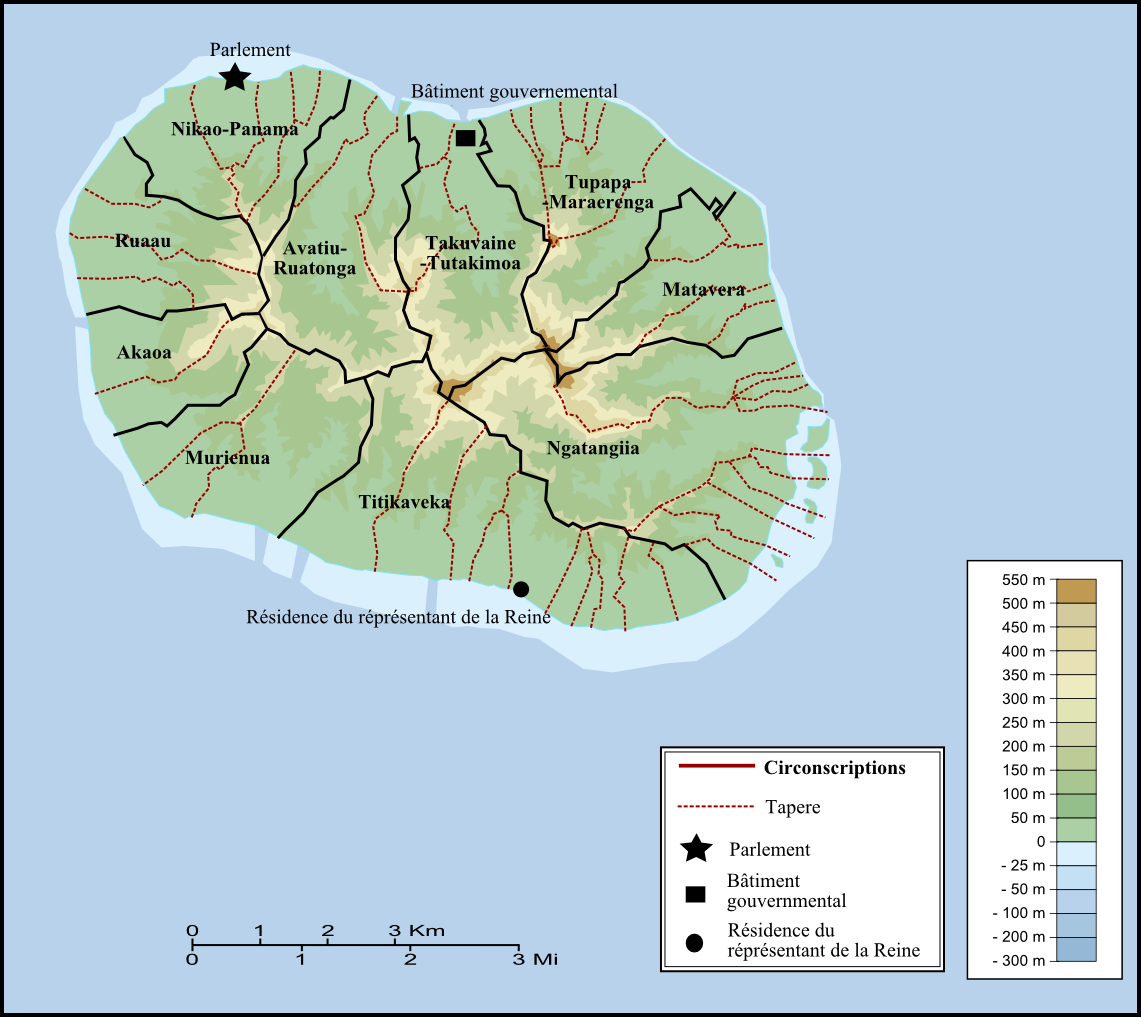
- Region: Rarotonga

Current constituency
- Created: 1981
- Number of members: 1
- Member: Tukaka Ama
- Created from: Takitumu

Ngatangiia is a Cook Islands electoral division returning one member to the Cook Islands Parliament.

The electorate was created in 1981, when the Constitution Amendment (No. 9) Act 1980–1981 adjusted electorate boundaries and split the electorate of Takitumu into three. It consists of the tapere of Turangi, Ngati Au, Ngati Maoate, Ngati Vaikai, Avana, Aroko, Nukupure (Muri), Areiti, Aremango, Vaii, and Maii on the island of Rarotonga.

== Members of Parliament ==
Election	Member	Party
1983 (Mar), 1983 (Nov), 1989, 1994, 1999, 2004, 2006	Terepai Maoate	Democratic Party
2010	Atatoa Herman	Cook Islands Party
2014, 2018	Tamaiva Tuavera	Democratic Party
2022, 2026	Tukaka Ama	Cook Islands Party

== Election results ==
2026 Cook Islands general election: Ngatangiia
Party	Candidate	Votes	%	±%
Cook Islands	Tukaka Ama^{†}	272	45.6	
Cook Islands United	Mapi Ioteva	241	40.4	
Democratic	Itinga Maoate	65	10.9	
Progressive	Christopher Robert Denny	18	3.0	
Turnout		596		
Cook Islands hold		Swing		
^{†} incumbent
