= Kitai Teinakore =

Cook Islands politician

Member of the Cook Islands Parliament for Vaipae–Tautu
- In office 14 June 2018 – 1 August 2022
- Preceded by: Mona Ioane
- Succeeded by: Teokotai Herman

Personal details
- Born: 23 October 1957 (age 68)
- Party: Cook Islands Democratic Party

Kitai Manuela Teinakore (born 23 October 1957) is a Cook Islands politician and former member of the Cook Islands Parliament. He is a member of the Cook Islands Democratic Party.

Teinakore was born on Aitutaki and educated at Araura School, Vaitau School, and Aitutaki Junior High School. He worked as a public servant for the Ministry of Agriculture. He was first elected at the 2018 Cook Islands general election, defeating the Cook Islands Party's Moana Ioane. In February 2020 he was appointed Democratic Party spokesperson for the Ombudsman, House of Ariki and the Koutu Nui.

He lost his seat in the 2022 Cook Islands general election.
