= Tekii Lazaro =

Cook Islands politician (1954–2020)

Member of the Cook Islands Parliament for Pukapuka–Nassau
- In office 7 June 2011 – 14 June 2018
- Preceded by: Vai Peua
- Succeeded by: Tingika Elikana

Personal details
- Born: 28 May 1954
- Died: 8 August 2020 (aged 66)
- Party: Cook Islands Party

Tekii Lazaro (28 May 1954 – 8 August 2020) was a Cook Islands politician and Member of the Cook Islands Parliament. He was a member of the Cook Islands Party.

Lazaro was educated at Niua school and Aitutaki High school, and studied to be a meteorologist in Fiji and New Zealand. He served for 35 years in the Cook Islands Police as a Meteorological Officer. He stood in the seat of Pukapuka–Nassau in the 2010 election, and narrowly won the seat on the night. A subsequent election petition found him guilty of bribery, and declared his election void. Lazaro contested and won the subsequent by-election.

In 2012 the Taxi Association complained that Lazaro was picking up tourists in an unlicensed taxi van. He was told to get an appropriate licence.

He was re-elected in the 2014 election, and appointed Associate Minister of Finance. He retired at the 2018 election and did not contest the seat.
