= 2014 Cook Islands general election =

- 9 July 2014
- All 24 seats in Parliament; 13 seats needed for a majority
- Turnout: 81.09%
Party	Leader	Vote %	Seats	+/–
Democratic	Wilkie Rasmussen	46.72	10	+2
Cook Islands	Henry Puna	41.82	12	−4
One Cook Islands	Teina Bishop	9.45	2	New
This lists parties that won seats. See the complete results below.
Prime Minister before	Prime Minister after election
Henry Puna; Cook Islands	Henry Puna; Cook Islands

General elections were held in the Cook Islands on 9 July 2014, determining the membership of the 16th Cook Islands Parliament.

The Cook Islands Party (CIP) initially appeared to have retained its majority, winning 13 seats, while the Democratic Party won eight and the new One Cook Islands Movement won two, with one seat tied. However, the result in one constituency the CIP had won was overturned in court, with the Democratic Party awarded the seat, while the tied seat was also awarded to the Democratic Party after one ballot was invalidated, resulting in a hung parliament.

== Background ==
The previous elections were held on 17 November 2010. The term of the Parliament was due to expire four years after that date, on 17 November 2014. Elections had to be held no later than three months after that date, with 17 February 2015 being the latest date.

However, on 17 April 2014 the Queen's Representative, Tom Marsters, dissolved Parliament, setting an election date of 9 July. Marsters stated that the Prime Minister, Henry Puna, had informed him that the early election was required in order to have a new government in office prior to the 50th anniversary of the Cook Islands attaining self-government, which will occur in 2015. Masters also said that it would allow the new government to pass a budget in time for the anniversary. Puna blamed minister Teina Bishop for destabilising the government and necessitating the election. Bishop resigned as education and tourism minister the day after the election was announced and subsequently left the Cook Islands Party to form a new party. The Opposition claimed that the Prime Minister had called the election to avoid a no-confidence vote in Parliament, which Puna denied. Leader of the Opposition Wilkie Rasmussen criticised Puna for calling an election with bills yet to complete their passage in Parliament.

A list of candidates was publicly notified on 6 May. 52 candidates contested the election, a decrease from 70 in 2010. Six candidates were women, with Alexis Wolfgramm of the Pan Pacific and Southeast Asia Women's Association blaming the snap election for the lack of more female candidates.

10,394 people were enrolled to vote.

== Electoral system ==
The 24 members of Parliament are elected in single-member constituencies using the first-past-the-post system.

== Campaign ==
The Cook Islands Party campaigned on its record in government, including increasing pensions, other welfare payments and the minimum wage. It also highlighted income tax reductions, while the opposition Democratic Party criticised the government's value-added tax (VAT) increase and promised to reverse it. The Democratic Party also promoted a scheme for agricultural development on the outer islands, while the Cook Islands Party touted the infrastructure projects it had carried out in the outer islands. Bishop's new party, the One Cook Islands Movement, called for the taxation of pensions to be abolished and for subsidies to promote tourism in the outer islands. Both major parties, as well as independent candidates, used social media in an attempt to connect with younger voters. Former MP Iaveta Short criticised the campaign, saying parties were focused on "offering lollies to get votes" rather than providing solutions to the issues faced by the Cook Islands.

== Results ==
There was a tie in Mitiaro, resulting in a by-election later in the year. However, before the by-election results were counted, a recount took place of the general election results after one voter's ballot was invalidated and the seat was awarded to Tangata Vavia of the Democratic Party, who won by a margin of 50–49.

Party	Votes	%	Seats	+/–
Democratic Party	3,907	46.72	10	+2
Cook Islands Party	3,497	41.82	12	–4
One Cook Islands Movement	790	9.45	2	New
Titikaveka Oire	96	1.15	0	New
Independents	73	0.87	0	0
Total	8,363	100.00	24	0
Valid votes	8,363	99.23		
Invalid/blank votes	65	0.77		
Total votes	8,428	100.00		
Registered voters/turnout	10,394	81.09		
Source: MFEM, MFEM

=== By constituency ===
Akaoa
Party	Candidate	Votes	%	±%
Cook Islands	Teariki Heather	201	52.1	
Democratic	Nooroa O Teariki Baker	185	47.9	
Turnout		386		
Cook Islands hold		Swing		

Amuri-Ureia
Party	Candidate	Votes	%	±%
Cook Islands	Toanui Isamaela	203	57.8	
Democratic	Terepai Maoate Jnr	148	42.2	
Turnout		351		
Cook Islands hold		Swing		

Arutanga-Reureu-Nikaupara
Party	Candidate	Votes	%	±%
One Cook Islands	Teina Bishop	204	68.2	
Democratic	Teuira Manuela Ka	95	31.8	
Turnout		299		
One Cook Islands gain from Cook Islands		Swing		

Avatiu-Ruatonga-Palmerston
Party	Candidate	Votes	%	±%
Democratic	Albert Taaviri Kaitara Nicholas	292	53.1	
Cook Islands	John Henry	258	46.9	
Turnout		550		
Democratic gain from Cook Islands		Swing		

Ivirua
Party	Candidate	Votes	%	±%
Democratic	Jim Marurai	Elected unopposed		
Turnout				
Democratic hold		Swing		

Manihiki
Party	Candidate	Votes	%	±%
Cook Islands	Henry Puna	78	51.3	
Democratic	Apii Piho	74	48.7	
Turnout		152		
Cook Islands hold		Swing		

Matavera
Party	Candidate	Votes	%	±%
Cook Islands	Kiriau Turepu	288	51.2	
Democratic	Cassey Eggelton	275	48.8	
Turnout		563		
Cook Islands hold		Swing		

Mauke
Party	Candidate	Votes	%	±%
Cook Islands	Tai Tura	82	42.5	
One Cook Islands	Tungane Williams	63	32.6	
Democratic	Hugh Graham	48	24.9	
Turnout		193		
Cook Islands hold		Swing		

Mitiaro
Party	Candidate	Votes	%	±%
Democratic	Tangata Vavia	50	50.5	
Cook Islands	Tuakeu Tangatapoto	49	49.5	
Turnout		99		

Murienua
Party	Candidate	Votes	%	±%
Democratic	James Beer	225	50.4	
Cook Islands	Patrick Arioka	221	49.6	
Turnout		446		
Democratic hold		Swing		

Ngatangiia
Party	Candidate	Votes	%	±%
Democratic	Tamaiva Tuavera	257	50.1	
Cook Islands	Atatoa Herman	183	35.7	
Independent	Ngateina Jasmine Mackenzie	73	14.2	
Turnout		513		
Democratic gain from Cook Islands		Swing		

Nikao-Panama
Party	Candidate	Votes	%	±%
Democratic	Ngamau Munokoa	415	64.1	
Cook Islands	Piritau Nga	234	35.9	
Turnout		651		
Democratic hold		Swing		

Oneroa
Party	Candidate	Votes	%	±%
Democratic	Kareroa Wesley	117	63.6	
Cook Islands	Poroaiti Arokapiti	67	36.4	
Turnout		184		
Democratic hold		Swing		

Penrhyn
Party	Candidate	Votes	%	±%
Cook Islands	Willie John	78	53.4	
Democratic	Wilkie Rasmussen	68	46.6	
Turnout		146		
Cook Islands gain from Democratic		Swing		

Pukapuka-Nassau
Party	Candidate	Votes	%	±%
Cook Islands	Tekii Lazaro	128	46.9	
Democratic	Vai Peua	120	44.0	
One Cook Islands	Tai Ravarua	25	9.2	
Turnout		273		
Cook Islands hold		Swing		

Rakahanga
Party	Candidate	Votes	%	±%
Cook Islands	Toka Hagai	39	63.9	
Democratic	Taunga Toka	22	36.1	
Turnout		61		
Cook Islands gain from Democratic		Swing		

Ruaau
Party	Candidate	Votes	%	±%
Democratic	William William Heather	386	61.1	
Cook Islands	David Akanoa	246	38.9	
Turnout		632		
Democratic hold		Swing		

Takuvaine-Tutakimoa
Party	Candidate	Votes	%	±%
Cook Islands	Mark Brown	313	63.9	
Democratic	Tuaputa Petero Dyer	177	36.1	
Turnout		490		
Cook Islands hold		Swing		

Tamarua
Party	Candidate	Votes	%	±%
Democratic	Tetangi Matapo	30	52.6	
Cook Islands	Tokorua Pareina	27	47.4	
Turnout		57		
Democratic gain from Cook Islands		Swing		

Teenui-Mapumai
Party	Candidate	Votes	%	±%
Cook Islands	Rose Toki-Brown	71	54.6	
Democratic	Norman George	59	45.4	
Turnout		130		
Cook Islands gain from Independent		Swing		

Tengatangi-Areora-Ngatiarua
Party	Candidate	Votes	%	±%
Cook Islands	Nandi Glassie	88	54.7	
Democratic	Eugene Tatuava	73	45.3	
Turnout		161		
Cook Islands hold		Swing		

Titikaveka
Party	Candidate	Votes	%	±%
Democratic	Selina Napa	337	48.1	
Cook Islands	Teariki Matenga	268	38.2	
Titikaveka Oire	Teava Iro	96	13.7	
Turnout		701		
Democratic hold		Swing		

Tupapa-Maraerenga
Party	Candidate	Votes	%	±%
One Cook Islands	George Angene	498	51.0	
Democratic	Lee Harmon	282	28.9	
Cook Islands	Isaia Willie Jnr	197	20.2	
Turnout		977		
One Cook Islands gain from Cook Islands		Swing		

Vaipae-Tautu
Party	Candidate	Votes	%	±%
Cook Islands	Mona Ioane	178	50.9	
Democratic	Kete Ioane	172	49.1	
Turnout		350		
Cook Islands hold		Swing		

== Analysis and reactions ==
The Cook Islands Party, despite winning fewer votes than the Democratic Party, retained its majority with 13 seats. The Democratic Party won eight seats and the newly formed One Cook Islands Movement two. One seat, Mitiaro, was tied, with a recount to be held there.

Preliminary results had given the Democratic Party 11 seats to the Cook Islands Party's 10, with two for the One Cook Islands Movement and one tied. They had also had Prime Minister Henry Puna trailing his Democratic Party opponent by two votes in Manihiki. However, the final results gave Puna a four-vote victory, while Democratic Party leader Wilkie Rasmussen, who had led by eight votes in the preliminary results, lost by 10 votes to the Cook Islands Party's Willie John in Penrhyn. Tokorua Pareina of the Cook Islands Party also defeated the Democratic Party's Tetangi Matapo by one vote in Tamarua, which had been tied in the preliminary results. Mitiaro, where the Democratic Party's Tangata Vavia had held a six-vote lead in the preliminary tallies, became in a tie in the final results.

One Cook Islands Movement leader Teina Bishop was re-elected in Arutanga-Reureu-Nikaupara, as was the party's other MP, George Angene, in Tupapa-Maraerenga.

In a major upset, Cook Islands Party candidate Rose Toki-Brown ousted veteran Democratic Party MP Norman George by 12 votes in Teenui-Mapumai. However, George claimed that his defeat was result of widespread bribery and said he would challenge it in court. Toki-Brown denied any wrongdoing. George stated that his party colleague Eugene Tatuava was also planning to challenge the result in Tengatangi-Areora-Ngatiarua, where he lost to Cook Islands Party MP Nandi Glassie by 15 votes.

Bishop questioned the validity of postal votes from New Zealand that arrived two days after election day, saying that this delay meant that they appeared to breach the Electoral Act. Chief Electoral Officer Taggy Tangimetua dismissed the issue as a "technicality", stating that she had received legal advice that she could count the votes and adding that the Electoral Act needed to be reformed to address impractical provisions.

Preliminary figures indicated that turnout had declined to 73.3%, but this increased to 79% in the final results. Democratic Party MP Selina Napa, who was re-elected in Titikaveka, claimed that the figures were skewed by outdated voter rolls that still listed people who had died or moved away. She was supported by Tangimetua, who noted that the rolls were supposed to be updated by the Ministry of Justice.

The Democratic Party questioned the accuracy of the count, with its president, Sean Willis, saying:

There are a lot of question marks hanging around about why a lot of Democratic votes by declaration were disallowed which were crucial in some outer island seats. There were postal votes that were accepted after the polling date. Basically we've lost the battle but we haven't lost the war. There are definitely going to be petitions.

The final results included an extra 1236 votes compared to the preliminary results. Earlier comments by Tangimetua had indicated that, in addition to the votes included in the preliminary count, the final count would include about 400 advance votes, between 100 and 300 postal votes, and 100 votes by declaration. The appearance of several hundred votes additional to those mentioned by the Chief Electoral Officer in the final count led to public concern and questions about where they had come from. An anonymous party official also alleged that a scrutineer had reported seeing ballot boxes being opened before the count started.

== Aftermath ==
In September the High Court upheld an electoral petition submitted by the Democratic Party regarding the result in Tamarua, where Cook Islands Party candidate Tokorua Pareina had won by a single result. As a result of the court ruling, Democratic Party candidate Tetangi Matapo was declared the winner by three votes. This resulted in the Cook Islands Party losing its one-seat majority.

On 17 December 2014, the Court of Appeal voided the election of Cook Islands Party candidate (and Education Minister) Mona Ioane in Vaipae-Tautu, and ordered a by-election for 17 February. This ruling reduced the Puna government to the status of a minority government.
