= 2010 Cook Islands Member of Parliament reduction referendum =

- 17 November 2010
- Should there be a reduction in the number of Members of Parliament?
- Outcome: Proposal failed as two-thirds quorum not reached

Results
Choice	Votes	%
Yes	4,983	63.84%
No	2,822	36.16%
Valid votes	7,805	92.61%
Invalid or blank votes	623	7.39%
Total votes	8,428	100.00%
Registered voters/turnout	10,500	80.27%

A referendum on reducing the number of MPs was held in the Cook Islands on 17 November 2010, alongside the general elections. Although 64% of voters voted in favour, the proposal failed as it required two-third of voters to vote in favour.

== Opinion polls ==
According to a poll published by the Cook Islands News on 11 September 2010, 76% of respondents supported the referendum proposal. A number of politicians publicly stated their support for the referendum proposal, including Democratic Party Leader Robert Wigmore and Cook Islands Party deputy leader Teina Bishop.

== Results ==
Choice	Votes	%
For	4,983	63.84
Against	2,822	36.16
Total	7,805	100.00
Valid votes	7,805	92.61
Invalid/blank votes	623	7.39
Total votes	8,428	100.00
Registered voters/turnout	10,500	80.27
Source: PINA
