= Maria Heather =

New Zealand politician (died 2003)

Maria Tapuanoa Heather (died June 2003) was a Cook Islands politician and Member of the Cook Islands Parliament. She was a member of the Cook Islands Democratic Party.

Heather was first elected to Parliament for the seat of Rua'au in the 1999 election. She served as Leader of the House and Parliamentary Undersecretary to the Minister of Internal Affairs and Works. Her death in June 2003 precipitated the 2003 Rua'au by-election. She was succeeded in the seat by her husband, Geoffrey Heather.
