= Tuakeu Tangatapoto =

Cook Islands politician

Deputy Speaker of the Parliament of the Cook Islands
- Incumbent
- Assumed office 9 February 2024
- Preceded by: Tai Tura

Member of the Cook Islands Parliament for Mitiaro
- Incumbent
- Assumed office 14 June 2018
- Preceded by: Tangata Vavia

Personal details
- Born: 4 February 1970 (age 56)
- Party: Cook Islands Party

Tuakeu Tangatapoto (born 4 February 1970) is a Cook Islands politician and member of the Cook Islands Parliament. He is a member of the Cook Islands Party.

Tangatapoto is from Mangaia and was educated at Mitiaro School, Tereora College, and the University of the South Pacific. He worked as a government builder, acting Island secretary for Mitiaro, and as chief executive of Mitiaro's island government.

He contested the seat of Mitiaro in the 2014 election, and gained an exact tie with his rival Tangata Vavia. The tie was confirmed by a recount, and a by-election called, but the count was delayed by a court order. The court found that one person had voted illegally in the general election, and as a result Vavia was declared the winner and the by-election votes discarded without being counted. Tangatapoto subsequently defeated Vavia in the 2018 election.

He was re-elected at the 2022 Cook Islands general election. In February 2024, Tangatapoto was appointed Deputy Speaker of the Cook Islands Parliament.

Tangatapoto won re-election at the 2026 general election.
