= March 2019 Tengatangi-Areora-Ngatiarua by-election =

Election in the Cook Islands

- 18 March 2019

Constituency of Tengatangi–Areora–Ngatiarua
- Turnout: 99.2%
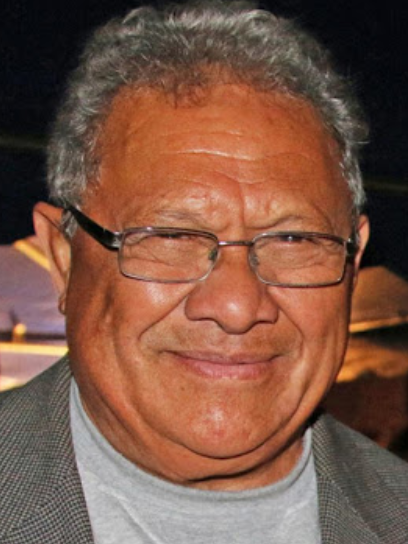
	First party	Second party
	Ind.
Candidate	Te-Hani Brown	Nandi Glassie
Party	Independent	Democratic
Popular vote	80	50
Percentage	61.54%	38.46%
MP before election
Te-Hani Brown
Democratic
Elected MP
Te-Hani Brown
Independent

A by-election was held in the Cook Islands constituency of Tengatangi-Areora-Ngatiarua on 18 March 2019. The by-election was called following the defection of sitting MP Te-Hani Brown from the Democratic Party in January in order to support the government of Henry Puna, which triggered a by-election under election law. Brown ran as an independent with the support of the Cook Islands Party against Nandi Glassie, whom Brown had beaten in the 2018 Cook Islands general election.

== Results ==
Candidate	Party	Votes	%
Te-Hani Brown	Independent	80	61.54
Nandi Glassie	Democratic Party	50	38.46
Total		130	100.00

== Aftermath ==
Although Brown retained her seat, Glassie filed a petition against her victory. He alleged that she had effectively bribed voters by covering the charge of a private aircraft to carry voters to vote on Atiu; Brown maintained that this did not constitute an offence. Brown resigned in April 2019 during the process of the petition through the courts and although Glassie was allowed to challenge the election result, this was reversed on appeal. Brown's seat was declared vacant in September 2019, triggering another by-election.
