= Tukaka Ama =

Cook Islands politician

Member of the Cook Islands Parliament for Ngatangiia
- Incumbent
- Assumed office 1 August 2022
- Preceded by: Tamaiva Tuavera

Personal details
- Party: Cook Islands Party

Tukaka "Kaka" George Tamarua Ama is a Cook Islands politician and member of the Cook Islands Parliament. He is a member of the Cook Islands Party. He is the brother of MP Akaiti Puna.

Ama is from Ngatangiia on Rarotonga. He previously worked as a public servant for the Ministry of Foreign Affairs and Immigration.

He stood for election at the 2018 Cook Islands general election as a Cook Islands Party candidate, losing to the Democrats' Tamaiva Tuavera. As a candidate he advocated for higher wages and lower interest rates. He stood again at the 2022 Cook Islands general election and was elected.

Ama won re-election at the 2026 general election.
