= Amuri, Cook Islands =

Coordinates: 18°52′0″S 159°46′0″W

Amuri is a town on Aitutaki in the Cook Islands, situated at 18°52'0S 159°46'0W. By population, it is the second-largest settlement, after the capital, Avarua, in the Cook Islands.
