= Tetangi Matapo =

Cook Islands politician (born 1965)

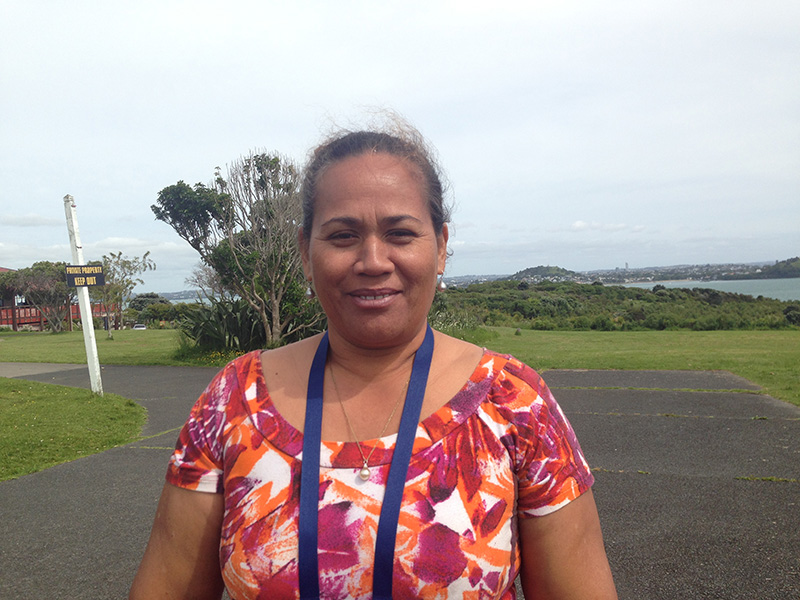
- Tetangi Matapo in 2016

Member of the Cook Islands Parliament for Tamarua
- Incumbent
- Assumed office 29 January 2013
- Preceded by: Pukeiti Pukeiti

Personal details
- Born: 3 October 1965 (age 60)
- Party: Cook Islands Democratic Party; Independent

Tetangi Matapo (born 3 October 1965) is a Cook Islands politician and member of the Cook Islands Parliament. She is an independent politician, having previously been a member of the Cook Islands Democratic Party.

Matapo was born on Mangaia and educated at Mangaia School and Mangaia College. She studied to be a teacher at the University of the South Pacific, graduating with a Bachelor of Education and a Masters of Education. She worked as a teacher and later deputy principal at Mangaia School. She was elected to Parliament in the 2013 Tamarua by-election. In April 2013 she attended the inaugural Pacific Parliamentary Forum in Wellington, New Zealand.

At the 2014 election, she lost the seat on the night to the Cook Islands Party's Tokorua Pareina, but regained it in an electoral petition. In 2015, she was appointed opposition spokesperson for Education and Internal Affairs. In 2016, she was part of the Cook Islands' delegation to the second Pacific Parliamentary Forum.

She was re-elected at the 2018 election. Shortly after the election she was sent to the 2018 Presiding Officers and Clerks Conference in Wellington as "interim Deputy Speaker", despite there having been no election for the position. In December 2019 she was part of a protest by women MPs to permit the wearing of ei katu (floral crowns) in Parliament. In February 2020 she was appointed Democratic Party spokesperson for Business, Trade and Investment Board, Education and Justice.

She was re-elected at the 2022 Cook Islands general election. In the 2026 general election, Matapo retained her seat running as an independent candidate.
