= Te-Hani Brown =

Cook Islands politician

Member of the Cook Islands Parliament for Tengatangi–Areora–Ngatiarua
- Incumbent
- Assumed office 14 June 2018
- Preceded by: Nandi Glassie

Personal details
- Born: 16 March 1996 (age 30) Rarotonga, Cook Islands
- Party: Independent

Te-Hani Rose Alexandra Brown (born 16 March 1996) is a Cook Islands politician and member of the Cook Islands Parliament. She is an independent.

== Career ==
Te-Hani Brown was born in 1996 in Rarotonga, Cook Islands. Brown is the daughter of MP Rose Toki-Brown. She was first elected to parliament as a candidate for the Cook Islands Democratic Party in the 2018 election, defeating her predecessor Nandi Glassie. At age 22, she was the youngest MP in the Pacific region.

In January 2019 Brown resigned from the Democratic party to support the government of Henry Puna. Anti-party hopping laws forced her to resign from parliament. She contested the subsequent by-election as an independent, and was re-elected, but resigned the seat again just two weeks later when an electoral petition was filed. She contested a second by-election in November 2019 and was re-elected for a third time.

Following the election of Mark Brown as Prime Minister she was appointed Associate Minister of Internal Affairs and Health.

She was re-elected at the 2022 Cook Islands general election and continued her support for Mark Brown. Brown won re-election at the 2026 general election.
