= Mitiaro (electorate) =

Electoral division of the Cook Islands

- Constituency for the Parliament of the Cook Islands
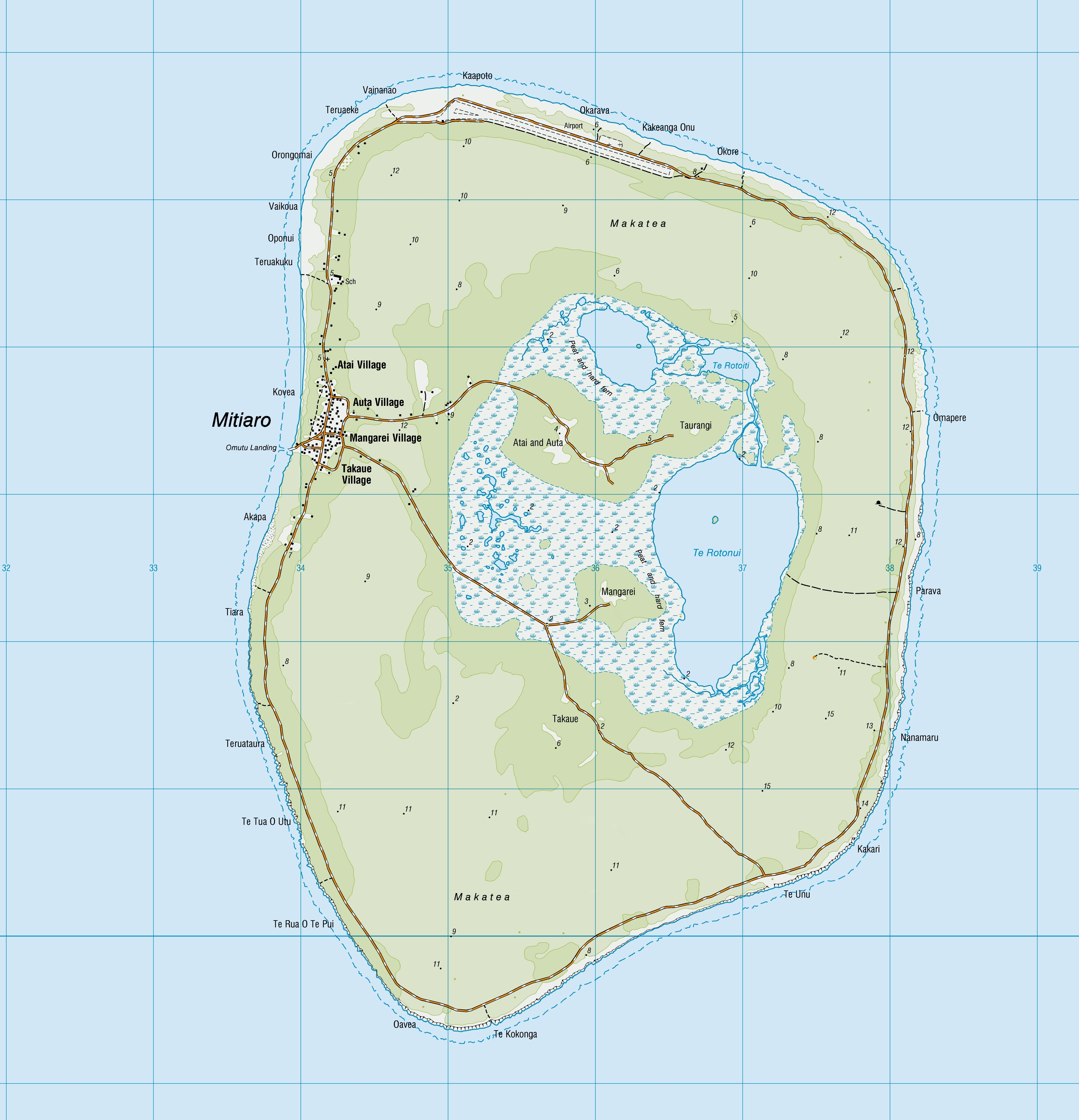
- Region: Outer Islands

Current constituency
- Number of members: 1
- Member: Tuakeu Tangatapoto

Mitiaro is a Cook Islands electoral division returning one member to the Cook Islands Parliament. Its current representative is Tuakeu Tangatapoto, who has held the seat since 2026.

The electorate consists of the island of Mitiaro.

== Members of Parliament for Mitiaro ==
Unless otherwise stated, all MPs terms began and ended at general elections.

Name	Party	Elected	Left Office	Reason
Tangata Vavia	Democratic Party	1994, 1999, 2004, 2006, 2010, 2014	2018	Defeated
Tuakeu Tangatapoto	Cook Islands Party	2018, 2022, 2026	incumbent	

== Election results ==
=== 2026 election ===
2026 Cook Islands general election: Mitiaro
Party	Candidate	Votes	%	±%
Cook Islands	Tuakeu Tangatapoto^{†}	60	61.9	
Cook Islands United	Makara Murare	35	36.1	
Democratic	Paul Raui Pokoati Allsworth	2	2.1	
Turnout		97		
Cook Islands hold		Swing		
^{†} incumbent

=== 2006 election ===
Cook Islands general election, 2006: Mitiaro
Party	Candidate	Votes	%	±%
Democratic	Tangata Vavia	65	58.0	
Cook Islands	Travel Tou Ariki	47	42.0	
Turnout		112	94.1	

=== 2004 election ===
Cook Islands general election, 2004: Mitiaro
Party	Candidate	Votes	%	±%
Democratic	Tangata Vavia	65	52.4	
Cook Islands	Travel Tou Ariki	59	47.6	
Turnout		124	96.9	
