= Rose Toki-Brown =

Cook Islands politician

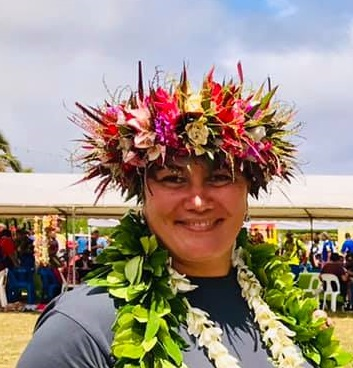
- Rose Toki-Brown in October 2020

Minister of Internal Affairs
- Incumbent
- Assumed office 2 June 2021
- Prime Minister: Mark Brown
- Preceded by: Vaine Mokoroa

Minister of Health
- Incumbent
- Assumed office 10 July 2018
- Prime Minister: Henry Puna; Mark Brown
- Preceded by: Nandi Glassie

Minister of Justice
- In office 10 July 2018 – 2 June 2021
- Prime Minister: Henry Puna; Mark Brown
- Preceded by: Nandi Glassie
- Succeeded by: Vaine Mokoroa

Deputy Speaker of the Parliament of the Cook Islands
- In office 15 October 2014 – 16 September 2016
- Preceded by: Tai Tura
- Succeeded by: Mona Ioane

Member of the Cook Islands Parliament for Teenui–Mapumai
- Incumbent
- Assumed office 9 July 2014
- Preceded by: Norman George

Personal details
- Born: 7 December 1976 (age 49) Areora
- Party: Cook Islands Party; Independent

Vainetutai Rose Toki-Brown (born 7 December 1976) is a Cook Islands politician, and Cabinet Minister. In July 2016 she became the Cook Islands' first female Leader of the Opposition.

== Career ==
Toki-Brown was born in Areora on Atiu. She was a businesswoman and ran the 24 hours Super Brown Mega Store with her husband. She is the mother of fellow MP Te-Hani Brown.

Toki-Brown ran in the 2014 election as a candidate for the Cook Islands Party, defeating her uncle Norman George to win the Teenui–Mapumai seat. An election petition by George was subsequently dismissed. She was appointed Deputy Speaker in October 2014, following then-opposition leader Teina Bishop's conviction for corruption in September 2016 (she resigned as Deputy Speaker after she was unanimously elected leader of the Opposition). Toki-Brown was replaced as Deputy Speaker by Mona Ioane.

In June 2017 Toki-Brown rejoined the Cook Islands Party after being replaced by William (Smiley) Heather as leader of the opposition. While originally planning to run for the CIP in the 2018 election, she became an independent after pressure was put on her over her daughter running for the rival Cook Islands Democratic Party. She was elected, defeating both Democratic and Cook Islands Party candidates. Following the election she backed the Cook Islands Party government and was appointed to Cabinet as Minister of Health, Justice, Parliamentary Services and Agriculture. In July 2019 she briefly served as Acting Prime Minister, the first woman to do so.

In the Cabinet reshuffle following the appointment of Mark Brown as Prime Minister she retained all of her Cabinet portfolios. A second reshuffle in June 2021 saw her switch her Justice portfolio for Internal Affairs.

She was re-elected at the 2022 Cook Islands general election and continued her support for Mark Brown. Toki-Brown won re-election at the 2026 general election.
