= Ngamau Munokoa =

Cook Islands politician

Ngamau Munokoa OBE

11th Deputy Prime Minister of the Cook Islands
- In office 5 November 2003 – 19 November 2004
- Representative: Frederick Tutu Goodwin
- Prime Minister: Robert Woonton
- Preceded by: Terepai Maoate
- Succeeded by: Geoffrey Henry

Minister for the Environment
- In office 31 July 2009 – 23 December 2009
- Prime Minister: Jim Marurai
- Preceded by: Kete Ioane
- Succeeded by: Jim Marurai

Minister of Internal Affairs
- In office 17 October 2008 – 23 December 2009
- Succeeded by: Apii Piho
- In office 1 December 1999 – 12 February 2002
- Prime Minister: Terepai Maoate
- Preceded by: Tupou Faireka
- Succeeded by: Peri Vaevae Pare

Minister of Agriculture
- In office 15 September 2005 – 31 July 2009
- Preceded by: Tupou Faireka
- Succeeded by: Robert Wigmore

Minister of Justice
- In office 15 September 2005 – 17 October 2008
- Preceded by: Tupou Faireka
- Succeeded by: Kete Ioane

Minister of Works
- In office 1 December 1999 – 12 February 2002
- Prime Minister: Terepai Maoate
- Preceded by: Tupou Faireka
- Succeeded by: Tom Marsters

Member of the Cook Islands Parliament for Nikao–Panama
- In office July 1996 – 14 June 2018
- Preceded by: Niroa Manuela
- Succeeded by: Vaine Mokoroa

Personal details
- Born: 13 August 1944 (age 81) Rarotonga
- Party: Cook Islands Democratic Party

Ngamau Mere Munokoa OBE (born 13 August 1944), also known as "Aunty Mau", is a Cook Islands politician and former Cabinet Minister. She was the third woman ever elected to the Cook Islands Parliament, the second appointed to Cabinet, and the first to hold the post of Cook Islands Deputy Prime Minister. She is a member of the Cook Islands Democratic Party.

== Early life ==
Munokoa was born in Rarotonga and attended Arorangi, Avarua and Nikao Primary schools and Tereora College. She trained for clerical work in Auckland, New Zealand in the hope of becoming a teacher, but returned to the Cook Islands in 1962 to open a shop.

== Political career ==
Munokoa first ran for Parliament in 1994, but was unsuccessful. She was elected in the 1996 Nikao–Panama by-election, defeating then-Cook Islands Party candidate Tina Browne. In 1999 she was appointed as Minister of Internal Affairs and Works in the Cabinet of Sir Terepai Maoate. She later served in the Cabinet of Robert Woonton, and in 2003 was appointed Deputy Prime Minister, becoming the first Cook Islands woman to hold the position. She later resigned from Woonton's Cabinet following his decision to form a coalition with the rival Cook Islands Party, but was reappointed in 2005 by Jim Marurai. She continued to serve in Cabinet, holding various portfolios, until December 2009, when she resigned over the sacking of Democratic Party leader Terepai Maoate.

She was re-elected at the 2010 election, and again in 2014. She failed to be re-elected in the 2018 election, losing to Vaine Mokoroa. Her 22-year career made her the longest-serving female MP.

== Recognition ==
Munokoa was appointed Officer of the Order of the British Empire (OBE) in the 2010 New Year Honours. In October 2019, she was inducted into the hall of fame at the inaugural Vaine Rangatira awards for Cook Islands women.
