= Teenui–Mapumai =

Cook Islands electoral division

- Constituency for the Parliament of the Cook Islands
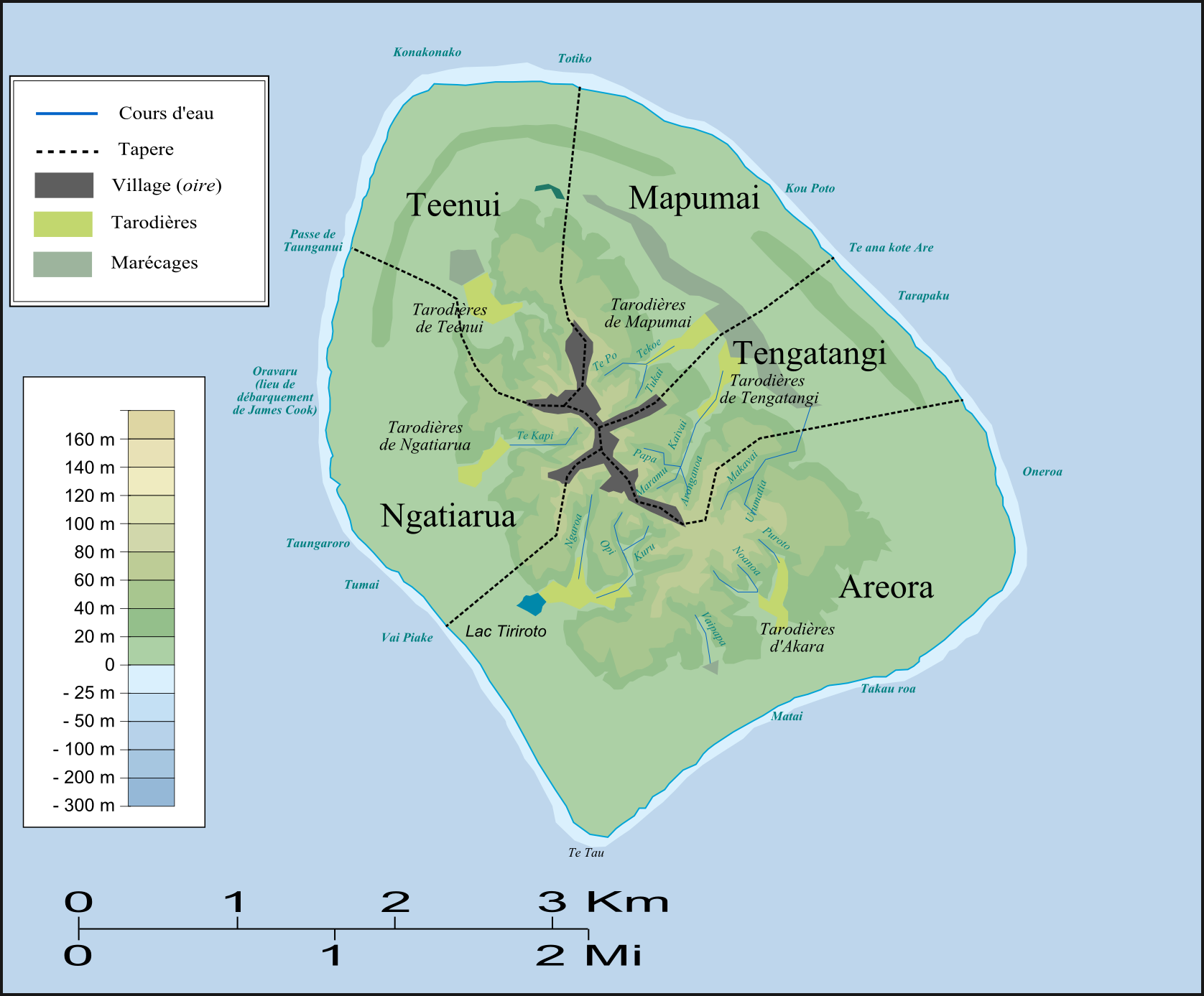
- Region: Atiu

Current constituency
- Created: 1981
- Number of members: 1
- Member: Rose Toki-Brown
- Created from: Atiu

Teenui–Mapumai is a Cook Islands electoral division returning one member to the Cook Islands Parliament.

The electorate was created in 1981, when the Constitution Amendment (No. 9) Act 1980 adjusted electorate boundaries and split the multi-member electorate of Atiu into two separate constituencies.

== Members of Parliament for Teenui–Mapumai ==
Unless otherwise stated, all MPs terms began and ended at general elections.

Election	Member	Party
1994, 1999, 2004	Upokomaki Simpson	Democratic Party
	Upokomaki Simpson	Cook Islands First Party
2006 by-election	Norman George	Independent
2006, 2010	Norman George	Cook Islands Party
	Norman George	Independent
2014	Rose Toki-Brown	Cook Islands Party
2018, 2022, 2026	Rose Toki-Brown	Independent

== Election results ==
=== 2026 election ===
2026 Cook Islands general election: Teenui–Mapumai
Party	Candidate	Votes	%	±%
Independent-Enuamanu	Rose Toki-Brown^{†}	81	77.9	
Independent	Charles Amaru Koronui	23	22.1	
Turnout		104		
Independent hold		Swing		
^{†} incumbent

=== 2014 election ===
Cook Islands general election, 2014: Teenui-Mapumai
Party	Candidate	Votes	%	±%
Cook Islands	Rose Toki-Brown	71	54.6	
Democratic	Norman George	59	45.4	
Turnout		130		
Cook Islands gain from Independent		Swing		

=== 2010 election ===
Cook Islands general election, 2010: Teenui-Mapumai
Party	Candidate	Votes	%	±%
Cook Islands	Norman George	75	70.8	
Democratic	Ngametua Pukeiti	31	29.2	
Turnout		106		

=== 2006 election ===
Cook Islands general election, 2006: Teenui-Mapumai
Party	Candidate	Votes	%	±%
Cook Islands	Norman George	85	63.0	
Democratic	Nellie Mokoroa	50	37.0	
Turnout		135	92.5	

=== 2004 election ===
Cook Islands general election, 2004: Teenui-Mapumai
Party	Candidate	Votes	%	±%
Democratic	Upokomaki Simpson	71	54.6	
Cook Islands	Tangaina Tanga	59	45.4	
Turnout		130	92.2	
