= 2003 Rua'au by-election =

Election in the Cook Islands

The Rua'au by-election was a by-election in the Cook Islands seat of Rua'au. It took place on 14 August 2003, and was precipitated by the death of Democratic Party MP Maria Heather.

Three candidates contested the by-election: the Democratic Party's Geoffrey Heather, husband of the former MP; the Cook Islands Party's Vaine Wichman, and Cook Islands National Party leader Teariki Heather. The poll was won by Geoffrey Heather.

== Results ==
Candidate	Party	Votes	%
Geoffrey Heather	Democratic Party	231	42.54
Teariki Heather	Cook Islands National Party	157	28.91
Vaine Wichman	Cook Islands Party	155	28.55
Total		543	100.00
Source: The Cook Islands Gazette
