= Teariki Heather =

Cook Islands politician

14th Deputy Prime Minister of the Cook Islands
- In office 11 December 2013 – 14 June 2018
- Prime Minister: Henry Puna
- Preceded by: Tom Marsters
- Succeeded by: Mark Brown

Minister of Police
- In office 17 April 2012 – 14 June 2018
- Preceded by: Henry Puna
- Succeeded by: Vaine Mokoroa

Minister of Justice
- In office 3 November 2013 – 15 March 2015
- Preceded by: Henry Puna
- Succeeded by: Nandi Glassie

Minister of Infrastructure & Planning
- In office 3 December 2010 – 14 June 2018
- Preceded by: William (Smiley) Heather
- Succeeded by: Robert Tapaitau

Member of the Cook Islands Parliament for Murienua
- Incumbent
- Assumed office 1 August 2022
- Preceded by: Patrick Arioka

Member of the Cook Islands Parliament for Akaoa
- In office 7 September 2004 – 14 June 2018
- Preceded by: Teremoana Tapi Taio
- Succeeded by: Nooroa o Teariki Baker

Personal details
- Born: 30 June 1959 (age 67) Rarotonga, Cook Islands
- Party: Cook Islands Party; Cook Islands United Party

Teariki William Heather (born 30 July 1959) is a Cook Islands politician and former Cabinet minister who served as Deputy Prime Minister of the Cook Islands from 2013 to 2018. Previously a member of the Cook Islands Party, he is now the leader of the Cook Islands United Party.

== Early life ==
Heather was born on Rarotonga and educated at Arorangi Primary school and Tereora College. He is the younger brother of Democratic Party MP William (Smiley) Heather. He was a businessman before entering politics.

== Political career ==
In March 2003 Heather founded the Cook Islands National Party with the aim of securing political reform, including a shorter Parliamentary term. The party launched a high-profile court case against MPs Norman George and Paora Teiti in an effort to have them unseated for performing consultancy work for the government, which was seen as making them public servants and thus ineligible to hold office, but the case was unsuccessful. Heather contested the 2003 Rua'au by-election as a National Party candidate, but was unsuccessful. He subsequently disbanded the party and joined the Cook Islands Party.

In the 2004 elections Heather entered Parliament after winning the seat of Akaoa. The 2006 election produced a tie in the seat, forcing a by-election which Heather won.

== Cabinet ==
At the 2010 election Heather was re-elected and was one of four candidates for the post of Deputy Prime Minister. He did not gain that position, but was appointed to Cabinet as Minister of Infrastructure & Planning. Shortly after his appointment he was warned by the Public Service Commissioner about attempting to privately employ a new Head of Ministry in violation of the Public Service Act. In April 2012 he was appointed Minister of Police. Shortly afterwards he was accused of corruption over the allocation of government contracts to his family business. Later that year he suggested amending the law to allow parents to smack their children. A Cabinet reshuffle in November 2013 saw him pick up the Justice portfolio. In December 2013 he was appointed Deputy Prime Minister, filling the vacancy created by the resignation of Tom Marsters.

Heather was re-elected at the 2014 election. A further Cabinet reshuffle in March 2015 saw him yield the Justice portfolio to Nandi Glassie.

In February 2016 news emerged that Heather was being investigated for corruption by the Financial Intelligence Unit. Prime Minister Henry Puna refused to suspend him.

Heather was not re-elected at the 2018 election, losing to Nooroa o Teariki Baker.

== United party ==
Following his election loss Heather founded the Cook Islands United Party with former MP Nandi Glassie. He subsequently contested the 2019 Ivirua by-election but was unsuccessful. In the 2022 election he contested the seat of Murienua, promising that it would be his last term in parliament if elected. He was elected along with two other United party MP's.

In early February 2025, Heather voiced opposition to Prime Minister Mark Brown's abortive Cook Islands passport proposal and a partnership agreement with China. In response, Heather said he would organise a protest rally expressing support for New Zealand to coincide with the opening of the Cook Islands Parliament on 17 February. This rally was attended by 400 people including Heather and Te Pāti Māori co-leader Debbie Ngarewa-Packer. On 26 February, Heather moved a motion of no confidence against Prime Minister Brown, citing disagreement with Brown's passport proposal and China partnership agreement. The motion was defeated by a margin of 13 to 9 votes.

Heather won re-election at the 2026 general election. Stating that he wanted to focus on rebuilding the party for the 2030 election, Heather nominated his younger brother and fellow United Party MP, Robert Stanley Heather, as leader of the official opposition.
