= Cook Islands United Party =

Political Party in the Cook Islands

- Abbreviation: CIUP
- Leader: Teariki Heather
- Founders: Teariki Heather; Nandi Glassie
- Founded: 24 November 2018
- Split from: Cook Islands Party
- Slogan: Faith – Hope – Love
- Seats in the Cook Islands Parliament: 4 / 24

Website
- cookislandsunitedparty.org.ck

The Cook Islands United Party is a political party in the Cook Islands. The party was founded in October 2018 by former Cabinet ministers Nandi Glassie and Teariki Heather.

Heather contested the 2019 Ivirua by-election, but was unsuccessful. The party did not contest the March 2019 Tengatangi-Areora-Ngatiarua by-election, with Glassie instead standing as a Democratic party candidate.

In December 2021 the party announced eleven candidates for the 2022 Cook Islands general election. The party platform included a two-term limit for MPs and the introduction of import levies to promote local business. Initial results showed the party winning 4 seats, with a 5th seat tied. The final results gave the party three seats.

The party won four seats in the 2026 election. Stating that he wanted to focus on rebuilding the party for the 2030 election, party leader Teariki Heather nominated his younger brother and MP for Akaoa, Robert Stanley Heather, as leader of the official Opposition. In addition, Taneao Ngamata was named as the deputy leader and Tim Varu as the party whip.

== Electoral performance ==
=== Legislative Assembly ===
Election	Votes	%	Seats	+/–	Rank	Government
2022	1,660	18.81	3 / 24	New	▲3rd	Opposition
2026	2,866	31.11	4 / 24	▲1	▲2nd	Opposition
