= Pukapuka–Nassau =

Electoral division of the Cook Islands

- Constituency for the Parliament of the Cook Islands
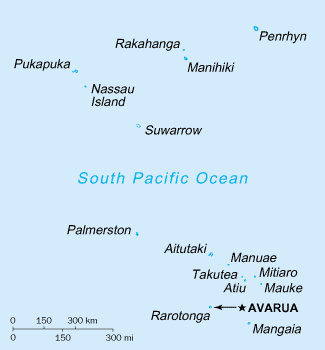
- Region: Outer Islands

Current constituency
- Created: 1964
- Number of members: 1
- Member: Tingika Elikana

Pukapuka–Nassau is a Cook Islands electoral division returning one member to the Cook Islands Parliament. Its current representative is Tingika Elikana, who has held the seat since 2018.

The electorate was created by the Cook Islands Constitution in 1964 and has not been adjusted since. It consists of the islands of Pukapuka and Nassau.

== Members of Parliament for Pukapuka-Nassau ==
Unless otherwise stated, all MPs terms began and ended at general elections.

| Name | Party | Elected |
|---|---|---|
| John Tariau | Unknown | 1965 |
| Inatio Akaruru | Cook Islands Party | 1968, 1972, 1974, 1978, 1983 (Mar), 1983 (Nov), 1989, 1994 |
| Tiaki Wuatai | Democratic Party | 2000, 2004 |
| Vai Peua | Cook Islands Party | 2006 |
| Vai Peua | Independent | |
| Tekii Lazaro | Cook Islands Party | 2010, 2011 by-election, 2014 |
| Tingika Elikana | Cook Islands Party | 2018, 2022, 2026 |

== Election results ==
=== 2026 election ===
2026 Cook Islands general election: Pukapuka–Nassau
| Party | Candidate | Votes | % | ±% |
|---|---|---|---|---|
| Cook Islands | Tingika Elikana^{†} | 146 | 51.0 | |
| Independent | Kirianu Nio | 140 | 49.0 | |
| Turnout | | 186 | | |
| Cook Islands hold | | Swing | | |
^{†} incumbent
