= Nandi Glassie =

Cook Islands politician (1951–2020)

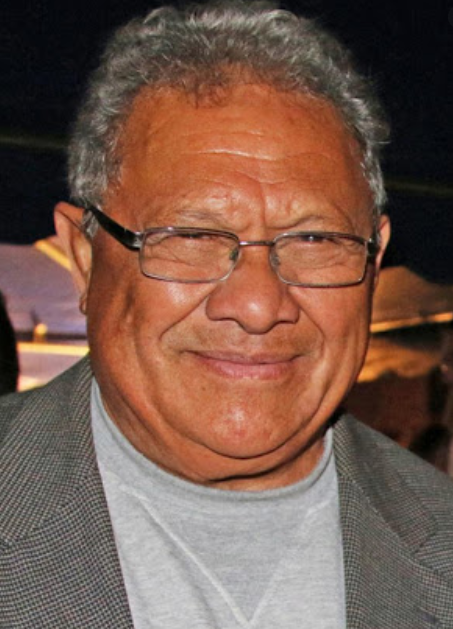
- Nandi Glassie

Minister of Health
- In office 3 December 2010 – 14 June 2018
- Prime Minister: Henry Puna
- Preceded by: Apii Piho
- Succeeded by: Rose Toki-Brown

Minister of Justice
- In office 15 March 2015 – 14 June 2018
- Preceded by: Teariki Heather
- Succeeded by: Rose Toki-Brown

Minister of Internal Affairs
- In office 3 November 2013 – 15 March 2015
- Preceded by: Mark Brown
- Succeeded by: Albert Nicholas

Minister of Agriculture
- In office 3 December 2010 – 24 July 2013
- Preceded by: Robert Wigmore
- Succeeded by: Kiriau Turepu

Member of the Cook Islands Parliament for Tengatangi–Areora–Ngatiarua
- In office 27 September 2006 – 14 June 2018
- Preceded by: Eugene Tatuava
- Succeeded by: Te-Hani Brown

Personal details
- Born: 21 May 1951 Atiu
- Died: 4 September 2020 (aged 69) Rarotonga
- Party: Cook Islands Party

Nandi Tuaine Glassie (21 May 1951 – 4 September 2020) was a Cook Islands politician who served as a Cabinet Minister. He was a member of the Cook Islands Party.

Glassie was born in Atiu, and educated at Atiu Primary School, Tereora College, then St Stephens School in Auckland. He attended the University of Auckland, graduating with a bachelor of Arts, before completing a Masters in Public Policy at Massey University. He had a long career as a public servant for the New Zealand Department of Labour, the Manukau City Council, and the Cook Islands Government. In 2005–2006 he was chief of staff in the office of the Cook Islands Prime Minister.

Glassie was first elected to Parliament in the 2006 snap election, defeating Cook Islands Democratic Party MP Eugene Tatuava. He served as a backbench MP for the 2006–2010 term.

== Cabinet ==
Glassie was re-elected in the 2010 election and appointed to Cabinet as Minister of Health and Minister of Agriculture. A Cabinet reshuffle in November 2013 saw him lose the Agriculture portfolio to Kiriau Turepu and take over as Minister of Internal Affairs, the Ombudsman, and Parliamentary Services.

He was re-elected at the 2014 election. A further Cabinet reshuffle in March 2015 saw him yield the Internal Affairs and Ombudsman portfolios to Albert Nicholas and become Minister of Justice. During this term Glassie launched a mental health strategy and a health workforce plan.

He lost his seat at the 2018 election to Te-Hani Brown. Following his election loss Glassie founded the Cook Islands United Party with former MP Teariki Heather. He subsequently contested the 2019 March Tengatangi-Areora-Ngatiarua by-election, sparked by the defection of Te-Hani Brown from the Democratic Party, as a Democratic Party candidate, but was unsuccessful. When Brown resigned again to avoid an unfavourable election petition ruling, he was too ill to contest a second by-election.

Glassie had four sons and lived with his wife in Rarotonga. He died on Rarotonga on 4 September 2020 of cancer.
