= Vai Peua =

Tamaiti Vai Peua (born 10 December 1950) is a Cook Islands politician and former member of the Cook Islands Parliament.

Peua was born on Rarotonga and educated at Pukapuka Primary school and Aitutaki Junior High School. He worked as a public servant, including serving as Deputy Register for the Cook Islands High Court from 1990, and acting Island Secretary in 1999. At the 2006 election he ran as a candidate for the Cook Islands Party in the constituency of Pukapuka-Nassau and won his seat, but he subsequently left the party and declared himself an independent.

In August 2010 Peua failed to be selected as a candidate for the Cook Islands Party in the 2010 election. He subsequently sought the nomination for the Democratic Party, but ultimately contested the election as an independent and lost the seat.
