= Mii Parima =

Cook Islands politician (1954–2008)

Mii Parima (16 January 1954 – 6 December 2008) was a Cook Islands politician, a member of the Cook Islands Parliament and a member of the Cook Islands Party.

Parima was born in Mangaia in the Cook Islands. He was first elected to Parliament in the 1994 general election, and represented the constituency of Tamarua for 15 years. Despite his long political career, he never held a cabinet post.

Parima's life ended in Auckland on 6 December 2008.
