= Tengatangi–Areora–Ngatiarua =

Cook Islands electoral division

- Constituency for the Parliament of the Cook Islands
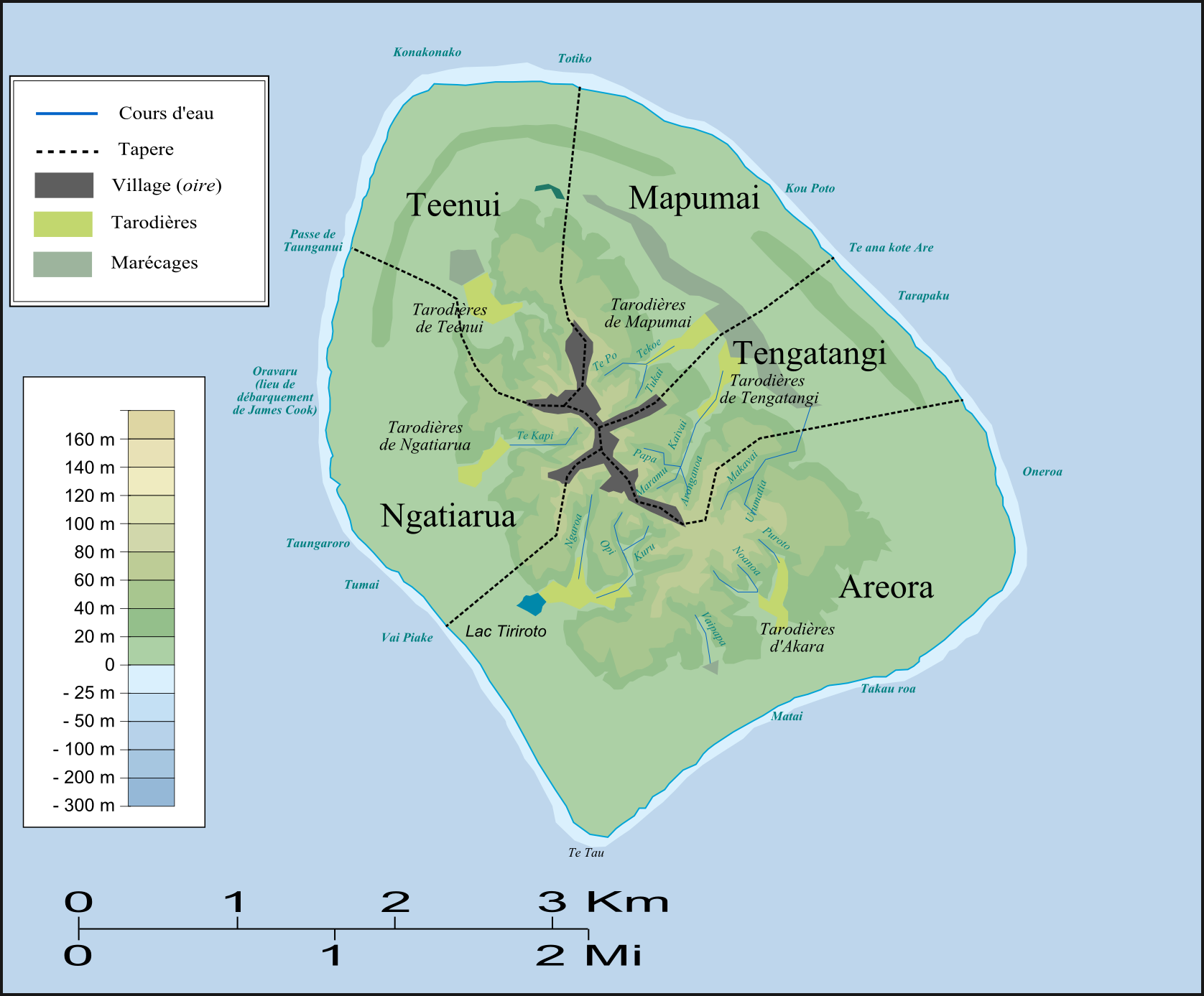
- Region: Atiu

Current constituency
- Created: 1981
- Number of members: 1
- Member: Te-Hani Brown
- Created from: Atiu

Tengatangi–Areora–Ngatiarua is a Cook Islands electoral division returning one member to the Cook Islands Parliament. Its current representative is Te-Hani Brown, who has held the seat since 2018.

The electorate was created in 1981, when the Constitution Amendment (No. 9) Act 1980 adjusted electorate boundaries and split the multimember electorate of Atiu into two separate constituencies.

== Members of Parliament for Tengatangi-Areora-Ngatiarua ==
Unless otherwise stated, all MPs terms began and ended at general elections.

Name	Party	Elected	Left Office	Reason
Norman George	Democrat	1983, 1989	2004	Changed parties
Norman George	Alliance	1994, 1999	2004	Defeated
Eugene Tatuava	Democrat	2004	2006	Defeated
Nandi Glassie	Cook Islands Party	2006	2018	Defeated
Te-Hani Brown	Independent	2018, 2022, 2026	(incumbent)	

== Election results ==
=== 2026 election ===
2026 Cook Islands general election: Tengatangi–Areora–Ngatiarua
Party	Candidate	Votes	%	±%
Independent-Enuamanu	Te-Hani Brown^{†}	95	66.9	
Independent	Puai Tane Wichman	47	33.1	
Turnout		142		
Independent hold		Swing		
^{†} incumbent

=== 2006 election ===
Cook Islands general election, 2006: Tengatangi-Areora-Ngatiarua
Party	Candidate	Votes	%	±%
Cook Islands	Nandi Glassie	104	58.8	
Democratic	Eugene Tatuava	73	41.2	
Turnout		177	97.3	

=== 2004 election ===
Cook Islands general election, 2004: Tengatangi-Areora-Ngatiarua
Party	Candidate	Votes	%	±%
Democratic	Eugene Tatuava	73	35.6	
TE	Norman George	67	32.7	
Cook Islands	Nooroa Tou	65	31.7	
Turnout		205	97.6	

== See also ==
- March 2019 Tengatangi-Areora-Ngatiarua by-election
- November 2019 Tengatangi-Areora-Ngatiarua by-election
