= Vaipae–Tautu =

Electoral division of the Cook Islands

- Constituency for the Parliament of the Cook Islands
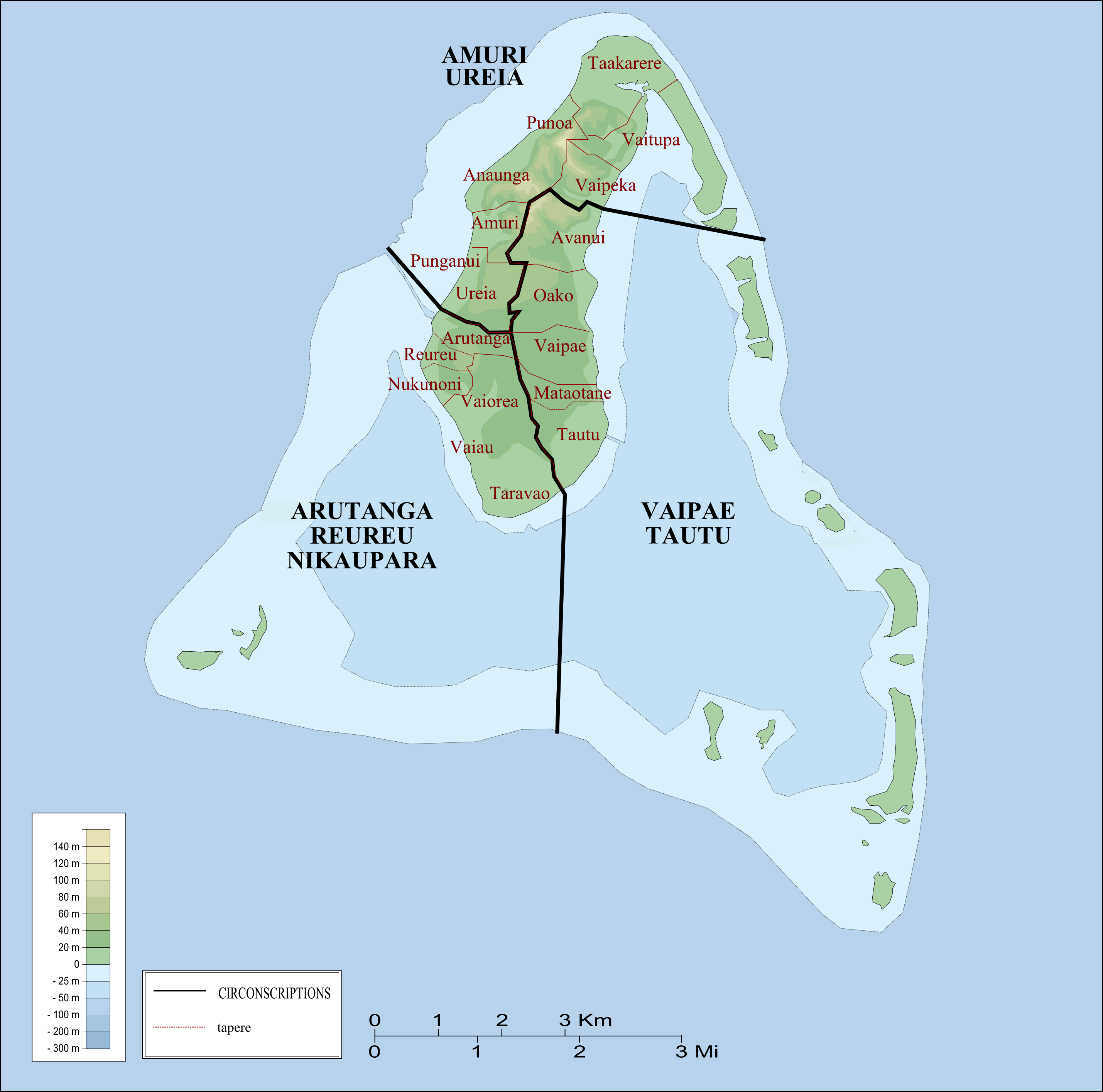
- Region: Aitutaki

Current constituency
- Created: 1981
- Number of members: 1
- Member: Teokotai Herman
- Created from: Aitutaki

Vaipae–Tautu is a Cook Islands electoral division returning one member to the Cook Islands Parliament. Its current representative is Kitai Teinakore, who has held the seat since 2018.

The electorate was created in 1981, when the Constitution Amendment (No. 9) Act 1980–1981 adjusted electorate boundaries and split the electorate of Aitutaki into three.

== Election results ==
2026 Cook Islands general election: Vaipae–Tautu
| Party | Candidate | Votes | % | ±% |
|---|---|---|---|---|
| Cook Islands | Teokotai Herman^{†} | 241 | 52.3 | |
| Democratic | Teariki Reva George | 139 | 30.2 | |
| Cook Islands United | Teariki Kureta Tangua | 81 | 17.6 | |
| Turnout | | 461 | | |
| Cook Islands hold | | Swing | | |
^{†} incumbent
