= Tereora College =

Secondary school in Nikao, Rarotonga, Cook Islands

Location
- PO Box 107; Avarua; Rarotonga; 21.2053°S 159.80713°W

Information
- Motto: Cook Islands Māori: Kia Toa (Be Brave)
- Established: 1895 / 1954
- Principal: Sharyn Paio
- Years offered: 9–13
- Gender: Coeducational
- Enrolment: 760
- Website: https://www.tereora.edu.ck/

Tereora College is a secondary school in Nikao, Rarotonga, Cook Islands. It is the oldest secondary school in the Cook Islands and the national college of the Cook Islands for Year 9–13 students.

The school was first established in 1895 by the London Missionary Society. It closed in 1911 by the New Zealand colonial administration. It was re-opened in 1954 as a public school. The junior school offers the Cook Islands National Curriculum, while the senior school offers levels 1 - 3 of the New Zealand National Certificate of Educational Achievement.

The school buildings were built in the 1950s, but by 2015 were old and damp. In 2015 during the celebrations of the Cook Islands' 50th anniversary of self-government, New Zealand Prime Minister John Key announced an $11.7 million gift to redevelop the college. The redevelopment was to be designed by two former students who had studied architecture in New Zealand, and run in partnership with the Cook Islands investment Corporation. New Zealand Prime Minister Jacinda Ardern opened stage one of the redevelopment in March 2018.

A book on the early history of the school, Below the Bluff at Nikao, was published in 1995.

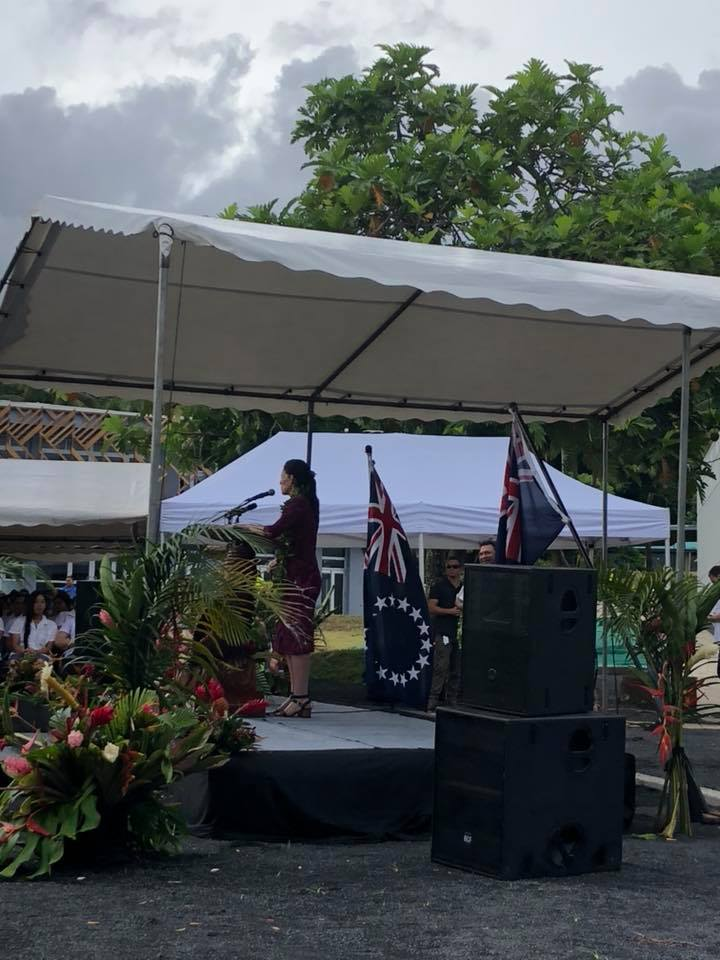
Jacinda Ardern opening Tereora College redevelopment in 2018

== School Anau ==
The school groups students into four anau each named for a mountain on Rarotonga:

| Ikurangi |
| Te Kou |
| Maungaroa |
| Te Manga |

Students stay in the same anau class for their whole time at school.

== Notable alumni ==
- Pa George Karika (born 1893), soldier and ariki
- Jim Marurai (born 1947), 8th Prime Minister of the Cook Islands
- Mike Tavioni (born 1947), artist
- Mark Brown, Current Prime Minister of the Cook Islands
- Teariki Heather (born 1959), politician and former Deputy Prime Minister of the Cook Islands
- Margharet Matenga (born 1955/56), netball player, NZ Silver Ferns & Cook Is
- Ngamau Munokoa (born 1944), Cabinet Minister and the first woman Deputy Prime Minister
- Tina Browne, lawyer and Democratic party leader
- William (Smiley) Heather (born 1958), Deputy Democratic Party leader
- Terepai Maoate Jnr (born 1961), Former MP

== Notable staff ==
- Bali Haque
