= 1999 Cook Islands general election =

- 16 June 1999
- All 25 seats in Parliament; 13 seats needed for a majority
Party	Leader	Vote %	Seats	+/–
Democratic Alliance	Terepai Maoate	44.48	10	+7
Cook Islands	Geoffrey Henry	39.81	11	−9
New Alliance	Norman George	13.40	4	+2
This lists parties that won seats. See the complete results below.
Prime Minister before	Prime Minister after
Geoffrey Henry; CIP	Geoffrey Henry; CIP

General elections were held in the Cook Islands on 16 June 1999 to elect 25 MPs to the Parliament. The Cook Islands Party won 11 seats, the Democratic Alliance Party 10 seats, and the New Alliance Party 4 seats.

== Results ==
Party	Votes	%	Seats	+/–
Democratic Alliance Party	4,168	44.48	10	+7
Cook Islands Party	3,731	39.81	11	–9
New Alliance Party	1,256	13.40	4	+2
Independents	216	2.30	0	0
Total	9,371	100.00	25	0
Registered voters/turnout	10,601	–		
Source: Nohlen et al.

== Aftermath ==
Following the elections, the CIP formed a coalition with the NAP, with Geoffrey Henry as Prime Minister and NAP leader Norman George as his deputy. However, three members of the CIP subsequently quit the party and joined the Democrats, forcing Henry's resignation. Joe Williams subsequently became Prime Minister, but was forced to resign in November following a by-election and further coalition realignment. Finally, the Democratic party's Terepai Maoate became Prime Minister, with George as his deputy.
