= 15th Cook Islands Parliament =

The 15th Cook Islands Parliament is the previous term of the Parliament of the Cook Islands. Its composition was determined by the 2010 elections on 17 November 2010.

Due to an electoral petition declaring the election of Tekii Lazaro invalid, the 15th Parliament initially consisted of only 23 members. A by-election was held for the vacant Pukapuka-Nassau seat.

The Parliament sat for the first time on 18 February 2011. It was dissolved on 17 April 2014.

The Speaker of the 15th Parliament was initially former Prime Minister Geoffrey Henry. Following Henry's death in May 2012, Niki Rattle was appointed Speaker.

== Members ==
=== Initial MPs ===
Name	Party	Electorate	Term
George Angene	CIP	Tupapa/Maraerenga	First
Teina Bishop	CIP	Arutanga/Nikaupara/Reureu	Fourth
Mark Brown	CIP	Takuvaine/Tutakimoa	First
Norman George	CIP	Teenui-Mapumai	Seventh
Nandi Glassie	CIP	Tengatangi/Areora/Ngatiarua	Second
Teariki Heather	CIP	Akaoa	Third
William (Smiley) Heather	DP	Ruaau	Second
John Henry	CIP	Avatiu/Ruatonga	First
Atatoa Herman	CIP	Ngatangiia	First
Moana Ioane	CIP	Vaipae/Tautu	First
Toanui Isamaela	CIP	Amuri/Ureia	First
Tom Marsters	CIP	Murienua	Sixth
Jim Marurai	DP	Ivirua	Fifth
Ngamau Munokoa	DP	Nikao/Panama	Fifth
Winton Pickering	DP	Oneroa	Third
Pukeiti Pukeiti	CIP	Tamarua	Second
Henry Puna	CIP	Manihiki	Second
Wilkie Rasmussen	DP	Penrhyn	Fourth
Taunga Toka	DP	Rakahanga	First
Tai Tura	CIP	Mauke	First
Kiriau Turepu	CIP	Matavera	First
Tangata Vavia	DP	Mitiaro	Fifth
Robert Wigmore	DP	Titikaveka	Third

=== New members ===
Name	Party	Electorate	Term
Tekii Lazaro	CIP	Pukapuka-Nassau	First
Selina Napa	DP	Titikaveka	First
James Beer	DP	Murienua	First

=== Summary of changes ===
- On 8 March 2011 Norman George resigned from the Cook Islands Party and became an independent.
- Tekii Lazaro was elected to the seat of Pukapuka on 8 June 2011 following the byelection.
- Robert Wigmore died on 13 April 2012.
- Selina Napa was elected to the seat of Titikaveka on 21 June 2012 following the 2012 Titikaveka by-election.
- Tetangi Matapo was elected to the seat of Tamarua on 29 January 2013 following the 2013 Tamarua by-election.
- Tom Marsters resigned from Parliament on 25 September 2013 following his appointment as Queen's Representative. He was eventually replaced by James Beer after the 2014 Murienua by-election.
