= March 1983 Cook Islands general election =

- 30 March 1983
- 24 seats in the Parliament; 13 seats needed for a majority
Party	Leader	Vote %	Seats	+/–
Cook Islands	Geoffrey Henry	50.1	13	−2
Democratic	Thomas Davis	44.9	11	+4
This lists parties that won seats. See the complete results below.
Prime Minister before	Prime Minister after
Thomas Davis; DP	Geoffrey Henry; CIP

General elections were held in the Cook Islands on 30 March 1983. The result was a victory for the Cook Islands Party (CIP) of Geoffrey Henry, who became prime minister. However, the CIP lost their majority by the end of July, eventually resulting in Parliament being dissolved and new elections called in November 1983.

== Electoral system ==
Previously the Legislative Assembly had 22 members elected from 12 constituencies of between one and four seats in size. Following constitutional reforms, the Assembly was renamed Parliament and the number of members was increased to 24, with the country split into 23 single-member constituencies and an additional constituency for overseas voters.

== Campaign ==
Campaigning was much milder than in the 1978 elections, with the government – now controlled by the Democratic Party – having introduced limits on radio airtime and newspaper advertising by parties.

== Results ==
Prime Minister Thomas Davis and Minister Iaveta Short both lost their seats.

Party	Votes	%	Seats	+/–
Cook Islands Party		50.1	13	–2
Democratic Party		44.9	11	+4
Unity Party		5.0	0	0
Total			24	+2
Registered voters/turnout		89		
Source: Pacific Islands Monthly

=== By electorate ===
Constituency	Candidate	Votes	%
Amuri–Ureia	Kura Strickland	174	56.86
Amuri–Ureia	Paora Teiti	104	33.99
Amuri–Ureia	Banaba Samuela	28	9.15
Arutanga–Reureu–Nikaupara	Ngereteina Puna	201	62.23
Arutanga–Reureu–Nikaupara	Tepaki Nooapii Tepaki	106	32.82
Arutanga–Reureu–Nikaupara	George Kurariki George	13	4.02
Arutanga–Reureu–Nikaupara	Marraeara Teikii	3	0.93
Avatiu–Ruatonga–Palmerston	Rei Jack	225	50.79
Avatiu–Ruatonga–Palmerston	Thomas Davis	201	45.37
Avatiu–Ruatonga–Palmerston	Michael Tavioni	17	3.84
Ivirua	Papamama Pokino	116	70.73
Ivirua	Taataiti Tangatakino	48	29.27
Manihiki	George Frederick Ellis Jr.	109	52.91
Manihiki	Ebinisa Ben Toma	95	46.12
Manihiki	Takai Ngatipa	2	0.97
Matavera	William Papa Cowan	159	57.19
Matavera	Maru Taramai	112	40.29
Matavera	Akaiti Tamarua Ama	7	2.52
Mauke	Tupui Ariki Henry	161	60.07
Mauke	Mana Strickland	82	30.60
Mauke	Pokoina Tommy	17	6.34
Mauke	Ngatangata Rairi	8	2.99
Mitiaro	Tiki Tetava	62	52.99
Mitiaro	Ngatupuna David	49	41.88
Mitiaro	Tungane-apekore Pokoati	6	5.13
Murienua	Jimmy Mareiti	279	51.29
Murienua	William Heather	179	32.90
Murienua	Sadaraka Metuakore Sadaraka	50	9.19
Murienua	Exham Wichman	36	6.62
Ngatangiia	Terepai Maoate	173	51.64
Ngatangiia	Iaveta Short	151	45.07
Ngatangiia	Tuainekore-o-Turepu Teariki Tamaroia Keenan	11	3.28
Nikao–Panama	Vincent Ingram	270	51.14
Nikao–Panama	Richard Pare Browne	207	39.20
Nikao–Panama	Percy Frederick Hendeson	51	9.66
Oneroa	Matepi Toru Matepi	225	73.05
Oneroa	Maarateina Atatoa	83	26.95
Penrhyn	Tangaroa Tangaroa	187	67.51
Penrhyn	Walter Benedito	85	30.69
Penrhyn	Aileen Mustonen	5	1.81
Pukapuka–Nassau	Inatio Akaruru	238	68.39
Pukapuka–Nassau	Waleeu Wuatai	88	25.29
Pukapuka–Nassau	Kautoki Katoa	22	6.32
Rakahanga	Pupuke Robati	103	70.07
Rakahanga	Arahu Tuteru	44	29.93
Ruaau	Harry Tauei Napa	176	40.84
Ruaau	Raymond Pirangi	174	40.37
Ruaau	Joseph Williams	81	18.79
Takuvaine–Tutakimoa	Geoffrey Henry	330	51.81
Takuvaine–Tutakimoa	Frederick Tutu Goodwin	275	43.17
Takuvaine–Tutakimoa	Eric Man Browne	32	5.02
Tamarua	Tearapiri Teaurima	56	65.88
Tamarua	Pukeiti Pukeiti	29	34.12
Teenui–Mapumai	Tangata Simiona	94	53.11
Teenui–Mapumai	Metuaangai Teritaiti	83	46.89
Tengatangi–Areora–Ngatiarua	Norman George	185	58.18
Tengatangi–Areora–Ngatiarua	Tepou Boaza	132	41.51
Tengatangi–Areora–Ngatiarua	Piri Puruto	1	0.31
Titikaveka	Matapo Matapo	232	50.54
Titikaveka	Teariki Matenga	201	43.79
Titikaveka	Teariki Tiakana Numanga	26	5.66
Tupapa–Maraerenga	Teanua Dan Kamana	318	50.88
Tupapa–Maraerenga	Teariki Piri	269	43.04
Tupapa–Maraerenga	Kautai Tata Strickland	38	6.08
Vaipae–Tautu	Bill Paiti	258	76.11
Vaipae–Tautu	Maramotoa Turi	76	22.42
Vaipae–Tautu	William Ioane Estall	5	1.47
Overseas	Fanaura Kingstone	244	52.47
Overseas	Iaveta Arthur	183	39.35
Overseas	Tauei Solomona	38	8.17

== Aftermath ==
Following the elections, Henry appointed a seven-member cabinet, including the first female minister, Fanaura Kingstone. Kingstone had been elected from the overseas constituency with the intention of resigning in protest at the creation of the constituency. However, she later changed her mind as the CIP failed to win a significant majority.

Portfolio	Member
Prime Minister, External Affairs, Finance, Immigration, Ombudsman, Parliamentary Services, Police, Tourism	Geoffrey Henry
Agriculture, Health	Terepai Maoate
Broadcasting, Fisheries, Justice, Local Government, Marine Resources, Newspaper Corporation, Outer Islands, Survey	Tupui Henry
Corrective Services, Education, Public Services, Religion	Ngereteina Puna
Development, Energy, Labour, Planning, Statistics, Trade, Transport	George Ellis
Electrical Office, Hurricane Safety, Public Works, Water Commission	Inatio Akaruru
Internal Affairs, Postmistress General	Fanaura Kingstone

Shortly after the elections, the Democratic Party MP for Atiu lost their seat after a successful petition against the result in the constituency, increasing the CIP majority to three. A court case also began as Henry had failed to resign from office within the first seven days of the parliamentary session and seek re-appointment, as required by the constitution. This was initially viewed as a technicality due to the CIP majority in Parliament. However, in July CIP MP Matapo Matapo died and Tupui Henry left the CIP to sit with the Democratic Party, leaving an 11–11 tie. The final verdict of the Court of Appeal was announced on 29 July, requiring Henry to resign.

Without a majority, Henry resigned on 2 August. Queen's Representative Gaven Donne convened a series of votes to determine who could attain a parliamentary majority, with the vote on 10 August ending as 11 each for Geoffrey and Tupui Henry. With the Atiu by-election – almost certain to be won by the Democratic Party – due on 12 August, Donne asked the two leaders to wait until the by-election for Matapo's seat before a government was appointed. Tupui Henry and Leader of the Opposition Vincent Ingram agreed in the belief that they could win Matapo's former constituency. However, Geoffrey Henry declined. This resulted in Donne dissolving Parliament on 17 August, calling fresh elections for November, and appointing Geoffrey Henry as caretaker prime minister with restricted powers.
