= November 1983 Cook Islands general election =

- 2 November 1983
- 24 seats in the Parliament; 13 seats needed for a majority
Party	Leader	Vote %	Seats	+/–
Democratic	Thomas Davis	48.5	13	+2
Cook Islands	Geoffrey Henry	48.3	11	−2
This lists parties that won seats. See the complete results below.
Prime Minister before	Prime Minister after
Geoffrey Henry; CIP	Thomas Davis; DP

General elections were held in the Cook Islands on 2 November 1983. The result was a victory for the Democratic Party, which won 13 of the 24 seats. A coalition government was formed with the opposition Cook Islands Party, with Democratic Party leader Thomas Davis as prime minister and CIP leader Geoffrey Henry as deputy prime minister. Henry was later replaced with Terepai Maoate.

== Background ==
In the March 1983 elections, the CIP had won a 13–11 majority in Parliament, resulting in CIP leader Geoffrey Henry becoming prime minister. Shortly after the elections, the Democratic Party MP for Atiu lost their seat after a successful petition against the result in the constituency, increasing the CIP majority to three. A court case also began as Henry had failed to resign from office within the first seven days of the parliamentary session and seek re-appointment, as required by the constitution. This was initially viewed as a technicality due to the CIP majority in Parliament. However, in July CIP MP Matapo Matapo died and Tupui Henry left the CIP to sit with the Democratic Party, resulting in an 11–11 tie. The final verdict of the Court of Appeal was announced on 29 July, requiring Henry to resign.

Without a majority, Henry resigned on 2 August. Queen's Representative Gaven Donne convened a series of votes to determine who could attain a parliamentary majority, with the vote on 10 August ending as 11 each for Geoffrey and Tupui Henry. With the Atiu by-election – almost certain to be won by the Democratic Party – due on 12 August, Donne asked the two leaders to wait until the by-election for Matapo's seat before a government was appointed. Tupui Henry and Leader of the Opposition Vincent Ingram agreed in the belief that they could win Matapo's former constituency. However, Geoffrey Henry declined. This resulted in Donne dissolving Parliament on 17 August, calling fresh elections for November, and appointing Geoffrey Henry as caretaker prime minister with restricted powers.

== Campaign ==
Prior to the elections, Tupui Henry formed a new party, the Cook Islands Party for Alliance, which put forward seven candidates. The Unity Party nominated three candidates, one of whom withdrew before polling day. Following the elections earlier in the year, the CIP did not publish a new manifesto as its policies had not changed.

== Results ==
Deputy Prime Minister George Ellis and minister Fanaura Kingstone were amongst the incumbent MPs losing their seats.

Party	Votes	%	Seats	+/–
Democratic Party		48.5	13	+2
Cook Islands Party		48.3	11	–2
Cook Islands Party for Alliance			0	New
Unity Party			0	0
Total			24	0
Registered voters/turnout		93.4		
Source: Pacific Islands Monthly

=== By electorate ===
Constituency	Candidate	Votes	%
Amuri–Ureia	Kura Strickland	154	54.04
Amuri–Ureia	Paora Teiti	99	34.74
Amuri–Ureia	Joseph Williams	32	11.23
Arutanga–Reureu–Nikaupara	Ngereteina Puna	186	58.31
Arutanga–Reureu–Nikaupara	Tatevano Tatevano	105	32.92
Arutanga–Reureu–Nikaupara	Nikau Tangaroa	28	8.78
Avatiu–Ruatonga–Palmerston	Thomas Davis	234	50.00
Avatiu–Ruatonga–Palmerston	Rei Jack	227	48.50
Avatiu–Ruatonga–Palmerston	Louise Eikura Graham	7	1.50
Ivirua	Papamama Pokino	119	75.32
Ivirua	Taataiti Tangatakino	39	24.68
Manihiki	Ebinisa Ben Toma	112	53.85
Manihiki	George Frederick Ellis Jr.	95	45.67
Manihiki	Temu Ngarima George	1	0.48
Matavera	William Papa Cowan	148	51.93
Matavera	Ngatungane Maximus Pierre	137	48.07
Mauke	Vaine Tereapii Tairea	95	35.19
Mauke	Mana Strickland	79	29.26
Mauke	Temaeva Karati	61	22.59
Mauke	Tupui Ariki Henry	35	12.96
Mitiaro	Ngatupuna David	67	54.47
Mitiaro	Tiki Tetava	56	45.53
Murienua	Jimmy Mareiti	286	52.38
Murienua	William Heather	198	36.26
Murienua	Hugh McCrone Ngamata Henry	62	11.36
Ngatangiia	Terepai Maoate	177	75.32
Ngatangiia	Iaveta Short	166	24.68
Nikao–Panama	Vincent Ingram	320	55.94
Nikao–Panama	Tina Pupuke Browne	252	44.06
Oneroa	Matepi Toru Matepi	239	76.36
Oneroa	Metuakore Ruatoe	74	23.64
Penrhyn	Tangaroa Tangaroa	162	65.32
Penrhyn	Tini Soa Joseph Snr.	86	34.68
Pukapuka–Nassau	Inatio Akaruru	281	72.80
Pukapuka–Nassau	Waleeu Wuatai	82	21.24
Pukapuka–Nassau	Kautoki Katoa	23	5.96
Rakahanga	Pupuke Robati	101	68.24
Rakahanga	Arahu Tuteru	47	31.76
Ruaau	Raymond Pirangi	182	39.74
Ruaau	Tauei Solomon	156	34.06
Ruaau	Tauei Harry Napa	120	26.20
Takuvaine–Tutakimoa	Geoffrey Henry	335	52.02
Takuvaine–Tutakimoa	Frederick Tutu Goodwin	307	47.67
Takuvaine–Tutakimoa	Michael Tavioni	2	0.31
Tamarua	Tearapiri Teaurima	62	58.49
Tamarua	Ruti Matapo	44	41.51
Teenui–Mapumai	Tangata Simiona	112	51.38
Teenui–Mapumai	Metuaangai Teritaiti	106	48.62
Tengatangi–Areora–Ngatiarua	Norman George	153	58.40
Tengatangi–Areora–Ngatiarua	Neville Walker Isherwood Pearson	109	41.60
Titikaveka	Teariki Matenga	257	53.65
Titikaveka	Tekaotiki Matapo	222	46.35
Tupapa–Maraerenga	Teanua Dan Kamana	362	56.30
Tupapa–Maraerenga	Teariki Piri	281	43.70
Vaipae–Tautu	Bill Paiti	262	78.21
Vaipae–Tautu	Maramatoa Turi	66	19.70
Vaipae–Tautu	Banaba Samuel	7	2.09
Overseas	Iaveta Arthur	330	58.51
Overseas	Fanaura Kingstone	225	39.89
Overseas	Mataio Emil Nielson	9	1.60

== Aftermath ==
Following the elections, the result in the constituency of Ruaau was declared void due to treating by an unsuccessful candidate.
