= 1983 Cook Islands general election =

The 1983 Cook Islands general election may refer to two elections held in the Cook Islands in 1983:

- March 1983 Cook Islands general election
- November 1983 Cook Islands general election
