= Koudougou, Ivory Coast =

Koudougou
- Village
- Location in Ivory Coast
- Coordinates: 7°24′N 6°25′W
- Country: Ivory Coast
- District: Sassandra-Marahoué
- Region: Haut-Sassandra
- Department: Vavoua
- Sub-prefecture: Vavoua
- Time zone: UTC+0 (GMT)

Koudougou is the name of three clustered villages in western Ivory Coast. They in the sub-prefecture of Vavoua, Vavoua Department, Haut-Sassandra Region, Sassandra-Marahoué District. The villages are named Koudougou 1, Koudougou 2, and Koudougou 3, and are each separated by a few kilometres.

Koudougou was a commune until March 2012, when it became one of 1,126 communes nationwide that were abolished.
