= Vaafla =

- Village
- Location in Ivory Coast
- Coordinates: 7°25′N 6°39′W
- Country: Ivory Coast
- District: Sassandra-Marahoué
- Region: Haut-Sassandra
- Department: Vavoua
- Sub-prefecture: Séitifla
- Time zone: UTC+0 (GMT)

Vaafla is a village in western Ivory Coast. It is in the sub-prefecture of Séitifla, Vavoua Department, Haut-Sassandra Region, Sassandra-Marahoué District.

Vaafla was a commune until March 2012, when it became one of 1,126 communes nationwide that were abolished.
