= Yalla =

Yalla (Arabic: يلا, 'come on' or 'hurry up') may refer to:

- Yalla (band), a folk rock band from Uzbekistan
- Yalla!, a 2011 album by Thomas White
- "Yalla" (song), a 2015 song by Inna
- "Yalla", a 2020 song by Capital T
- "Yalla", a song by Arash from the 2005 album Arash
- "Yalla", a song by Calogero from the 2004 album 3
- "Yalla Erhal Ya Bashar", a song by Abdel Rahman Farhood
- "Yalla Yalla", a song by Joe Strummer and the Mescaleros from the 1999 album Rock Art and the X-Ray Style
- "Yalla Yalla (Let's Go)", a song by Cracker from the 2009 album Sunrise in the Land of Milk and Honey
- "Jhoomta Mausam Mast Mahina" or "Yalla Yalla", a song by Shankar-Jaikishan, Lata Mangeshkar and Manna Dey from the 1959 Indian film Ujala
- Yalla (journal), focusing on humanizing the Israeli–Palestinian conflict

== See also ==
- Yala (disambiguation)
- Jalla (disambiguation)
- Yalla-y-Poora (disambiguation)
- Yallah, New South Wales
- Yallahs, a town in Jamaica
