= Yala =

Yala may refer to:

== Places ==
- Yala, Ivory Coast, a village
- Yala, Kenya, a town in Siaya County, Kenya
- Lalitpur, Nepal, also known as Yala
- Yala, Nigeria, a Local Government Area in Cross River State
- Yala National Park, Sri Lanka
- Yala Province, Thailand
  - Yala, Thailand, its administrative capital
  - Amphoe Mueang Yala, capital district of the province of Yala

== People ==
- Teremoana Yala, Cook Island activist and diplomat

== Music ==
- "Y.A.L.A.", a 2013 song by M.I.A. from the album Matangi
- Y.A.L.A, a 2018 album by Genetikk
- "Yala", a 2003 song by Oumou Sangaré from the compilation Oumou

== Other uses ==
- Yala language, an African language spoken in the Niger-Congo area
- Yala (moth), a genus of moth in the family Geometridae
- Yala, a goddess in the CrossGen comicbook series The First
- Yala River, a river in western Kenya
- Yala United F.C., Thai football club

== See also ==
- Yalla (disambiguation)
- Yallah, New South Wales
