= Titikaveka (electorate) =

Cook Islands electoral division

- Constituency for the Parliament of the Cook Islands
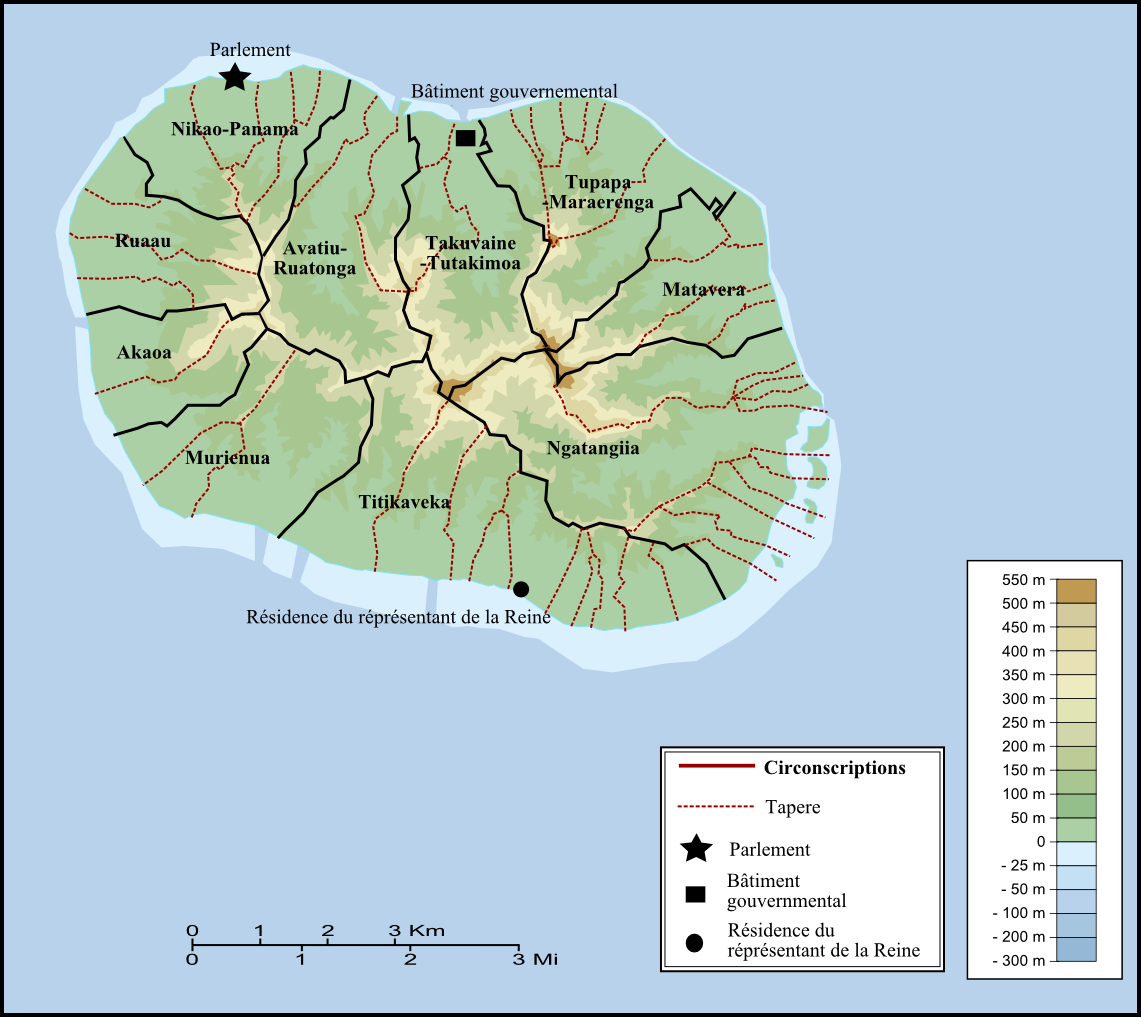
- Region: Rarotonga

Current constituency
- Created: 1981
- Number of members: 1
- Member: Sonny Williams
- Created from: Takitumu

Titikaveka is a Cook Islands electoral division returning one member to the Cook Islands Parliament.

The electorate was created in 1981, when the Constitution Amendment (No. 9) Act 1980–1981 adjusted electorate boundaries and split the electorate of Takitumu into three. It consists of the tapere of Tikioki, Akapuao, Te Puna, Titikaveka, Kauare, Arakuo, Turoa, Totokoitu, Avaavaroa, and Vaimaanga on the island of Rarotonga.

== Members of Parliament ==
Election	Member	Party
1983 (March)	Matapo	Cook Islands Party
1983 (Nov)	Teariki Matenga	Democratic Party
1989, 1994	Tekaotiki Matapo	Cook Islands Party
1999	Robert Wigmore	Democratic Party
2004	Tekaotiki Matapo	Cook Islands Party
2006, 2007 by-election 2010	Robert Wigmore	Democratic Party
2012 by-election, 2014, 2018	Selina Napa	Democratic Party
2022, 2026	Sonny Williams	Cook Islands Party

== Election results ==
2026 Cook Islands general election: Titikaveka
Party	Candidate	Votes	%	±%
Cook Islands	Sonny Williams^{†}	363	45.9	
Cook Islands United	Elizabeth Iro	238	30.1	
Democratic	Sholan Ivaiti	189	23.9	
Turnout		790		
Cook Islands hold		Swing		
^{†} incumbent
