= Matapo Matapo =

Member of Parliament
- In office 1983
- Preceded by: Seat established
- Succeeded by: Teariki Matenga
- Constituency: Titikaveka

Personal details
- Died: 25 July 1983; Rarotonga, Cook Islands
- Political party: Cook Islands Party

Matapo Matapo (died 25 July 1983) was a Cook Islands businessman and politician. He briefly served as a Member of Parliament for several months before his death.

== Biography ==
Matapo was a planter and became a well-known businessman in the 1950s. A member of the Cook Islands Party, he was a candidate in a 1977 by-election for the Takitumu seat following the death of Tiakana Numanga. However, he was defeated by Iaveta Short.

He ran again in the new Titikaveka constituency in the March 1983 general elections and was elected to Parliament. However, he died a few months later. The loss of his seat led to the government losing its majority and was one of the causes of early elections being held in November later in the year.
