= Sébédoufla =

Sébédoufla Sobédoufla
- Village
- Location in Ivory Coast
- Coordinates: 7°44′N 6°24′W
- Country: Ivory Coast
- District: Sassandra-Marahoué
- Region: Haut-Sassandra
- Department: Vavoua
- Sub-prefecture: Dananon
- Time zone: UTC+0 (GMT)

Sébédoufla (also spelled Sobédoufla) is a village in central Ivory Coast. It is in the sub-prefecture of Dananon, Vavoua Department, Haut-Sassandra Region, Sassandra-Marahoué District.

Sébédoufla was a commune until March 2012, when it became one of 1,126 communes nationwide that were abolished.
