= 1989 general election =

1989 general election may refer to:

- 1989 Antigua and Barbuda general election
- 1989 Argentine general election
- 1989 Botswana general election
- 1989 Cook Islands general election
- 1989 Indian general election
- 1989 Irish general election
- 1989 Jamaican general election
- 1989 South African general election
- 1989 Spanish general election
- 1989 Uruguayan general election
