= Vao =

Vao may refer to:

- Vao language, Oceanic language spoken in Vanuatu
- Vao (island), island of Vanuatu
- Vao, Ivory Coast, village in Sassandra-Marahoué District, Ivory Coast
- Vao, New Caledonia, settlement on the Isle of Pines, New Caledonia, France
- Vao, Lääne-Viru County, village in Väike-Maarja Parish, Lääne-Viru County, Estonia
- Vao, Järva County, village in Koeru Parish, Järva County, Estonia
- Vao, Tuvalu, village on Nanumea, Tuvalu

== See also ==
- VAO (disambiguation)
- Väo, subdistrict of Lasnamäe District, Tallinn, Estonia
- VAIO, a sub-brand for many of Sony's computer products
