= Monoko-Zohi =

- Village
- Location in Ivory Coast
- Coordinates: 7°5′N 6°51′W
- Country: Ivory Coast
- District: Sassandra-Marahoué
- Region: Haut-Sassandra
- Department: Vavoua
- Sub-prefecture: Dania
- Time zone: UTC+0 (GMT)

Monoko-Zohi is a village in western Ivory Coast. It is in the sub-prefecture of Dania, Vavoua Department, Haut-Sassandra Region, Sassandra-Marahoué District.

Monoko-Zohi was a commune until March 2012, when it became one of 1,126 communes nationwide that were abolished.

In 2002, Monoko-Zohi saw 120 unarmed civilians killed by government forces as part of the civil unrest in the country.
