= Vao, Ivory Coast =

Vao
- Village
- Location in Ivory Coast
- Coordinates: 7°27′N 6°59′W
- Country: Ivory Coast
- District: Sassandra-Marahoué
- Region: Haut-Sassandra
- Department: Vavoua
- Sub-prefecture: Dania
- Time zone: UTC+0 (GMT)

Vao is a village in western Ivory Coast. It is in the sub-prefecture of Dania, Vavoua Department, Haut-Sassandra Region, Sassandra-Marahoué District.

Vao was a commune until March 2012, when it became one of 1,126 communes nationwide that were abolished.
