= Overseas (Cook Islands electorate) =

Former electorate of the Cook Islands Parliament

- Former constituency for the Parliament of the Cook Islands

Former constituency
- Created: 1981
- Abolished: 2003
- Number of members: 1

The Overseas seat was a Cook Islands electoral division returning one member to the Cook Islands Parliament. It was abolished in 2003.

The electorate was created in 1981 by the Constitution Amendment (No. 9) Act 1980-1981 and covered "The islands comprising New Zealand and all other areas outside the Cook Islands". It was established to provide representation for the growing number of Cook Islanders temporarily living abroad, especially in New Zealand, who previously had had to fly home to vote. At the time it was created, roughly 24,000 Cook Islanders lived overseas, versus 22,000 in the Cook Islands, and their votes had been crucial in deciding the 1978 election. The creation of a specific seat was seen as a way of both providing for and limiting their influence.

At the time of the electorates' creation, roughly 20,000 Cook Islanders lived in New Zealand, as many as lived in the Cook Islands themselves. However, only a few hundred were expected to be eligible to vote. At the 1983 election, 750 Cook islanders registered to vote in New Zealand.

The electorate was always controversial. The constitutional amendment creating it was the target of a legal challenge. The first person elected to it, Fanaura Kingstone, had planned to resign from it the day after she was elected. She changed her mind when she was appointed to Cabinet. Cook Islanders voted on its future as part of the 1994 Cook Islands referendum but voted to retain it by 56 to 43 percent. In 2002 2,000 people signed a petition calling for its abolition, along with other reforms; the same year a survey on Rarotonga found strong support for abolition.

In April 2003 the Cook Islands Parliament passed the Constitution Amendment (No. 26) Act 2003 abolishing the seat. A savings clause allowed the incumbent, Joe Williams, to retain his seat until the end of the Parliamentary term.

== Members of Parliament ==
Election	Member	Party
1983 (Mar)	Fanaura Kingstone	Cook Islands Party
1983 (Nov), 1989	Iaveta Arthur	Democratic Party
1994, 1999	Joe Williams	Cook Islands Party
