= Bonoufla =

- Village
- Location in Ivory Coast
- Coordinates: 7°8′N 6°29′W
- Country: Ivory Coast
- District: Sassandra-Marahoué
- Region: Haut-Sassandra
- Department: Vavoua
- Sub-prefecture: Vavoua

Population (2014 census)
  - Viĺlage: 23,467
- Time zone: UTC+0 (GMT)

Bonoufla is a village in west-central Ivory Coast. It is located in the sub-prefecture of Vavoua, Vavoua Department, Haut-Sassandra Region, Sassandra-Marahoué District.

Bonoufla was a commune until March 2012, when it became one of 1,126 communes nationwide that were abolished.
