= 2024 Penrhyn by-election =

Election in the Cook Islands

A by-election was held in the Cook Islands electorate of Penrhyn on 12 March 2024. The by-election was triggered by the conviction of MP Robert Tapaitau for fraud in January 2024. The by-election was won by Sarakura Tapaitau.

The Cook Islands United Party announced that it would not stand a candidate. The Cook Islands Party announced that it had selected Vaine Iriano Wichman. Other candidates were Meremere Arake Tonitara for the Democratic Party, and Sarakura Tapaitau and Tangata Andrew Vaeau as independents.

113 voters were registered for the poll.

== Results ==
2024 Penrhyn by-election
Party	Candidate	Votes	%	±%
Independent	Sarakura Tapaitau	37	34.3	
Cook Islands	Vaine Wichman	34	31.5	
Democratic	Meremere Arake Tonitara	20	18.5	
Independent	Tangata Andrew Vaeau	17	15.7	
Majority		3		
Turnout		108	95.6	
Independent hold		Swing		
