= Robert Tapaitau =

Cook Islands politician

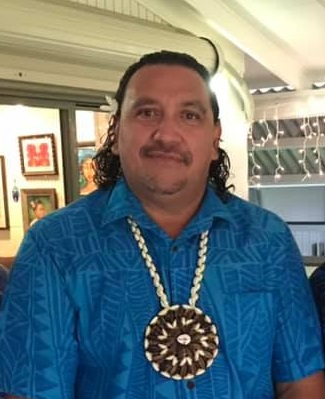
- Robert Tapaitau in 2020

Deputy Prime Minister of the Cook Islands
- In office 1 October 2020 (Note: Suspended from 6 October 2021 — 17 May 2022) – 31 January 2024
- Prime Minister: Mark Brown
- Preceded by: Mark Brown
- Succeeded by: Albert Nicholas

Minister of Energy and Renewable Energy
- In office 2 June 2021 – 31 January 2024
- Prime Minister: Mark Brown
- Preceded by: Mark Brown

Minister of Outer Islands
- In office 2 June 2021 – 31 January 2024
- Prime Minister: Mark Brown
- Preceded by: Mark Brown

Minister of Marine Resources
- In office 2 June 2021 – 31 January 2024
- Prime Minister: Mark Brown
- Preceded by: Mark Brown
- Succeeded by: Tingika Elikana

Minister of Infrastructure & Planning
- In office 10 July 2018 – 6 October 2021
- Prime Minister: Henry Puna; Mark Brown
- Preceded by: Teariki Heather
- Succeeded by: Albert Nicholas

Minister of National Environment Services
- In office 20 September 2018 – 6 October 2021
- Preceded by: Kiriau Turepu
- Succeeded by: Albert Nicholas

Member of the Cook Islands Parliament for Penrhyn
- In office 14 June 2018 – 31 January 2024
- Preceded by: Willie John
- Succeeded by: Sarakura Tapaitau

Personal details
- Born: 10 March 1974 (age 52)
- Party: Independent

Robert Taimoe Tapaitau (born 10 March 1974) is a former Cook Islands politician, Cabinet Minister, and Deputy Prime Minister of the Cook Islands who was convicted of fraud and jailed in 2024. He is the son of former Democratic party cabinet minister Tepure Tapaitau.

Tapaitau was born on Rarotonga and educated at Avarua School and Tereora College. He has previously lived in Australia and worked as a builder. He was first elected in the seat of Penrhyn at the 2018 election. Following the election he decided to back the Cook Islands Party government of Henry Puna, and was appointed to Cabinet as Minister of Infrastructure, Environmental Services, Transport, and Outer Islands Special Projects.

On 1 October 2020, following the retirement of Henry Puna, he was appointed Deputy Prime Minister. He retained all his Cabinet portfolios. A further reshuffle in June 2021 saw him gain responsibility for Energy, Renewable Energy, Marine Resources and the Outer islands.

On 7 October 2021 Tapaitau stepped aside as a Minister after being charged with conspiracy to defraud. On 17 May 2022 he was reinstated as Deputy Prime Minister and to most of his portfolios, but stripped of his responsibility for the National Environment Services and Infrastructure Cook Islands to avoid a conflict of interest with his ongoing criminal trial.

He was re-elected at the 2022 Cook Islands general election. He was stripped of his portfolios again on 12 June 2023 when his criminal trial began.

On 31 January 2024 he was convicted of three charges of using a document to obtain a pecuniary advantage and one charge of conspiracy to defraud. He lost his seat in parliament as a result of his conviction, triggering the 2024 Penrhyn by-election. In March 2024 he was sentenced to two years and nine months imprisonment.

While in prison he was employed as a project manager for renovations at the Tongareva hostel.
