= Sarakura Tapaitau =

Member of the Cook Islands Parliament for Penrhyn
- In office 2024–2026
- Preceded by: Robert Tapaitau
- Succeeded by: Vaine Wichman

Personal details
- Party: Independent

Sarakura Tapaitau is a Cook Islands politician and member of the Cook Islands Parliament. She was first elected to parliament in the 2024 Penrhyn by-election.

Tapaitau ran unsuccessfully for re-election at the 2026 general election.

Tapaitau is married to former MP Robert Tapaitau.
