= Agnes Armstrong =

Cook Islands politician

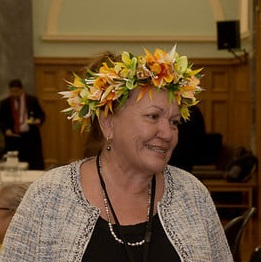
- Agnes Armstrong in 2019

Member of the Cook Islands Parliament for Ivirua
- Incumbent
- Assumed office 21 January 2019
- Preceded by: Tony Armstrong

Personal details
- Born: 10 June 1959 (age 67)
- Party: Cook Islands Democratic Party (–2026); Independent (2026–)
- Spouse: Tony Armstrong

Agnes Helen Armstrong (born 10 June 1959) is a Cook Islands politician and member of the Cook Islands Parliament. She is an independent, having previously been a member of the Cook Islands Democratic Party.

Armstrong is from Rarotonga and was educated at Nikao Side School and Tereora College. She worked as a seafood retailer, shipping agent, and for Air New Zealand. She moved to Mangaia in 2016 to start an orchard. Her husband contested the 2017 Ivirua by-election following the retirement of Jim Marurai and was elected to Parliament. Following his death in 2018 she contested the resulting 2019 Ivirua by-election and was elected in his place. Shortly after the election, she attended the UNDP's Pacific Women in Power Forum with other female Cook Island's MP's.

In December 2019 she was part of a protest by women MPs to permit the wearing of ei katu (floral crowns) in Parliament. In February 2020 she was appointed spokesperson for Internal Affairs, and Outer Islands Special Projects. In April 2020 Armstrong voluntarily took a 15% pay cut to help her constituents during the COVID-19 pandemic. In June of that year she advocated for tariffs on imported fruit and vegetables to encourage local production.

She was re-elected at the 2022 Cook Islands general election. Armstrong won her Ivirua seat uncontested in the 2026 general election, where she ran as an independent. Following the election she agreed to support the government alongside other Mangaia MPs.
