= 2012 Titikaveka by-election =

Election in the Cook Islands

- 13 April 2012

Constituency of Titikaveka
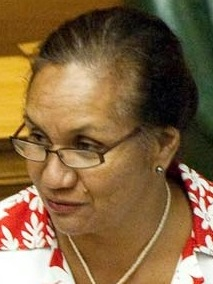
	First party	Second party	Third party
		CIP	Ind.
Candidate	Selina Napa	Teariki Matenga	Teava Iro
Party	Democratic	Cook Islands	Independent
Popular vote	297	283	104
Percentage	43.4%	41.4%	15.2%
MP before election
Robert Wigmore
Cook Islands
Elected MP
Selina Napa
Democratic

A by-election was held in the Cook Islands electorate of Titikaveka on 21 June 2012. The by-election was precipitated by the death of sitting MP Robert Wigmore on 13 April 2012.

The election was contested by three candidates, two of whom were siblings. It was won by the Democratic party's Selina Napa.

Titikaveka by-election 2012
Party	Candidate	Votes	%	±%
Democratic	Selina Napa	297	43.4%	
Cook Islands	Teariki Matenga	283	41.4%	
Independent	Teava Iro	104	15.2%	
Turnout		684		

== Aftermath ==
On 5 July, Teariki Matenga challenged the result, questioning the eligibility of 20 voters. The petition was withdrawn in August.
