= Kétro-Bassam =

- Town and sub-prefecture
- Location in Ivory Coast
- Coordinates: 7°11′N 6°38′W
- Country: Ivory Coast
- District: Sassandra-Marahoué
- Region: Haut-Sassandra
- Department: Vavoua

Population (2014)
  - Total: 24,934
- Time zone: UTC+0 (GMT)

Kétro-Bassam is a town in west-central Ivory Coast. It is a sub-prefecture of Vavoua Department in Haut-Sassandra Region, Sassandra-Marahoué District.

Kétro-Bassam was a commune until March 2012, when it became one of 1,126 communes nationwide that were abolished.

In 2014, the population of the sub-prefecture of Kétro-Bassam was 24,934.

== Villages ==
The five villages of the sub-prefecture of Kétro-Bassam and their population in 2014 are:

1. Brouafla-Kouya (3,294)
2. Dediafla (6,080)
3. Ketro (4,789)
4. Ketro Bassam (7,938)
5. Kouleyo (2,833)
