= 2002 Penrhyn by-election =

Election in the Cook Islands

The Penrhyn by-election was a by-election in the Cook Islands electorate of Penrhyn. It was held on 27 June 2002, and was precipitated by the disqualification of Tepure Tapaitau.

The poll was won by the Cook Islands Party's Wilkie Rasmussen.

Penrhyn by-election 2002
Party	Candidate	Votes	%	±%
Cook Islands	Wilkie Rasmussen	104	51.0	
Independent	Tepure Tapaitau	100	49.0	
Turnout		204		
