= 2017 Avatiu–Ruatonga–Palmerston by-election =

Election in the Cook Islands

- 17 May 2017
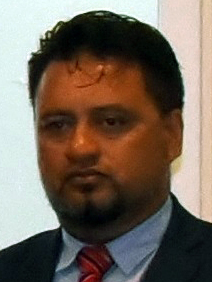
		DP
Nominee	Albert Nicholas	Teina Rongo
Party	Cook Islands	Democratic
Popular vote	346	182
Percentage	62.34%	32.79%
MP before election
Albert Nicholas
Cook Islands
Elected MP
Albert Nicholas
Cook Islands

A by-election was held in the Cook Islands constituency of Avatiu–Ruatonga–Palmerston on 17 May 2017. The by-election was precipitated by the resignation of Albert Nicholas. It was won by Albert Nicholas.

== Background ==
In the July 2014 general election the contest for Avatiu–Ruatonga–Palmerston (or "RAPPA") saw sitting Cook Islands Party MP John Henry unseated by the Democratic Party challenger Albert Nicholas. Following the election, Nicholas switched his support to the government of Henry Puna in exchange for a position in cabinet. He was subsequently expelled from the Democratic Party. Continued controversy about the ethics of "vaka-jumping" saw him resign his seat in April 2017 in an effort to gain a new mandate.

Nicholas was selected as the Cook Islands Party candidate, a decision which saw former CIP candidate John Henry run as an independent. The Democrats selected Teina Rongo, a former public servant.

The election was won by Albert Nicholas.

== Results ==
Candidate	Party	Votes	%
Albert Nicholas	Cook Islands Party	346	62.34
Teina Rongo	Democratic Party	182	32.79
John Henry	Independent	27	4.86
Total		555	100.00
