= Anthony Toruariki Armstrong =

Tony Armstrong

Member of the Cook Islands Parliament for Ivirua
- In office 17 August 2017 – 15 November 2018
- Preceded by: Jim Marurai
- Succeeded by: Agnes Armstrong

Personal details
- Born: 18 September 1957 Auckland, New Zealand
- Died: 15 November 2018
- Party: Cook Islands Democratic Party
- Spouse: Agnes Armstrong

Anthony Toruariki Armstrong (18 September 1957 – 15 November 2018) was a Cook Islands politician and member of the Cook Islands Parliament. He was a member of the Cook Islands Democratic Party.

Armstrong was born in Auckland, New Zealand and educated at Tereora College. He worked as a fisherman, seafood retailer and shipping agent. In 2012 he was appointed to the committee of the Punanga Nui Market. He moved to Mangaia in 2016 to start an orchard. When former Prime Minister Jim Marurai announced his retirement, he ran for the seat and was elected at the 2017 Ivirua by-election. He was re-elected at the 2018 election.

Armstrong died in November 2018. His wife Agnes won the resulting 2019 Ivirua by-election and was elected to Parliament. After his death a fishing competition was established in his memory.
