= Dananon =

- Town and sub-prefecture
- Location in Ivory Coast
- Coordinates: 7°37′N 6°22′W
- Country: Ivory Coast
- District: Sassandra-Marahoué
- Region: Haut-Sassandra
- Department: Vavoua

Population (2014)
  - Total: 31,384
- Time zone: UTC+0 (GMT)

Dananon is a town in west-central Ivory Coast. It is a sub-prefecture of Vavoua Department in Haut-Sassandra Region, Sassandra-Marahoué District.

Dananon was a commune until March 2012, when it became one of 1,126 communes nationwide that were abolished.

In 2014, the population of the sub-prefecture of Dananon was 31,384.

== Villages ==
The 19 villages of the sub-prefecture of Dananon and their population in 2014 are:

1. Bandiahi (1,552)
2. Bazra - Gottron (563)
3. Bénoufla (2,923)
4. Bita (534)
5. Bodouasso (3,433)
6. Botifla (1,598)
7. Dananon (3,911)
8. Dézra (1,172)
9. Dimata (869)
10. Dubasso (908)
11. Gouétifla (2,234)
12. Gozi (1,298)
13. Kouénoufla-Gottron (971)
14. Pata (366)
15. Sénoufla (510)
16. Sobédoufla (2,339)
17. Trafla-Gottron (1,958)
18. Yogonon (2,891)
19. Zézra (1,354)
