= 2019 Ivirua by-election =

Election in the Cook Islands

A by-election was held in the Cook Islands constituency of Ivirua on 21 January 2019. The by-election was called following the death of sitting MP Tony Armstrong.

The election was contested by four candidates: Agnes Armstrong, wife of former MP Tony Armstrong, for the Democratic Party; former deputy Prime Minister Teariki Heather for the Cook Islands United Party, Daryl Rairi for the Cook Islands Party, and independent Jason Teremoana. The by-election was won by Agnes Armstrong.

== Results ==
Candidate	Party	Votes	%
Agnes Armstrong	Democratic Party	48	57.83
Daryl Elima Rairi	Cook Islands Party	30	36.14
Teariki Heather	Cook Islands United Party	4	4.82
Jason Tangi Teremoana	Independent	1	1.20
Total		83	100.00
