= Fanaura Kingstone =

Cook Islands politician

Minister of Internal Affairs
- In office 1983–1983
- Prime Minister: Geoffrey Henry

Member of the Cook Islands Parliament for Overseas
- In office 30 March 1983 – 2 November 1983
- Preceded by: None (electorate created)
- Succeeded by: Iaveta Arthur

Personal details
- Party: Cook Islands Party

Fanaura Kimiora Kingstone QSO (born 1940) is a Cook Islands former politician and Cabinet Minister. In 1983 she became the second woman elected to the Parliament of the Cook Islands, and the first appointed to Cabinet.

Kingstone was born in Arutanga on the island of Aitutaki. At the age of six her family moved to Rarotonga so her father could study at Takamoa Theological College. She was educated at Taranaki Diocesan School for Girls (then known as St Mary's Diocesan School) in Stratford, New Zealand, then at New Plymouth Girls' High School and Ardmore Teachers' Training College in Auckland. After teaching in New Zealand for two years, she returned to Rarotonga where she taught at Avarua School.

She married Colin Kingstone and in 1964 moved to Niue and taught at Niue High School (where her husband was principal). When he died in 1969 she returned to New Zealand and taught at South Wellington Intermediate. In 1976 she helped organise the inaugural conference of the Pacific Women's Council, later P.A.C.I.F.I.C.A. She ran for a seat on the Wellington City Council in the 1977 Wellington City mayoral election. In 1978 she was appointed to the New Zealand Equal Opportunities Panel. She then moved to Tokoroa to teach at Kawerau Intermediate School.

Kingstone was elected to the Cook Islands Parliament as a Cook Islands Party candidate in the Overseas electorate in the March 1983 Cook Islands general election. She had opposed the creation of the Overseas electorate and promised to resign immediately if elected. She changed her mind after she was appointed to Cabinet as Minister of Internal Affairs and Postmistress General, becoming the first woman to hold a cabinet seat. She lost her seat and her Cabinet portfolios in the November 1983 Cook Islands general election.

After leaving Parliament Kingstone returned to New Zealand. She later moved to Port Vila, Vanuatu and worked for the United Nations Economic and Social Commission for Asia and the Pacific and as president of the Vanuatu Netball Association. She later worked as a Women's Development Advisor for the South Pacific Commission. She later worked with former New Zealand MP Marilyn Waring at the Centre for Asia-Pacific Women in Politics and at the United Nations Development Fund for Women. In 2002 she was appointed to the National Advisory Council of the New Zealand Human Rights Commission, where she helped develop a human rights action plan.

== Recognition ==
In the 1986 Queen's Birthday Honours, Kingstone was appointed a Companion of the Queen's Service Order for public services.

In September 2018, Kingstone was keynote speaker at a New Zealand Cook Islands community event marking 125 years of Women's suffrage in New Zealand.

In October 2019, Kingstone was inducted into the hall of fame at the inaugural Vaine Rangatira awards for Cook Islands women.
