= VAO =

VAO may mean:

- Eastern Administrative Okrug of Moscow, Russia
- Vertex Arrays Object, an OpenGL feature similar to Vertex Buffer Object (VBO)
- Vienna Art Orchestra, a European jazz group
- VAO (sports club), a Greek sports club
- IATA airport code for Suavanao Airport

== See also ==
- Vao (disambiguation)
