= Sonny Williams (politician) =

Cook Islands politician

Member of the Cook Islands Parliament for Titikaveka
- Incumbent
- Assumed office 1 August 2022
- Preceded by: Selina Napa

Personal details
- Party: Cook Islands Party

Sonny Williams is a Cook Islands politician and member of the Cook Islands Parliament. He is a member of the Cook Islands Party.

Williams worked as a civil servant and served as Cultural Development Secretary for the Cook Islands Government. In June 2019 he moved to Infrastructure Cook Islands to work as director for projects and planning. He was first elected to parliament at the 2022 Cook Islands general election, winning the seat of Titikaveka by just three votes. He was confirmed as an MP following an election petition on 11 March 2023.

Williams won re-election at the 2026 general election.
