= Jalla =

Jalla may refer to:

- Jalla! Jalla!, a 2000 Swedish comedy film directed by Josef Fares
- Jalla (bug), an insect genus in the subfamily Asopinae
- "Jalla" (song), Cyprus's entry at the Eurovision Song Contest 2026

== See also ==
- Yalla (disambiguation)
- Jalla Jalaluhu ('May his glory be glorified'), an honorific often said or written alongside Allah
- "Jalla Dansa Sawa", a 2013 song by Behrang Miri
