= Willie John =

Member of the Cook Islands Parliament for Penrhyn
- In office 9 July 2014 – 14 June 2018
- Preceded by: Wilkie Rasmussen
- Succeeded by: Robert Tapaitau

Personal details
- Party: Cook Islands Party

Willie John is a Cook Islands politician and former member of the Cook Islands Parliament. He is a member of the Cook Islands Party.

John ran as an independent in the 2010 Cook Islands general election, but was narrowly defeated by Democratic Party candidate Wilkie Rasmussen. From 2012 to 2013 he was the executive officer for Penrhyn atoll. As executive officer, he lived in Rarotonga rather than relocating to the atoll. He resigned in order to contest the 2014 election. John ran as a candidate for the Cook Islands Party and was elected to Parliament. He was subsequently appointed Leader of the House.

He was not re-elected at the 2018 election.
