= Bazra-Nattis =

- Town and sub-prefecture
- Location in Ivory Coast
- Coordinates: 7°36′N 6°31′W
- Country: Ivory Coast
- District: Sassandra-Marahoué
- Region: Haut-Sassandra
- Department: Vavoua

Population (2014)
  - Total: 39,218
- Time zone: UTC+0 (GMT)

Bazra-Nattis is a town in west-central Ivory Coast. It is a sub-prefecture of Vavoua Department in Haut-Sassandra Region, Sassandra-Marahoué District.

Bazra-Nattis was a commune until March 2012, when it became one of 1,126 communes nationwide that were abolished.

In 2014, the population of the sub-prefecture of Bazra-Nattis was 39,218.

== Villages ==
The 12 villages of the sub-prefecture of Bazra-Nattis and their population in 2014 are:

1. Bazra - Nattis (7,351)
2. Brouafla - Nattis (1,371)
3. Deragon (1,661)
4. Goulaonfla (1,888)
5. Gouriela (4,404)
6. Tenefero (2,269)
7. Tiahouo (2,356)
8. Toutouman (1,773)
9. Trafla Nattis (1,106)
10. Vrouo 1 (6,675)
11. Vrouo 2 (6,992)
12. Yuala (1,372)
