= 2013 Murienua by-election =

Election in the Cook Islands

A by-election was held in the Cook Islands electorate of Murienua on 19 September 2013. The by-election was precipitated by the resignation of sitting MP Tom Marsters following his appointment as Queen's Representative.

Planning for the by-election began immediately following the announcement of Marsters' appointment. Initially the by-election was expected to happen in August, but it was later delayed until September.

The election was contested by two candidates: the Cook Islands Party's Kaota Tuariki and the Democratic Party's James Beer. It was won by Tuariki.

Murienua by-election 2013
| Party | Candidate | Votes | % | ±% |
|---|---|---|---|---|
| Cook Islands | Kaota Tuariki | 219 | 53.0% | |
| Democratic | James Beer | 194 | 47.0% | |
| Turnout | | 413 | 79.9% | |

== Aftermath ==
Allegations of electoral fraud, including late campaigning and treating, were raised shortly after the by-election. On 1 October the Democratic party lodged an election petition. A formal hearing of the petition was pre-empted by Tuariki's resignation, precipitating the 2014 Murienua by-election.

Following his resignation, the Democratic party lodged a complaint of bribery and treating against Tuariki with police.
