= Yalla-y-Poora =

Yalla-y-Poora may refer to:

- Yalla-y-Poora, a town in Shire of Pyrenees, Victoria, Australia
- Yalla-y-Poora, a painting by Eugene von Guerard
- Yalla-Y-Poora, a historic homestead in the Rural City of Ararat, Victoria, Australia
