= James Beer =

Cook Islands politician

Member of the Cook Islands Parliament for Murienua
- In office 19 February 2014 – 14 June 2018
- Preceded by: Tom Marsters
- Succeeded by: Patrick Arioka

Personal details
- Party: Cook Islands Democratic Party

James Beer is a Cook Islands politician and former member of the Cook Islands Parliament. He is a member of the Cook Islands Democratic Party.

Beer is a businessman and owner of grocery chain Manea Foods. He is also a renewable energy advocate.

Beer ran as the Democratic party candidate for Murienua in the 2010 Cook Islands general election but was unsuccessful. Following the resignation of incumbent Tom Marsters he ran again in the 2013 Murienua by-election, but lost to the Cook Islands Party's Kaota Tuariki. Tuariki subsequently resigned after an electoral petition alleged he had won the seat by bribery, and both candidates contested a second by-election in 2014 in which Beer was elected. He was subsequently appointed party spokesperson on economic development, trade and energy. During his term as deputy leader of the Opposition, Beer was nominated by Parliament to be the Deputy Chair of the Crimes Bill Committee and was also Deputy Chair of PAC-The Public Accounts Committee, providing oversight on Government expenditure and holding inquiries on unauthorized expenditure. He was re-elected in the 2014 Cook Islands general election. In 2015 he unsuccessfully contested the Democratic Party leadership, losing to William (Smiley) Heather. later that year he was one of a group of Arorangi who opposed a local same-sex couple renewing their vows on Arorangi beach.

He was not re-elected at the 2018 election.

Beer again ran for parliament as an independent candidate in the Mauke electorate at the 2026 general election, but was unsuccessful.
