= Wilkie Rasmussen =

Cook Islands politician

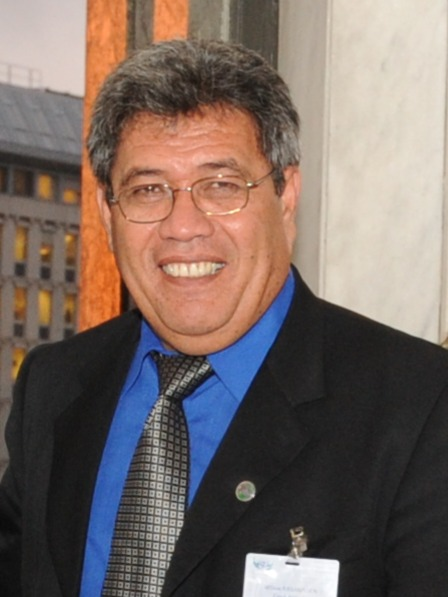
- Rasmussen at the Convention on Cluster Munitions

Attorney-General
- In office 6 January 2010 – 17 November 2010
- Prime Minister: Jim Marurai
- Preceded by: Terepai Maoate
- Succeeded by: Henry Puna

Minister of Finance & Economic Management
- In office 6 January 2010 – 17 November 2010
- Preceded by: Terepai Maoate
- Succeeded by: Mark Brown

Minister of Foreign Affairs
- In office 12 September 2005 – 28 July 2009
- Preceded by: Tom Marsters
- Succeeded by: Robert Wigmore

Minister of Tourism
- In office 3 May 2005 – 28 July 2009
- Preceded by: Piho Rua
- Succeeded by: Robert Wigmore

Member of the Cook Islands Parliament for Penrhyn (electorate)
- In office 27 June 2002 – 9 July 2014
- Preceded by: Tepure Tapaitau
- Succeeded by: Willie John

Personal details
- Born: Wilkie Olaf Patua Rasmussen; March 21, 1958 (age 68) Omoka, Penrhyn Atoll, Cook Islands
- Party: Cook Islands Party; Cook Islands Democratic Party

Wilkie Olaf Patua Rasmussen (born 21 March 1958) is a Cook Islands politician and former Cabinet Minister. From 2013 to 2015 he was leader of the Cook Islands Democratic Party.

== Early life ==
Rasmussen was born in Omoka on Penrhyn Island. He attended the University of Auckland, graduating with a Bachelor of Arts, Master of Arts, and Bachelor of Laws. After practising as a barrister and solicitor, he became Secretary to the Cook Islands Cabinet, then High Commissioner to New Zealand from 2000 to 2002.

== Political career ==
Rasmussen first stood for Parliament in 1985, contesting the seat of Penrhyn after Tangaroa Tangaroa resigned to become Queen's Representative. He ran again as a candidate for the Democratic Alliance in the 1999 election, but was unsuccessful. In 2002 he resigned as High Commissioner to New Zealand to contest the 2002 Penrhyn by-election as Cook Islands Party candidate, and was elected.

Early in his political career he challenged the eligibility of two Government MPs to sit, on the grounds that they worked as paid consultants and were therefore public servants. The challenge was ultimately unsuccessful.

== Cabinet ==
After being narrowly re-elected in the 2004 election, Rasmussen was brought into the coalition Cabinet of Jim Marurai, replacing Piho Rua as Minister of Culture and Tourism. He was later elevated to foreign minister. He switched his allegiance to the Democratic Party shortly before the 2006 elections, and as a result was elected unopposed. He was elected deputy leader of the Democratic Party in August 2007, replacing Tepure Tapaitau. In July 2008 he was nominated for the position of Secretary-General of the Pacific Islands Forum, but was unsuccessful.

In December 2008 he agitated for both Prime Minister Jim Marurai and his deputy Terepai Maoate to step down. On 28 July 2009 he was sacked for "disloyalty" by Marurai, and subsequently expelled from Cook Islands Democratic Party on 25 August 2009. He was reappointed to Cabinet as Minister of Finance & Economic Management and Attorney-General in the December 2009 reshuffle following the sacking of Terepai Maoate and resignation of Democratic party cabinet ministers. A Democratic Party conference in June 2010 restored his membership and appointed him deputy leader.

Rasmussen was co-president of the ACP-EU Joint Parliamentary Assembly until December 2009, when he was replaced by Charles Milupi of (Zambia).

He was re-elected at the 2010 election. He became Leader of the Opposition in February 2012 after Democratic party leader Robert Wigmore was granted medical leave from Parliament. Following Wigmore's death in April 2012 he became acting leader of the Democratic Party. His position as party leader was confirmed in August 2012.

Rasmussen was defeated at the 2014 election, and stepped down as Democratic Party leader in April 2015.

== Post-retirement ==
Following his retirement from politics Rasmussen worked as a lawyer. On 11 June 2021 he was convicted of two counts of indecent assault and one of perverting the course of justice. In August 2021 he was fined $7000. He was later disbarred as a lawyer.
