= Tekaotiki Matapo =

Cook Islands politician

Tekaotiki Matapo OBE
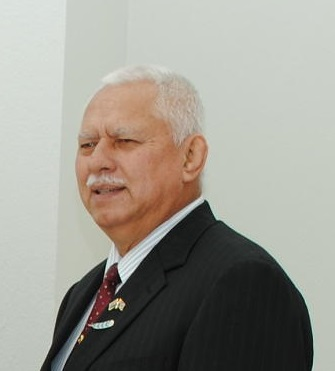
- Tekaotiki Matapo in 2011

Personal details
- Born: April 16, 1944 (age 82) Rarotonga, Cook Islands
- Education: Titikaveka School, Avarua Primary School, Tereora College
- Occupation: Politician, diplomat, police officer
- Known for: Minister of Justice (1989–1999), High Commissioner to New Zealand (2011–2015), President of the Cook Islands Party (2018–)
- Awards: Officer of the Order of the British Empire (2022)

Tekaotiki Matapo OBE (born 16 April 1944) is a Cook Islands former politician, Cabinet Minister, and diplomat. He is currently president of the Cook Islands Party.

== Early career ==
Matapo was born in Rarotonga and educated at Titikaveka School, Avarua primary School, and Tereora College. He joined the Cook Islands Police Service in 1962, later rising to the rank of inspector. He also served as a national representative in athletics, captain of the Cook Islands national rugby union team, and as president of the Cook Islands Sports and National Olympic Committee.

== Politics career ==
Matapo was first elected to the Parliament of the Cook Islands in the 1989 Cook Islands general election. He was Minister of Justice of the Cook Islands from 1989 to 1999, (1989-1999) serving in the cabinets of Tom Davis and Pupuke Robati.

From 2011 to December 2015 served as High Commissioner of the Cook Islands to New Zealand, being replaced by Teremoana Yala.

In August 2018 he was appointed president of the Cook Islands Party.

Matapo was made an Officer of the Order of the British Empire in the 2022 Birthday Honours.
