= Teremoana Yala =

Cook Island activist and diplomat

Teremoana Yala, after being presented with the MNZM for services to the Cook Islands community

Teremoana Yala MNZM is a Cook Island activist and diplomat. She was Chief Administration Officer for the Cook Islands High Commission in Wellington, and then was the first woman to serve as Cook Islands High Commissioner to New Zealand. Yala is an active supporter of Cook Islands languages, and in 2022 was appointed a Member of the New Zealand Order of Merit for services to the Cook Islands community.

== Biography ==
Yala worked as Chief Administration Officer for the Cook Islands High Commission in Wellington, New Zealand for 14 years. In 2016, she was appointed as the Cook Islands High Commissioner to New Zealand, succeeding Tekaotiki Matapo. Yala was not the first woman to be appointed to the position as Te Tika Mataiapo Dorice Reid was appointed in 2011 but passed away before assuming her appointment. Yala is the first woman to have taken up the office.

Yala attended the inaugural gathering of representatives from the Association of Southeast Asian Nations (ASEAN) community and the Pacific Islands Heads of Mission group (PIHOM) in Wellington, New Zealand.

Yala has encouraged Māori to embrace Cook Island language dialects, including promoting Cook Islands language week and co-producing the educational language film project E Reo Nuku. She has also helped revive the Cook Islands Manawatu Association, started a weekly Tivaevae group for Cook Islands women and supported the establishment of a World War I Pacific war memorial.

In May 2022, Yala was appointed as a Member of the New Zealand Order of Merit (MNZM) for "services to the Cook Islands community."
