= 2007 Titikaveka by-election =

Election in the Cook Islands

The Titikaveka by-election was a by-election in the Cook Islands seat of Titikaveka. It took place on 7 February 2007.

At the 2006 election, Robert Wigmore won the seat of Titikaveka by a significant margin. However, his election was subsequently challenged in an electoral petition on the grounds that as a board member of the Cook Islands Investment Corporation Wigmore was technically a public servant and thus ineligible to sit. The petition was successful and a by-election was called.

The poll was won by the Democratic Party's Robert Wigmore. Turnout was significantly reduced from the general election.

Titikaveka by-election 2007
Party	Candidate	Votes	%	±%
Democratic	Robert Wigmore	285	49.8	
Cook Islands	Tiki Matapo	260	45.5	
Independent	Vaine Rasmussen	27	4.7	
Turnout		572		
