= Vaine Wichman =

Cook Islands politician and development economist

Vaine Iriano Wichman
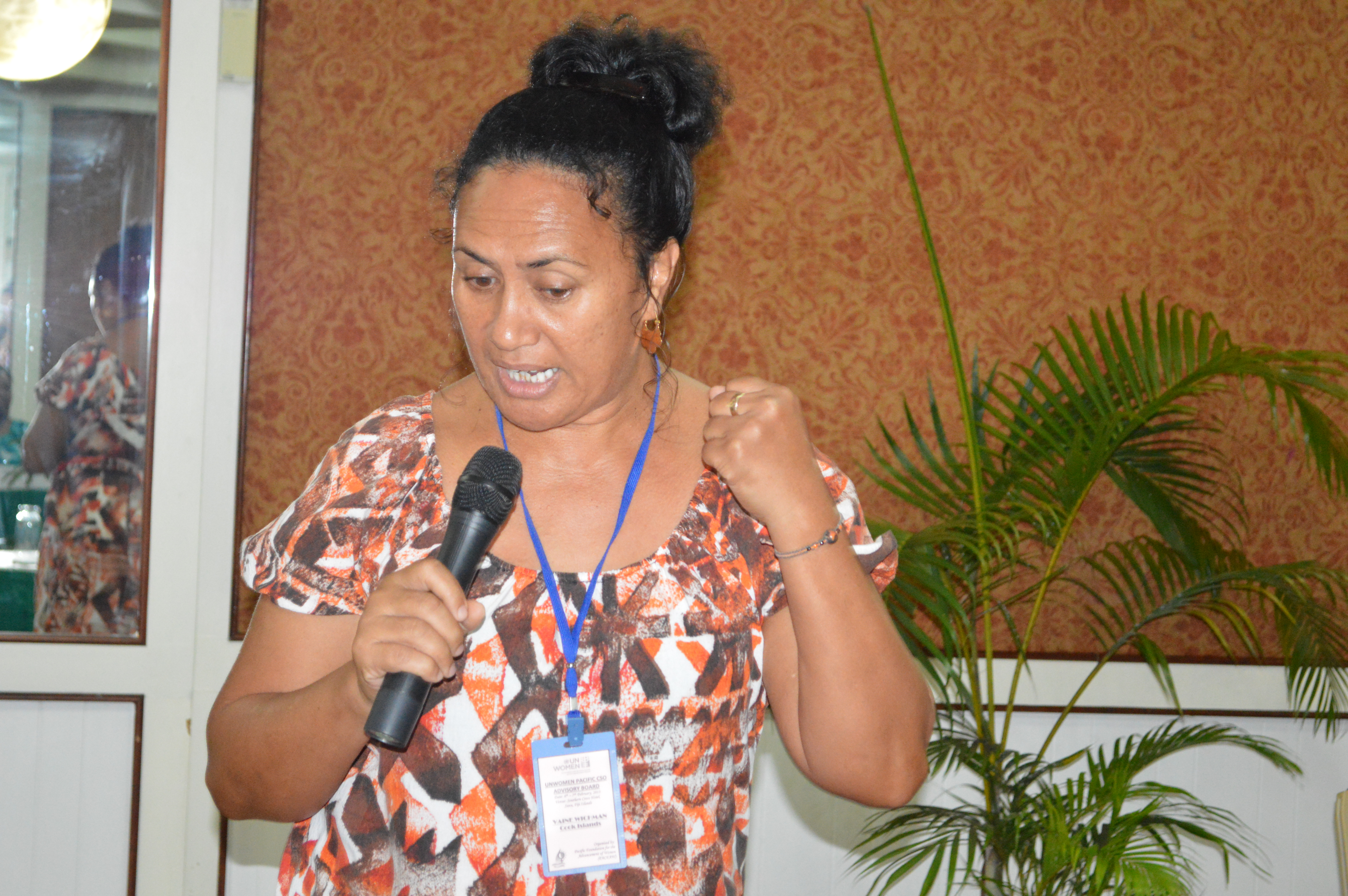

Member of the Cook Islands Parliament for Ruaau
- In office 2004–2006
- Preceded by: Geoffrey Heather
- Succeeded by: William (Smiley) Heather

Member of the Cook Islands Parliament for Penrhyn
- Incumbent
- Assumed office 2026
- Preceded by: Sarakura Tapaitau

Personal details
- Education: University of Bradford, Harvard Kennedy School

Vaine Iriano Wichman is a Cook Islands politician and development economist. She is a member of the Cook Islands Party.

== Background ==
Wichman received her MSc in Development Economics from the University of Bradford in 1987. In 2006, she attended the Leaders in Development course at the Harvard Kennedy School.

== Career ==
From 2004 to 2006 Wichman was a member of the 11th Cook Islands Parliament, representing Ruaau. She won with 55.1% of the votes. She ran in the 2003 by-election for Ruaau, but was defeated by Geoffrey Heather.

As a member of parliament, Vaine’s work included reviewing the Property Law Act of the Cook Islands, reviewing the Civil List entitlements of Parliamentarians, revising the Unit Titles Bill of the Cook Islands and reviewing the public spending of Crown Agencies. She also worked as an Associate Minister of Finance and oversighted the preparation of the Government’s budgets in 2005 and 2006.

In 2012 Wichman was re-elected to a second term as President of the Cook Islands National Council of Women (CINCW).

As a development economist Wichman has produced a number of reports for the Asian Development Bank including:

- Revamping the Cook Islands Public Sector (2008)
- Making Things Simpler?: Harmonizing Aid Delivery in the Cook Islands (2008)

She is also the author of From Words to Wheelbarrows: the Nukuroa Revolving Fund and Fishing for Answers: Socio-economic Assessment of the Rarotonga Game and Small Scale Fishing Industry.

Wichman was the Cook Islands In-Country Co-ordinator for the University of the South Pactific EU Climate Change programme from 2011 to 2017.

Wichman won re-election to parliament at the 2026 general election as a Cook Islands Party candidate in the Penrhyn electorate.
