= Yalla (journal) =

Journal focusing on humanizing the Israeli–Palestinian conflict

Yalla was a journal focusing on humanizing the Israeli–Palestinian conflict by encouraging creative expression. It was a collaboration between young Canadian Arabs and Jews, distributed worldwide. Yalla published three journals, in 2004, 2005 and 2007.

The Yalla project was a not-for-profit international initiative aimed at stimulating dialogue and demonstrating the human side of the Israeli–Palestinian conflict from the perspective of mainly Jewish and Arab youth. The project began as a literary journal by students at McGill University in 2004. Yalla brought together poetry, short stories, essays, art, music and photography of Arab and Jewish youth.

The title of the journal is derived from the Arabic origin slang word "Yalla" (also spelled “Yallah”) (Arabic: يلا), meaning "Let's Go!"
