= Selina Napa =

Cook Islands politician

Selina Napa MBE
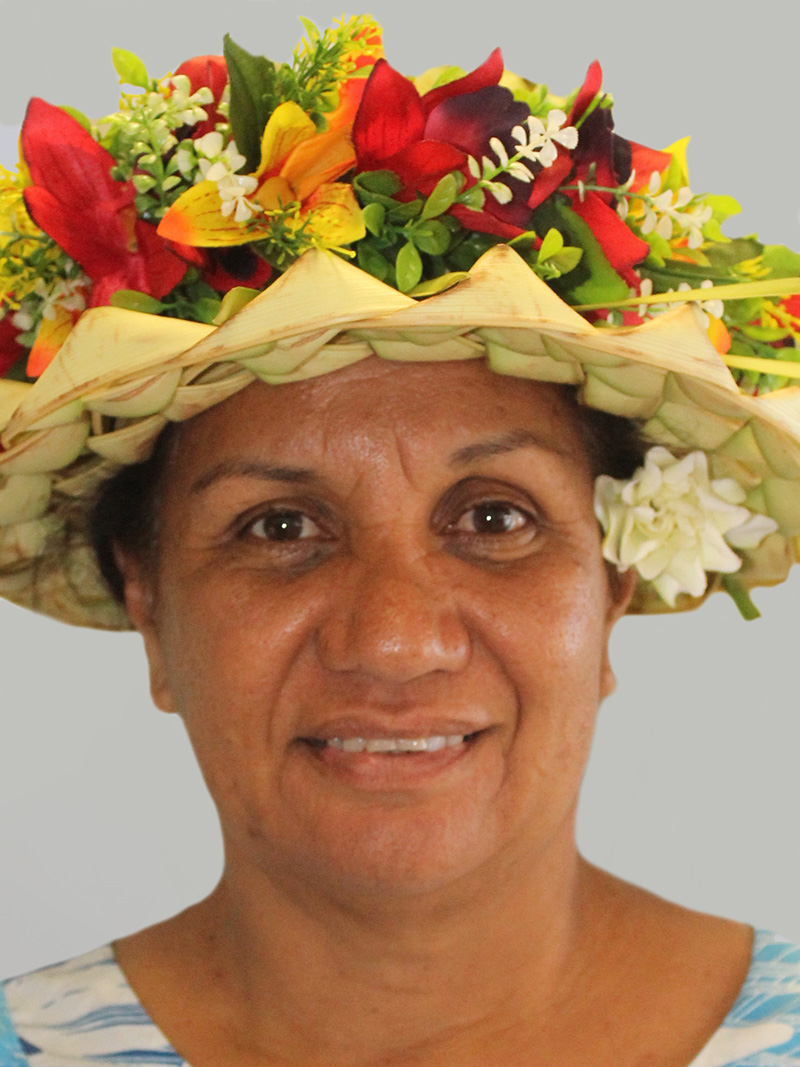
- Selina Napa in 2016

Member of the Cook Islands Parliament for Titikaveka
- In office 21 June 2012 – 1 August 2022
- Preceded by: Robert Wigmore
- Succeeded by: Sonny Williams

Personal details
- Born: 17 October 1964 (age 62)
- Party: Cook Islands Democratic Party

Selina Matenga-Napa MBE (born 17 October 1964) is a Cook Islands politician and former member of the Cook Islands Parliament. She is a member of the Cook Islands Democratic Party. She is the daughter of former MP Dr Teariki Matenga.

== Early life and sporting career ==
Napa was born on Mangaia and educated at Titikaveka School and Tereora College. She has a long involvement in netball, playing at a village level as a child before being part of the Cook Islands national netball team at the 1981 South Pacific Mini Games. She played for the Cook Islands throughout the 1980s and 1990s, including at the 1987 World Netball Tournament, and the 1989 World Games. Eventually she rose to be team captain. She later played for and coached the Titikaveka Pearls, and was part of the selection panel for the Cook Islands women's national cricket team.

== Political career ==
Napa worked for the Business Trade and Investment board, and then as campaign manager for Titikaveka MP Robert Wigmore for four election campaigns. She was later an administrator and spokesperson for the Democratic Party. Following Wigmore's death she was elected to Parliament in the 2012 Titikaveka by-election, which was also contested by her brother. In April 2013 she attended the inaugural Pacific Parliamentary Forum in Wellington, New Zealand.

Napa was re-elected in the 2014 election. In 2015, she was appointed opposition spokesperson for Environment, Telecommunications, Tourism, and Youth and Sport. In 2016, she was part of the Cook Islands' delegation to the second Pacific Parliamentary Forum. She was re-elected again at the 2018 election. In December 2019 she was part of a protest by women MPs to permit the wearing of ei katu (floral crowns) in Parliament. In February 2020 she was appointed Democratic Party spokesperson for Health, Environment, Justice, and the Trade and Investment Board.

She lost her seat in the 2022 Cook Islands general election.

== Honours ==
Napa was awarded an MBE for services to sport, youth and the community in the 2007 New Year Honours.
