= Tepure Tapaitau =

Cook Islands politician

Attorney General
- In office 6 August 1999 – 1 December 1999
- Leader: Joe Williams
- Succeeded by: Norman George

Minister of Police
- In office 6 August 1999 – 1 December 1999
- Prime Minister: Joe Williams
- Succeeded by: Norman George

Minister of Marine Resources
- Prime Minister: Geoffrey Henry
- Succeeded by: Tupou Faireka

Member of the Cook Islands Parliament for Penrhyn
- In office 24 March 1994 – 27 June 2002
- Preceded by: Nihi Vini
- Succeeded by: Wilkie Rasmussen

Personal details
- Died: 14 November 2010
- Party: Cook Islands Party; Democratic Party

Tepure Tapaitau, QPM (died 14 November 2010) was a Cook Islands politician, Cabinet Minister, and Deputy Leader of the Cook Islands Democratic Party and also the first Cook Islander to become the Commissioner of Police.

Tapaitau trained with the FBI in the United States before studying law at the University of Auckland. He served as Police Commissioner before entering politics. He was elected to the Parliament of the Cook Islands at the 1994 election, representing the seat of Penrhyn for the Cook Islands Party. He served as a Minister in the government of Geoffrey Henry, holding the portfolios of marine resources, broadcasting, police and attorney-general. In 1997, he was accused by opposition MP Norman George of misappropriating government materials to build a house in his electorate, but was cleared. He was appointed to the short-lived Cabinet of Joe Williams, but ousted when Terepai Maoate took power. In June 2000 he left the Cook islands party and switched his support to the government. In February 2002 he was appointed to Maoate's Cabinet, but was ousted just days later when the Maoate government lost a confidence motion to Robert Woonton.

In 2002, he was disqualified from Parliament, precipitating a by-election, which he lost. He stood again for the seat as a Democratic Party candidate at the 2004 election, but was unsuccessful. Despite holding the position of deputy leader of the Democratic Party, he did not contest the 2006 election.

In October 2006, he was appointed High Commissioner to New Zealand, a position he held until 2010. In August 2007 he was replaced as Deputy Leader by Wilkie Rasmussen.

Tapaitau was awarded the Queen's Police Medal in the 1989 New Year Honours.

Tapaitau died in Cairns, Australia.
