= John Henry (Cook Islands politician) =

Cook Islands politician (born c.1959)

Member of the Cook Islands Parliament for Avatiu–Ruatonga–Palmerston
- In office 17 November 2010 – 9 July 2014
- Preceded by: Albert (Peto) Nicholas
- Succeeded by: Albert Nicholas

Personal details
- Party: Cook Islands Party

John Mokoenga Tikaka Henry (born c. 1959) is a Cook Islands politician and member of the Cook Islands Parliament. He is a member of the Cook Islands Party.

Henry is a nephew of former Prime Minister of the Cook Islands Sir Geoffrey Henry. He has previously worked as a civil servant in the Ministry of Internal Affairs. He was elected at the 2010 election as MP for Avatiu–Ruatonga–Palmerston.

In February 2011 he was elected as Deputy Speaker of the Cook Islands Parliament. In May 2011 he was made associate minister of finance and internal affairs.

Henry lost his seat at the 2014 election, losing to Albert Nicholas. When Nicholas was forced to resign from Parliament after being expelled from the Democratic Party, Henry contested the 2017 Avatiu–Ruatonga–Palmerston by-election as an independent but was unsuccessful.
