= 2014 Murienua by-election =

Election in the Cook Islands

A by-election was held in the Cook Islands electorate of Murienua on 19 February 2014. The by-election was precipitated by the resignation of the winner of the 2013 Murienua by-election following allegations of election fraud.

Both candidates in the 2013 by-election indicated that they would run again. A "stand-in" candidate for the Cook Islands Party, Tare Mareiti, subsequently withdrew. The election was won by the Democratic Party's James Beer.

Murienua by-election 2014
Party	Candidate	Votes	%	±%
Democratic	James Beer	216	50.9%	
Cook Islands	Kaota Tuariki	208	49.1%	
Turnout		424		

== Aftermath ==
Following the by-election the Cook Islands Party filed an election petition alleging bribery, undue influence, the publication of false allegations to influence the vote, and unqualified voting.
