= Ngereteina Puna =

New Zealand politician

Ngereteina Puna OBE (born 1938) is a former Speaker of the Cook Islands Parliament and Cabinet Minister. He is the older brother of Prime Minister Henry Puna.

== Early life and career ==
Puna grew up on Aitutaki. After graduating from Ardmore Teachers' Training College and the University of Auckland in New Zealand, he worked as a teacher.

== Political career ==
At the 1989 election he was elected as MP for Arutanga-Reureu-Nikaupara. After retiring from politics at the 1999 election he was appointed Speaker of the Cook Islands Parliament, a position he held from 1999 until 2001. He went on to serve as Minister of Education in the Cook Islands Party government of Geoffrey Henry from 2011 to 2012.

== Awards ==
In 1977, Puna was awarded the Queen Elizabeth II Silver Jubilee Medal. In the 1995 New Year Honours, he was appointed an Officer of the Order of the British Empire, for services to the community.

== Personal life ==
Puna is currently based in Auckland, where he works as an advisor to Te Wānanga o Aotearoa.

Puna is a member of the Seventh-day Adventist Church.

Puna's father, Tuakeu Manuela, was a Member of the Legislative Assembly, and his older brother William Estall also served as a Cabinet Minister.
