= Vavoua =

Place in Sassandra-Marahoué, Ivory Coast

- City, sub-prefecture, and commune
- Location in Ivory Coast
- Coordinates: 7°23′N 6°29′W
- Country: Ivory Coast
- District: Sassandra-Marahoué
- Region: Haut-Sassandra
- Department: Vavoua

Area
  - Total: 689 km^{2} (266 sq mi)

Population (2021 census)
  - Total: 132,528
  - Density: 192/km^{2} (498/sq mi)
  - City: 67,096
- (2014 census)
- Time zone: UTC+0 (GMT)

Vavoua is a city in west-central Ivory Coast. It is a sub-prefecture of and the seat of Vavoua Department in Haut-Sassandra Region, Sassandra-Marahoué District. Vavoua is also a commune. In the 2021 census, its population was 132,528.

In October 2018, the city elected Bonaventure Kalou, the former international Ivorian footballer, as its new mayor.

In 2021, the population of the sub-prefecture of Vavoua was 132,528.

== Villages ==
The 14 villages of the sub-prefecture of Vavoua and their population in 2014 are:

1. Akanzakro (1 449)
2. Bouhitafla (1 792)
3. Danzerville (5 183)
4. Dema (6 110)
5. Dyla (1 974)
6. Gatifla (1 466)
7. Gouabafla (4 335)
8. Koudougou Pk 11 (2 810)
9. Koudougou Pk 5 (1 058)
10. Koudougou Pk 8 (2 616)
11. Vavoua (67 096)
12. Baoulifla (13 664)
13. Bonoufla (23 467)
14. Kouetinga (1 631)
