= Robert Wigmore =

Cook Islands politician (1949–2012)

12th Deputy Prime Minister of the Cook Islands
- In office 23 December 2009 – 30 November 2010
- Prime Minister: Jim Marurai
- Preceded by: Terepai Maoate
- Succeeded by: Tom Marsters

Minister of Foreign Affairs
- In office 23 December 2009 – 30 November 2010
- Preceded by: Jim Marurai
- Succeeded by: Tom Marsters

Minister of Agriculture
- In office 31 July 2009 – 30 November 2010
- Preceded by: Ngamau Munokoa
- Succeeded by: Nandi Glassie
- In office 16 November 2002 – 7 September 2004

Minister of Tourism
- In office 31 July 2009 – 30 November 2010
- Preceded by: Wilkie Rasmussen
- Succeeded by: Teina Bishop

Member of the Cook Islands Parliament for Titikaveka
- In office 7 February 2007 – 13 April 2012
- Preceded by: Tekaotiki Matapo
- Succeeded by: Selina Napa
- In office 16 June 1999 – 7 September 2004
- Preceded by: Tekaotiki Matapo
- Succeeded by: Tekaotiki Matapo

Personal details
- Born: 8 September 1949 Rarotonga
- Died: 13 April 2012 (aged 62)
- Party: Cook Islands Democratic Party

Robert George Wigmore (8 September 1949 – 13 April 2012) was the leader of the Cook Islands Democratic Party from 2010 – 2012, and Deputy Prime Minister of the Cook Islands from 2009 to 2010. He served as a Minister in the Cabinets of Robert Woonton and Jim Marurai.

== Early life ==
Wigmore was born in Rarotonga. He was educated in Titikaveka, and worked as a farmer, running Wigmore Farms and the Wigmore Superstore, the largest supplier of fresh fruit and vegetables in the Cook Islands. He served as president of the Cook Islands Chamber of Commerce, and in 1985 he was elected President of the Cook Islands Producers Federation.

== Political career ==
Wigmore was first elected to Parliament as a Democratic Party candidate for the seat of Titikaveka at the 1999 election. He served as an under-secretary to Prime Minister Robert Woonton before being appointed to Cabinet as Minister of Agriculture in November 2002. At the 2004 election he apparently won his seat on the night, but the result was overturned three months later by an electoral petition. In the intervening period there was a leadership dispute within the Democratic party, in which Wigmore remained neutral.

In 2005, in a further ruling on the 2004 electoral petition, the Cook Islands Court of Appeal upheld a High Court finding that Wigmore had bribed piggery owners in his electorate in an effort to gain their vote.

At the 2006 election, Wigmore's election in the seat of Titikaveka was declared invalid by an electoral petition. He was re-elected in a by-election on 7 February 2007.

Wigmore rejoined the Cabinet in July 2009, replacing former Tourism Minister Wilkie Rasmussen who had been sacked for disloyalty. On 23 December 2009, Wigmore was appointed Deputy Prime Minister and Foreign Minister, replacing former Prime Minister and Democratic Party leader Terepai Maoate. He was subsequently expelled from the Democratic party, but a party conference in June 2010 restored his membership and appointed him party leader, with Rasmussen as his deputy. He served as Foreign Minister and Minister of Agriculture until the 2010 election.

Wigmore was re-elected at the 2010 election. In December 2011 he took a leave of absence from Parliament to allow him to be treated for prostate cancer in New Zealand. He died on 13 April 2012.
