= Dania, Ivory Coast =

Dania
- Town and sub-prefecture
- Location in Ivory Coast
- Coordinates: 7°9′N 6°51′W
- Country: Ivory Coast
- District: Sassandra-Marahoué
- Region: Haut-Sassandra
- Department: Vavoua

Population (2014)
  - Total: 77,295
- Time zone: UTC+0 (GMT)

Dania is a town in west-central Ivory Coast. It is a sub-prefecture of Vavoua Department in Haut-Sassandra Region, Sassandra-Marahoué District.

Dania was a commune until March 2012, when it became one of 1,126 communes nationwide that were abolished.

In 2014, the population of the sub-prefecture of Dania was 77,295.

== Villages ==
The 10 villages of the sub-prefecture of Dania and their population in 2014 are:

1. Bagouri (6,062)
2. Bohinou (6,124)
3. Dania (6,101)
4. Fionkon (4,163)
5. Gbabo (8,051)
6. Gbehigbly (5,620)
7. Monoko-Zohi (10,115)
8. Pélézi (14,100)
9. Vaou (9,513)
10. Zoukouboué (7,446)
