= Penrhyn (electorate) =

Electoral division in the Cook Islands

- Constituency for the Parliament of the Cook Islands
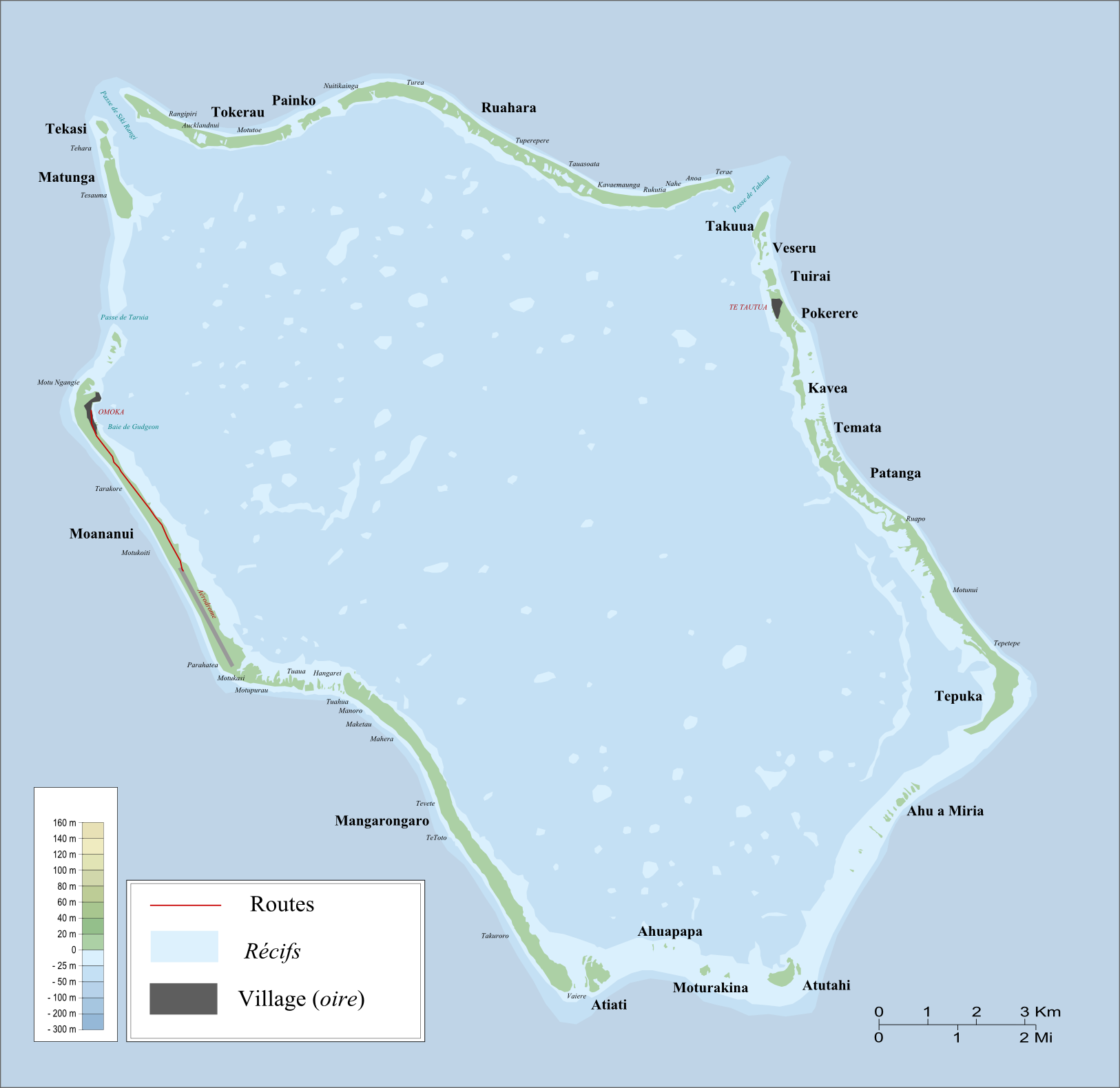
- Region: Outer Islands

Current constituency
- Number of members: 1
- Member: Vaine Wichman

Penrhyn is a Cook Islands electoral division returning one member to the Cook Islands Parliament. Its current representative is Vaine Wichman, who has held the seat since 2026.

The electorate consists of the atoll of Penrhyn.

== Members of Parliament for Penrhyn ==
Unless otherwise stated, all MPs terms began and ended at general elections.

Name	Party	Elected	Left Office	Reason
Tangaroa Tangaroa	Independent	1965, 1968	1983	Joined new party
Tangaroa Tangaroa	Democratic Party	1972, 1974, 1978	1983	Unknown
Nihi Vini	Democratic Party	1989	1994	Changed parties
Nihi Vini	Cook Islands Party	-	1994	Defeated
Tepure Tapaitau	Cook Islands Party	1994, 1999	2002 by-election	Changed parties
Tepure Tapaitau	Independent	-	2002 by-election	Defeated in by-election
Wilkie Rasmussen	Cook Islands Party	2002 by-election, 2004	2014	Changed parties
Wilkie Rasmussen	Democratic Party	2004, 2006, 2010	2014	Defeated
Willie John	Cook Islands Party	2014	2018	Defeated
Robert Tapaitau	Independent	2018	2024	Changed party
Robert Tapaitau	Cook Islands Party	2022	2024	Lost his seat due to criminal conviction
Sarakura Tapaitau	Independent	2024 by-election	2026	Defeated
Vaine Wichman	Cook Islands Party	2026	incumbent	

== Election results ==
=== 2026 election ===
2026 Cook Islands general election: Penrhyn
Party	Candidate	Votes	%	±%
Cook Islands	Vaine Wichman	71	58.7	
Independent	Sarakura Tapaitau^{†}	50	41.3	
Turnout		121		
Cook Islands gain from Independent		Swing		
^{†} incumbent

=== 2006 election ===
2006 Cook Islands general election: Penrhyn
Party	Candidate	Votes	%	±%
Democratic	Wilkie Rasmussen	Unopposed		

=== 2004 election ===
2004 Cook Islands general election: Penrhyn
Party	Candidate	Votes	%	±%
Cook Islands	Wilkie Rasmussen	103	52.3	
Democratic	Tepure Tapaitau	94	47.7	
Turnout		197	102.1	

=== 2002 byelection ===
2002 Penrhyn by-election
Party	Candidate	Votes	%	±%
Cook Islands	Wilkie Rasmussen	104	51.0	
Independent	Tepure Tapaitau	100	49.0	
Turnout		204		
