= Avatiu–Ruatonga–Palmerston =

Electoral division in the Cook Islands

- Constituency for the Parliament of the Cook Islands
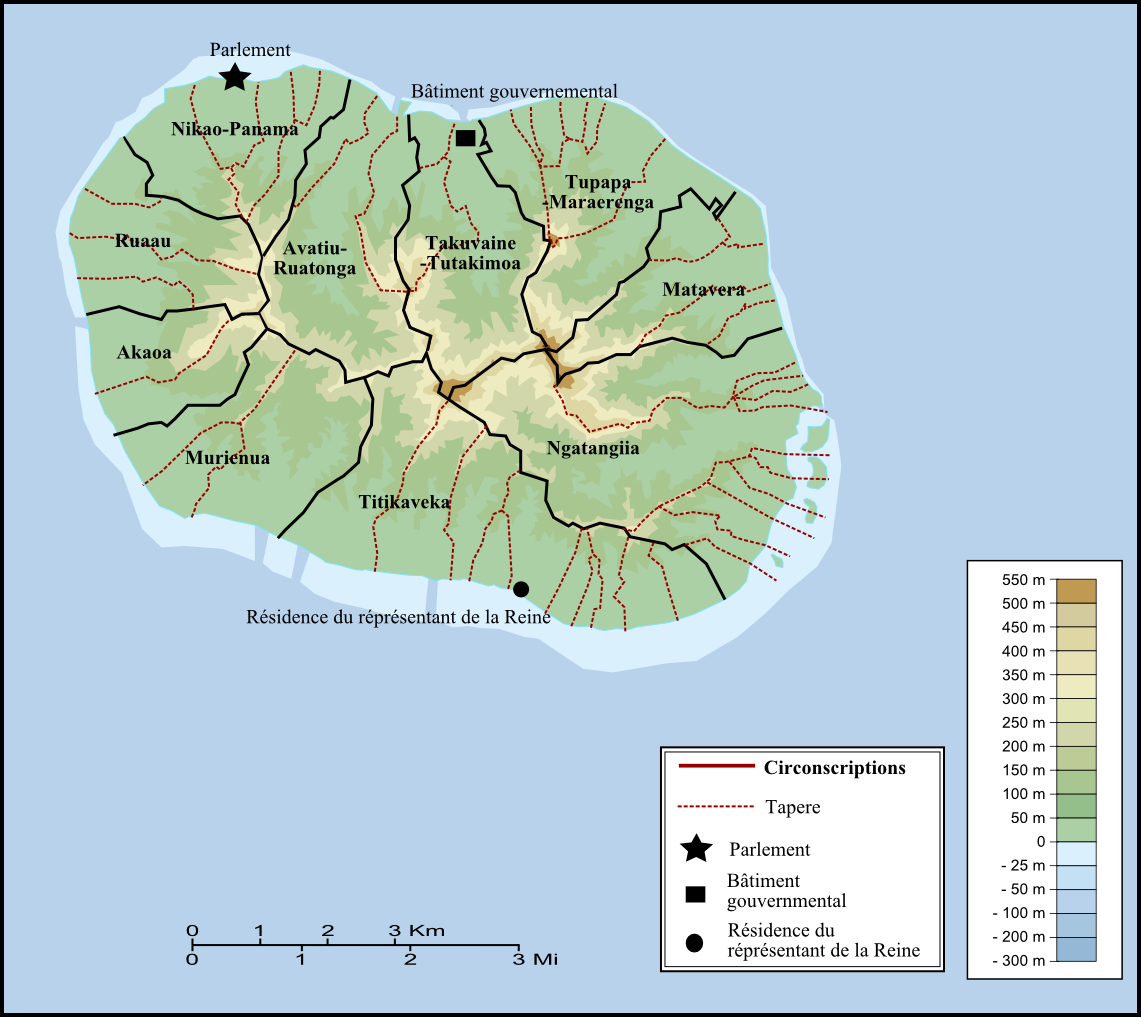
- Region: Rarotonga

Current constituency
- Created: 1981
- Number of members: 1
- Member: Albert Nicholas
- Created from: Te-au-o-tonga

Avatiu–Ruatonga–Palmerston or RAPPA is a Cook Islands electoral division returning one member to the Cook Islands Parliament.

The electorate was created in 1981, when the Constitution Amendment (No. 9) Act 1980–1981 adjusted electorate boundaries and split the electorate of Te-au-o-tonga into four. It was further expanded in 1986 by the Constitution Amendment (No. 12) Act 1986. It consists of the tapere of Atupa, Avatiu and Ruatonga on the island of Rarotonga, as well as Palmerston Island.

== Members of Parliament ==
Member	Party	Election
Albert (Peto) Nicholas	Alliance Party	1994
Albert (Peto) Nicholas	New Alliance Party	1999
Albert (Peto) Nicholas	Cook Islands Party	2004, 2006
John Henry	Cook Islands Party	2010
Albert Nicholas	Democratic Party	2014
Albert Nicholas	Cook Islands Party	2017 by-election, 2018, 2022, 2026

== Election results ==
2026 Cook Islands general election: Avatiu–Ruatonga–Palmerston
Party	Candidate	Votes	%	±%
Cook Islands	Albert Nicholas^{†}	376	62.5	
Cook Islands United	Teina Rongo	226	37.5	
Turnout		602		
Cook Islands hold		Swing		
^{†} incumbent

2022 Cook Islands general election: Avatiu-Ruatonga-Palmerston
Party	Candidate	Votes	%	±%
Cook Islands	Albert Nicholas	358	60.7	+7.8
Democratic	Teina Rongo	195	33.1	−14.0
Cook Islands United	Makiroa Mitchell	37	6.3	+6.3
Turnout		590		
Cook Islands hold		Swing	+10.9	
