= Kura Strickland =

Cook Islands politician (1929–2014)

- Born: December , 1929; Aitutaki
- Died: 31 January 2014 (aged 84)
- Occupations: Politician, Cabinet Minister
- Awards: Officer of the Order of the British Empire (OBE)

Kura Strickland OBE (December 1929 – 31 January 2014) was a Cook Islands politician and Cabinet Minister.

Strickland was born on Aitutaki and worked for the Cook Islands Trading Company and as a public servant before being elected to Parliament as one of the members for the multi-member seat of Aitutaki. He subsequently represented the seat of Amuri–Ureia. He was later elevated to Cabinet.

He was promoted to an Officer of the Order of the British Empire in the 1994 New Year Honours. He died in January 2014 of prostate cancer.
