= Murienua (electorate) =

Electoral division of the Cook Islands

- Constituency for the Parliament of the Cook Islands
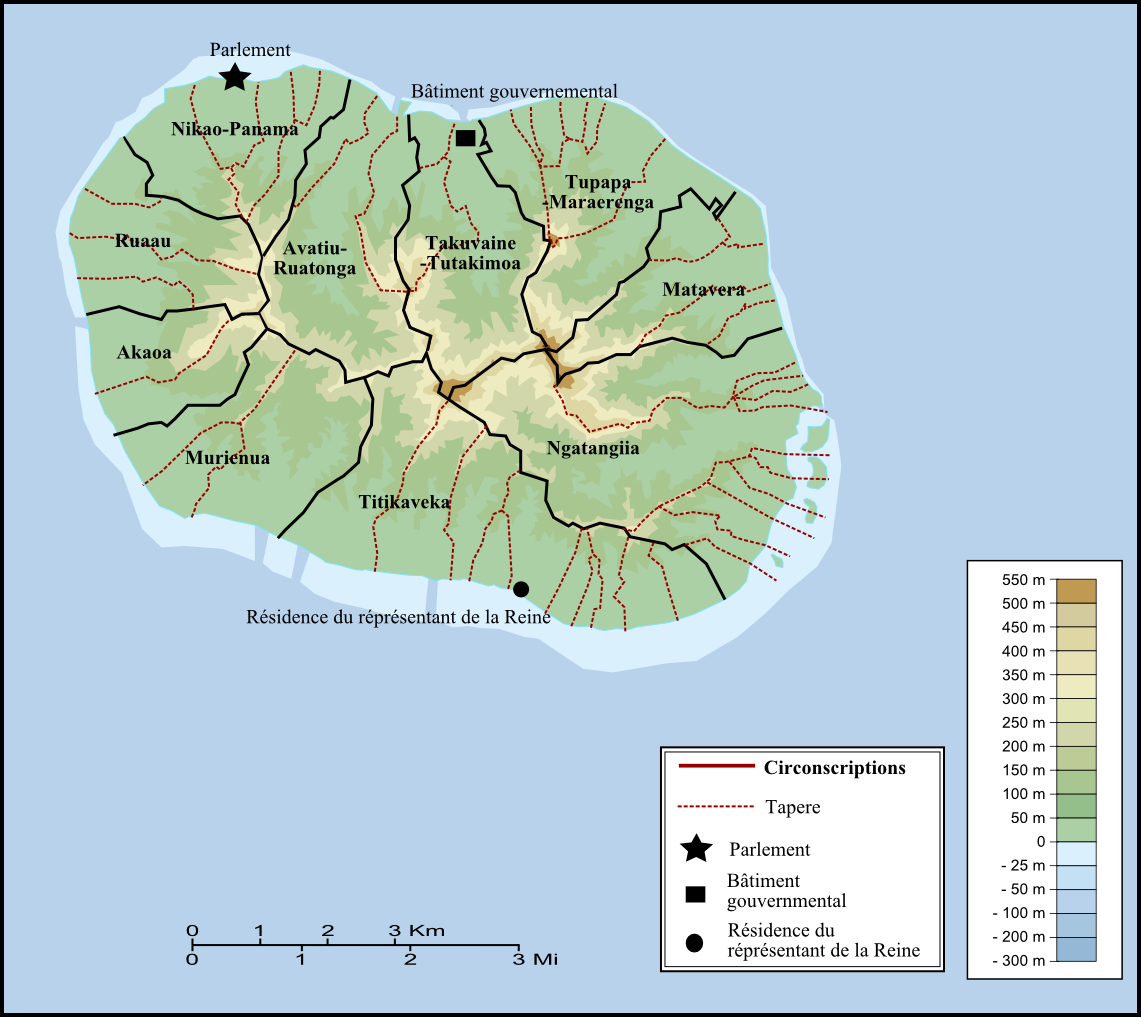
- Region: Rarotonga

Current constituency
- Created: 1981
- Number of members: 1
- Member: Teariki Heather
- Created from: Puaikura

Murienua is a Cook Islands electoral division returning one member to the Cook Islands Parliament.

The electorate was created in 1981, when the Constitution Amendment (No. 9) Act 1980–1981 adjusted electorate boundaries and split the electorate of Puaikura into two. In 1991 the electorate was split in half by the Constitution Amendment (No. 14) Act 1991 to form the electorate of Akaoa. It currently consists of the tapere of Kavera, Aroa, and Rutaki on the island of Rarotonga.

== Members of Parliament ==
Election	Member	Party
1991 by-election, 1994, 1999, 2004, 2006, 2010	Tom Marsters	Cook Islands Party
2013 by-election	Kaota Tuariki	Cook Islands Party
2014 by-election, 2014	James Beer	Democratic Party
2018	Patrick Arioka	Cook Islands Party
2022, 2026	Teariki Heather	Cook Islands United Party

== Election results ==
2026 Cook Islands general election: Murienua
Party	Candidate	Votes	%	±%
Cook Islands United	Teariki Heather^{†}	344	64.9	
Cook Islands	Nooroa Baker	169	31.9	
Democratic	Samuel Mataroa	17	3.2	
Turnout		530		
Cook Islands United hold		Swing		
^{†} incumbent
