= Vincent Ingram =

Cook Islands politician

Vincent Alfred Kura Teratu Ingram (10 July 1946 – 6 June 2010) was a Cook Islands politician and Cabinet Minister.

Ingram was born in Auckland, New Zealand, and initially raised in Samoa and then Rarotonga. He was educated at Avarua Side School, and then Mt Albert Grammar School in Auckland for his secondary education. He studied law, and was accepted to the bar in New Zealand in 1974, and the Cook Islands in 1975.

Ingram joined the Cook Islands Democratic Party in the 1970s, and along with Norman George was active in fundraising for the party in New Zealand. He was elected to the Cook Islands Parliament in the 1978 election, and served in the administration of Tom Davis as Minister of Economic Development, Minister of Police and the Minister of Justice. After falling out with Davis in 1983, he crossed the floor, and served as Leader of the Opposition between 1984 and 1986. He was subsequently leader of the breakaway Democratic Tumu Party, which supported the Cook Islands Party administration of Geoffrey Henry. He was Deputy Speaker of the House from 1989 to 1993.

In 1993, Ingram became the Cook Islands' first High Commissioner to Australia. He retired to Auckland in 1996.
