= 1989 Cook Islands general election =

- 19 January 1989
- 24 seats in the Parliament; 13 seats needed for a majority
Party	Leader	Seats	+/–
Cook Islands	Geoffrey Henry	12	+1
Democratic	Pupuke Robati	9	−4
Democratic Tumu	Vincent Ingram	2	New
Independents	–	1	+1
This lists parties that won seats. See the complete results below.
Prime Minister before	Prime Minister after
Pupuke Robati; DP	Geoffrey Henry; CIP

General elections were held in the Cook Islands on 19 January 1989 to elect 24 MPs to the Parliament. The elections saw the Cook Islands Party win 12 seats, the Democratic Tumu Party win 2 seats, and the Democratic Party-led opposition coalition win 9 seats. One seat was won by an independent. Following the elections, the Democratic Tumu Party supported the CIP, and Geoffrey Henry became Prime Minister for the second time.

== Background ==
In the November 1983 elections the Democratic Party had won a 13–11 majority in parliament, resulting in Tom Davis becoming prime minister. In the leadup to the elections there had been tension within the Democratic Party between Davis, its leader, and former cabinet minister Vincent Ingram, who had served as leader of the opposition after Davis lost his seat in the March 1983 elections. When Ingram was not given a position in Davis' new cabinet, he implied publicly that he would refuse to support the budget. Faced with the loss of his majority, Davis formed a coalition government with oppsition leader Geoffrey Henry in August 1984. The coalition collapsed in July 1985 after Davis sacked Henry from the deputy premiership, but four Cook Islands Party MPs, led by Terepai Maoate, continued to support the government.

In July 1987 Davis failed three times to pass a budget, and was ousted in a unanimous vote of no confidence. His replacement, Pupuke Robati, was elected with the support of the former coalition. By the time of the 1989 elections, further realignments had resulted in six CIP MPs supporting the government and six supporting the opposition under Geoffrey Henry.

== Campaign ==
During the campaign, the Cook Islands Party secured an injunction forbidding those members supporting the government from campaigning under the party name. The government barred the state-owned newspaper and radio station from providing political coverage for two months before the election. Despite this, news was broken in opposition pamphlets of systematic abuse of travel expenses by ministers.

== Results ==
Party	Seats	+/–
Cook Islands Party	12	+1
Democratic Party	9	–4
Democratic Tumu Party	2	New
Independents	1	New
Total	24	0
Source: World Factbook

== Aftermath ==
Following the poll the Democratic Tumu leader Vincent Ingram agreed to informally support the Cook Islands Party government and abstain on legislation rather than oppose it.
