= Ivirua (electorate) =

Electoral constituency of the Cook Islands

- Constituency for the Parliament of the Cook Islands
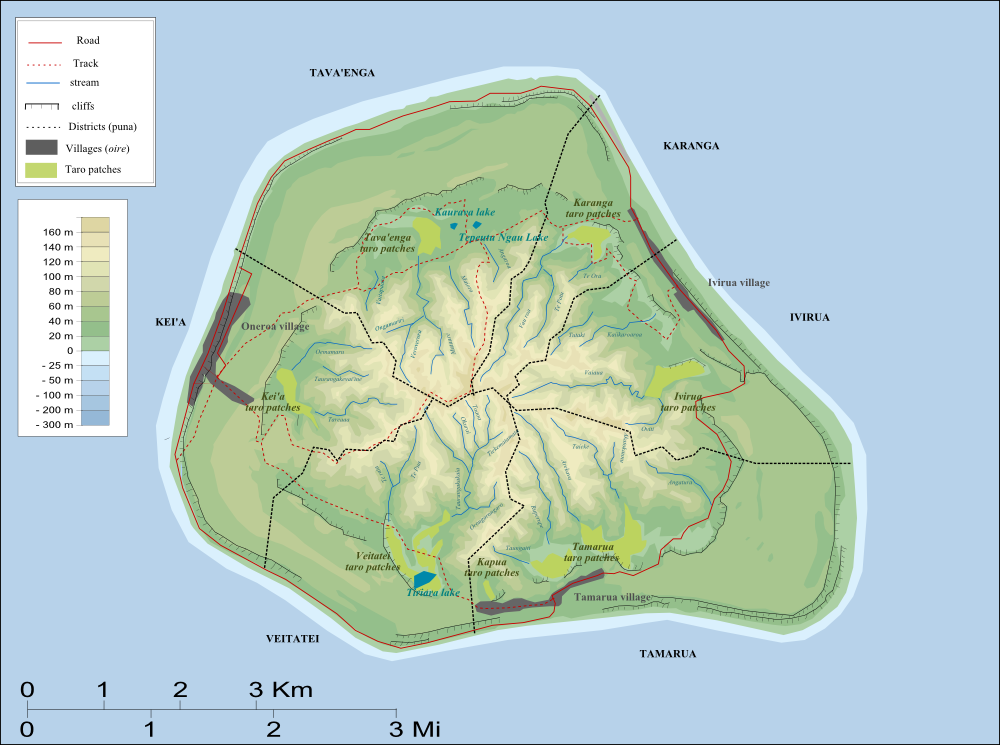
- Region: Mangaia

Current constituency
- Created: 1981
- Number of members: 1
- Member: Agnes Armstrong
- Created from: Mangaia

Ivirua is a Cook Islands electoral division returning one member to the Cook Islands Parliament. Its current representative is Agnes Armstrong, who has held the seat since she won it in a by-election in 2019.

The electorate consists of the districts of Ivirua and Karanga on the island of Mangaia. It was created in 1981, when the Constitution Amendment (No. 9) Act 1980–1981 adjusted electorate boundaries and split the electorate of Mangaia into three.

== Members ==
Member	Party	Term
Jim Marurai	NAP	16 June 1999 – 7 September 2004
Jim Marurai	Democratic	7 September 2004 – 14 June 2018
Anthony Toruariki Armstrong	Democratic	14 June 2018 – 1 August 2022
Agnes Armstrong	Democratic	1 August 2022 – present
Agnes Armstrong	Independent	1 August 2022 – present

== Electoral results ==
2026 Cook Islands general election: Ivirua
Party	Candidate	Votes	%	±%
Independent	Agnes Armstrong^{†}	Unopposed		
Independent gain from Democratic				
^{†} incumbent

2022 Cook Islands general election
Party	Candidate	Votes	%	±%
Democratic	Agnes Armstrong	57	72.15	▲10.95
Cook Islands	Marouna Pakuru	12	15.19	▼23.61
Cook Islands United	Ngametua Angai Peraua	10	12.66	
Democratic hold				

2018 Cook Islands general election
Party	Candidate	Votes	%	±%
Democratic	Anthony Toruariki Armstrong	52	61.2	
Cook Islands	Marion Harry	33	38.8	
Democratic hold				

2014 Cook Islands general election (uncontested)
Party	Candidate	Votes	%	±%
Democratic	Jim Marurai			
Democratic hold				

2010 Cook Islands general election
Party	Candidate	Votes	%	±%
Democratic	Jim Marurai	60	92.3	+8.6
Cook Islands	Moe Lucre	5	7.7	
Democratic hold		Swing	+8.6	

2006 Cook Islands general election
Party	Candidate	Votes	%	±%
Democratic	Jim Marurai	82	83.7	
Cook Islands	Maara Peraua	16	16.3	
Democratic hold				

2004 Cook Islands general election (uncontested)
Party	Candidate	Votes	%	±%
Democratic	Jim Marurai			
Democratic hold				
