= Séitifla =

- Town and sub-prefecture
- Location in Ivory Coast
- Coordinates: 7°26′25.4″N 6°43′05.4″W
- Country: Ivory Coast
- District: Sassandra-Marahoué
- Region: Haut-Sassandra
- Department: Vavoua

Population (2014)
  - Total: 93,430
- Time zone: UTC+0 (GMT)

Séitifla is a town in west-central Ivory Coast. It is a sub-prefecture of Vavoua Department in Haut-Sassandra Region, Sassandra-Marahoué District.

Séitifla was a commune until March 2012, when it became one of 1,126 communes nationwide that were abolished.

In 2014, the population of the sub-prefecture of Séitifla was 93,430.

== Villages ==
The 18 villages of the sub-prefecture of Séitifla and their population in 2014 are:

1. Ancien - Prozi (24,103)
2. Bahiry (2,889)
3. Biénoufla (2,431)
4. Bohifla (1,679)
5. Daouo (4,083)
6. Diafla (7,663)
7. Doufla (3,282)
8. Goïzra (788)
9. Kouénoufla-Don (4,022)
10. Mignoré (14,025)
11. Néouléfla (2,460)
12. Prozi 1 (410)
13. Séitifla (8,040)
14. Vaafla (6,694)
15. Yala (4,870)
16. Yoourédoula (3,426)
17. Zala (1,707)
18. Zroninfla (858)
