= Vavoua Department =

Coordinates: 7°23′N 6°29′W

Vavoua Department Département de Vavoua
- Department
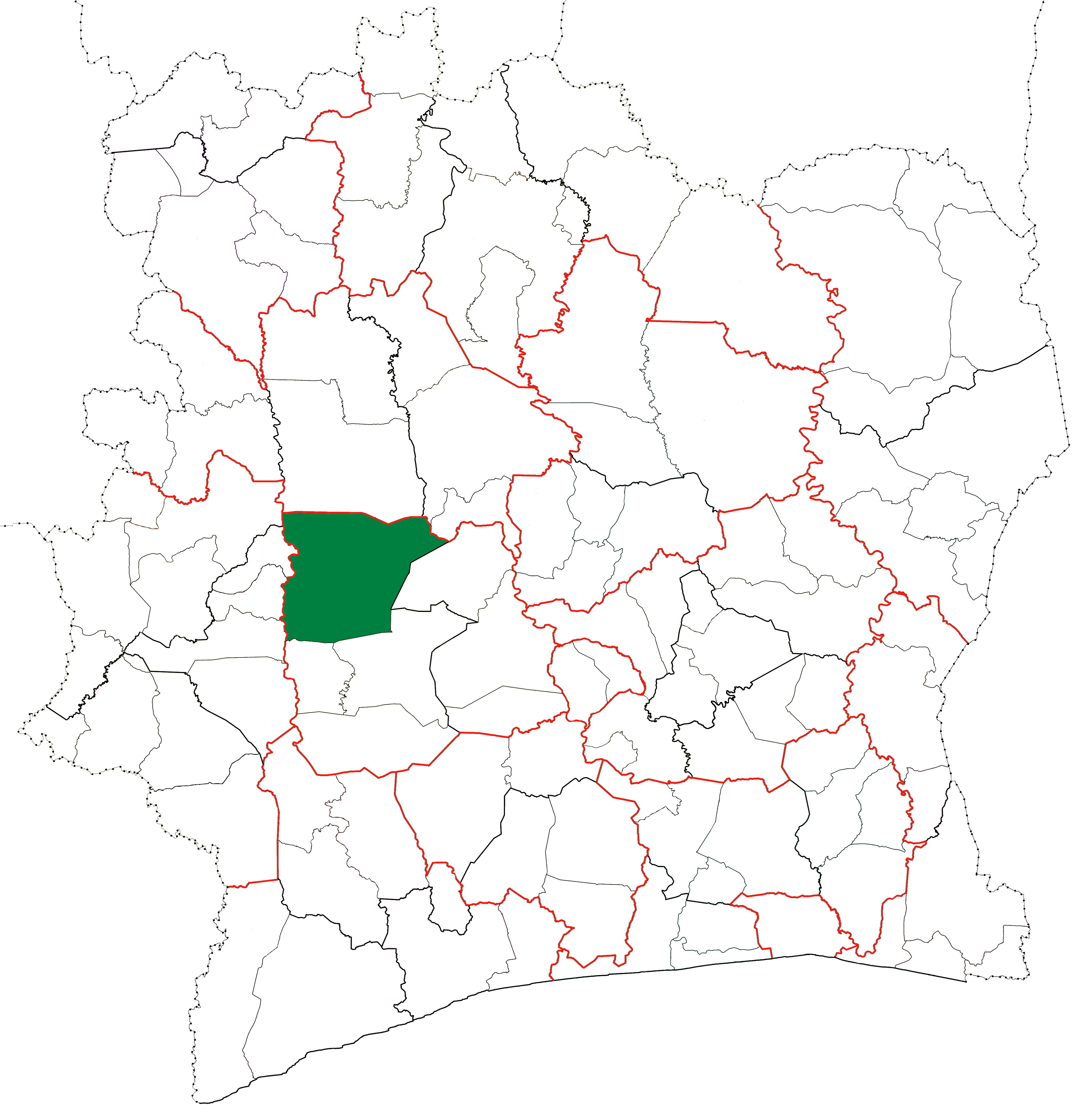
- Location in Ivory Coast. Vavoua Department has retained the same boundaries since its creation in 1988.
- Country: Ivory Coast
- District: Sassandra-Marahoué
- Region: Haut-Sassandra
- 1988: Established as a first-level subdivision via a division of Daloa Dept
- 1997: Converted to a second-level subdivision
- 2011: Converted to a third-level subdivision
- Departmental seat: Vavoua

Government
  - Prefect: N'Cho Pierre Nzaire M'Bassidjé

Area
  - Total: 6,320 km^{2} (2,440 sq mi)

Population (2021 census)
  - Total: 477,154
  - Density: 75.5/km^{2} (196/sq mi)
- Time zone: UTC+0 (GMT)

Vavoua Department is a department of Haut-Sassandra Region in Sassandra-Marahoué District, Ivory Coast. In 2021, its population was 477,154 and its seat is the settlement of Vavoua. The sub-prefectures of the department are Bazra-Nattis, Dananon, Dania, Kétro-Bassam, Séitifla, and Vavoua.

== Economy ==
Local industries include cocoa, cotton growing, and logging.

== History ==
Vavoua Department was created in 1988 as a first-level subdivision via a split-off from Daloa Department.

In 1997, regions were introduced as new first-level subdivisions of Ivory Coast; as a result, all departments were converted into second-level subdivisions. Vavoua Department was included in Haut-Sassandra Region.

In 2011, districts were introduced as new first-level subdivisions of Ivory Coast. At the same time, regions were reorganised and became second-level subdivisions and all departments were converted into third-level subdivisions. At this time, Vavoua Department remained part of the retained Haut-Sassandra Region in the new Sassandra-Marahoué District.

Vavoua International School, a Christian missionary boarding school run by WEC International, was situated in the department, adjacent to the small village of Bouitafla, until the Second Ivorian Civil War forced its closing.
