= Outline of the Cook Islands =

Overview of and topical guide to the Cook Islands

The Flag of the Cook Islands

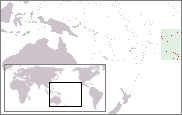
The location of the Cook Islands

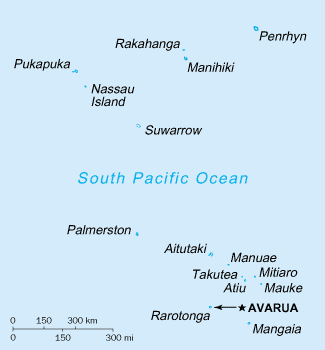
An enlargeable map of the Cook Islands

The following outline is provided as an overview of and topical guide to the Cook Islands:

Cook Islands – self-governing parliamentary democracy in free association with New Zealand. The fifteen small islands in this South Pacific Ocean country have a total land area of 240 square kilometres (92.7 sq mi), but the Cook Islands Exclusive Economic Zone (EEZ) covers 1.8 million square kilometres (0.7 million sq mi) of ocean. The main population centres are on the island of Rarotonga (c.10,000), where there is an international airport. Defence is the responsibility of New Zealand, in consultation with the Cook Islands and at its request. In recent times, the Cook Islands have adopted an increasingly independent foreign policy.

== General reference ==
- Pronunciation:
- Common English country name: The Cook Islands
- Official English country name: The Cook Islands
- Common endonym(s): Kūki 'Āirani
- Official endonym(s): Kūki 'Āirani
- Adjectival(s): Cook Island
- Demonym(s): Cook Islander
- Etymology: Name of the Cook Islands
- ISO country codes: CK, COK, 184
- ISO region codes: See ISO 3166-2:CK
- Internet country code top-level domain: .ck

== Geography of the Cook Islands ==
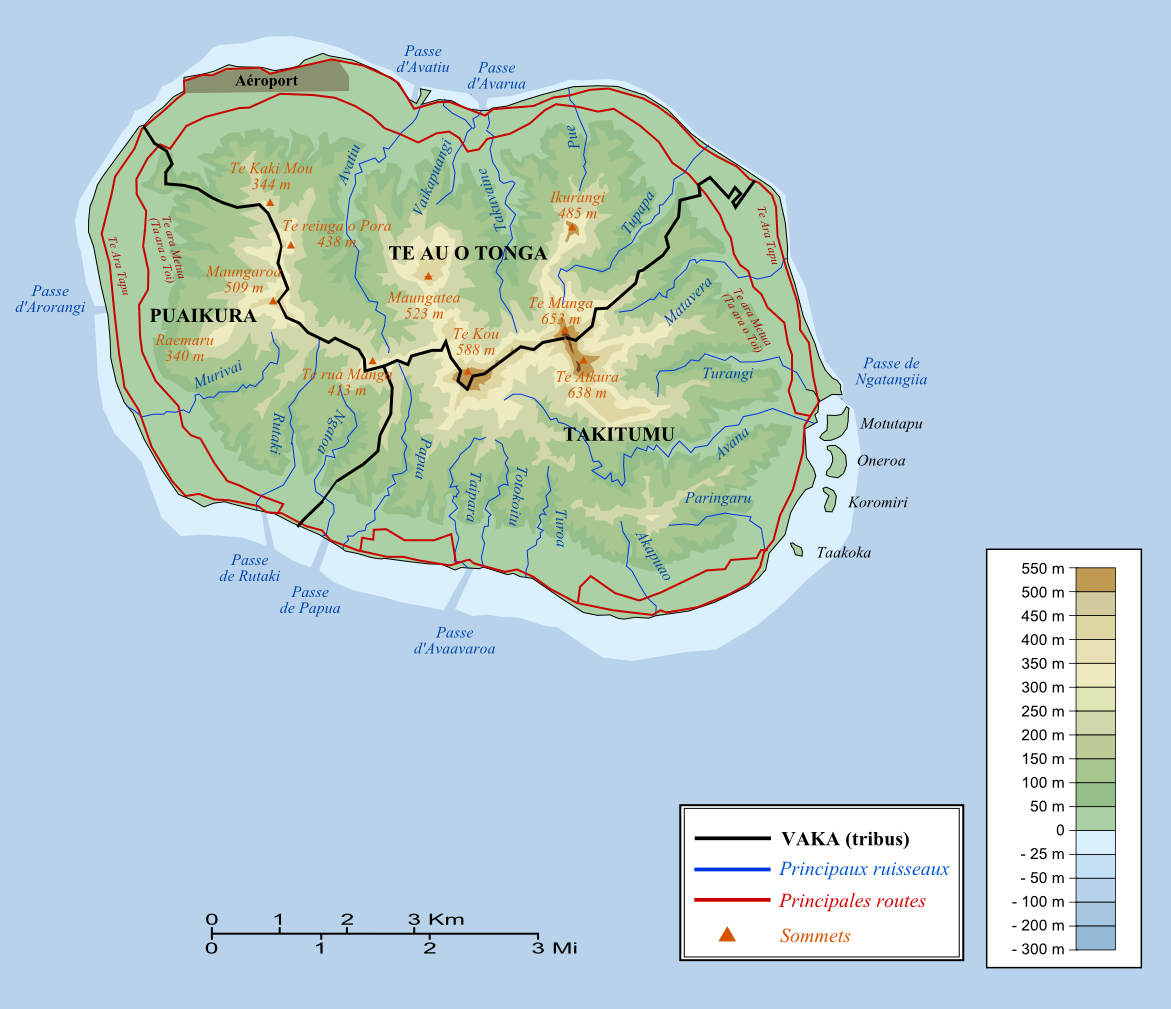
An enlargeable topographic map of Rarotonga

Geography of the Cook Islands

- The Cook Islands are: a territory of New Zealand
- Location:
  - Southern Hemisphere and Eastern Hemisphere
  - Pacific Ocean
    - South Pacific Ocean
      - Oceania
        - Polynesia
  - Time zone: UTC-10
  - Extreme points of the Cook Islands
    - High: Te Manga 652 m (2,139 ft)
    - Low: South Pacific Ocean 0 m
  - Land boundaries: none
  - Coastline: 120 km
- Population of the Cook Islands: 17,459 – 223rd most populous country
- Area of the Cook Islands: 236.7 km^{2} (91.4 sq mi)
- Atlas of the Cook Islands

=== Environment of the Cook Islands ===
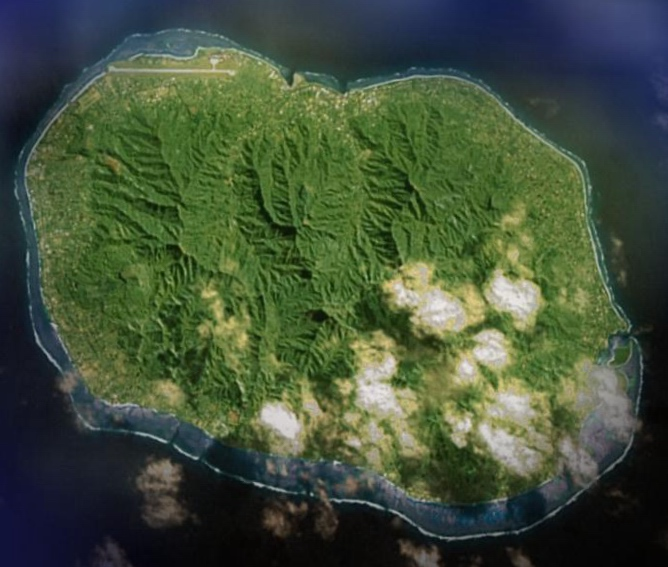
An enlargeable satellite image of Rarotonga

- Climate of the Cook Islands
- Renewable energy in the Cook Islands
- Geology of the Cook Islands
- Protected areas of the Cook Islands
  - Biosphere reserves in the Cook Islands
  - National parks of the Cook Islands
- Wildlife of the Cook Islands
  - Fauna of the Cook Islands
    - Birds of the Cook Islands
    - Mammals of the Cook Islands

==== Natural geographic features of the Cook Islands ====
- Islands of the Cook Islands
  - Northern chain
  - Southern chain
- Lakes of the Cook Islands
- Mountains of the Cook Islands
  - Volcanoes in the Cook Islands
- Rivers of the Cook Islands
  - Waterfalls of the Cook Islands
- Valleys of the Cook Islands
- World Heritage Sites in the Cook Islands: None

=== Regions of the Cook Islands ===
Regions of the Cook Islands

==== Ecoregions of the Cook Islands ====
List of ecoregions in the Cook Islands

==== Administrative divisions of the Cook Islands ====
None

===== Municipalities of the Cook Islands =====
- Capital of the Cook Islands: Avarua
- Cities of the Cook Islands

=== Demography of the Cook Islands ===
Demographics of the Cook Islands

== Government and politics of the Cook Islands ==
Politics of the Cook Islands

- Form of government: parliamentary representative democracy within a constitutional monarchy
- Capital of the Cook Islands: Avarua
- Elections in the Cook Islands
- Political parties in the Cook Islands

=== Branches of the government of the Cook Islands ===
Government of the Cook Islands

==== Executive branch of the government of the Cook Islands ====
- Head of state: Charles III
- Head of government: Prime Minister of the Cook Islands
- Cabinet of the Cook Islands

==== Legislative branch of the government of the Cook Islands ====
- Parliament of the Cook Islands
- House of Ariki (Advisory Body)

==== Judicial branch of the government of the Cook Islands ====
Judiciary of the Cook Islands

- Cook Islands Court of Appeal
- High Court of the Cook Islands
- Chief Justice of the Cook Islands

=== Foreign relations of the Cook Islands ===
Foreign relations of the Cook Islands

- Diplomatic missions in the Cook Islands
- Diplomatic missions of the Cook Islands

==== International organization membership ====
The government of the Cook Islands is a member of:

- African, Caribbean, and Pacific Group of States (ACP)
- Asian Development Bank (ADB)
- Food and Agriculture Organization (FAO)
- International Civil Aviation Organization (ICAO)
- International Criminal Court (ICCt)
- International Federation of Red Cross and Red Crescent Societies (IFRCS)
- International Fund for Agricultural Development (IFAD)
- International Mobile Satellite Organization (IMSO)
- International Olympic Committee (IOC)
- International Red Cross and Red Crescent Movement (ICRM)
- International Trade Union Confederation (ITUC)
- Organisation for the Prohibition of Chemical Weapons (OPCW)
- Pacific Islands Forum (PIF)
- Secretariat of the Pacific Community (SPC)
- South Pacific Regional Trade and Economic Cooperation Agreement (Sparteca)
- United Nations Educational, Scientific, and Cultural Organization (UNESCO)
- Universal Postal Union (UPU)
- World Health Organization (WHO)
- World Meteorological Organization (WMO)

=== Law and order in the Cook Islands ===
Law of the Cook Islands

- Capital punishment in the Cook Islands
- Constitution of the Cook Islands
- Crime in the Cook Islands
- Human rights in the Cook Islands
  - LGBT rights in the Cook Islands
  - Freedom of religion in the Cook Islands
- Law enforcement in the Cook Islands

=== Military of the Cook Islands ===
Military of the Cook Islands

=== Local government in the Cook Islands ===
Local government in the Cook Islands

== History of the Cook Islands ==
History of the Cook Islands

- Timeline of the history of the Cook Islands
- Current events of the Cook Islands
- Military history of the Cook Islands

== Culture of the Cook Islands ==
Culture of the Cook Islands

- Architecture of the Cook Islands
- Cuisine of the Cook Islands
- Festivals in the Cook Islands
- Languages of the Cook Islands
- Media in the Cook Islands
- National symbols of the Cook Islands
  - Coat of arms of the Cook Islands
  - Flag of the Cook Islands
  - National anthem of the Cook Islands
- People of the Cook Islands
- Public holidays in the Cook Islands
- Records of the Cook Islands
- Religion in the Cook Islands
  - Christianity in the Cook Islands
  - Hinduism in the Cook Islands
  - Islam in the Cook Islands
  - Judaism in the Cook Islands
  - Sikhism in the Cook Islands
- World Heritage Sites in the Cook Islands: None

=== Art in the Cook Islands ===
- Art in the Cook Islands
- Cinema of the Cook Islands
- Literature of the Cook Islands
- Music of the Cook Islands
- Television in the Cook Islands
- Theatre in the Cook Islands

=== Sports in the Cook Islands ===
Sports in the Cook Islands

- Rugby league in the Cook Islands
- Rugby union in the Cook Islands
- Football in the Cook Islands
- Cook Islands at the Olympics

== Economy and infrastructure of the Cook Islands ==
Economy of the Cook Islands

- Economic rank, by nominal GDP (2007): 185th (one hundred and eighty fifth)
- Agriculture in the Cook Islands
- Banking in the Cook Islands
  - National Bank of the Cook Islands
- Telecommunications in the Cook Islands
- Companies of the Cook Islands
- Currency of the Cook Islands: Cook Islands dollar/New Zealand dollar
  - ISO 4217: NZD
- Energy in the Cook Islands
  - Renewable energy in the Cook Islands
  - Energy policy of the Cook Islands
  - Oil industry in the Cook Islands
- Mining in the Cook Islands
- Tourism in the Cook Islands
- Transport in the Cook Islands
- the Cook Islands Stock Exchange

== Education in the Cook Islands ==
Education in the Cook Islands

- Nukutere College

== Infrastructure of the Cook Islands ==
- Health care in the Cook Islands
- Transportation in the Cook Islands
  - Airports in the Cook Islands
  - Rail transport in the Cook Islands
  - Roads in the Cook Islands
- Water supply and sanitation in the Cook Islands

== See also ==
Cook Islands

- Cook Islands Maori language
- Index of Cook Islands–related articles
- List of Cook Islands-related topics
- List of international rankings
- Outline of geography
- Outline of New Zealand
- Outline of Oceania
