= Index of Cook Islands–related articles =

This article contains a list topics related to the Cook Islands:

== A ==
- Avarua

== C ==
- Catholic Church in Rarotonga
- Cook, Captain James
- Cook Islands Maori
- Cook Islands Party

== D ==
- Democratic Party
- Demographics of the Cook Islands

== E ==
- Economy of the Cook Islands
- Elections in the Cook Islands

== F ==
- Flag of the Cook Islands

== G ==
- Geography of the Cook Islands

== H ==
- History of the Cook Islands

== I ==
- Invasive species in the Cook Islands

== J ==
- Judiciary of the Cook Islands

== K ==
- Kaoa

== L ==
- LGBT rights in the Cook Islands

== M ==
- Marae Moana
- Music of the Cook Islands

== N ==
- New Zealand
- Nukutere College

== P ==
- Pepe and the Rarotongans
- Politics of the Cook Islands
- Postage stamps and postal history of the Cook Islands

== R ==
- Roman Catholic Diocese of Rarotonga
- Rugby union in the Cook Islands

== S ==
- Sheraton Resort Rarotonga
- Sport in the Cook Islands
- Survivor: Cook Islands

== T ==
- Telecommunications in the Cook Islands
- Transport in the Cook Islands

== U ==
- Ura (dance)

== V ==
- Vaitakere

== See also ==
- Lists of country-related topics - similar lists for other countries
