= Religion in the Cook Islands =

Religion in the Cook Islands (2021 census)
1. Reformed Church (Cook Islands Christian Church) (43.1%)
2. Adventism (Seventh-day Adventist Church) (8.30%)
3. Pentecostalism (Assemblies of God, Apostolic Church) (5.70%)
4. Catholicism (16.7%)
5. Mormonism (3.90%)
6. Other (6.70%)
7. No religion (13.6%)
8. No response (2.00%)

In antiquity, Cook Islanders practiced Cook Islands mythology, before widespread conversion by the London Missionary Society during the nineteenth century. In modern times, the Cook Islands are predominantly Christian, with the largest denomination being the Cook Islands Christian Church.

== History ==
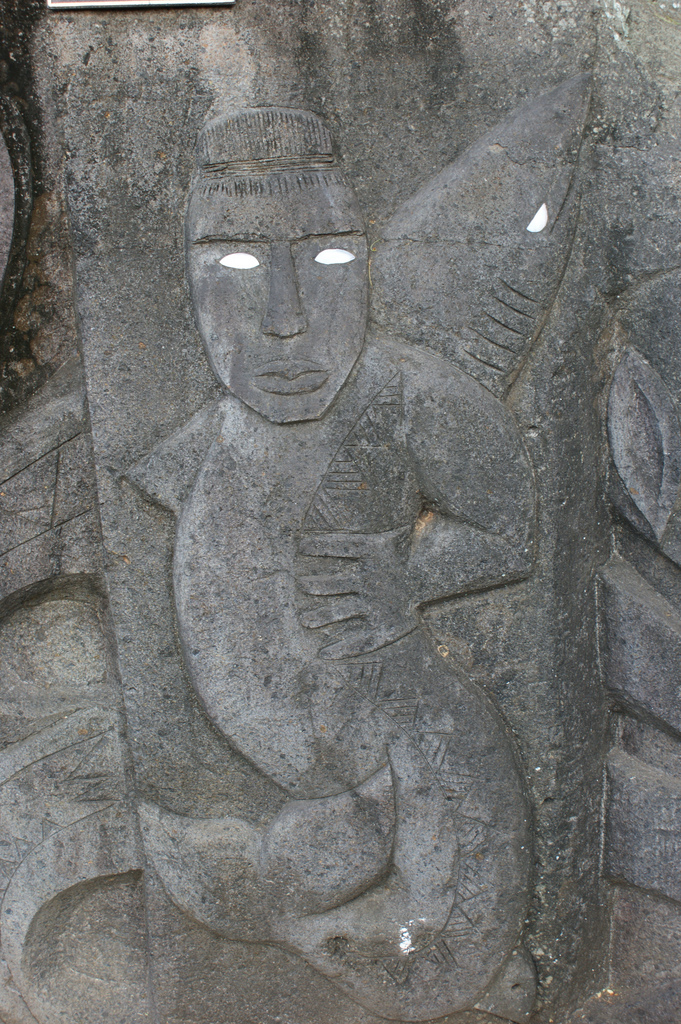
A basalt stone relief depicting the moon god Avatea, Rarotonga

=== Pre-European contact ===
The Cook Islands were settled at some point between 900 and 1200 CE by Polynesian settlers, who brought with them Polynesian mythology. Over the following centuries, this developed distinctive characteristics in the islands, forming a unique mythology local to the islands. Legends and stories were passed down in an oral tradition through songs and chants. On the island of Rarotonga, the physical landscape was heavily tied to religion, with all marae (sacred buildings) constructed oriented towards Ara Metua, the ancient road around the island.

Cook Islands mythology included Avaiki, the ancestral homeland and land of the gods; heroes such as Nganaoa; and gods & goddesses including Avatea, Ina, Marama, Papa, Rongo and Tangaroa.

=== Missionary activity and spread of Christianity ===
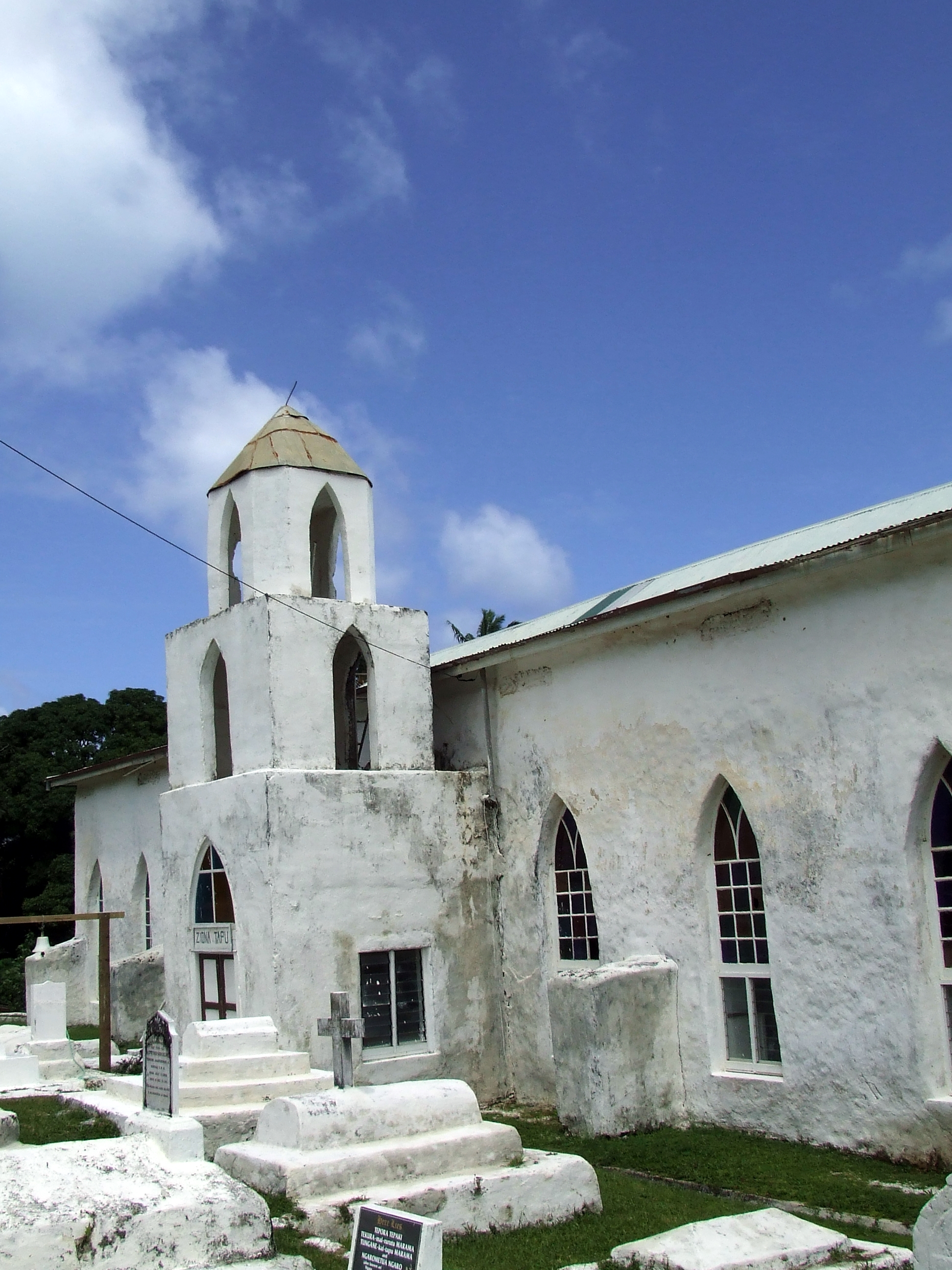
Aitutaki Church, Arutanga, the oldest Christian church in the Cook Islands

In 1821, John Williams of the London Missionary Society landed at Aitutaki and began using Tahitian converts to spread Christianity. In 1823, John and his wife Mary were on the first European vessel to officially sight Rarotonga, the Endeavour. In 1834 the couple returned to Britain to supervise the printing of the New Testament of the Bible in Cook Islands Māori. John was killed in Vanuatu in 1839, and a memorial stone was erected to him in Rarotonga that same year.

Williams had become the first recorded Reverend of the Cook Islands in 1821, at Arutanga on Aitutaki. In 1828, the London Missionary Society constructed a church in that location that is the oldest church in the Cook Islands. The Society established the Cook Islands LMS Church in 1852; in 1968 the church was renamed the Cook Islands Christian Church and made autonomous by the Cook Islands Christian Church Incorporation Act. The Cook Islands Christian Church is a Reformed Protestant Church, which has been very successful in the islands and today accounts for almost half of Cook Islanders. Other Christian denominations including Catholicism, Mormonism, Adventism and Pentecostalism have had some success in the Cook Islands as well.

=== Islam in the Cook Islands ===
In 2018, the country's first mosque, Masjid Fatimah Rarotonga, was established in Titikaveka, Rarotonga. As of November 2024, it was led by Mohammed Azam and had a congregation of Cook Islanders, Indonesians, Filipinos, Fijians and Indians.

In February 2025, Rarotonga Muslim community spokesperson Tatiana Kautai expressed concern about alleged rising Islamophobia in Cook Islands society, the media and social media. She cited the removal of Masjid Fatimah Rarotonga's mosque pin on Google Maps and the emergence of a Cook Islands Christian Movement seeking to lobby the Cook Islands government to declare the island state a Christian country. The Cook Islands Christian Movement has also challenged the Crimes Amendment Act 2023, which decriminalised homosexuality in the island state.

In early March 2025, the Cook Islands Christian Church proposed a constitutional amendment to declare the Cook Islands a Christian country. The Cook Islands Parliament's Religious Organisation Special Select Committee heard submissions on the constitutional amendment in Rarotonga and the outer islands. Cook Islands opposition leader Tina Browne described the proposed amendment as in conflict with Article 64 on the Cook Islands Constitution, which guarantees freedom of religion for all.

== Demographics ==
The majority of Cook Islanders are Protestant Christians, with almost half of the islands' population being members of the Cook Islands Christian Church. There are significant numbers of Catholics, and smaller numbers of Mormons and Jehovah's Witnesses. Non-Christian faiths, such as Hinduism, Buddhism and Islam, are found in small numbers mostly among non-indigenous inhabitants. While the island nation's census does not calculate the number of Muslims, it is estimated that in 2006 about 0.06% of the islands' population was Muslim.

According to the 2021 Cook Islands census
Religious affiliation	Percent
Christian	79.9
Cook Islands Christian Church	43.1
Catholic	16.7
Seventh-day Adventist	8.3
Church of Jesus Christ of Latter-day Saints	3.9
Assemblies of God	3.6
Jehovah's Witness	2.2
Apostolic	2.1
Other	4.5
Irreligion or not stated	15.6
Total	100

== See also ==
- Culture of the Cook Islands
- Demographics of the Cook Islands
- Islam in the Cook Islands
