= Culture of the Cook Islands =

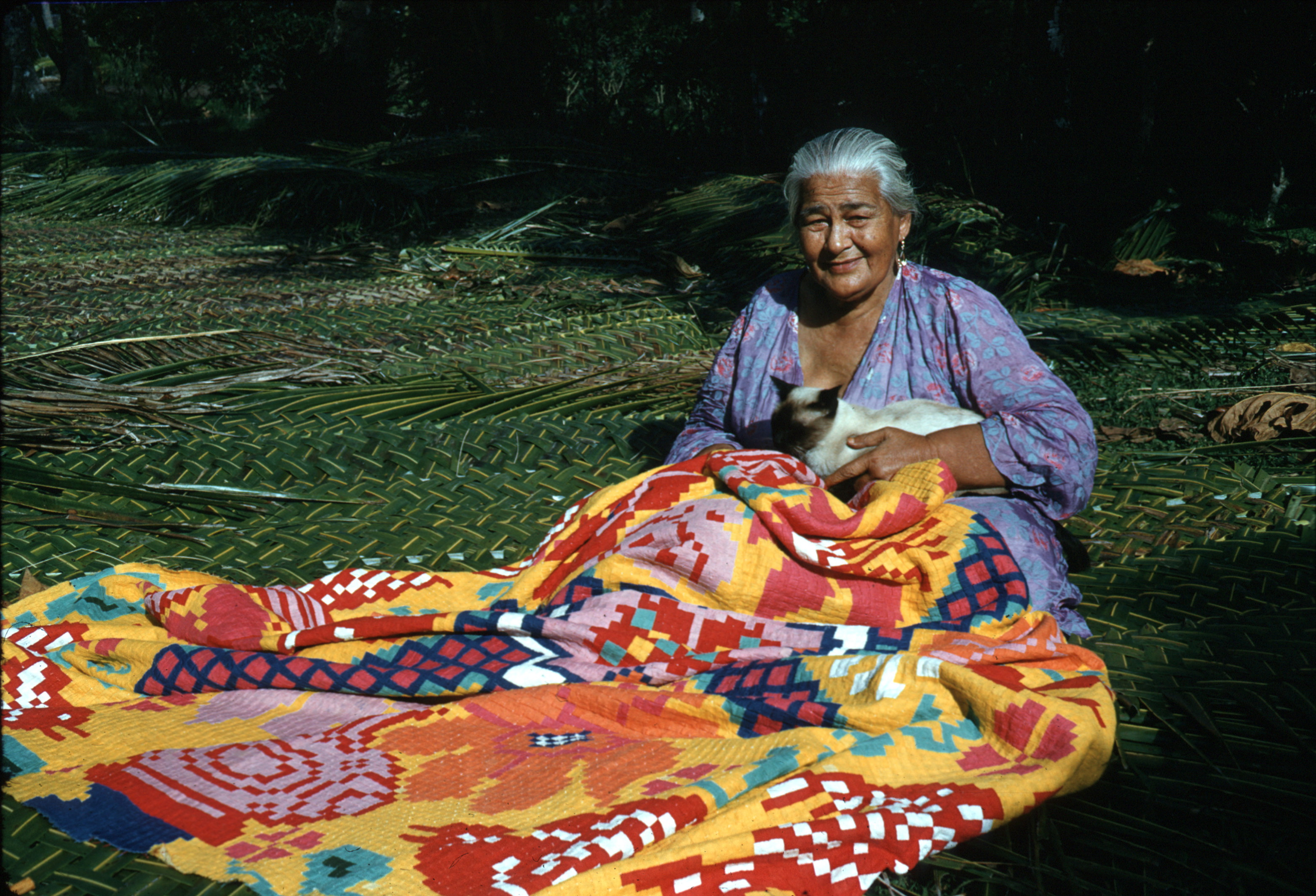
A woman sewing a tivaevae patchwork quilt

The culture of the Cook Islands reflects the traditions of its fifteen islands as a Polynesian island country, spread over 1,800,000 square kilometres (690,000 sq mi) in the South Pacific Ocean. The traditions are based on the influences of those who settled the Cook Islands over many centuries. Polynesian people from Tahiti settled in the Cook Islands in the 6th century. Portuguese captain Pedro Fernandes de Queirós made the first recorded European landing in the islands in the early 17th century, and well over a hundred years later, in the 18th century, the British navigator, Captain James Cook arrived, giving the islands their current name. Missionaries developed a written language, bringing schools and Christianity to the Cook Islands in the early 19th century. Cook Islands Māori, also known as Māori Kūki 'Āirani or Rarotongan, is the country's official language.

The Culture Division of the Cook Islands Government supports and preserves the country's national heritage. One of the popular traditional dances of the Cook Islands is the ura, a sacred ritual usually performed by a female who moves her body to tell a story, accompanied by intense drumming by at least five drummers. The craft of the locals can be seen in dresses, sarongs, and jewellery crafted with local products, such as shells, and an important practice among women is tivaevae, a type of quilting. Typical cuisine consumed in the Cook Island is fresh seafood such as octopus or clams, lamb or suckling pig, and fresh fruit, especially coconut. Rugby union and bowling are popular sports, and the islands hosted the 1986 Pacific Cup and the 1998 Polynesia Cup. The House of Ariki (Are Ariki) offers dignity but limited power to the ariki, historical chiefs in the islands' social hierarchy.

== Background ==
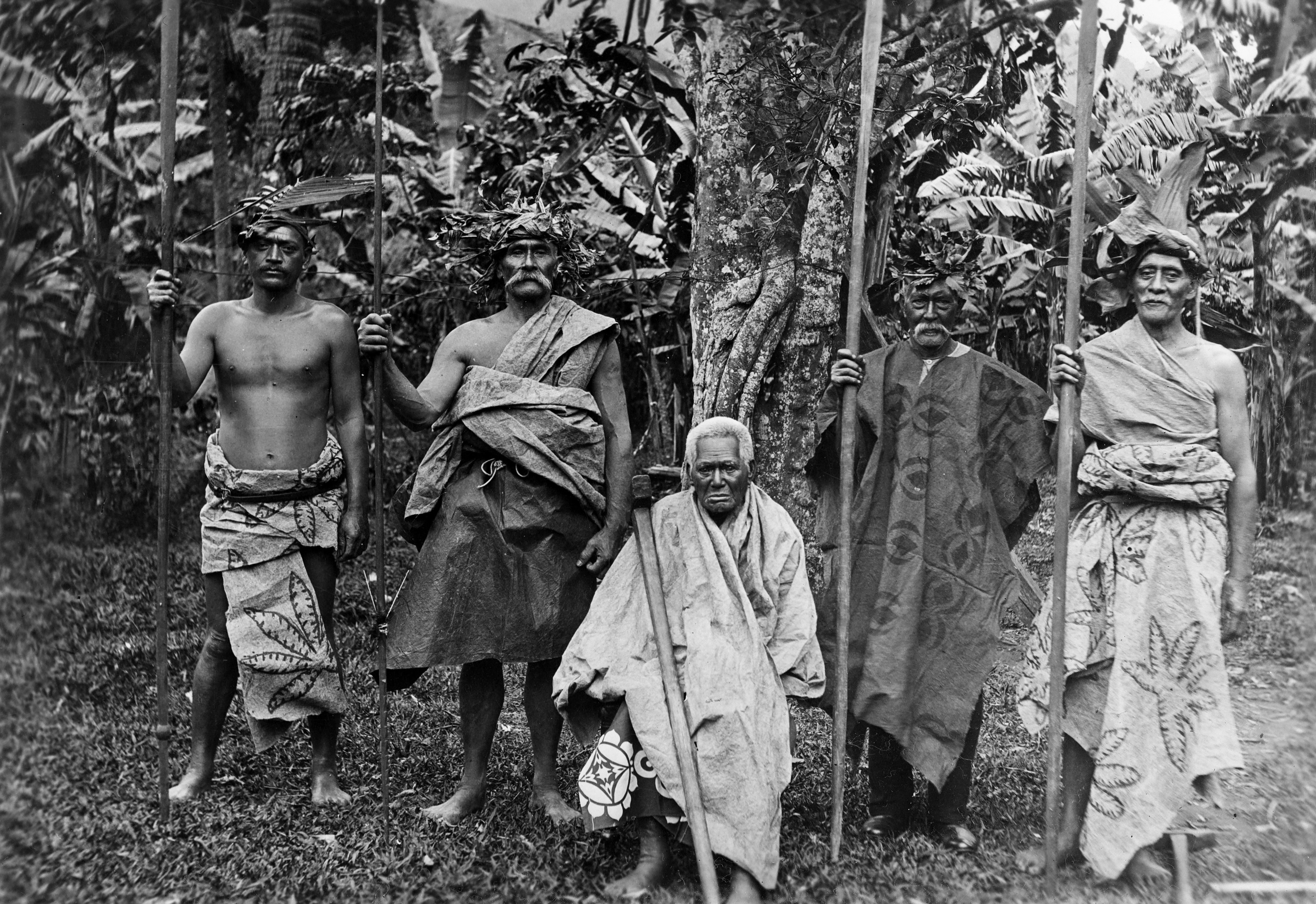
Makea Karika Ariki (sitting) and nobles of the Makea Karika tribe.

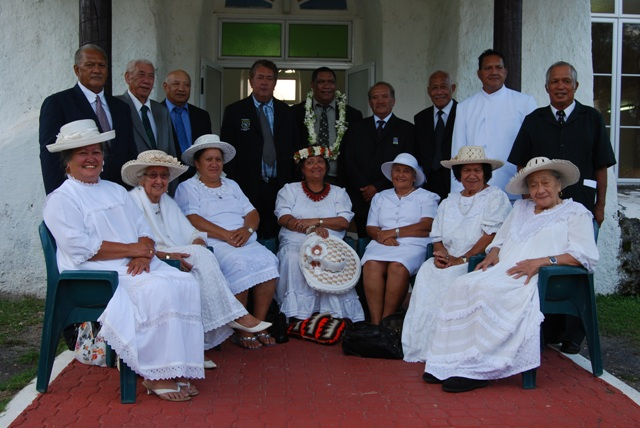
Arikis at the opening of the 39th Annual General Meeting of the House of Ariki.

Polynesian settlers arrived from Tahiti in the 6th century. In 1606, the Portuguese captain, Pedro Fernandes de Queirós, was the first European recorded as landing in the islands. Captain Cook, who gave the islands their current name, arrived in 1773 and 1777. Missionaries from the early 1800s brought schools and Christianity, and developed a written language.

=== Social hierarchy ===
Social hierarchy and tapu (sacred matters) in the Cook Islands was controlled by ariki (high chiefs), with typically between three and six per island. Each ariki was a ruler of an ivi or ngati (tribe). Lesser noble ranks in the social hierarchy were the mataiapo and rangatira (minor chiefs). The chief's control, which could neither be gained or lost, was established by his mana (power), which derived from his birth, achievements and status. However, an ariki with declining popularity could be perceived to be lacking in mana, which might lead to a loss of social control.

Ariki controlled Ariki, mataiapo and rangatira titles continue to be passed down through family lines, and the associated ancient ceremonies and traditions continue to be practised in the present day. The House of Ariki (Are Ariki), a parliamentary body in the Cook Islands, was established in 1967. It is composed of high chiefs, with limited power.

Some women's organisations, such as the Cook Islands National Council of Women and the Cook Islands Business and Professional Women's Association, have difficulty separating themselves from national politics. The largest women's organisations, Cook Islands Christian Church Ekalesia Vainetini, Dorcas, National Catholic Women's League, and Women's Harvesters, are affiliated with local churches.

== Religion ==
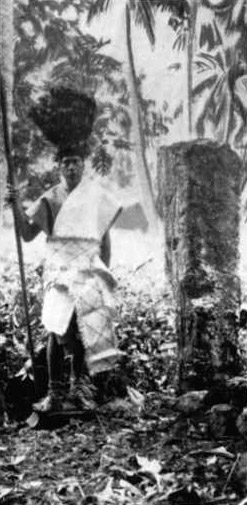
High priest (ta'unga nunui) at Arai-te-Tonga marae with the pillar stone of investiture.

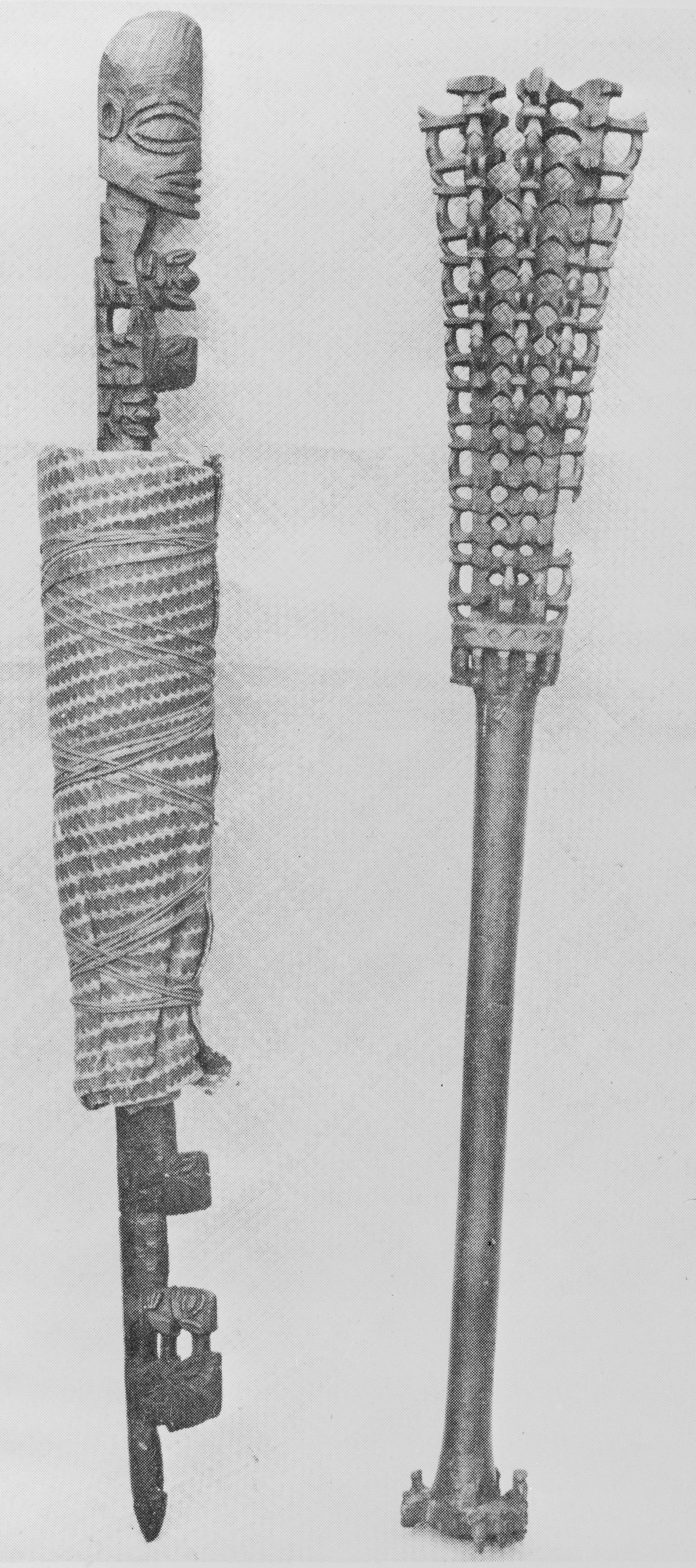
Wooden carvings of a Staff god (atua rakau) and a Slab god (unu).

Cook Islands mythology has commonality with Polynesian myths and legends. Avaiki is known as the land of the gods and ancestors. Prominent figures include Avatea, Ina, Marama, Nganaoa, Papa, Rongo, Tangaroa, Vaitakere, Varima te takere, and Vatea. A belief in the mystic power by the use of incantations and charms or purepure (see witchcraft) was passed down through the generations. Tales of the supernatural and spirits is common practice in the islands by people of all generations and are used to explain many of the more unusual events. Tupapaku is woven into discussions on social relationships, proprietary rights, and historical events. Spirit shelters exist in the islands, typically made by children who weave them out of plantain stems.

The missionary, John Williams, was instrumental in the conversion of Cook Islanders to Christianity. He brought two Tahitian missionaries to Aitutaki in 1821 who converted the island's population. A subsequent group of Polynesian missionaries went to Mauke and Atiu, while Mitiaro followed next in 1823. Williams encountered difficulty in converting the population on Rarotonga whose tribes were divided under ariki (chiefs) and ta'unga (priests). Aaron Buzacott, a Congregationalist colleague of Williams, a central figure in the missionary work of the London Missionary Society in the South Seas, lived on Rarotonga between 1828 and 1857. Takamoa Theological College, founded by Aaron Buzacott, trains pastors for the Cook Islands Christian Church, which is the nation's largest religious denomination.

== Language and literature ==
Cook Islands Māori, officially named Māori Kūki 'Āirani, and also known as Rarotongan, is the nation's official language. There are several mutually intelligible dialects, spoken on the fifteen islands. Rakahanga-Manihiki and Penrhyn are examples. The Cook Islands Maori Dictionary was eventually published in 1995 and included language studies by Dr. Jasper Base of the University of London (1957–1985), the compilation assistance of Raututi Taringa (1957–1959), and the works of an Advisory Committee which was established by Dr. Jasper Buse established in 1960. Pukapukan developed in isolation on the island of Pukapuka and is considered by scholars as a distinct language.

Naming is a symbolic tradition of the islands' Maori population. Names form a link not only to ancestors, descendants, and friends, but to titles and land, as well as events and relationships. Dreamed or created, name change are not limited to events, such as birth, marriage, and death, but can also occur in association with a bad omen. First names are interchangeable between men and women, while surnames can vary from person to person within a family unit.

Considering the relatively small size of the islands, it has a notable literary scene. Tuepokoina Utanga Morgan is credited with writing musical compositions and poetry and producing folk opera. Composer and poet Teate Makirere, who toured as communications adviser of the Pacific Conference of Churches, has been commended for his secular writings. Paiere Mokoroa and Merota Ngamata are known for their writings on the culture of Atiu Island and Pukapuka, and Tingota Simiona wrote an extensive collection of stories based on the legends of Atiu Island. One of the well-known Cook Islands children's story tellers and poets was Mona Matepi, who produced the Mokopets television series of 52 episodes for children. There is also a number of popular songs and dramas of unknown artists, presented on television and radio, which are available on cassettes and CDs. Radio programs in the islands are broadcast in the native language, English and Tahitian.

== Music and dance ==
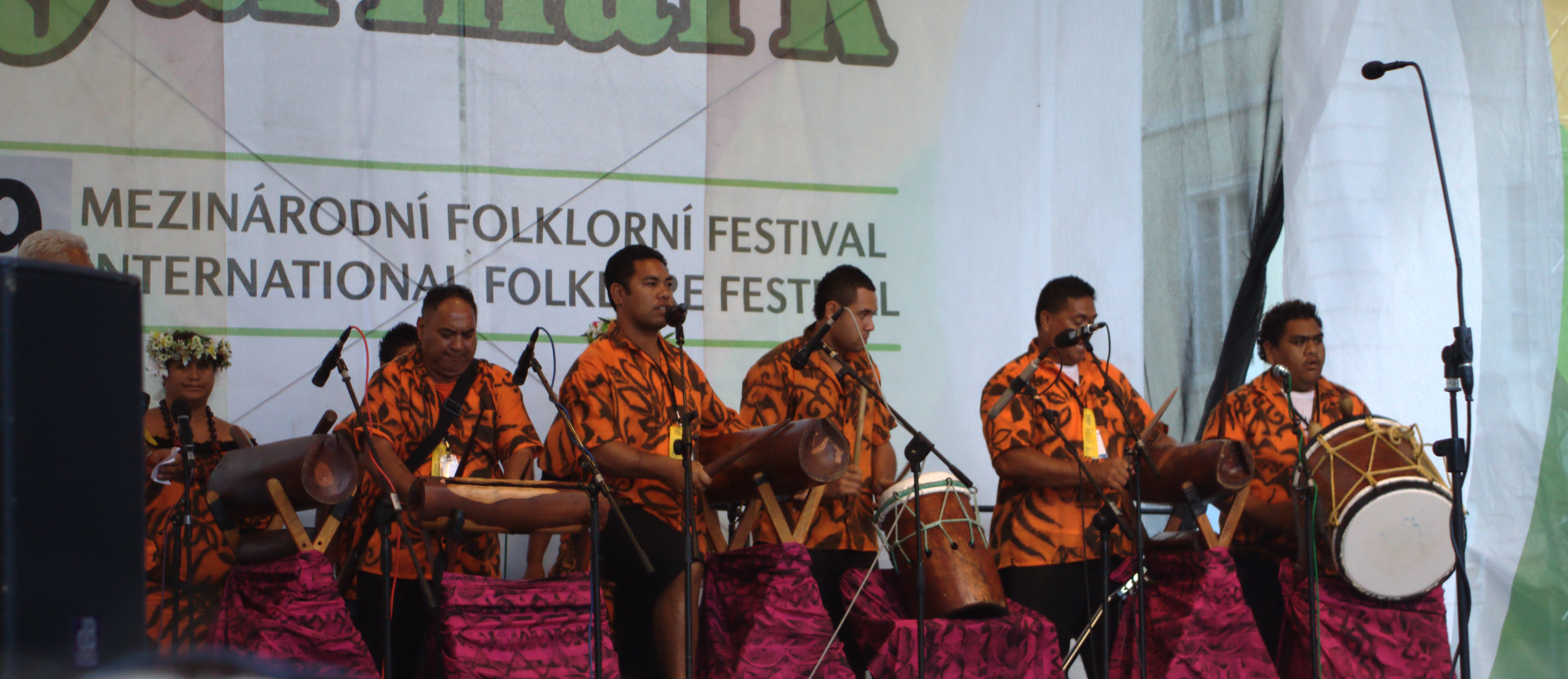
Drummers from the Akirata Folk Dance Group.

The music of the Cook Islands is characterised by heavy drums and ukuleles. Men perform the hura, which is the equivalent of the Hawaiian hula, locking their feet on the ground and keeping their shoulders steady. Drums form part of an ensemble. Performing groups include the Cook Islands National Arts Theatre, Arorangi Dance Troupe, Betela Dance Troupe, Akirata Folk Dance Troupe, and Te Ivi Maori Cultural Dance Troupe. Raro Records is the main specialist in music retail on the islands.

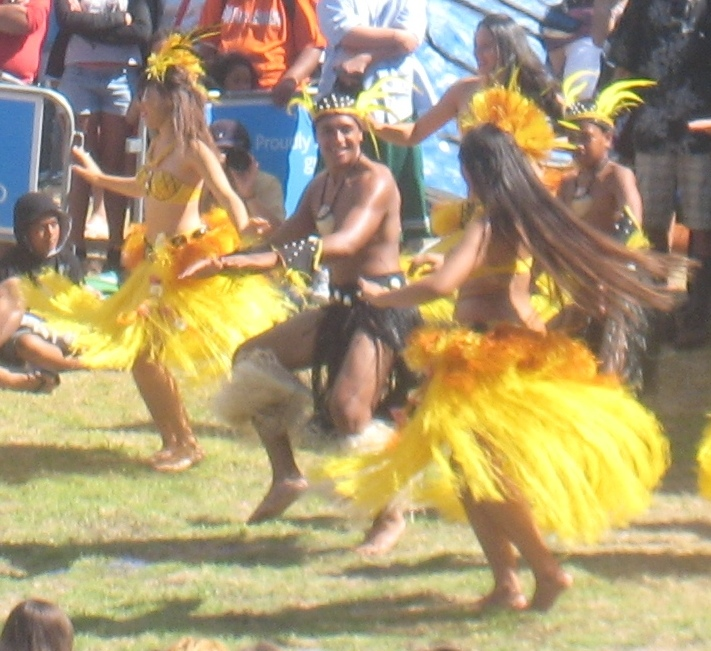
Cook Islands dancers at Auckland's Pasifika Festival.

Dances are performed at multicultural festivals. One of the popular traditional dances of the Cook Islands is the Maori Ura, a sacred ritual usually performed by a female who moves her body to tell a story, accompanied by intense drumming by at least 5 drummers. Moving the hips, legs and hands give off different gestures to the audience to tell a tale, typically related to the natural landscape such as the ocean and birds and flowers, but also feelings of love and sadness. The ura dance has three distinct components; the ura pa'u (drum dances), korero (legends) and kaparima (action songs). To perform the ura, women typically wear a pareu and a kikau (grass) skirt, with flowers and shell headbands and necklaces known as ei. Men during the dance are said to "vigorously flap their knees in a semi-crouched position while holding their upper bodies steady", and they typically wear kikau skirts and headbands. The drumming group, an integral part of the Ura, typically consists of a lead drummer (pate taki), support lead (pate takirua), a double player (tokere or pate akaoro) playing wooden gongs, and two other players playing skin drums (pa'u and mango). Travel writer David Stanley asserts that the finest performances of the Ura are put on in Rarotonga.

A sexually charged variant of the ura dance is known at the ura piani in which both men and women are involved in telling the story. Other variations include the ura rore (stilt dance), ura tairiri (fan dance), ura korare (spear dance), and ura rama (torch dance). Aside from the Ura dance and its components such as the korero and kaparima, there are several other genres of music and dance in the Cook Islands including dance dramas (peu tupuna), religious pageants (nuku), formal chants (pe'e), celebratory chants ('ute), and polyphonic choral music ('imene tapu). Like the ura, these are also often accompanied by drums.

== Art ==
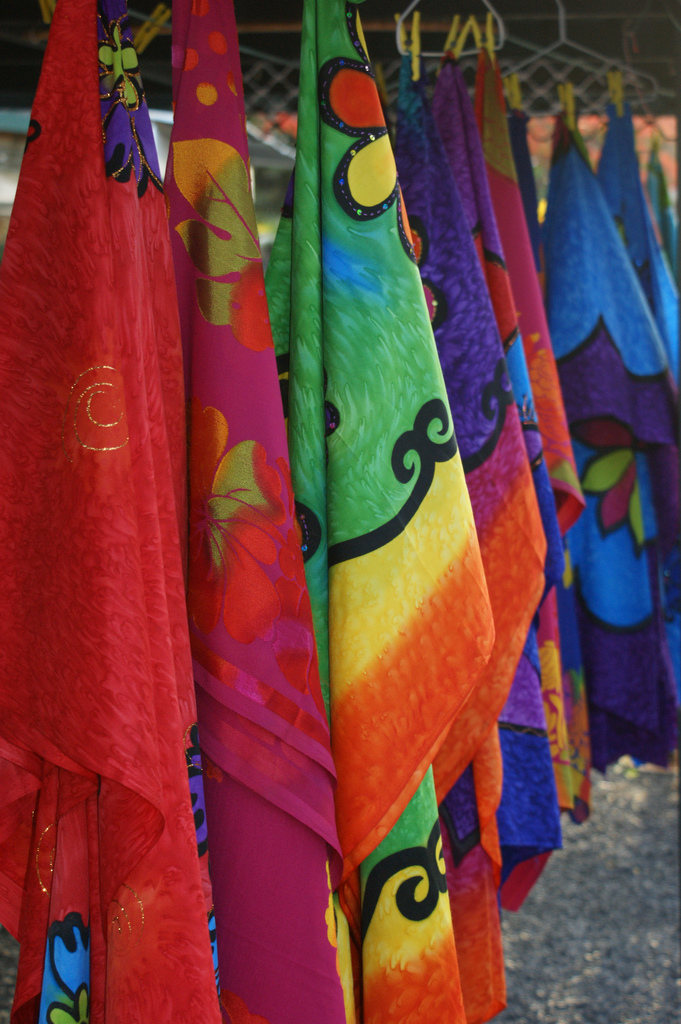
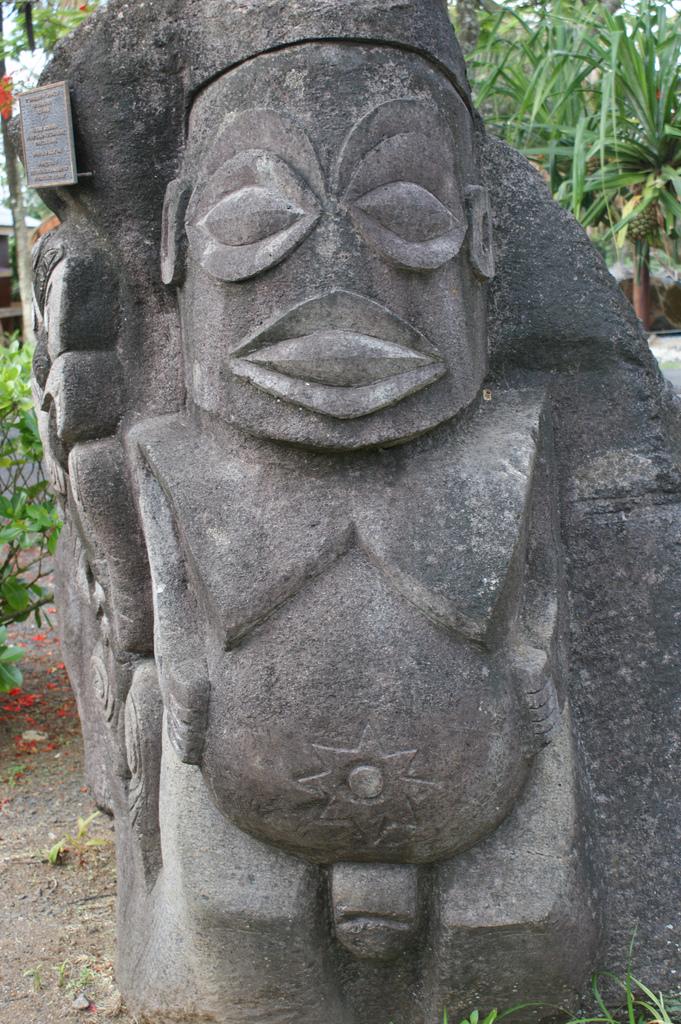
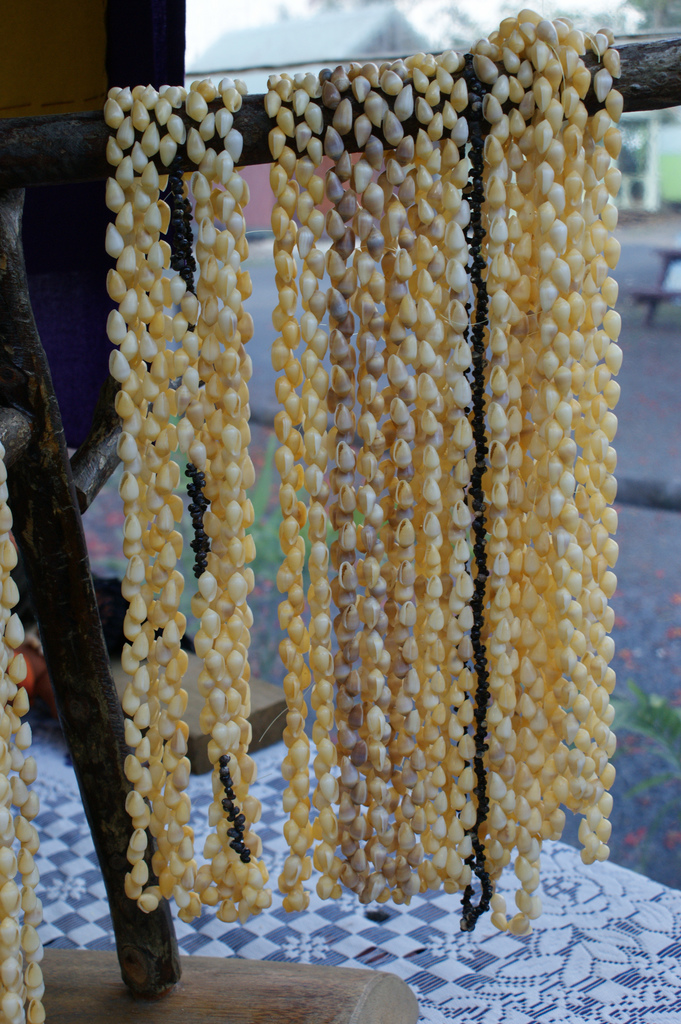
Left: colourful pareu. Center: stone sculpture. Right: shell necklaces.

Local residents have developed their own style in clothing and jewellery, using local products, such as shells. Giving somebody a shell necklace and placing it around the recipients neck is a goodwill and love gesture. They make a type of sarong, called a pareu, which is typically brightly coloured. Like the other islands of Oceania such as Fiji and Samoa, the Cook Islanders are known for their hand-painted and silk-screened dress fabrics. An important practice among women is tivaevae, a type of quilting.

The islanders have many fine carvers, especially at Michael Tavioni's workshop and Island Craft, the latter of which produces items like spears and masks. Items are sold in places like Punanga Nui Market, Beachcomber Pearl Market shop and Bergman and Sons. Landscape artist Judith Kunzle sells her drawings and paintings in her home studio and several of the crafts stores, several of which have featured in numerous publications and postcards of the islands.

Mahiriki Tangaroa produced a series of paintings depicting pre-Christianity gods of the Cook Islands titled Kaveinga – Angels of the Ocean, presented by Bergman Gallery in Venice, Italy as part of European Cultural Centre: Personal Structures in 2022 coinciding Venice Biennale. Other notable Contemporary Cook Islands artists includes Ian George, Kay George, Sylvia Marsters, Nina Oberg Humphries, Ani O'Neil and Joan Gragg. Bergman Gallery is a contemporary dealer gallery in Rarotonga and regularly participates in art fairs around the world, especially Aotearoa Art Fair (previously known as Auckland Art Fair)

Vereara Maeva-Taripo and Tungane Broadbent are important tivaevae artists from the Cook Islands, and both artists have been displayed in Queensland Art Gallery and are in the collection in Cook Islands National Museum and Queensland Art Gallery, as well as Christchurch Art Gallery.

== Cuisine ==
Due to the island location and the fact that the Cook Islands produce a significant array of fruits and vegetables, natural local produce, especially coconut, features in many of the dishes of the islands as does fresh seafood. While most food is imported from New Zealand, there are several Growers' Associations, such as Mangaian, Ngatangiia, Penrhyn, Puaikura, and Rakahanga, which contribute produce for local cuisine. Typical local cuisine includes arrowroot, clams, octopus, and taro, and seasonings such as fresh ginger, lime, lemon, basil, garlic and coconut. Rukau is a dish of taro leaves cooked with coconut sauce and onion. A meal of octopus is known locally as Eke, and suckling pig is known as Puaka. Ika mata is a dish of raw fish marinated with lemon or lime and served with coconut cream, while Pai Ika and Keke Ika are also local fish fare. Poke is a dessert which can be made in one of two ways, either with banana and coconut milk or with pawpaw. Soursop, oranges and mangos are popular as juices. Coconut water, local beer (Cooks Lager), and coffee are popular beverages among the Cook Islanders.

== Sports ==
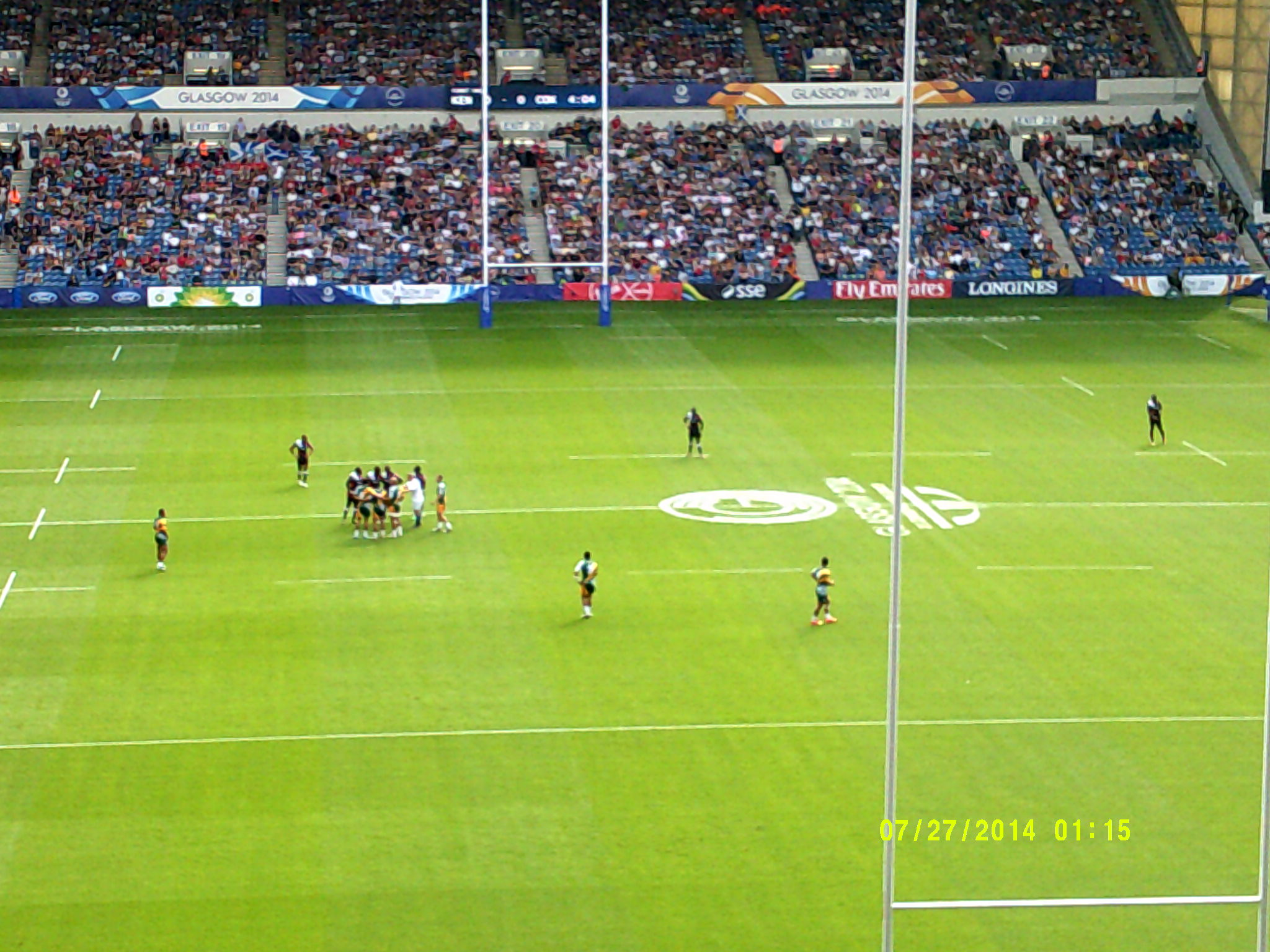
Kenya playing the Cook Islands at the 2014 Commonwealth Games.

Like in many of the other islands of the Pacific, Rugby Union is a popular sport. The Cook Islands national rugby union team began playing on the international stage in 1971. Sevens rugby is also played and has its own association, as does netball, sevens rugby, weightlifting and powerlifting, table tennis, Tae Kwon-Do, and volleyball. The Cook Islands Round Cup is the top division of the Cook Islands Football Association and plays at the National Stadium among other venues.

Bowling is popular, and the Cook Islands have at least six clubs including Ikurangi Women's Bowling Club, Parekura Men's Bowling Club, Parekura Women's Bowling Club, and Rarotonga Men's Bowling Club. It is presided over by the Cook Islands Lawn Bowling Federation, and the Cook Islands Bowls Carnival Tour is organised annually. There are also various badminton, motorcycle, golf, racing, sailing, squash, and canoeing clubs.

On a broader scale, the Cook Islands Sports & Olympic Association, Rarotonga Amateur Athletics Association, Tauvaine Sports & Cultural Association, and Tupapa-Maraerena Sports Association are notable associations. The Cook Islands Fisherman's Association, Cook Islands Game Fishing Club, and the Ngatangiia Fishermen's Club support fishing enthusiasts. The country hosted the 1986 Pacific Cup and the 1998 Polynesia Cup.

== Administration and preservation ==
Native antiquities, defined as "native relics, articles with ancient native tools and according to native methods, and all other articles or things of historical or scientific value or interest and relating to the Cook Islands" are protected by the Cook Islands Amendment Act 1950. Cultural events are coordinated by the Cook Islands National Arts Council, which was established in 1985 by an Act of Parliament. The administrative mechanism was specially oriented towards promotion of culture of the islands and a Cultural Division was functional. In the late 1980s, the Prime Minister, Geoffrey Henry a keen enthusiast in promoting island's culture, established a number of monuments and also created the Ministry of Cultural Development, he backed it up with financial resources. The activity got a boost because of creation of expressive arts, large influx of tourist into the island, and the knowledge assimilated and adopted by the islanders on the culture of the other regions. The Ministry of Cultural Development Act 1990 repealed the National Arts Council Act 1981–82 and provided for the preservation and enhancement of the country's cultural heritage, encouragement of its cultural art forms, and maintenance of the unique cultural national identity of its people.

The Cook Island Museum promotes the cultural heritage of the entire region including Pacific Islanders. It represents a large variety of material culture. The islands' history, as well as its traditional techniques in dancing, fishing, weaving, woodcarving, medicine, and food preparation are also profiled at the Cook Islands Cultural Village.

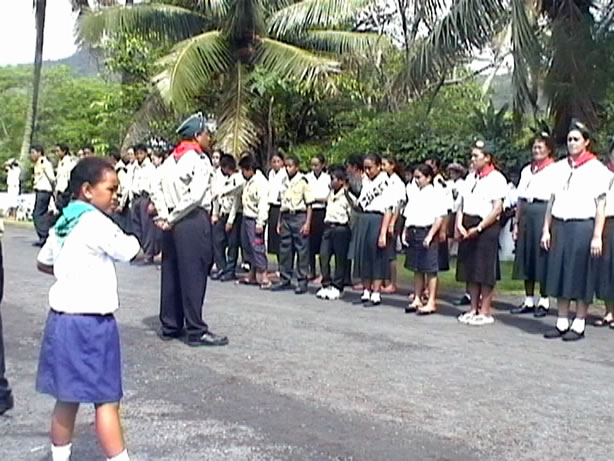
Troop reviews on ANZAC Day

Date	Public holidays
1 January	New Year's Day
2 January	Day after New Year's Day
The Friday before Easter Sunday	Good Friday
The day after Easter Sunday	Easter Monday
25 April	ANZAC Day
The first Monday in June	Queen's Birthday
During July	Rarotonga Gospel Day
4 August	Constitution Day (Te Maevea Nui Celebrations); National Day
26 October	Gospel Day
25 December	Christmas
26 December	Boxing Day
