= Atea =

Polynesian deity

Atea is a deity in several Polynesian cultures, including the Marquesas and Tuamotu Islands, and New Zealand.

== Marquesas Islands ==
In the mythology of the Marquesas Islands, Atea is the giver of light. In one legend Atea and Tāne are brothers, the sons of Toho. Another tradition relates that Atea (as light) evolved himself, and then brought forth Ono. Joining forces, they broke up the boundless darkness of the underworld (Po), where Tanaoa, lord of darkness, and Mutu-hei (silence) had lived for eternity. Atea and Ono made war on Tanaoa and Mutu-hei, and defeated them. They confined the gods of night within set boundaries. Out of the struggle came forth Atanua, the dawn. Atea then married Atanua, and their children include the lesser gods and humankind (Tregear 1891:29).

== Tuamotu Islands ==
In the mythology of the Tuamotu islands, Atea is killed by Tāne, his second son (Meletinsky 2000:421). Their first son, Tahu, dies of starvation and the two gods switch sexes. Later, Atea tries to kidnap Tane, but Tane escapes to earth and eventually becomes so hungry that he eats a man, thus becoming the first cannibal. Tane declares war on Atea and kills him with the lightning bolts of Fatu-tiri, his ancestor).

== New Zealand ==
Friedrich Ratzel in The History of Mankind (1896) related the Māori belief that creation commenced with the night then, after untold periods, desire awoke, then longing, then feeling. Thought followed upon the first pulse of life, or the first breath drawn; and upon thought, mental activity. Then sprang up the wish, directed to the sacred mystery or great riddle of life. Later, from the material procreative power of love develops the clinging to existence, permeated by a joyous sense of pleasure. Lastly, Atea, the universe, floated in space, divided by the difference of sex into Rangi and Papa, Heaven and Earth; and individual creations then began.

== See also ==
- Vatea, a god from Mangaia in the Cook Islands
- Wakea, a god from Hawaii
- Rangi and Papa, primordial parents in Māori tradition
