= Auparu =

Stream in Cook Islands mythology

In Cook Islands mythology, Auparu ("gentle dew") is a stream in Rarotonga, the bathing-place of nymphs or fairies.
