= Tamangori =

In Mangaian mythology, Tamangori is a legendary giant. Tamangori is described as over nine feet in height, with long black hair tied in a traditional bun. He could move silently and ate humans. He was killed by two brothers, Pa and Pe, from a village called Ivirua.
