= Atanua =

Marquesan dawn goddess

Atanua (or Atanea) in Polynesian mythology (specifically: the Marquesas Islands) is the goddess of the dawn and wife of Atea (Atea and Atanua emerged from Tanaoa, Atea first, who then made space for Atanua).

Their son is the first man, Tu-Mea. She created the seas after having a miscarriage and filling the oceans with her amniotic fluid.
