= 1994 Cook Islands referendum =

A five-part referendum was held in the Cook Islands on 24 March 1994. Voters were consulted on retaining the country's name, flag and national anthem and seats in parliament for overseas Cook Islanders, as well as whether the term of Parliament should be three, four or five years.

Voters voted in favour of retaining the islands' name, national anthem, flag and overseas seats in Parliament, and opted for a five-year term of parliament.

== Results ==
=== Retention of the country's name ===
Choice	Votes	%
For	3,984	69.80
Against	1,723	30.20
Invalid/blank votes		–
Total	5,707	100
Registered voters/turnout		
Source: Direct Democracy

=== Retention of the national anthem ===
Choice	Votes	%
For	4,623	80.20
Against	1,141	19.80
Invalid/blank votes		–
Total	5,764	100
Registered voters/turnout		
Source: Direct Democracy

=== Retention of the national flag ===
Choice	Votes	%
For	2,805	52.40
Against	2,548	47.60
Invalid/blank votes		–
Total	5,353	100
Registered voters/turnout		
Source: Direct Democracy

=== Retention of overseas seats in Parliament ===
Choice	Votes	%
For	3,322	56.54
Against	2,554	43.46
Invalid/blank votes		–
Total	5,876	100
Registered voters/turnout		
Source: Direct Democracy

=== Parliamentary term ===
Choice	Votes	%
Five years	2,559	41.78
Three years		
Four years		
Invalid/blank votes		–
Total	6,125	100
Registered voters/turnout		
Source: Direct Democracy
