= Energy in the Cook Islands =

The Cook Islands is a net importer of energy, in the form of petroleum products. Total energy consumption was 1,677,278,000 BTU (1.77 TJ) in 2017, of which 811,000,000 (0.86 TJ) was in the form of oil. In 2012 47% of imported oil was used in the transport sector, 30% in aviation, and 27% for electricity generation. Electricity consumption is 31.6 GWh, from 14 MW of installed generation capacity, with most load concentrated on the main island of Rarotonga. Per-capita electricity consumption is approximately two-thirds that in the European Union. Greenhouse gas emissions total 88,810 t per year, or 10.36 t per capita.

Electricity in the Cook Islands was historically produced by diesel generators on each island. Fuel was imported from Auckland and required long sea voyages to get to the northern atolls, resulting in high costs and occasional supply disruptions. The major islands of Rarotonga and Manihiki had 24-hour electricity, but the smaller islands would often turn their power off overnight. Since 2011, the country has embarked on a programme of renewable energy development to improve its energy security and reduce greenhouse gas emissions, with a goal of reaching 100% renewable electricity by 2020.

85% of the Cook Islands' fuel and all of its jet fuel is imported by Pacific Energy.

== Governmental jurisdiction ==
The Energy Act 1998 established an Energy Division within the Ministry of Works, Energy and Physical Planning (now Infrastructure Cook Islands) responsible for energy policy and electricity inspections. Electricity on Rarotonga is provided by Te Aponga Uira (TAU), a government-owned power authority established by legislation. The environmental impact of energy projects is managed by the National Environmental Service under the Environment Act 2003. Renewable energy is coordinated by a Renewable Energy Development Division in the Office of the Prime Minister.

== Renewable energy ==
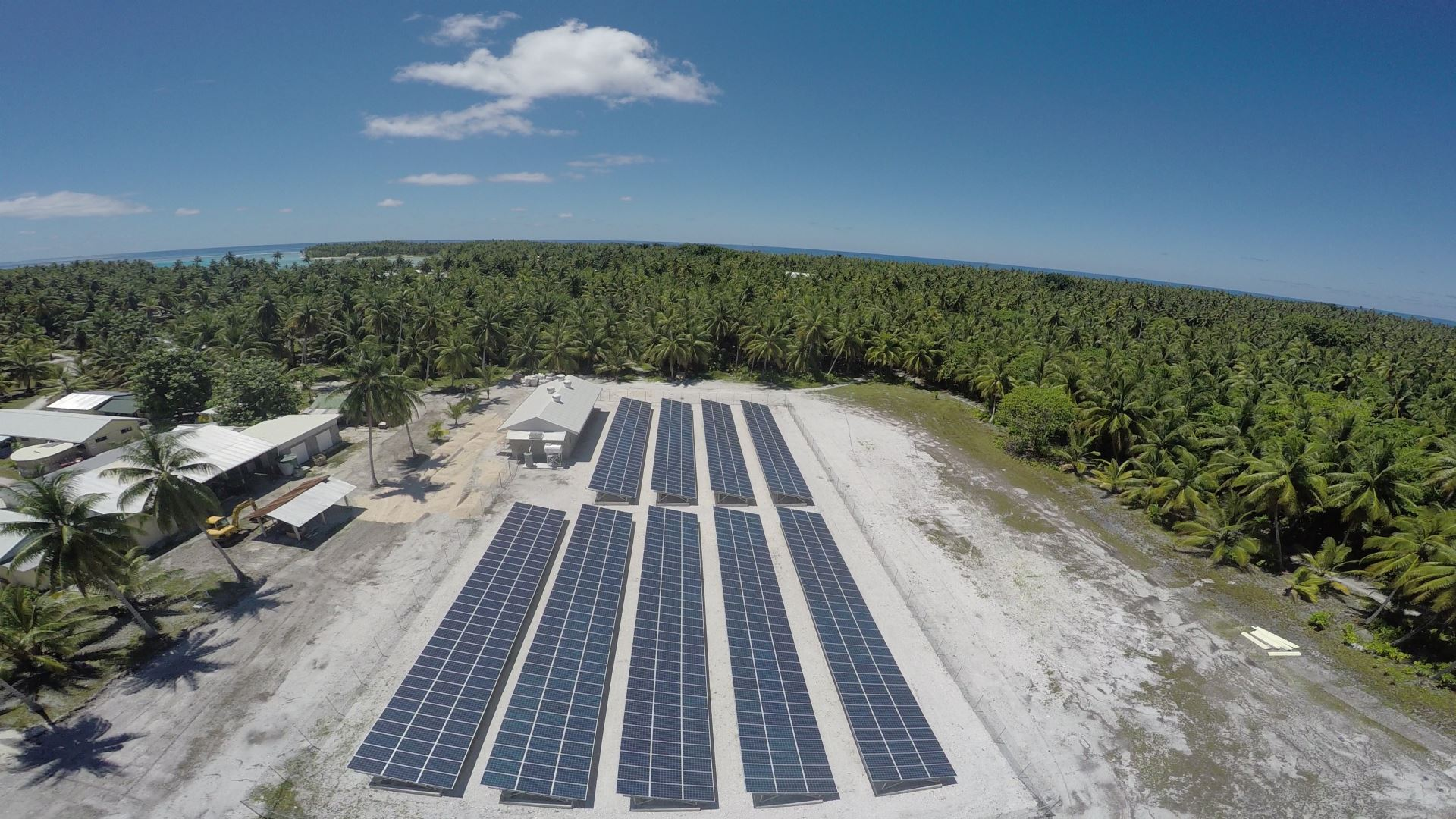
Pukapuka photovoltaic array

Renewable energy in the Cook Islands is primarily provided by solar energy and biomass. Since 2011 the Cook Islands has embarked on a programme of renewable energy development to improve its energy security and reduce greenhouse gas emissions, with an initial goal of reaching 50% renewable electricity by 2015, and 100% by 2020. The programme has been assisted by the governments of Japan, Australia, and New Zealand, and the Asian Development Bank.

Funding to provide solar panels with battery backup to the Northern atolls was provided by a NZ$20.5 million aid programme from the New Zealand Ministry of Foreign Affairs and Trade, with construction provided by PowerSmart Solar of New Zealand. The first solar site at Rakahanga was completed in September 2014. Pukapuka and Nassau were next, going online at Christmas 2014. Construction began at Tongareva on 23 February 2015 and just 10 weeks later both villages Omoka and Te Tautua were running on solar power. Manihiki was progressed at the same time. In June 2015 all of the northern atolls were fully solar powered, reducing the need to send ships north during the November to April cyclone season. A second phase of the project to provide solar farms to Atiu, Mangaia, Mauke and Mitiaro was completed in July 2019.

In 2014 construction began on the 960 kW Te Mana O Te Ra solar farm at Rarotonga International Airport. The solar farm was commissioned in October 2014. In September 2022 three battery-electric storage systems with a combined capacity of 13 MWh were installed on Rarotonga.

== See also ==
- Economy of the Cook Islands
