= Niue Rugby Football Union =

- Country: Niue
- Governing body: Niue Rugby Football Union
- National team: Niue
- First played: Turn of 20th century
- Registered players: 290
- Clubs: 7

Niue Rugby Football Union is the governing body for rugby union in Niue. It was founded in 1952, and became affiliated to the World Rugby (formerly the IRB) in 1999.

The Niue Rugby Football Union is a member of the Federation of Oceania Rugby Unions (FORU), and was also a member of the former Pacific Islands Rugby Alliance and was eligible to supply players to the Pacific Islanders team.

== Rugby union in Niue ==
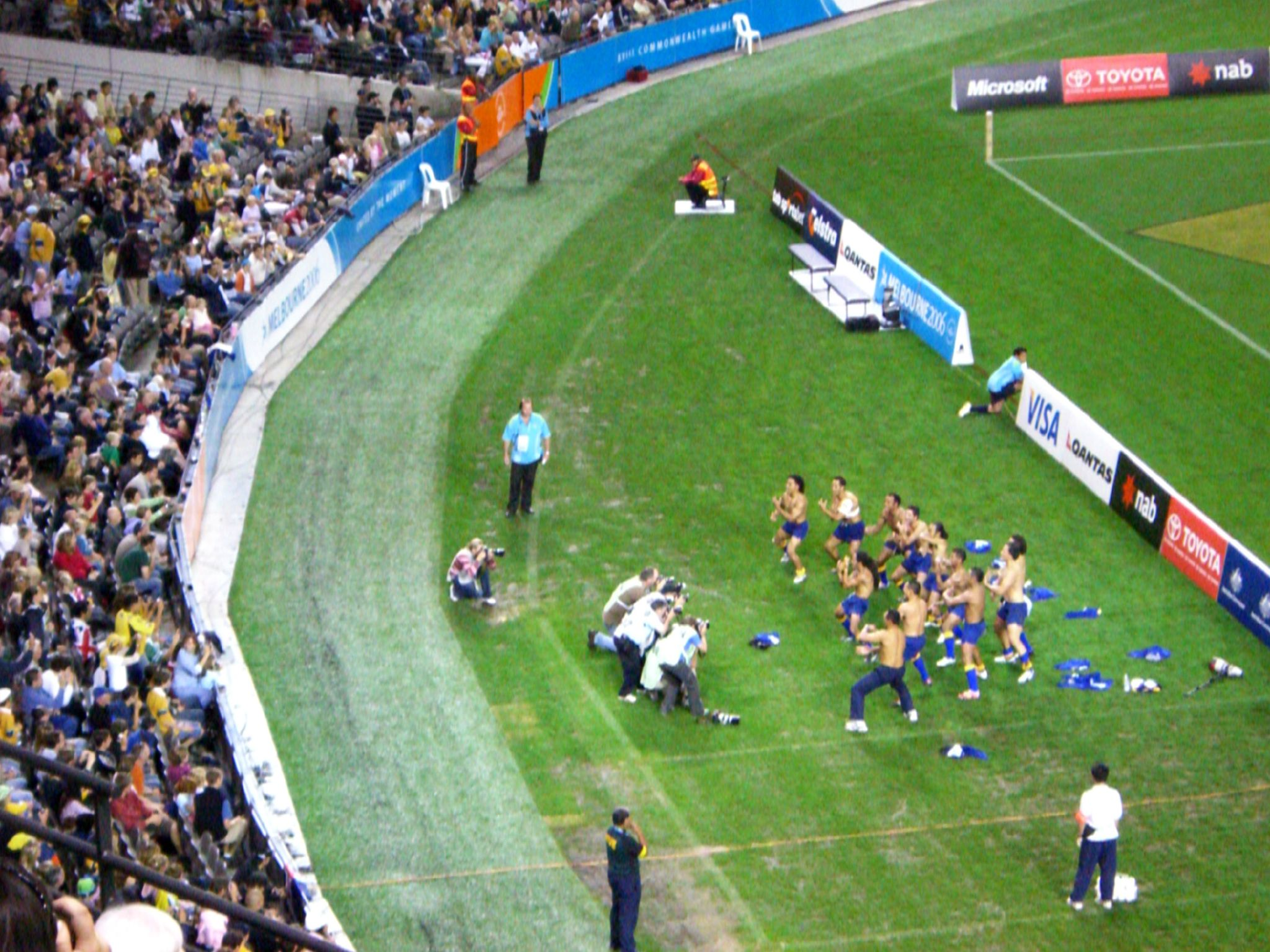
The Niue sevens team performing a haka.

Rugby union is the most popular sport in Niue. It is a tier-three rugby union playing nation.

== National team ==
The Niue national rugby union team first started playing in 1983. They have yet to qualify for the Rugby World Cup.

Niue won the current FORU Oceania Cup in 2008, defeating New Caledonia 27–5 in the final on 1 September 2008.

== History ==
Teams from Niue have competed in the Commonwealth Games.

When Niue competed in the 2001 Wellington 7s, they took a completely local-based squad, and though they scored tries against England and Canada, they were heavily beaten in most games. They beat Japan 31–19 in 2002.

The New Zealand player Frank Bunce is the great nephew of Sir Robert Rex, the former Premier of Niue.

== See also ==
- Niue national rugby union team
- Niue national rugby sevens team
- Niue Island Sports Association
