= Te Aponga Uira =

Cook Islands electricity company

Te Aponga Uira O Tumu-Te-Varovaro
- Company type: SOE
- Industry: Electricity generation Electricity retailing
- Predecessor: Cook Islands Department of Electric Power Supply
- Founded: 1991; 35 years ago
- Headquarters: Rarotonga, Cook Islands
- Revenue: CI$21,176,109 (2013)
- Net income: CI$1,643,204 (2013)
- Owner: Cook Islands Investment Corporation (100%)
- Number of employees: 54 (2013)
- Website: teaponga.com

Te Aponga Uira O Tumu-Te-Varovaro (TAU) is a Cook Islands electricity generator, distributor and retailer which provides electricity to the island of Rarotonga. It is responsible for 90% of the Cook Islands' electricity generation. It is a state-owned enterprise, wholly owned by the Cook Islands Government through the Cook Islands Investment Corporation.

Te Aponga Uira was established by the Te Aponga Uira O Tumu-Te-Varovaro Act 1991. Structured as a perpetual body corporate, it has the statutory objectives of "provid[ing] energy to all consumers in a reliable and economical manner" while operating in "an efficient and profitable manner having due regard to the interests of the community". Upon its creation it took over the assets and liabilities of the Cook Islands' Department of Electric Power Supply. Originally responsible to the Minister of Energy and with statutory advice functions, control was transferred in 1999 to the Cook Islands Investment Corporation, and a social responsibility requirement was imposed. It must also conform to government policy directives, such as the Cook Islands Renewable Electricity Chart.

The company operates two power stations on Rarotonga:

Name	Type	Location	Capacity (kW)	Derated Capacity (kW)	Annual generation (average TWh)	Commissioned	Notes
Avatiu	Diesel	Avatiu	12160	9760			
Te Mana O Te Ra	Solar PV	Avarua	960	960		2014	

The company had a net metering policy in place since November 2009 to encourage the installation of distributed solar generation, but reversed its policy in 2015 over concerns about grid stability.

During the COVID-19 pandemic the company provided free electricity to its domestic users and discounted electricity to businesses.

== See also ==
- Energy in the Cook Islands
