= Te Mana O Te Ra solar farm =

Photovoltaic power station in the Cook Islands

Te Mana O Te Ra
- Country: Cook Islands
- Location: Rarotonga International Airport
- Coordinates: 21°12′4.24″S 159°48′0.35″W
- Status: Operational
- Construction began: 2014
- Commission date: October 15, 2014
- Construction cost: NZ$3.3 million
- Owner: Te Aponga Uira

Solar farm
- Type: Flat-panel PV
- Total collector area: 1 ha

Power generation
- Nameplate capacity: 960 kW

Te Mana O Te Ra ("The Power of The Sun") is a photovoltaic power station at Rarotonga International Airport in the Cook Islands. It is the largest solar power station in the Cook Islands. It is owned and operated by Te Aponga Uira.

The array consists of 3051 solar panels and has a peak output of 960 kW. It was funded by the New Zealand Ministry of Foreign Affairs and constructed between June and September 2014 by New Zealand company Infratec Renewables Ltd. It was commissioned by Cook Islands Prime Minister Henry Puna in October 2014.

In 2017 the farm was upgraded by the addition of a 5.6 MWh battery storage system.

Electricity generated by Te Mana O Te Ra is injected into the local distribution grid via an onsite 11,000V transformer. At peak output it can supply approximately 5% of Rarotonga's electricity demand.
