= Sheraton Resort Rarotonga =

Incomplete hotel in the Cook Islands

Coordinates: 21°15′38.08″S 159°47′44.36″W

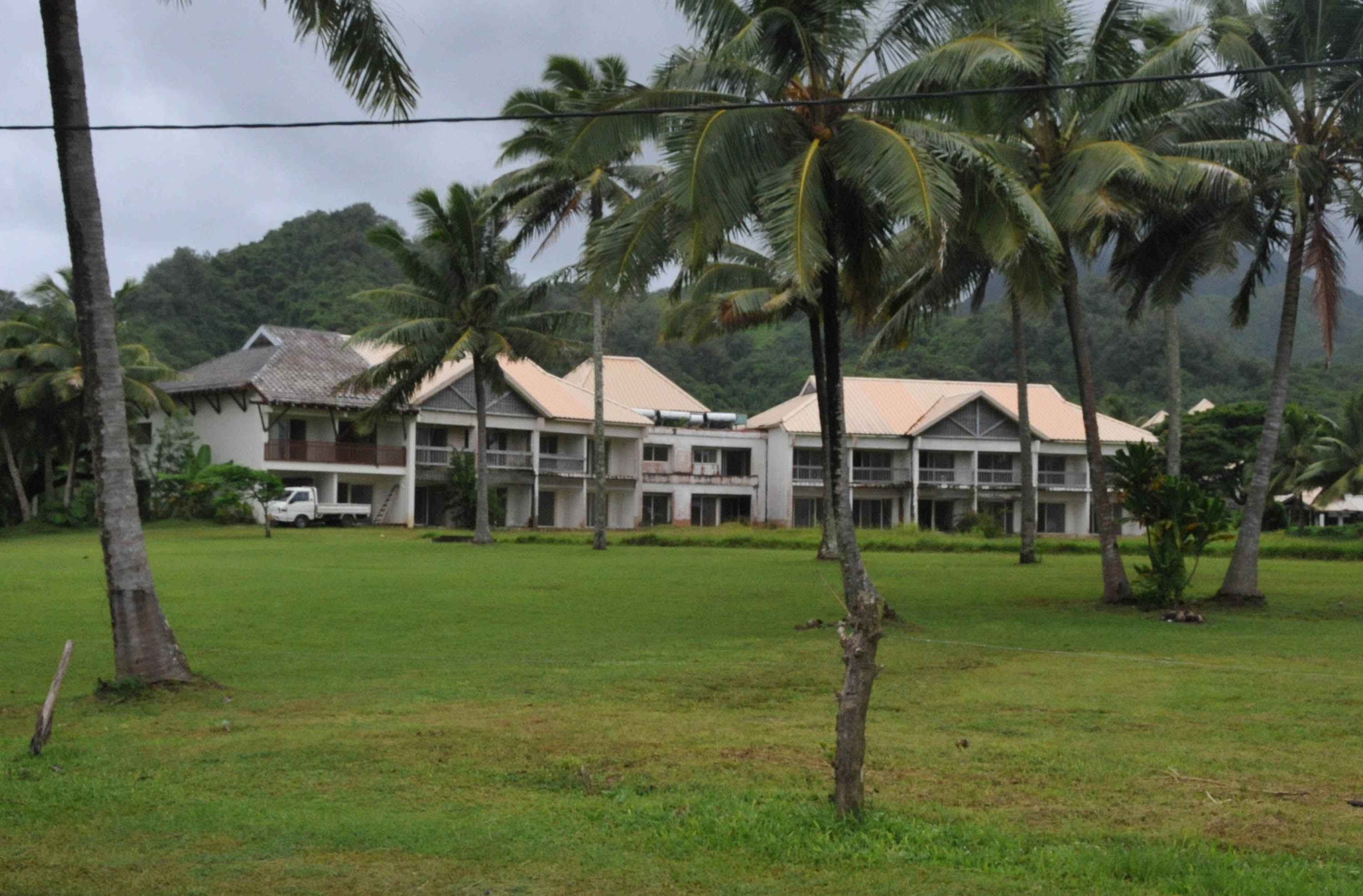
The ruins of the Sheraton Resort Rarotonga

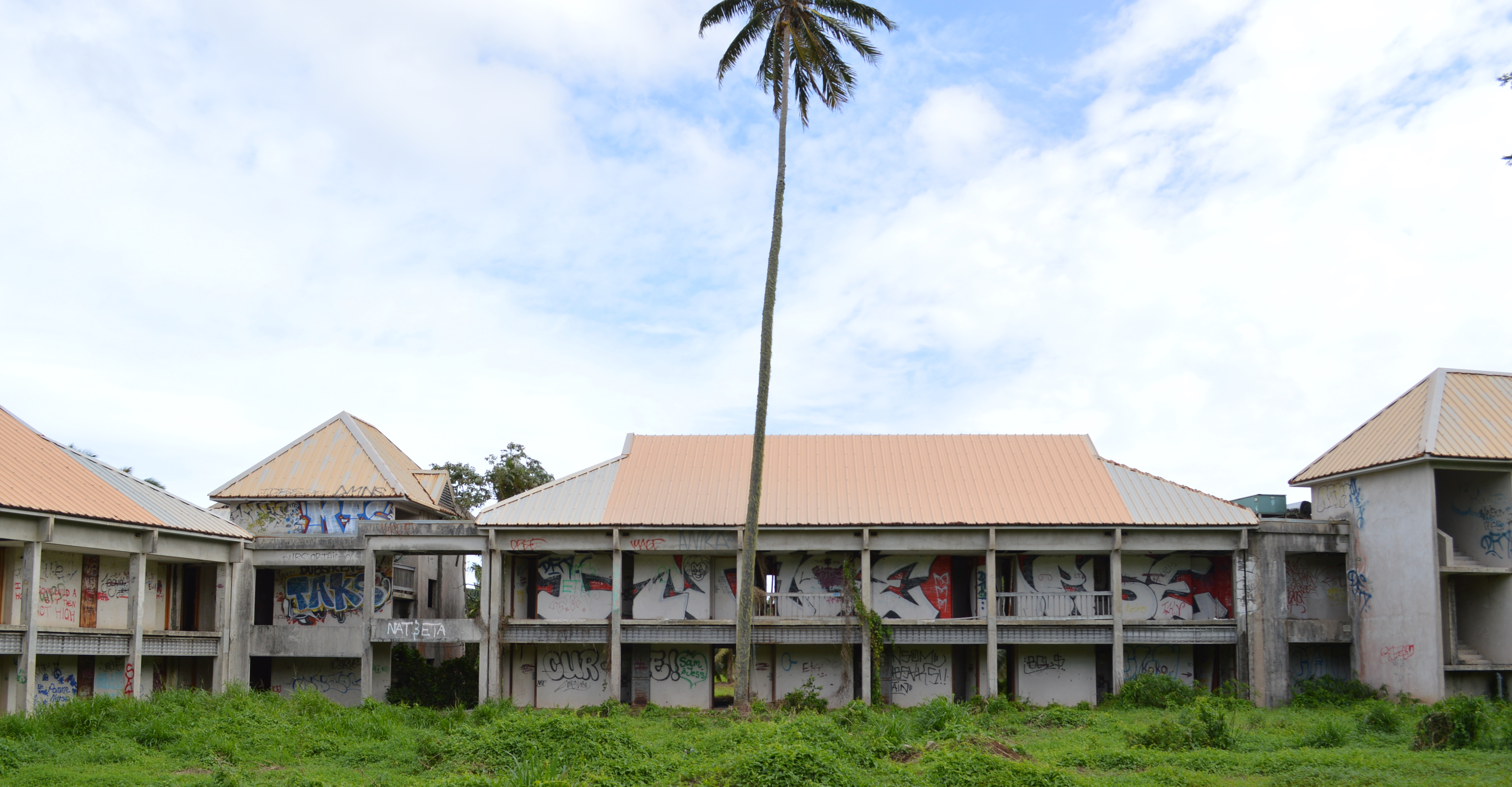
Side view of the Resort

The Sheraton Resort Rarotonga or Vaimaanga Hotel is an incomplete derelict hotel in Vaimaanga on Rarotonga in the Cook Islands. Intended to be the first five-star resort in the Cook Islands, construction on the hotel stopped in 1993, and it has remained derelict ever since. The failed development almost bankrupted the Cook Islands Government, leading to government-cost-cutting and mass-migration to New Zealand.

Planning for the resort began in 1987, when the Cook Islands Government was approached by an Italian construction company with a proposal to build a luxury hotel. Without Cabinet approval, Tourism Minister Norman George approved the project and the Cook Islands government subsequently signed a NZ$52 million deal with an Italian bank to fund the development. In 1990, at the sod-turning ceremony, the site of the hotel was "cursed" by a local family due to a dispute over ownership of the land. Shortly after construction began, the construction company was placed in receivership, and its workforce returned to Italy; 16 months later its directors were arrested for fraudulent bankruptcy. The Italian bank chose a second Italian company to complete the project, and construction restated in July 1991. In May 1993, when construction was almost complete, the Italian government withdrew its guarantee for the loan amid rumours of mafia involvement, and construction ceased. The Cook Islands government remained liable for the interest on the loan, and it grew to $120 million, almost bankrupting the country. The resulting government austerity was a major driver in a wave of emigration to New Zealand.

There have been multiple attempts to complete construction in the decades since. In 2000 New Zealand-based developer Tim Tepaki proposed to finish the resort and have it managed by the Hilton chain. In 2010 the site was purchased by New Zealand-based Mirage Group, who filed an Environmental Impact Assessment seeking approval to redevelop it in 2014. After delays and a dispute with their construction company, they put the site up for sale in 2016, then surrendered the lease. In 2017 Tim Tepaki attempted to redevelop the site a second time, with backing from the Asian Infrastructure Investment Bank. He abandoned the project in 2018. The site was then left derelict and later used as a paintball site.

In May 2022 Cook Islands Prime Minister Mark Brown announced that a local partnership would redevelop the site.
