= Cook Islands Rugby Union =

Sports governing body in the Cook Islands

- Sport: Rugby union
- Founded: 1989; 37 years ago
- World Rugby affiliation: 1995
- President: Sean Smith
- Website: www.rugby.co.ck

The Cook Islands Rugby Union is the governing body for rugby union in the Cook Islands. It was founded in 1989 and became affiliated to the International Rugby Board in 1995.

The Cook Islands Rugby Union are also members of the Pacific Islands Rugby Alliance.

== See also ==
- Cook Islands national rugby union team
- Rugby union in the Cook Islands
