= Rugby union in the Cook Islands =

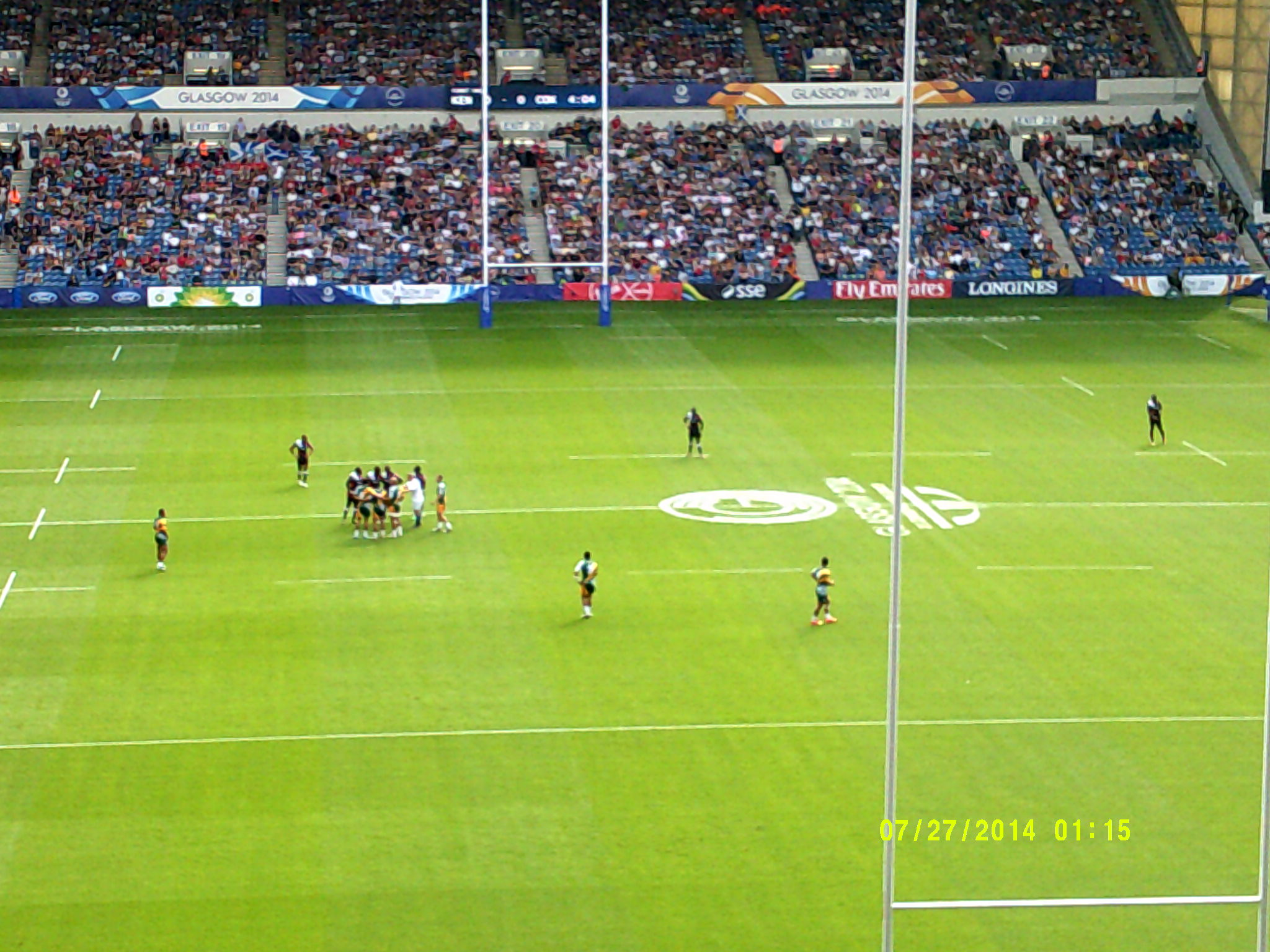
- Kenya playing the Cook Islands at the 2014 Commonwealth Games.
- Country: Cook Islands
- Governing body: Cook Islands Rugby Union
- National team: Cook Islands
- First played: Early 20th century
- Registered players: 2,258
- Clubs: 21

National competitions
- Rugby World Cup; Rugby World Cup Sevens; IRB Sevens World Series

Rugby union in the Cook Islands is a popular sport. It is a tier three rugby playing nation. They began playing international rugby in 1971 and have yet to make the Rugby World Cup. They are currently rated 55th, with 2,258 registered players and 21 clubs.

== Governing body ==
The Cook Islands Rugby Union was founded in 1948, and affiliated to the IRFB in 1995. The Cook Islands Rugby Union are also members of the Pacific Islands Rugby Alliance.

== History ==
As with many Pacific Island nations, rugby has been the main sport since the early 20th century. Visiting ships from Australia, New Zealand, the UK and Japan, have kept the game going. However, Cook Island rugby has mostly taken the form of an informal folk sport until recently. In the 1990s, Anthony Turua played a major part in formalising the situation, and getting the national side up to standard. Although they did not manage to get into the Rugby World Cup, the Cook Islands have done well in a tough rugby region, and managed to beat Papua New Guinea. As with several of the Pacific Nations, the Cook Islands have tended to do best at rugby sevens.

The Cook Islands have suffered a problem common to many other surrounding nations such as Samoa; with potential players opting to play for bigger nations. Both brothers Graeme and Steve Bachop were eligible to play for the Cook Islands but chose to play for their country of birth New Zealand.

== National team ==
The Cook Islands national rugby union team began playing international rugby union in 1971. Thus far, the Cook Islands have not made an appearance at any of the Rugby World Cups. They are very far from the level of Fiji, Samoa and Tonga. They can also supply players for the Pacific Islanders team.

== See also ==
- Cook Islands national rugby union team
- Cook Islands national rugby sevens team
- Sport in the Cook Islands
