= Invasive species in the Cook Islands =

Some invasive species have been introduced to the Cook Islands. The Global Register of Introduced and Invasive Species lists 426 invasive 'names' in the Cook Islands. The Cook Islands have 19 of the species listed in the 100 of the World's Worst Invasive Alien Species. The islands have invasive rats which cause threat to birds of the islands. Mosquitos have also been considered invasive, carrying diseases causing infenctions such as dengue fever, zika fever, and chikungunya.

== Plants ==
Invasive plants have been destroying habitat for birds and landsnails. Such birds include Rarotonga monarch, Rarotonga starling, and blue lorikeet.

Invasive plants include:

- Cardiospermum grandiflorum
- Merremia peltata
- Mikania micrantha, which has been attempted to be controlled with Puccinia spegazzinii

== Insects ==
Nine Queensland fruit flies were eradicated between 2001 and 2003.

Invasive insects in the Cook Islands include:

- Bactrocera melanotus, endemic fruit fly
- Glassy-winged sharpshooter, first discovered in Rarotonga in March 2007
- Oriental fruit fly, discovered in Rarotonga and Aitutaki in May 2013, eradicated in September 2014

=== Ants ===
Invasive ants in the Cook Islands include:

- Pheidole megacephala, first collected in Rarotonga in 1914
- Anoplolepis gracilipes, first collected in Rarotonga in 1937

=== Birds ===
Invasive birds include:

- Indian myna

=== Mammals ===
Invasive mammals include goats and pigs.
