= Kaoa =

Kaoa (Rarotongan: kāoa, literally meaning 'coral rock in the lagoon') is a term used in three atolls of the Cook Islands for small coral rocky outcrops that are the base for pearl farming. The three atolls, with their respective Kaoa areas, are:

- Penrhyn (15.0 square kilometres [5.8 sq mi])
- Manihiki (5.0 square kilometres [1.9 sq mi])
- Rakahanga (1.6 square kilometres [0.62 sq mi])
