= Avatea =

Moon god of the Cook Islands

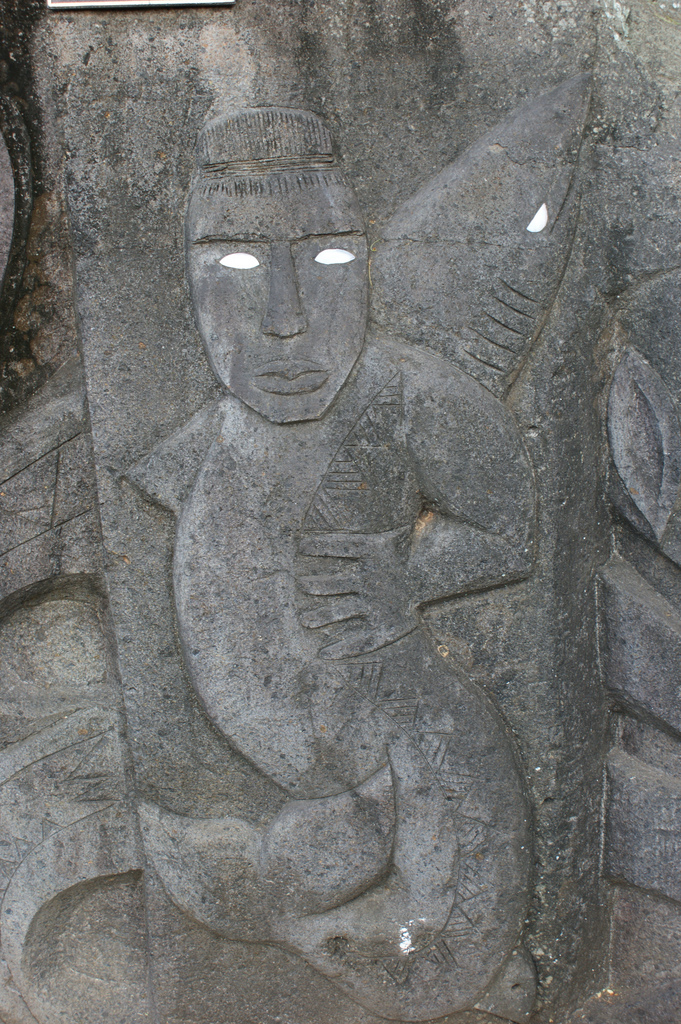
A basalt stone relief depicting Avatea in Rarotonga, Cook Islands.

In Cook Islands mythology, Avatea (also known as Vatea; meaning 'noon' or 'light') was a lunar deity and the father of gods and men in Mangaian myth of origin. His eyes were thought to be the Sun and the Moon; he was also known as the god of light.

== Mythology ==
According to one myth, Vari-Ma-Te-Takere (The primordial mother) created six children from her body. Three were plucked from her right side and three from her left. The first of which was Avatea, the first man, who was perceived as a moon god. As he grew he divided vertically into a hybrid being; the right half was a man and the left half a fish.

In song, the gods are called "children of Vatea". The same shortened phrase is in use at Rarotonga: at Aitutaki and Atiu the full form "Avatea" is used, e.g. kia kakā te mata o Avatea Nui meaning "when the eye of Great Avatea is open;" in other words "when the sun is in its full glory;" still in contrast with the darkness and gloom of Avaiki, or the Underworld.

In Mangaian myth, a beautiful woman visits Vatea in his dreams, and he is certain that she ascends from the underworld to his side, but when he wakes he can never find her. He strews scraped coconut about, and, at last, watchers see a slender hand reach for the delicious food. Vatea catches her and discovers that her name is Papa, and marries her. Tangaroa and Rongo are their twin sons. Rongo's wife bears a daughter named Tavake. Tavake gives birth to Rangi, Mokoiro, and to Akatauira. Rangi pulls up Mangaia from the underworld, and becomes the first king of the island. His wife's name is Te-po-tatango.

== See also ==
- Atea
- Wakea, a god from Hawaii
- Rangi and Papa, primordial parents in Māori tradition
- List of lunar deities
