= Islam in the Cook Islands =

Islam in the Cook Islands is a tiny religious minority in the Cook Islands, an associated state of New Zealand. The island nation's census does not calculate the number of Muslims, it is estimated that about less than 0.10% of the islands' population of about 15,000 is Muslim. One of the earliest Cook Islanders to convert to Islam was Tatiana Kautai. Islam is a small religious minority in the Cook Islands.

== History ==
In 2018, the first mosque in the Cook Islands called Masjid Fatimah Rarotonga was established in Titikaveka, on the south-east side of Rarotonga. As of November 2024, it was led by Mohammed Azam and had a congregation consisting of Cook Islanders, Indonesians, Filipinos, Fijians and Indians In February 2025, Rarotonga Muslim community spokesperson Tatiana Kautai expressed concern about rising Islamophobia in the local media, social media, the removal of the mosque pin on Google Maps and the emergence of a Cook Islands Christian Movement seeking to lobby the Cook Islands government to declare the island state a Christian country.

== See also ==
- Religion in the Cook Islands
- Islam in New Zealand
