= Demographics of the Cook Islands =

Demographic features of the population of the Cook Islands include population density, ethnicity, education level, health of the populace, economic status, religious affiliations and other aspects of the population. A census is carried out every five years. The last one was in 2021 and the next will be in 2026.

== Population ==
Historical population

Year	Pop.	±% p.a.
1902	8,213	—
1906	8,518	+0.92%
1911	8,655	+0.32%
1916	8,805	+0.34%
1921	9,459	+1.44%
1926	10,082	+1.28%
1936	12,246	+1.96%

Year	Pop.	±% p.a.
1945	14,088	+1.57%
1951	15,079	+1.14%
1961	18,378	+2.00%
1966	19,247	+0.93%
1971	21,322	+2.07%
1976	18,126	−3.20%
1981	17,743	−0.43%

Year	Pop.	±% p.a.
1986	17,614	−0.15%
1996	19,103	+0.81%
2001	18,027	−1.15%
2006	19,342	+1.42%
2011	17,794	−1.65%
2016	17,434	−0.41%
2021	15,040	−2.91%

== Structure of the population ==
Population pyramid 2011
%	Males	Age	Females	%
0.5		80+		0.6
0.7		75–79		0.9
1.4		70–74		1.4
1.9		65–69		1.8
2.2		60–64		2.0
2.4		55–59		2.4
3.0		50–54		3.0
3.6		45–49		3.6
3.4		40–44		3.6
3.1		35–39		3.6
3.0		30–34		3.3
3.3		25–29		3.8
3.4		20–24		3.7
4.3		15–19		4.1
4.5		10–14		4.0
4.3		5–9		4.3
4.5		0–4		4.4
- Source: unstats.un.org

Population by sex and age group (census 1 December 2016)

Age group	Male	Female	Total	%
Total	8,520	8,914	17,434	100
0–4	710	644	1,354	7.77
5–9	768	733	1,501	8.61
10–14	745	696	1,441	8.27
15–19	664	711	1,375	7.89
20–24	569	656	1,225	7.03
25–29	541	612	1,153	6.61
30–34	482	595	1,077	6.18
35–39	483	533	1,016	5.83
40–44	520	601	1,121	6.43
45–49	599	625	1,224	7.02
50–54	642	623	1,265	7.26
55–59	521	522	1,043	5.98
60–64	405	429	834	4.78
65–69	363	333	696	3.99
70–74	234	248	482	2.76
75–79	159	194	353	2.02
80+	115	159	274	1.57
Age group	Male	Female	Total	Percent
0–14	2,223	2,073	4,296	24.64
15–64	5,426	5,907	11,333	65.01
65+	871	934	1,805	10.35

== Vital statistics ==
Births and deaths
Year	Population	Live births	Deaths	Natural increase	Crude birth rate	Crude death rate	Rate of natural increase	Total fertility rate
2001	18,027	315	88	227	21.0			2.9
2002		279	97	182				
2003		294	92	202				
2004	15,169	297	99	198				
2005		275	91	184				
2006	19,342	279	85	194	19.1	6.5	12.6	2.5
2007		296	84	212				
2008		261	56	205				
2009		255	67	188	12.6	3.2	9.4	
2010		286	92	194	12.1	3.9	8.2	
2011	19,300	262	72	190	17.8	4.9	12.9	2.6
2012	19,500	259	104	155	18.1	7.3	10.8	
2013	18,600	256	115	141	18.2	8.2	10.0	
2014	18,600	204	113	91	15.0	8.3	6.7	
2015	18,400	205	102	103	15.5	7.7	7.8	
2016	19,300	242	87	155	20.5	7.4	13.1	2.5
2017	19,500	222	93	129	14.2	6.0	8.3	
2018	20,200	232	121	111	14.6	7.6	7.0	
2019	20,200	225	105	120	13.1	6.1	7.0	
2020	16,500	248	125	123	13.9	7.0	6.9	
2021	18,200	202	122	80	11.6	7.0	4.6	
2022	20,500	233	117	116	13.2	6.6	6.6	
2023	21,600	212	165	47	12.6	9.8	2.8	
2024	24,500	201	132	69	11.6	7.6	4.0	

== Ethnic groups ==
The indigenous Polynesian people of the Cook Islands are known as Cook Islands Māori. These include speakers of the Cook Islands Māori language, closely related to Tahitian and New Zealand Māori, who form the majority of the population and inhabit the southern islands, including Rarotonga, and also the people of Pukapuka, whose language is more closely related to Samoan. Cook Islanders of non-indigenous descent include other Pacific Island peoples, Papa'a (Europeans), and those of Asian descent.

Religion (CIA World Factbook)
1. Reformed Church (Cook Islands Christian Church) (49.1%)
2. Adventism (Seventh-day Adventist Church) (7.9%)
3. Pentecostalism (Assemblies of God, Apostolic Church) (5.8%)
4. Catholicism (17.0%)
5. Mormonism (4.4%)
6. Other (8.0%)
7. No religion (5.6%)
8. No response (2.2%)

Ethnic group	Population		Percent of total	Change 2006–2016
Ethnic group	2006	2016	Percent of total	Change 2006–2016
Cook Islands Māori	14,938	11,575	78.2	▼
Part Cook Islands Māori	1,045	1,128	7.6	▲
Other	1,349	2,099	14.2	▲
Total	17,332	14,802	100.0	▼

== Languages ==
- English (official) 86.4%
- Cook Islands Maori (Rarotongan) (official) 76.2%
- Other 8.3%

== Religion ==
The Cook Islands are majority-Protestant, with almost half the population being members of the Reformed Cook Islands Christian Church. Other Protestant denominations include Seventh-day Adventists, Assemblies of God and the Apostolic Church (the latter two being Pentecostal denominations). The largest non-Protestant denomination are Roman Catholics, followed by the Church of Jesus Christ of Latter-day Saints. Non-Christian faiths, including Hinduism, Buddhism and Islam, have small followings, primarily of non-indigenous residents.
