= Papa (mythology) =

Earth mother in Māori mythology

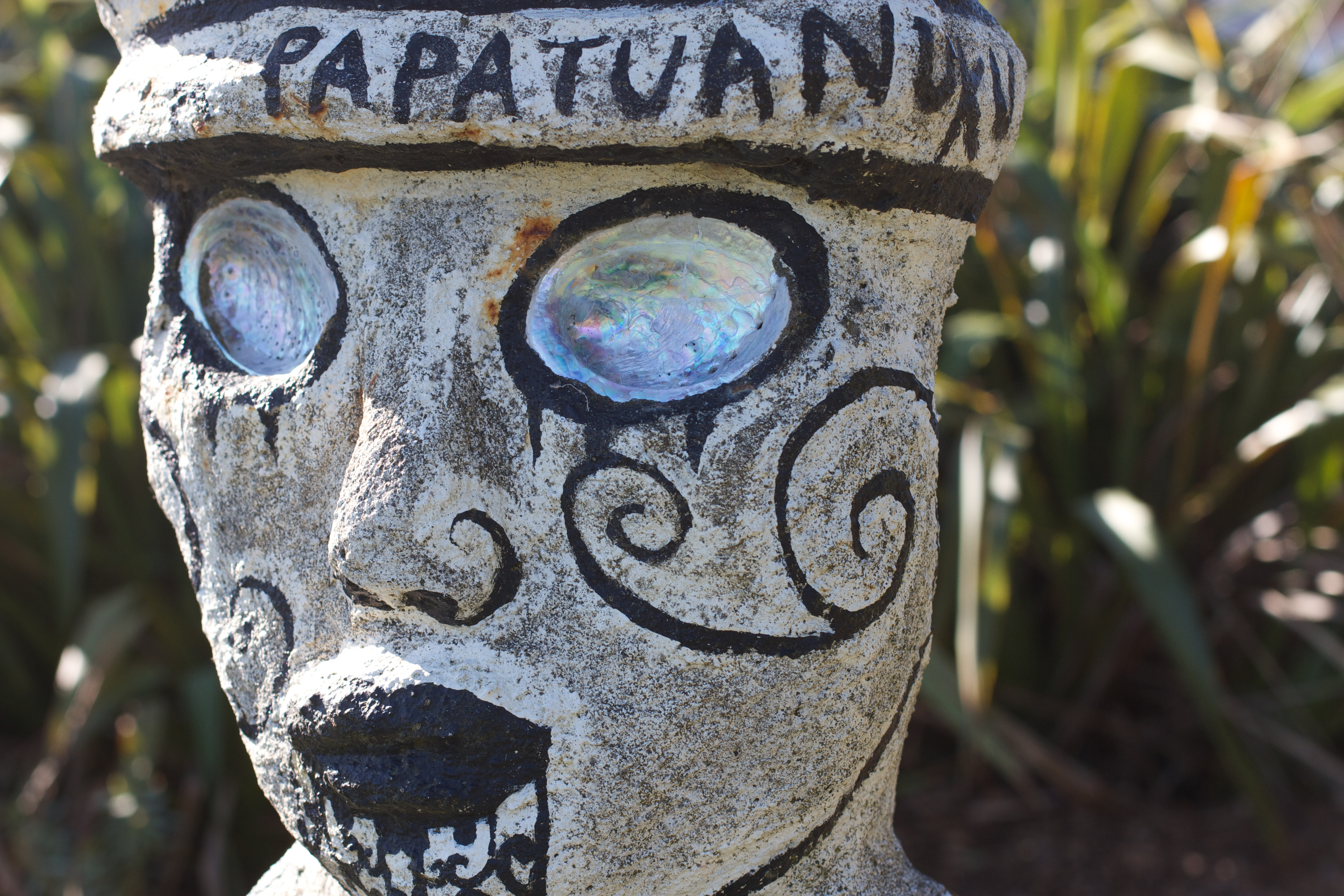
Papatuanuku statue

In the Cook Islands mythology of the southern Cook Islands group, the earth goddess Papa was created when Varima-te-takere, the primordial mother goddess, plucked her out from the left side of her body. Papa married her brother, the sky god Vatea. They had twin sons, the sea god Tangaroa and the vegetation god Rongo.

== See also ==
- Rangi and Papa, in Māori mythology
- Papahānaumoku, Earth goddess in Hawaiian mythology
