= Vaitakere =

In Cook Islands mythology, Vaitakere is the father-in-law of Tangaroa. He discovered breadfruit in the mountains and his wife discovered the chestnut.

== See also ==
- Polynesian mythology
