= Sport in the Cook Islands =

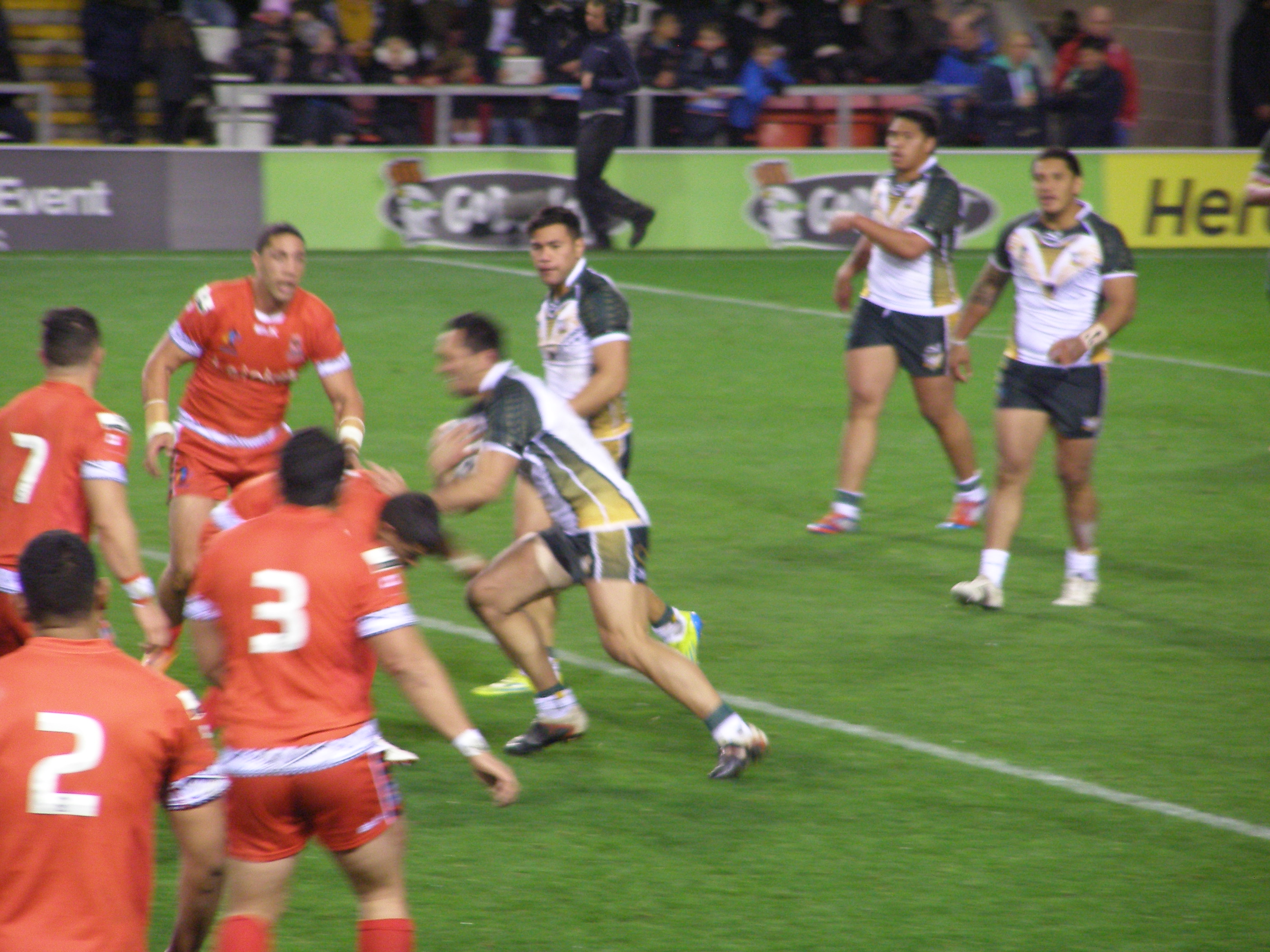
Tonga vs the Cook Islands at the 2013 Rugby League World Cup

Rugby league is the national sport and most popular sport in the Cook Islands, with soccer and rugby union as the next most popular/played sports. In September 2009, the Cook Islands hosted the 2009 Pacific Mini Games. Cook Islands Sports National Olympic Committee is the official governing body of sport in the Cook Islands.

== Types of football ==
=== Rugby league ===
Rugby league is the national sport and the most popular sport in the Cook Islands. The Cook Islands were introduced to rugby league in 1988, when the Cook Islands national rugby league team played their first match against the New Zealand Maori team. In the mid-1990s, rugby league in the Cook Islands received significant funding through the SuperLeague organisation; however, money from this source is no longer available.

The greatest event in the history of Cook Islands rugby league – and probably Cook Islands sport more generally – was the victory in the 1995 Emerging Nations Rugby League World Cup, held in the United Kingdom. Cook Islands emerged victorious 22–6 over Ireland in the Final held at Gigg Lane, Bury, on 24 October 1995.

In more recent times, the Cook Islands national rugby league team has received a major boost through the involvement of former professional rugby league players Kevin Iro and Matt Rua (both native Cook Islanders), in the form of selector and defensive coach for the national side. Both players represented New Zealand internationally and played many National Rugby League games. Rugby league also receives much time on television in the Cook Islands, with four NRL games shown per week, fuelling the popularity of the sport amongst the islanders.

The Cook Islands national rugby league team made their senior World Cup debut in 2000 and played in their second world cup in the 2013 Rugby League World Cup. They competed again in the 2021 Rugby League World Cup in England where they recorded one win from three matches.

=== Rugby union ===
The Cook Islands is a tier-three rugby union playing nation. They began playing international rugby union in the early 1990s, and have yet to make the Rugby World Cup.

The Cook Islands Rugby Union is the governing body for rugby union in the Cook Islands. It was founded in 1989, and became affiliated to the International Rugby Board in 1995.

=== Association football (soccer) ===
The Cook Islands Football Association is the governing body of football in the Cook Islands. The Cook Islands Round Cup is the top division in the Cook Islands, and the Cook Islands Cup is the top knock-out tournament.

=== Footballers of Cook Islands descent ===
The following list includes players of various codes of football. These include:

- Pekahou Cowan
- Robbie Fruean
- Carl Hoeft
- Tafai Ioasa
- James Kamana
- Johnny Leota
- Aaron Mauger
- Nathan Mauger
- Craig McGrath
- Ryan Nicholas
- Valentine Holmes
- Esan Marsters
- Rene Ranger
- Stephen Setephano
- Teddy Stanaway
- Lima Sopoaga
- Stan Wright

== Cricket ==
Cricket is played on Rarotonga, and some of the outer islands (where the rules are often similar to the sport of Samoan cricket or kirikiti). Most villages have teams, which compete in a league after the end of the soccer season. It is popular among the older generation.

The men's and women's national teams play in ICC East Asia-Pacific tournaments.

== Netball ==
Women's netball is a very popular sport in the Cook Islands, and the country has one of the world's top 10 teams, which competed in the 2007 Netball World Cup.

== See also ==
- Sport in Oceania
- Cook Islands at the Olympics
