= Transport in the Cook Islands =

Transport in the Cook Islands consists of air and maritime transport between the islands, and road transport on each island. The Cook Islands have a long history of maritime transport.

== Air transport ==
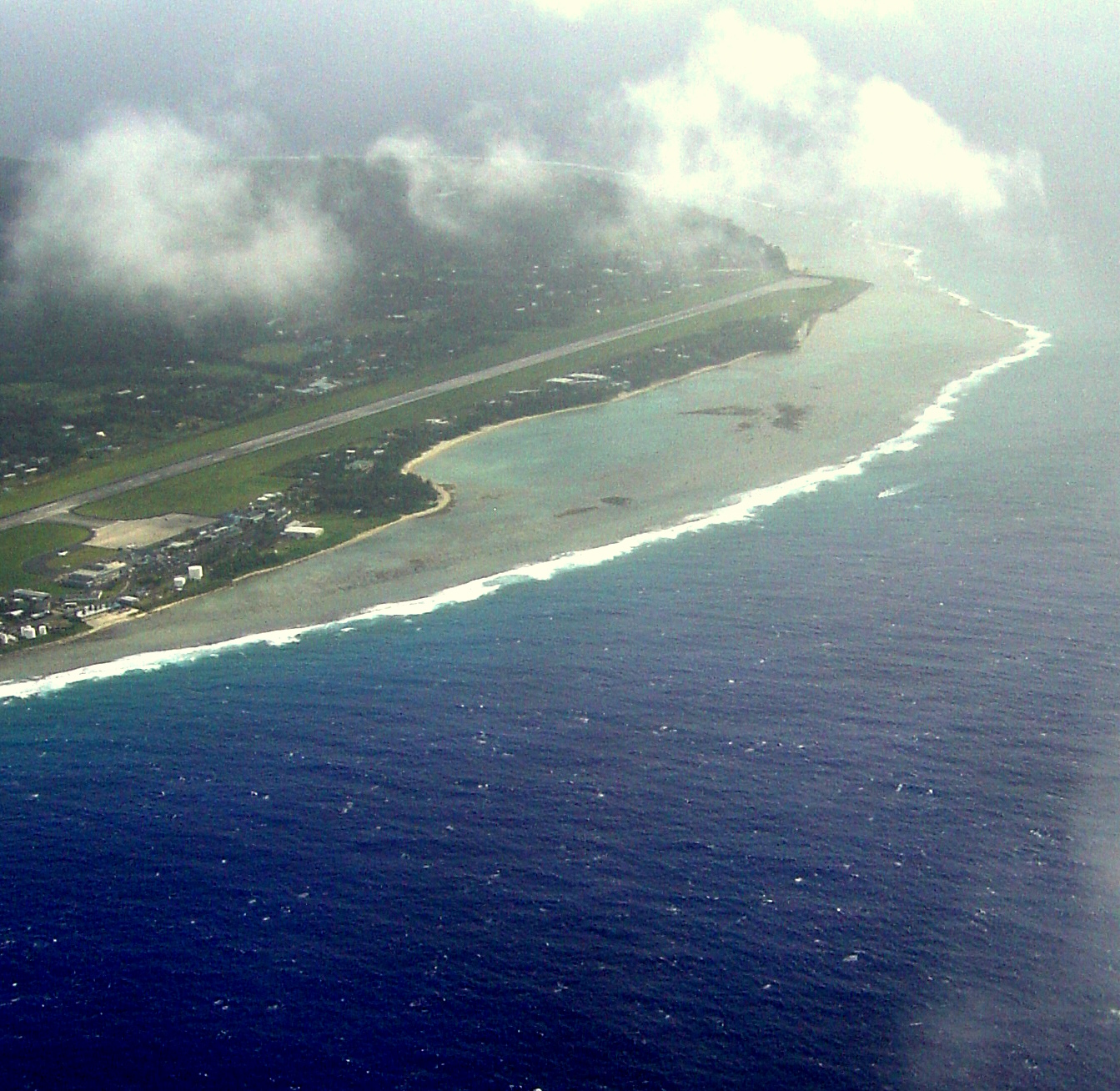
Rarotonga Airport from the air

One airline, Air Rarotonga, is based in the country. It flies domestically and to Tahiti in French Polynesia. Several foreign airlines also provide international service.

There is one international airport, Rarotonga International Airport. Eight airports on other islands provide local or charter services. Only Rarotonga and Aitutaki Airport have paved runways; the others have coral runways.

== Maritime transport ==
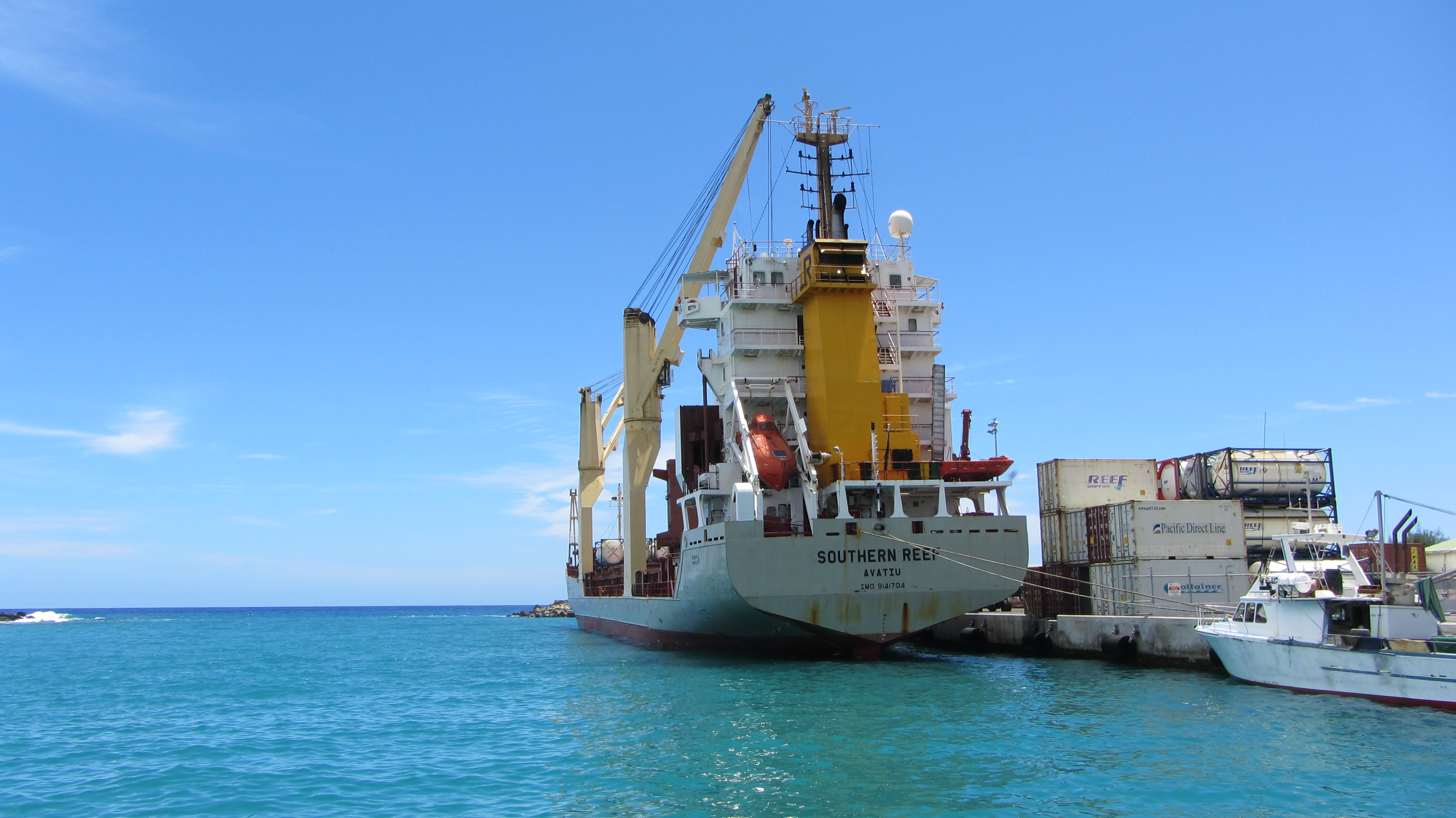
Avatiu Harbour, Rarotonga

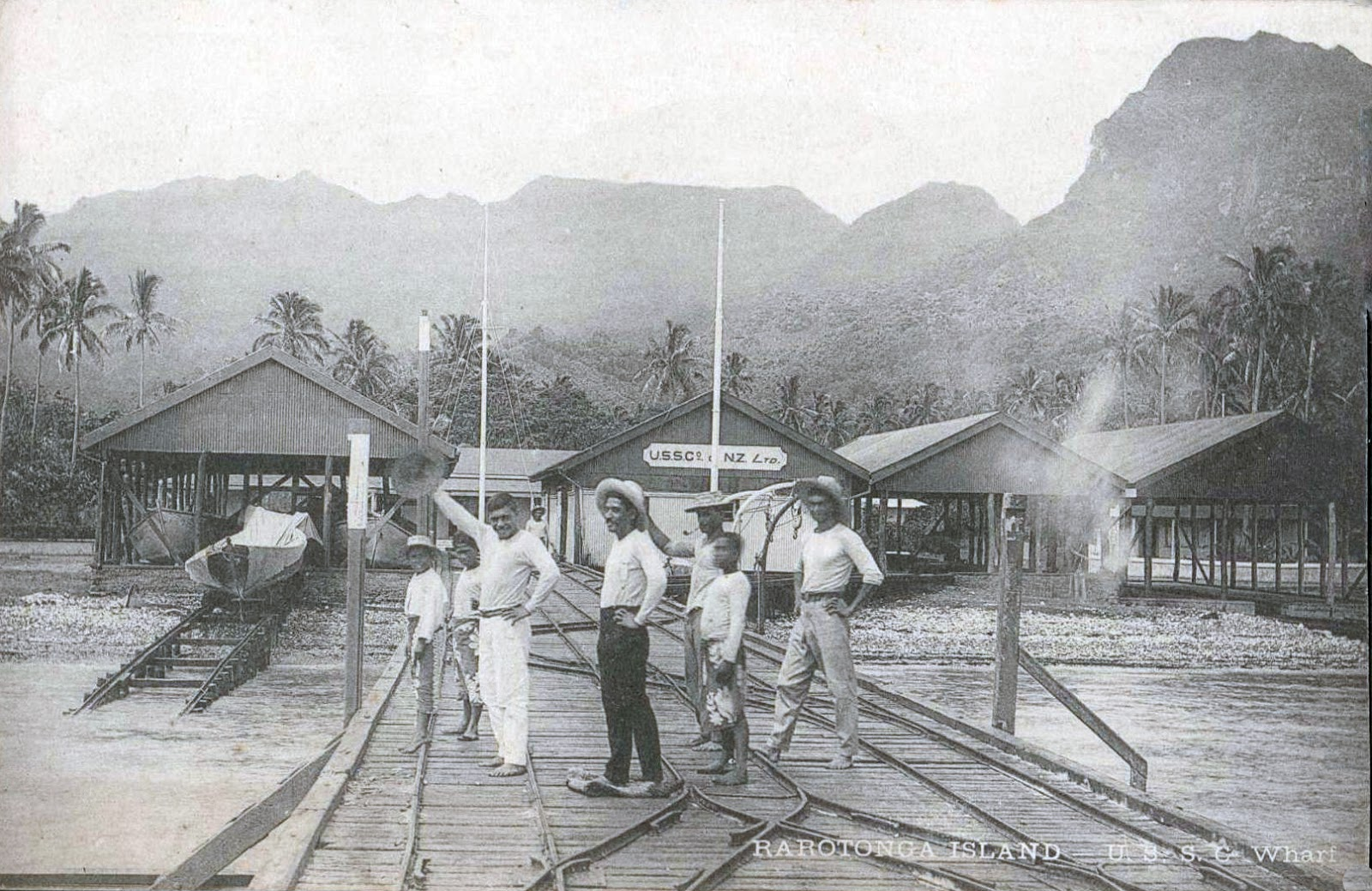
Avarua Harbour, Rarotonga

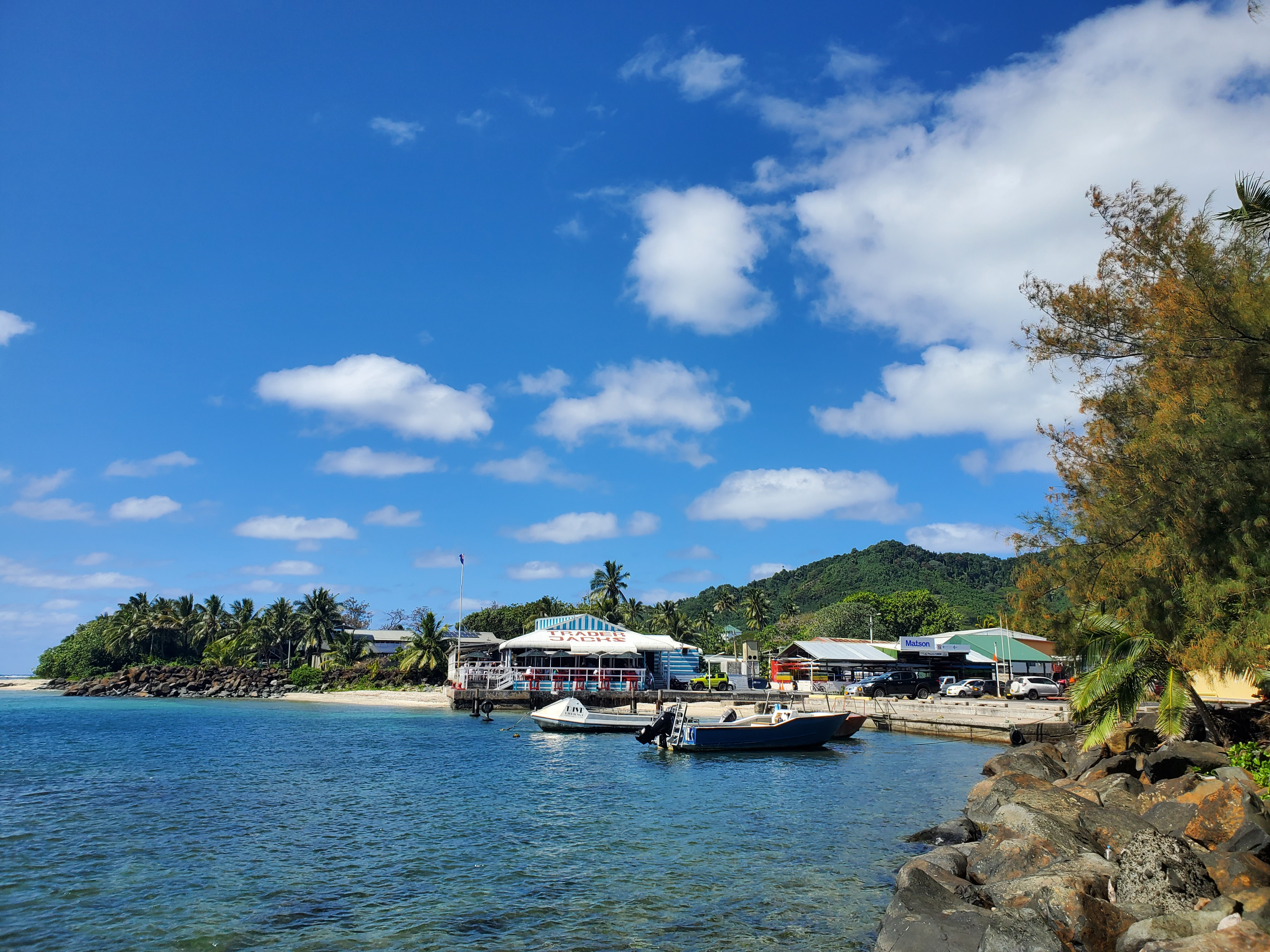
Avarua Harbour, Rarotonga, 2025

The Cook Islands have a long history of sea transport. The islands were colonised from Tahiti, and in turn colonised New Zealand in ocean-going waka. In the late nineteenth century, following European contact, the islands had a significant fleet of schooners, which they used to travel between islands and to trade with Tahiti and New Zealand. In 1899, locally owned shipping carried 10% of all international trade to the islands, and 66% of all trade carried by sail. Indigenous-owned shipping was driven out of business after the islands became a territory of New Zealand, replaced by government-owned vessels, New Zealand trading companies, and the steamships of the Union Steamship Company.

International shipping is provided by Pacific Forum Line and Matson, Inc. (as EXCIL shipping). There are two inter-island shipping companies: Taio Shipping, operating two vessels, and Cook Islands Towage, operating one. Container ships can berth only at Rarotonga's port of Avatiu, which was redeveloped in 2013. At the port of Arutanga at Aitutaki, ships anchor outside the reef and cargo is carried to the dock by lighter barge. The barge can carry two 20-foot containers at a time. The smaller islands have passages through their reefs, but these are not suitable for large vessels. Avarua harbour at Rarotonga was a significant port until Avatiu was developed as the major port in the 1980s.

In the past, shipping interruptions have led to shortages of imported goods and fuel, and electricity blackouts on the outer islands. Shipping has frequently been subsidised to ensure service. In 2019 the Cook Islands government announced that it would acquire a dedicated cargo ship for the outer islands after Cook Islands Towage's barge was sold. It subsequently delayed the purchase pending the development of a Cook Islands Shipping Roadmap, and issued a tender for a Pa Enua Shipping Charter.

The Cook Islands operates an open ship registry and has been placed on the Paris Memorandum of Understanding on Port State Control Black List as a flag of convenience. Ships registered in the Cook Islands have been used to smuggle oil from Iran in defiance of international sanctions. In February 2021 two ships were removed from the shipping register for concealing their movements by turning their automatic identification system off. In April 2022 the motoryacht Tango owned by sanctioned Russian oligarch Viktor Vekselberg was seized in Spain. Maritime Cook Islands claimed that no other sanctioned vessels were on its registry. In July 2022 two yachts owned by sanctioned oligarch Roman Abramovich were reflagged as Cook Islands vessels, allowing them to escape arrest in Antigua and Barbuda.

In 2024 Maritime Cook Islands deflagged 12 tankers for violating sanctions against Russia and Iran. It denied that it had become a haven for Russia's "dark fleet" of sanctions-evaders.

=== Merchant marine ===
- total: 205
- by type: bulk carrier 21, container ship 3, general cargo 85, oil tanker 33, other 63 (2019)
- country comparison to the world: 65

== Road transport ==
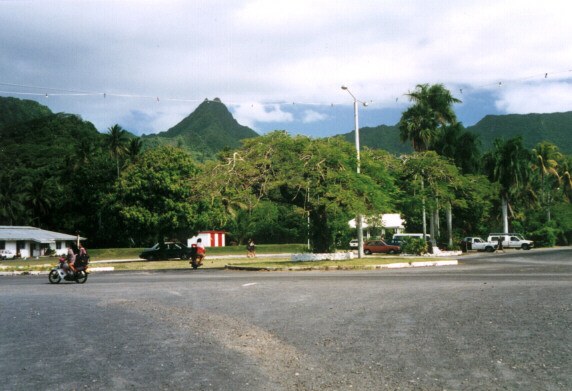
Avarua Roundabout, one of only two on Rarotonga

Traffic drives on the left side of the road. The maximum speed limit is 50 km/h, with a limit of 30 km/h in some areas. On the main island of Rarotonga, there are no traffic lights and just two roundabouts. Buses operate clockwise and anti-clockwise services around the island's coastal ring-road.

Road safety is poor. In 2011, the Cook Islands had the second-highest per-capita road deaths in the world. In 2018, crashes neared a record high, with speeding, alcohol and careless behaviour being the main causes. Motor scooters are a common form of transport, but there was no requirement for helmets, making them a common cause of death and injuries. Legislation requiring helmets was passed in 2007, but scrapped in early 2008 before it came into force. In 2016, a law was passed requiring visitors and riders aged 16 to 25 to wear helmets, but it was widely flouted. In March 2020 the Cook Islands parliament again legislated for compulsory helmets to be worn from June 26, but implementation was delayed until July 31, and then until September 30.

Highways

- Total: 295 km (2018)
- Paved: 207 km (2018)
- Unpaved: 88 km (2018)

== Rail transport ==
The Cook Islands has no effective rail transport. Rarotonga had a 170-metre tourist railway on private property, the Rarotonga Steam Railway, but it is no longer in working condition.
