= Nganaoa =

In Cook Islands mythology (Aitutaki), Nganaoa is a hero who sighted and killed unusually large animals in the ocean while sailing with Rata.

== Family ==
Nganaoa is the son of Vaiaroa and Tairi-tokerau. He discovered his parents on an island, sitting next to a sennit.

== Boat request ==
Rata retrieved a canoe with his grandmother. He requested to enter the boat, claiming that he was excellent at flying kites. However, it did not please Rata, and Nganaoa was thrown overboard. However, Rata changed his mind and let him on the boat.

== Monsters ==
Nganaoa sighted a large clam and shouted to Rata "O Rata! A fearful enemy is rising up from the sea!". Nganaoa was prepared and threw a spear into the clams stomach. After killing the clam, he claimed he saw another one.

Along the way, he discovered giant octopuses and whales. He attempted to kill a whale with his spear, but it broke into half. Before he was almost smashed by the whale, he cut him in half with both pieces of his spear.
