= Marama (mythology) =

Polynesian deity

Marama is a Polynesian deity of varying representation and importance depending on the society or tribe being discussed.

To the Maori people, Marama is the moon, a male deity who married Hina, the daughter of Tangaroa. However, the moon is also considered to be the husband of all women due to the effect of the moon on women every month. In the Gambier Islands, Marama is also considered to be the moon, however in Samoa and Tahiti, Marama is considered to be the deity of Light, highlighting how different mythology can be, especially across the vast expanse of Oceania. In Samoa, Marama is also considered to be the founder and patron of woodworkers and carpenters.

The Opunohu Valley has 3 Tahitian occupation phases, Atiro'o (7-1650), Marama (1650-1788), and Pomare (1788-1843). The Marama phase is named after the Marama family whom conquered the Atiro'o and divided the valley into Amehiti and Tupaururu, then made new settlements in Tupaururu.

== Genealogy ==
Little is known about Marama, many mentions of him are only to explain the genealogy of other more prominent gods of the time. The genealogy is as follows: First there is the Supreme Being, Io, from Io comes Marama and from Marama is Po. Finally, from Po, is Rangi and Papa, Heaven Father and Earth Mother, from which all other gods were descended.

== See also ==
- List of lunar deities
- Mythology of Oceania
