= Ngamaru Rongotini Ariki =

- High Chief of Atiu, Prince Consort of the Kingdom of Rarotonga
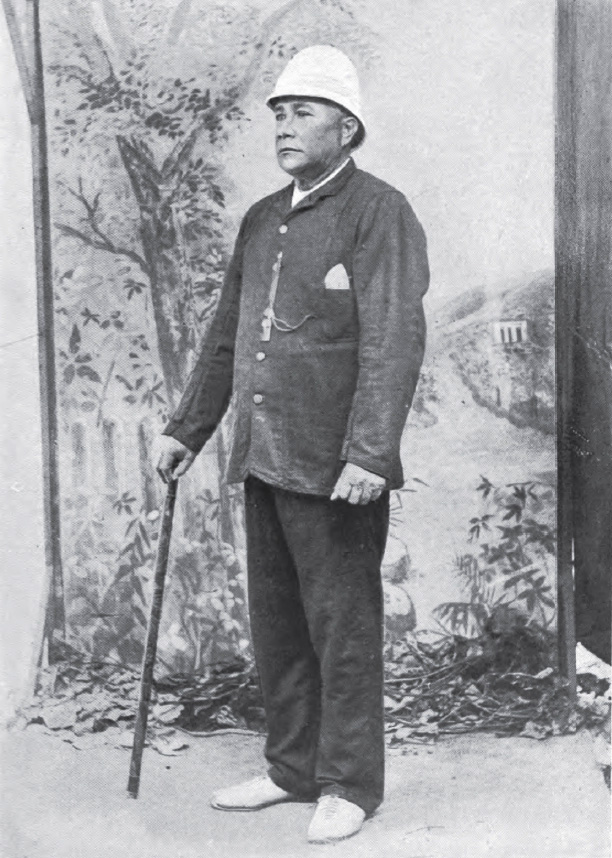
- Prince Ngamaru during Auckland visit (1885)
- Born: circa 1831; Areora, Atiu
- Died: 31 March 1903 (aged 72); Avarua, Rarotonga
- Spouse: Makea Takau Ariki
- House: House of Te Akatuira
- Dynasty: Ngamaru Dynasty

Ngamaru Rongotini Ariki (c. 1831 – 31 March 1903) was a sovereign of the Cook Islands. He was the ariki of the Ngamaru dynasty on the island of Atiu, one of the chiefdoms of Ngaputoru, which consisted of three adjoining islands —Atiu, Mitiaro, and Mauke. In the 1860s he married Makea Takau, a princess of Rarotonga. In 1871 Makea Takau became ariki of Rarotonga and queen regnant of the Kingdom of Rarotonga, as a consequence making Ngamaru prince consort of the realm of the united Cook Islands.

He was Representative of Atiu, Mitiaro and Mauke in the Federal Council and also a native Judge of the Ariki's Court at Avarua. Ngamaru was also a commercial power to his people, being an inter-island trader with a schooner of his own.

Prince Ngamaru died of blood poisoning after an injury to his hand, he was 72 years of age. He was buried in Queen Makea's private graveyard at Para O Tane Palace.

== See also ==
- History of the Cook Islands
- House of Ariki
