= Irene Tupuna =

Cook Islander lawn bowler

Personal information
- Born: 18 September 1959 (age 66) Kimiangatau, Mauke, Cook Islands

Sport
- Sport: Lawn bowls
Medal record
Representing Cook Islands
Asia Pacific Bowls Championships
Bronze medal – third place	2007 Christchurch	triples

Irene Tupuna (born 18 September 1959), also known as Matangaro Tupuna, is an international lawn bowler from the Cook Islands.

== Bows career ==
Tupuna won the bronze medal in the triples at the 2007 Asia Pacific Bowls Championships in Christchurch.

She has been selected to represent the Cook Islands at two Commonwealth Games; the singles at the 2010 Commonwealth Games and the triples and fours at the 2014 Commonwealth Games.
