= Cook Islands Federation =

British colony (1891–1901)

Coordinates: 21°12′S 159°46′W

- 1891–1901
- Flag Emblem
- Anthem: God Save the Queen
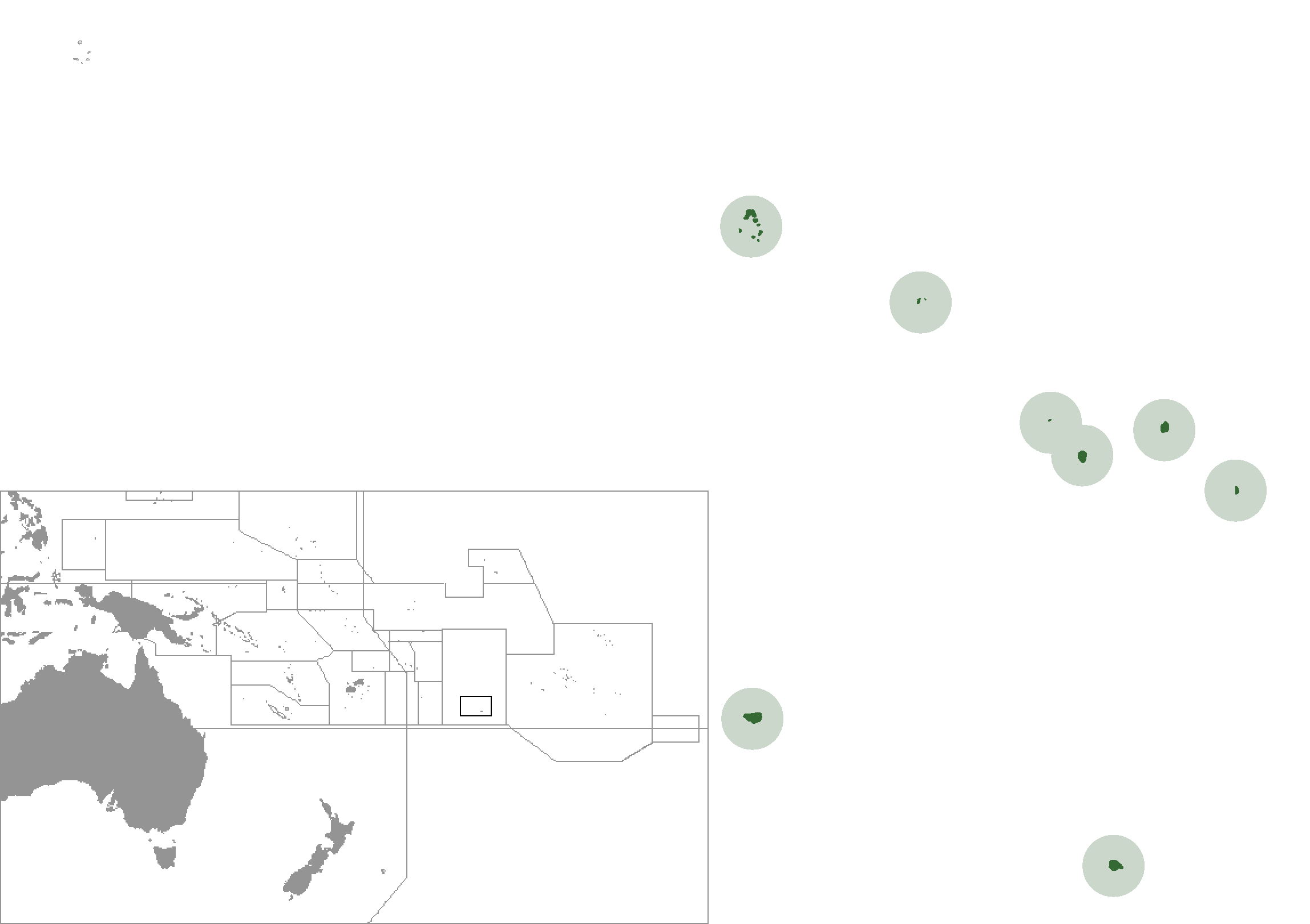
- Status: British colony
- Capital: Avarua (presumed)
- Historical era: New Imperialism
  - Established: 1891
  - Disestablished: 1901
- ISO 3166 code: CK
Preceded by	Succeeded by
Kingdom of Rarotonga	Cook Islands

The Cook Islands Federation was created in 1891, after the Kingdom of Rarotonga was given the island of Aitutaki. It lasted until 1901, when it was given to New Zealand.

== Geography ==
The Cook Islands Federation was made up of the islands of the southern group of the Cook Islands - Rarotonga, Mangaia, and Aitutaki - and the Nga-Pu-Toru - Atiu, Mauke, and Mitiaro.

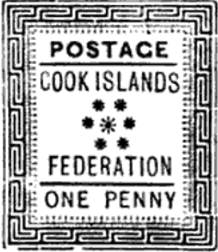
A stamp issued by the Cook Islands Federation

== Law ==
The laws of the Cook Islands Federation were made by the local parliament, however, they had to receive approval from a Resident from Britain. In 1894, the Parliament pronounced a declaration on land, detailing Māori custom on land tenure, and stating that those customs could only be changed by each island's respective council.

In 1899, the Parliament of Cook Islands ruled that the high court of the Cook Islands Federation could not give any punishment worse than those outlined by the Criminal Code Act of 1893, and The Summary Jurisdiction Act of 1894, which were both laws of New Zealand, and that both acts of New Zealand were to be adopted entirely.

=== Penal colonies ===
In 1892, the island of Takutea was set up as a penal colony, but in 1899 its use ceased, and the island of Manuae was used instead.

== See also ==
- History of the Cook Islands
