= Tararo Jane Ariki =

Tararo Jane Ariki II

Tararo Ariki of Mauke
- In office 1934–1982
- Preceded by: Tararo Jane Ariki I
- Succeeded by: Tararo Tapoki-Kiri I

Member of the Legislative Council
- In office 1947–1948, 1951
- Constituency: Mauke

Member of the House of Ariki

Personal details
- Born: 26 May 1910; Mauke, Cook Islands
- Died: 23 December 1982

Tararo Jane Ariki II (26 May 1910 – 23 December 1982) was a Cook Islands chiefess and politician. An ariki of Mauke island, she was also the first woman to become a member of the islands' Legislative Council.

== Biography ==
Tararo was born in 1910 in Mauke. She became the Tararo ariki of Mauke in 1934, succeeding her mother. She married George Cowan, and the couple had a daughter Hilda who was born in 1937 but died the following year. During the 1930s she formed a dance group consisting of family members and other people from Oiretumu village.

The first indirect elections were held for the Legislative Council in 1947, in which members were elected by island councils. A member of Mauke Island Council, Tararo was elected as the island's representative, becoming the only women in the Legislative Council. She served until the following year, and again in 1951. Following its creation, she became a member of the House of Ariki. She also served on the General Assembly of the Cook Islands Christian Church and worked as an adviser on Maori customs, choreographer and costume designer.

In 1977 she was awarded the Queen Elizabeth II Silver Jubilee Medal and appointed Commissioner of the Cook Islands Judiciary. Construction work began on a palace for her in 1982, but was abandoned due to political disputes within the Tararo group.
