= Makea (disambiguation) =

Makea is the Basque spelling of Macaye. Makea may also refer to:

== People ==
- Makea Pori Ariki (died 1839), sovereign of the Cook Islands
- Makea Takau Ariki (c. 1839–1911), sovereign of the Cook Islands
- Makea Te Vaerua Ariki (died 1857), sovereign of the Cook Islands
- Margaret Makea Karika Ariki (1919–2017), Cook Islands royal

== Other uses ==
- Makea-Tutara, Māori god
