= Makatea (district) =

District of Mauke in the Cook Islands

Coordinates: 20°9′20.29″S 157°21′4.16″W

Districts of Mauke

Makatea is one of four traditional districts on the island of Mauke in the Cook Islands. It is in the west of the island, between the districts of Areora and Ngatiarua.
