= 2016 Cook Islands census =

Census of the Cook Islands

Cook Islands 2016 Census
- 1 December 2016; 9 years ago

General information
- Country: Cook Islands

Results
- Total population: 17,434 (▼2.06%)
- Most populous Island: Rarotonga (13,007)
- Least populous Island: Palmerston (58)

The 2016 Cook Islands Census took place on December 1, 2016. The population of the Cook Islands was counted as 17,434 – a decrease of 360 (2.06%) from the 2011 census.

== Results ==
=== Population and dwellings ===
Population counts for the inhabited Islands of the Cook Islands. All figures are for the total population count. The resident population count was 14,802.

Island	Population	%
Rarotonga	13,007	74.61
Aitutaki	1,941	11.13
Mangaia	499	2.86
Atiu	434	2.49
Mauke	297	1.7
Mitiaro	155	0.89
Southern Islands	3,326	19.08
Pukapuka	444	2.55
Penrhyn	226	1.3
Manihiki	212	1.22
Rakahanga	83	0.48
Nassau	78	0.45
Palmerston	58	0.33
Northern Islands	1,101	6.32
Cook Islands	17,434	100

- Total population count was 17,434, down 360 from the 2011 Census.
  - There are 8,520 males in the Cook Islands (48.87% of the population) and 8,914 females (51.13% of the population).

=== Ethnicity ===
The largest ethnic groups in 2016 were 78.2% Cook Islands Māori, 7.6% part Cook Islands Māori, and 14.2% other ethnic groups.

Data is for the census usually-resident population count.

Ethnic group	Population	%
Cook Islands Māori	11,575	78.2
Part Cook Islands Māori	1,128	7.62
Other	2,099	14.18
Total	14,802	100

=== Religion ===
The largest religion in the Cook Islands is the Cook Islands Christian Church with 48.8% of the population identifying with that religion in 2016. Data is for the census usually-resident population count.

Religious affiliation	Population	%
Christian	12,866	86.92
Cook Islands Christian Church	7,225	48.81
Roman Catholic	2,574	17.39
Seventh-day Adventist	1,249	8.44
Church of Jesus Christ of Latter-day Saints	609	4.11
Assemblies of God	569	3.84
Jehovah's Witness	357	2.41
Apostolic	283	1.91
Irreligion/Not Stated	1,097	7.41
Other	839	5.67
Total	14,802	100
