= 1947 Cook Islands Legislative Council election =

Legislative Council elections were held in the Cook Islands in 1947, the first after the establishment of the new legislature.

== Background ==
The Cook Islands Legislative Council was formed following legislation passed in October 1946, and consisted of ten members indirectly elected by island councils (four from Rarotonga and six from smaller islands), ten civil servants appointed by the Governor-General of New Zealand and the Resident Commissioner, who was president of the council. The island councils were made partially elective, and the elected members of the councils were eligible to be candidates for election to the Legislative Council. It was intended that the elected European member of Rarotonga Island Council would automatically become the European member of the Legislative Council. However, the legislation published required the European member to be elected by indigenous members of the Island Council.

The island council elections took place in March. In Rarotonga there was a contested election for the European seat (which Europeans living anywhere in the Cook Islands could vote for) for the first time in several years; incumbent member Willie Watson defeated Stuart Kingan by 47 votes to 37, with all but two registered voters casting ballots.

== Results ==
The elected members included one woman, Tararo Jane Ariki, ariki of Mauke island.

Island	Elected members
Aitutaki	Norman Mitchell
Atiu	Rangematane Maka Kea Ariki
Mangaia	Mateke John Trego Ariki
Manihiki	Tihau Nabala
Mauke	Tararo Jane Ariki
Penrhyn	Akatapuria
Rarotonga	Makea George Pa Karika Ariki
Rarotonga	Piri Tekamu Maoate
Rarotonga	Ua Turua
Rarotonga	Willie Watson
Source: Pacific Islands Monthly

The official members included the Acting Resident Agent of Aitutaki, the Chief Medical Officer, the Director of Agriculture, the Education Officer, the Resident Agents of Atiu, Mangaia, Mauke, Penrhyn and Rakahanga, and the Treasurer.

== Aftermath ==
The newly elected Council met for the first time on 5 November 1947.
