= Vaimutu =

Coordinates: 20°9′32.12″S 157°19′51.45″W

Districts of Mauke

Vaimutu is one of four traditional districts on the island of Mauke in the Cook Islands. It is in the east of the island, between the districts of Ngatiarua and Areora.
