= Anuanua Moana =

Research vessel

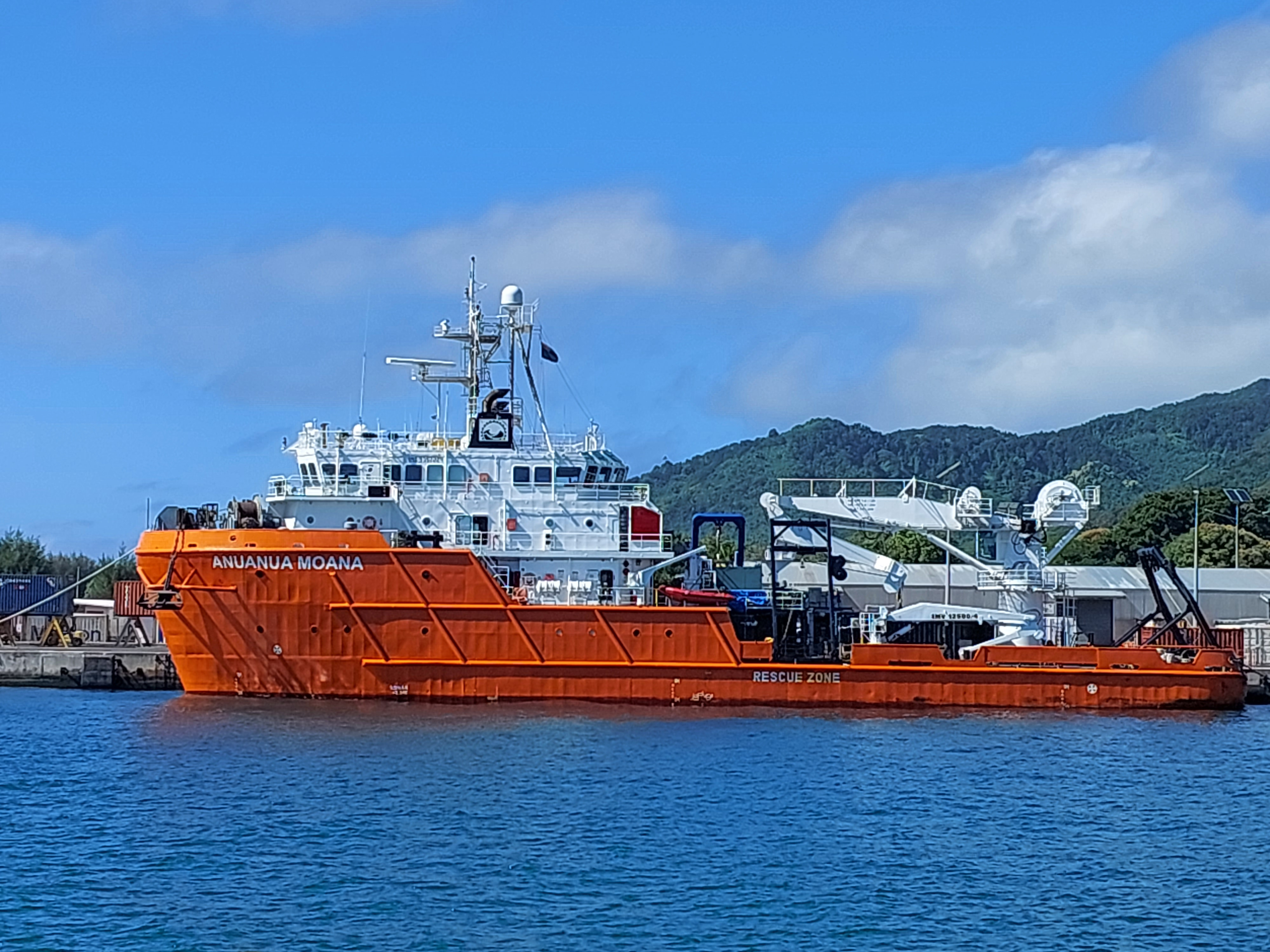
- Anuanua Moana in July 2023

History

Cook Islands
- Name: Anuanua Moana
- Builder: ABG Shipyard Surat
- Completed: 2007
- Renamed: 2023
- Home port: Avatiu, Cook Islands
- Identification: IMO number: 9352224; MMSI number: 518998507; Callsign: E5U4487
- Status: In service

General characteristics
- Displacement: 2163
- Length: 61 m (200 ft)
- Beam: 15.8 m (52 ft)
- Complement: 19

Anuanua Moana ("Rainbow of the Sea") is a research vessel registered in the Cook Islands. It is operated by Moana Minerals and used for conducting surveys for Deep sea mining.

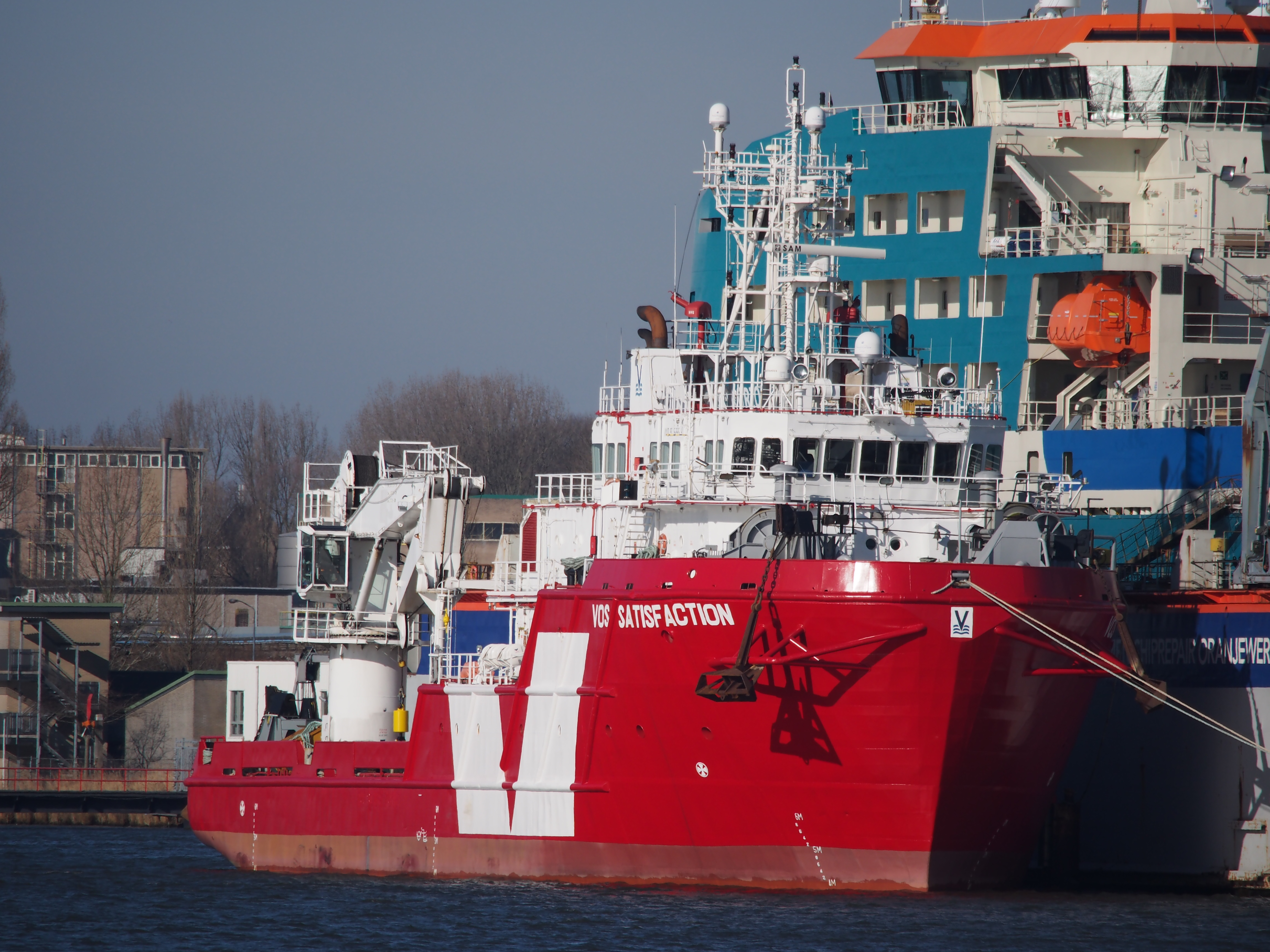
Vos Satisfaction in the Port of Amsterdam, 2018

The ship was previously known as the VOS Satisfaction and previously operated as a subsea support vessel to support underwater diving- and ROV-operations as well as some salvage projects. In 2022 it was modified to provide space for scientists as well as lifting and sonar gear. The vessel is also equipped with onboard geology, chemistry, and biology laboratories; a remote-operated-vehicle; and a box corer, allowing the collection of sediment samples.

The ship arrived in the Cook Islands in February 2023. It was named in March 2023 after a public competition. It began its first survey expedition in March 2023. Cook Islands Prime Minister Mark Brown accompanied the ship for the first stage of its voyage, mapping the seabed from Rarotonga to the Nga-Pu-Toru before docking in Aitutaki.

In November 2023 it began an expedition to explore the seabed between Rarotonga and Aitutaki.

In March 2025 an opportunistic seafloor survey resulted in the discovery of a volcanic hotspot southeast of Rarotonga .

In April 2025 the vessel was engaged in the rescue of two lost fishermen near Rarotonga. In June 2025 it was engaged in public relations work in Mangaia, Mauke, Mitiaro and Atiu.

In March 2026 it mapped the seabed around Pukapuka and Nassau, while delivering supplies to both islands. In April 2026 it used its ROV ina transect survey for marine megafauna.
