= Ngatiarua =

Traditional district on the island of Mauke in the Cook Islands

Coordinates: 20°08′12″S 157°20′41″W

Districts of Mauke

Ngatiarua is one of four traditional districts on the island of Mauke in the Cook Islands. It is in the north of the island, between the districts of Makatea and Vaimutu, and is subdivided into five or six tapere.

Mauke Airport is in this district.
