= Mitiaro School =

- Apii Tematangarengare

Location
- 19°51′5.13″S 157°43′5.33″W

Information
- Principal: Chris Story
- Years offered: 1–11
- Gender: Coeducational
- Enrolment: 36

Mitiaro School or Apii Tematangarengare is a co-educational school on the island of Mitiaro in the Cook Islands. It is the only school on the island and has a roll of 36 students.

The school has three teachers and offers classes from Grade 1 (year 1) to Form 5 (year 11). It offers levels 1 and 2 of the New Zealand National Certificate of Educational Achievement in Maths, English, Science, Geography, and Cook Islands Māori.

The school roll has fallen from 52 in 2015 to 36 in 2020 due to depopulation.
