= Oiretumu =

Coordinates: 20°9′12.44″S 157°20′44.3″W

Orietumu (also known as Areora-Makatea) is a village on Mauke (also known as “Akatokamanava”) in the Cook Islands. The village is inland, near the centre of the island.

The village has a Cook Islands Christian Church.
