= Makea Te Vaerua Ariki =

- High Chiefess of Te Au O Tonga
- Reign: 1845–1857
- Predecessor: Makea Davida Ariki
- Successor: Makea Daniela Ariki
- Born: Unknown; Avarua, Rarotonga
- Died: circa 1857
- Spouse: Papelna (?–1901) or Tiberio, Pastor of the LMS
- Issue: Makea Takau Ariki
- House: House of Te Au O Tonga
- Dynasty: Makea Nui dynasty
- Father: Makea Pori Ariki

Makea Te Vaerua Ariki (b?–1857) was a sovereign of the Cook Islands. She was the ariki (queen or high chiefess) of the Makea Nui (Great Makea) dynasty, one of the three chiefdoms of the Te Au O Tonga tribe on the island of Rarotonga.

Makea Te Vaerua succeeded her elder brother Makea Davida with the involvement of the missionaries and her village was the headquarters of the mission. She was the first female to succeed the title of ariki, even though she had surviving younger brothers. Hers was a peaceful reign. She supported the work of the mission and was very hospitable to all the missionaries of her time. She married the Tahitian missionary Tiberio (also known as Rio).

She was the eldest daughter of Makea Pori Ariki and the birth-mother of Makea Takau. She was succeeded after her death by her younger brother, Makea Daniela.

== See also ==
- History of the Cook Islands
- House of Ariki
