= Coat of arms of the Cook Islands =

National coat of arms

Versions
- Emblem of the Cook Islands Federation
- Armiger: Cook Islands
- Supporters: Flying fish (maroro) and white tern (kakaia)

The coat of arms of the Cook Islands is the heraldic symbol representing the South Pacific island country of the Cook Islands.

== History ==
The coat of arms was designed by Mataiapo Metuakore Teremoana Ngametua Tutakiao Kora BEM, who was also known as Papa Motu Kora. The arms were adopted on 4 August 1978.

== Description ==
The arms have a shield as its focal point. The shield is blue with fifteen white stars arranged in a circle, as found on the national flag and representing the 15 major islands, and is supported by a flying fish (maroro) and a white tern (kakaia). The helmet is an ariki head-dress (pare kura) of red feathers, symbolising the importance of the traditional rank system, and the name of the nation is on a scroll below the shield. The achievement is augmented by a cross and a Rarotongan club (momore taringavaru) used by orators during traditional discourses, respectively symbolizing Christianity and the richness of Cook Islands' tradition, placed in saltire behind the shield.

=== Blazon ===
Coat of arms of the Cook Islands
Notes Crest A chieftains’ headdress of red feathers proper. Escutcheon Azure, a ring of fifteen five-pointed stars argent. Supporters A spear and a processional cross in saltire and a Pacific Sharpchin flying fish (Fodiator rostratus - Exocoetidæ) on the dexter and a sea swallow (Gygis alba - Sternidæ) on the sinister. Compartment Two palm leaves and a pearl proper Motto COOK ISLANDS on a ribbon or.
