= Kimiangatau =

Village in the Cook Islands

Coordinates: 20°8′39.41″S 157°21′22.7″W

Kimiangatau is a village on Mauke in the Cook Islands. The village is on the coast, next to the island's main harbour or Taunganui landing place. It was founded in 1904 after animosity between followers of the London Missionary Society and the newly introduced Roman Catholic church.

At the census of 1 December 2011, Kimiangatau was the largest of Mauke's three villages, with a population of 108.
