= Nga-Pu-Toru =

Coordinates: 19°52′S 157°42′W

Ngaputoru (Māori pronunciation: [ˈŋaːpʉːtɔrʉ]) is the generic name give to the islands of Atiu, Mauke, Mitiaro and Takutea in the Cook Islands archipelago. In the Cook Islands Māori language, the term means "the (nga) roots (pu) three (toru)", or in English "the three roots". Ngaputoru, which is a term used locally, refers to family ties of the ariki (chiefs) of Atiu, Mauke and Mitiaro. The island of Takutea is uninhabited. These islands are in the easternmost part of the Southern Cook Islands.
