= Takutea =

Small island of the Cook Islands

Coordinates: 19°48′47″S 158°17′39″W

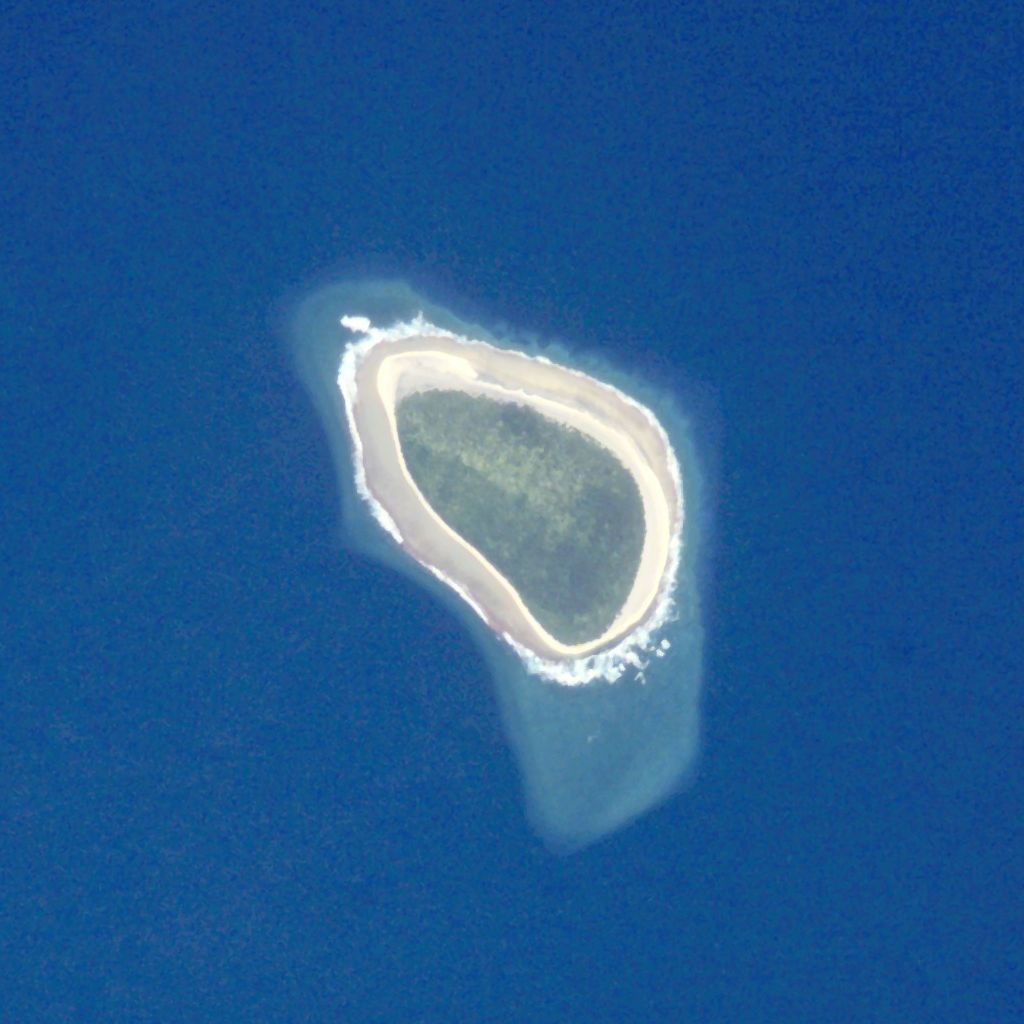
NASA picture of Takutea Island

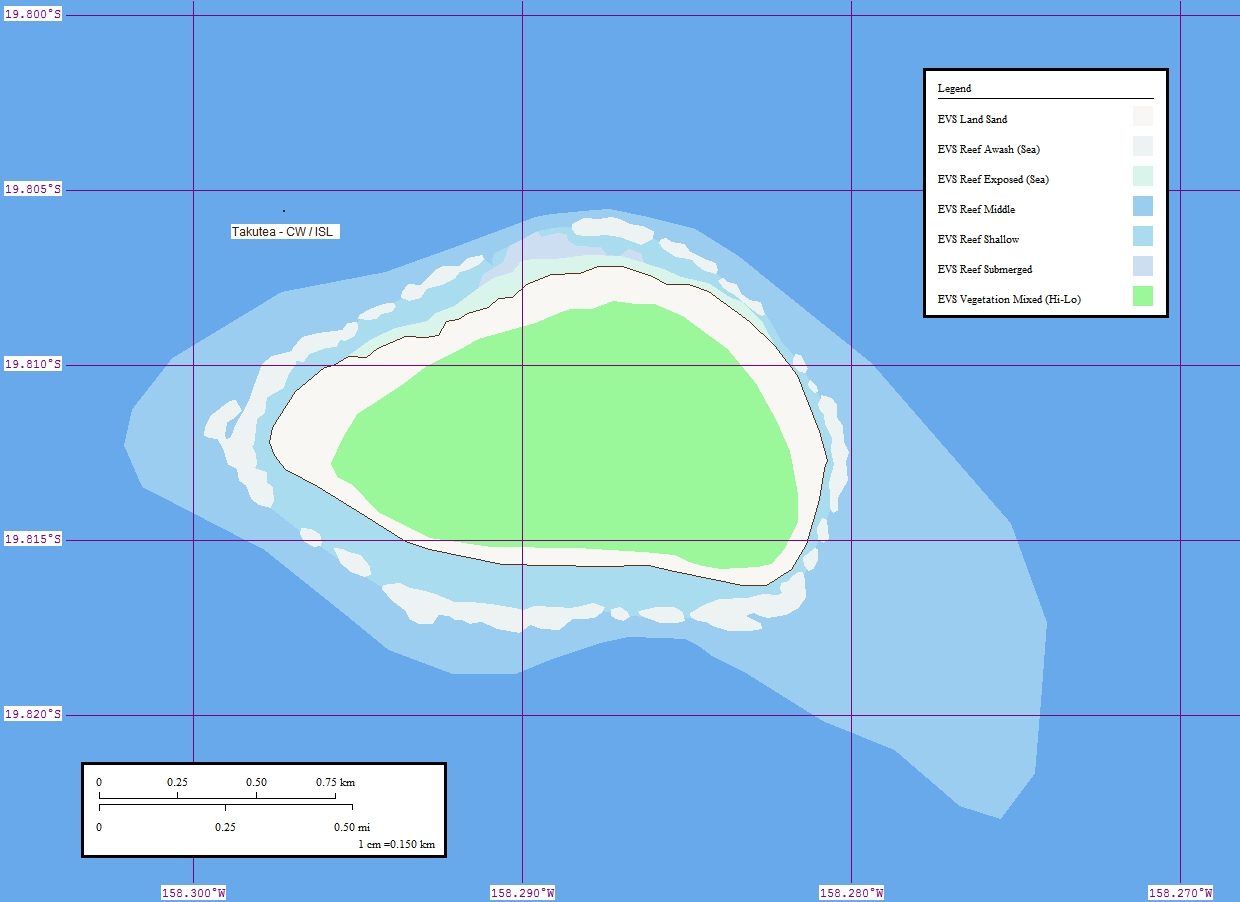
Map of Takutea

Takutea is a small uninhabited island in the Cook Islands, 21 kilometres (13 miles) north-west of Atiu. Administratively, the island is considered part of Atiu, the closest island. It is owned equally by all inhabitants of Atiu and not allocated to one specific village or district of Atiu.

== Geography ==
Takutea is an oval island roughly 1 mile (2 kilometres) long and 3/4 of a mile across. It consists entirely of sand, with a maximum elevation of 20 feet (6 metres). The island is surrounded by a narrow reef. It is believed to be the remains of a large submarine ridge that was destroyed by a volcanic flank collapse.

== History ==
Takutea has never been permanently inhabited. It was originally called Areuna, but was renamed Taka-ku-tea ("my white ku") by the explorer Mariri after he caught a white ku (squirrelfish) there. The island was also known as Enua-iti ("Small Island").

Takutea was visited by the people of Atiu, who collected seabirds and coconuts there and regarded it as tribal land. When Captain James Cook sighted the island on 4 April 1777, and some crew members went ashore, they found some huts, but no evidence of a permanent settlement. Commander Nicolls of H.M.S “Cormorant” declared the island to be under British protection in June 1889. In 1902 it was gifted to Edward VII of Britain by Ngamaru Rongotini Ariki, but this was overturned in 1938 as Rongotini had no right to give it away. In 1905, 60% of the island was cleared and planted with coconut palms for copra production, and the plantation was maintained by visiting workers from Atiu. In 1950 the Land Court of the Cook Islands appointed three ariki and four mataiapo as trustees, to hold it on behalf of the people of Atiu.

Visits to the island declined after 1963, when laws were passed limiting inter-island voyages on traditional craft. Takutea has since been managed as a wildlife sanctuary.

In 2007, a television episode of Survivorman (Les Stroud) was filmed on Takutea Island.

== Ecology ==
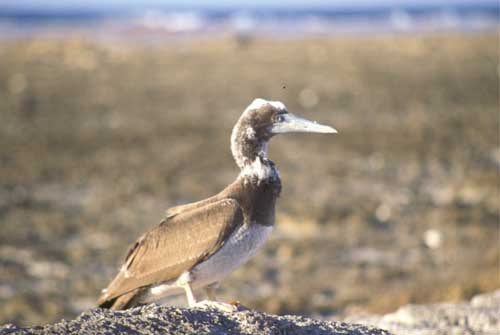
An older juvenile brown booby on Takutea Island

=== Flora ===
Heavily modified for copra production in the early twentieth century, Takutea's vegetation has since been left to recover. A strip of coastal vegetation surrounds a core of native scrub, native forest, and mixed native and coconut forest. The coastal vegetation is dominated by Scaevola sericea interspersed with Heliotropium arboreum and Pandanus tectorius. The inner forest is dominated by Pisonia grandis, Guettarda speciosa, and Coconut, with an underlayer of Tacca leontopetaloides and Asplenium australasicum. A small area of planted Pacific Ironwood in the northwest of the island was planted in the 1960s as a windbreak.

=== Fauna ===
Takutea is a significant breeding site for seabirds, and is home to red-tailed tropicbirds and red-footed boobies. Other nesting species include the great frigatebird, brown booby, brown noddy, black noddy and white tern. The island is also home to coconut crabs.

Because of its importance as a seabird breeding area, Takutea's trustees manage it as a wildlife sanctuary, and have banned the killing of birds or the removal of red tropicbird tail-feathers. No species may be removed from the island or its lagoon without the approval of the trustees. The island, with its surrounding waters, has also been designated an Important Bird Area (IBA) by BirdLife International.

== See also ==
- Desert island
- List of islands
