= Makea Pori Ariki =

- High Chief of Te Au O Tonga
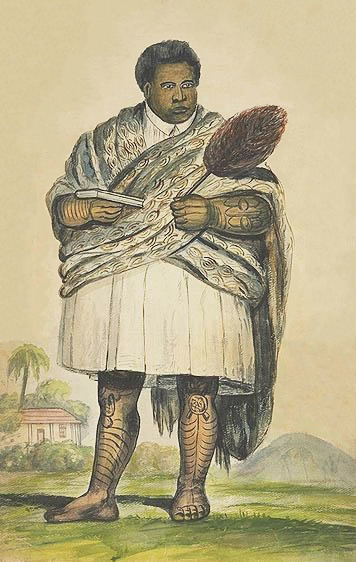
- Makea Pori Ariki (c. 1837)
- Reign: 1823–1839
- Predecessor: Makea Tinirau Ariki
- Successor: Makea Davida Ariki
- Born: Unknown; Avarua, Rarotonga
- Died: 28 October 1839
- Issue: Makea Te Vaerua Ariki
- House: House of Te Au O Tonga
- Dynasty: Makea Nui dynasty

Makea Pori Ariki (b – 28 October 1839) was a sovereign of the Cook Islands. He was the ariki (king or high chief) of the Makea Nui (Great Makea) dynasty, one of the three chiefdoms of the Te Au O Tonga tribe on the island of Rarotonga.

He was the son of Makea Tinirau Ariki. According to at least one account, when the English missionary John Williams and the Tahitian evangelist Papeiha arrived at Rarotonga in 1823, Makea Pori was the ariki, but that his father had retired and was still alive, being known also by the name Makea Metua (metua meaning 'father'). His father died in 1826. After agreeing to destroy their temple and the pagan idols of his tribe, Makea Pori Ariki was baptized in 1825.

He died on 28 October 1839 and was succeeded by his eldest son Makea Davida, who was in turn succeeded by his sister, Makea Pori's eldest daughter Makea Te Vaerua Ariki.

== See also ==
- History of the Cook Islands
- House of Ariki
