= Kingdom of Rarotonga =

Kingdom in the present-day Cook Islands

Coordinates: 21°12′S 159°46′W

Kingdom of Rarotonga Mātāmuatanga Rarotonga
- 1858–1893
- Flag (1858–1888)
- Anthem: God Save the Queen (from 1888)
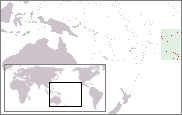
- Status: Protectorate of the United Kingdom (from 1888)
- Capital: Avarua (presumed)
- Government: Monarchy
- Historical era: New Imperialism
  - Established: 1858
  - Protectorate: 1888
  - Disestablished: 1893
Succeeded by
Cook Islands Federation

The flag of Rarotonga 1858–1888. The three stars represent the three tribes (vaka) of Rarotonga: Takitumu; Te Au O Tonga; Puaikura

The Kingdom of Rarotonga (Cook Islands Māori: Mātāmuatanga Rarotonga), named after the island of Rarotonga, was an independent kingdom established in the present-day Cook Islands in 1858. In 1888 it became a protectorate of the United Kingdom at its own request. In 1893 the name was changed to the Cook Islands Federation.

== Establishment ==
After the early conversion of a number of important ariki (high chiefs) support for Christianity increased rapidly throughout the Southern Group. Working through the ariki the missionaries drew up draft legal codes which together with the abolition of violence as a means of dispute settlement, led to unprecedented political stability. The Kingdom of Rarotonga was established in 1858. In 1881 the British Colonial Office decided that New Zealand interests in the area needed some form of protection against foreign powers and the British Government granted a petition by local European traders and planters for the appointment of an unpaid British Consul for the Hervey Islands, as the Southern Group was then known.

== British Protectorate ==
In October 1885 the Colonial Office accepted an offer by New Zealand, which was then a self-governing British colony, for New Zealand to pay for a British Consul for Rarotonga on condition that he be nominated by New Zealand and act as the country's official agent. This "Resident" was also to act as adviser to the ariki in drafting and administering laws and he would sign all acts of the local legislature in the name of the Governor of New Zealand. He would also have the right to reject proposed legislation. In 1888 Queen Makea Takau formally petitioned the British to set up a Protectorate to head off what she believed to be imminent invasion by the French. The British Government agreed to permit its then vice-consul in Rarotonga to declare a Protectorate over the Southern Group islands to protect pro-British islanders and New Zealand trade. The Colonial Office also decided that certain other Northern Group islands should be annexed for possible future use as trans-Pacific cable stations.

== Federation ==
In 1890 the newly appointed British Resident, Frederick Moss, persuaded the ariki of Rarotonga to form a provisional Rarotongan legislature or General Council, the first government for the entire island. The following year representatives of the ariki from Rarotonga and the Southern Group islands agreed to form the first federal legislature in the islands. However, the path through the last decade of the 19th century was far from smooth and the numerous changes that took place were not well accepted by some ariki and members of the nobility.

== Annexation ==
Flag of Rarotonga 1888-1893

The British were reluctant administrators and continued pressure was applied to them from New Zealand and from European residents of the islands to pass the Cook Islands over to New Zealand. Ill feeling between the islanders and New Zealand reached a point where two ariki told the New Zealand premier, Richard Seddon, that the traditional leaders wanted the Cook Islands to stay annexed to Great Britain. On 27 September 1900, the Parliament of New Zealand approved the annexation of the islands to New Zealand and the following month the New Zealand Governor, Lord Ranfurly, landed in Rarotonga. The five ariki and seven lesser chiefs signed a deed of cession, and the Cook Islands were annexed by New Zealand on 7 October 1900 without any debate or examination of the ramifications or implications.

On 11 June 1901, the boundaries of New Zealand were extended to include the Cook Islands, and the power of the ariki was removed.

== See also ==
- History of the Cook Islands
