= Areora =

Coordinates: 20°10′00″S 157°20′30″W

Districts of Mauke

Areora is one of four traditional districts on the island of Mauke in the Cook Islands. It is in the south of the island, and is subdivided into three tapere.
