= Mauke =

Island of the Cook Islands

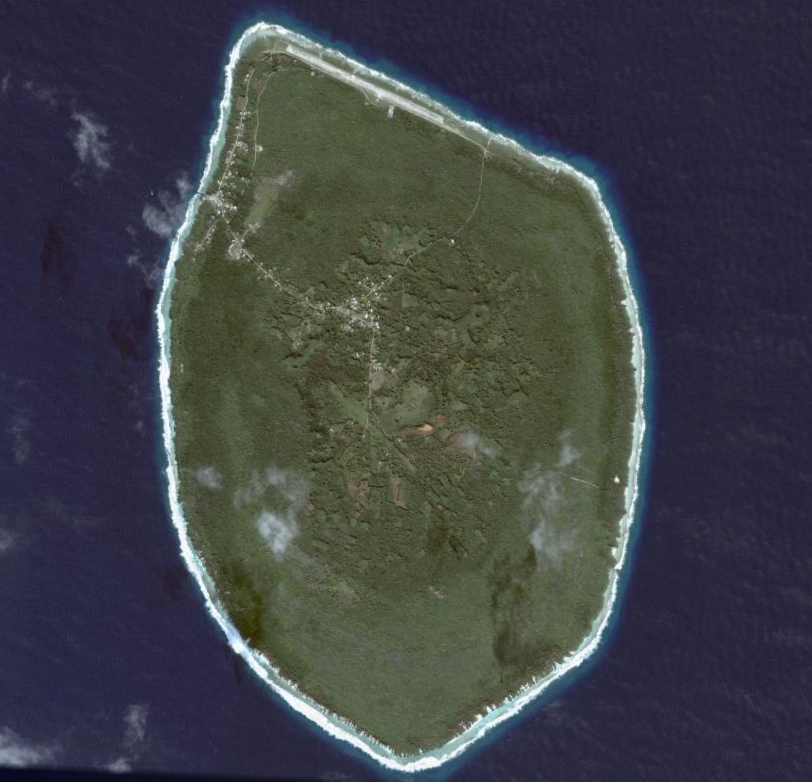
- Satellite image of Mauke
- Interactive map of Mauke

Geography
- Location: Central-Southern Pacific Ocean
- Coordinates: 20.1583°S 157.3417°W
- Archipelago: Cook Islands
- Area: 18.4 km^{2} (7.1 sq mi)

Administration
- Cook Islands

Demographics
- Population: 297 (2016)
- Ethnic groups: Polynesian

Location of Mauke in the Pacific Ocean

Traditional subdivision in districts and tapere

Mauke (Ma'uke also Akatokamanava) is an island of the Cook Islands archipelago, lying in the central-southern Pacific Ocean. One of the Nga-Pu-Toru islands, it is 277 km (172 mi) northeast of Rarotonga.

== Geography ==
Mauke is a raised coral atoll, with a central volcanic plateau surrounded by a jagged fossilised coral makatea which extends up to one mile inland. A narrow layer of swamps lies between the makatea and the plateau. The entire island is surrounded by a fringing reef, pierced by six passages, and sits atop an extinct volcano rising 4,500 m (14,800 ft) from the ocean floor.

The volcanic soil in the island's center is relatively fertile, so it is called "The Garden of the Islands". The makatea is honeycombed with caves, including the Vaitango Cave, Moti Cave and Motuanga Cave.

== History ==
According to oral tradition, Mauke was discovered by Uke, and the island was named "Ma'uke" – "the land of Uke" – after him. Uke's descents then went on to settle Atiu. Another legend states a son of Ruatapu was murdered on Mauke, and in retaliation he killed many of the islands inhabitants. The island was dominated by Atiu, whose inhabitants frequently raided it. The first European to sight Mauke was John Williams of the London Missionary Society, in 1823. He left behind a Polynesian preacher, Haavi, to introduce Christianity. The second European visitor was Captain Lord Byron of HMS Blonde in 1825, who named it "Parry Island" in honour of Sir William Edward Parry. In the 1840s an Atiuian expedition attempted to raid the island again, but retreated after hearing that the Maukeans had been supplied with muskets by a European trader. In the 1860s Ngamaru Rongotini Ariki, ariki of Atiu, Mauke and Mitiaro, married Makea Takau Ariki, a Rarotongan ariki. As a result, in 1871 Mauke became part of the Kingdom of Rarotonga.

In 1888 Mauke became a British protectorate as part of the Cook Islands Federation. In 1901 it was annexed by New Zealand.

In 1904, animosity between followers of the London Missionary Society and the newly introduced Roman Catholic church led to the formation of the village of Kimiangatau on Mauke's coast. The Sisters of Our Lady of Nazareth ran St Mary's School until 1986, when they left and the Sisters of St Joseph of Cluny came to take over. The Cluny Sisters left at the end of 2001. The government-run Mauke School is now the only school.

== Demographics ==
Historical population
Year	Pop.	±%
1906	446	—
1916	490	+9.9%
1926	511	+4.3%
1936	652	+27.6%
1951	836	+28.2%
1961	785	−6.1%
1966	671	−14.5%
1976	710	+5.8%
1986	692	−2.5%
1996	652	−5.8%
2001	470	−27.9%
2006	391	−16.8%
2011	307	−21.5%
2016	297	−3.3%

Mauke's population was 297 in 2016. At the 2016 census one-third of the population was under 19 years of age, and 24% over 60.

The island is subdivided into four traditional districts. Vaimutu and Makatea are not further subdivided and correspond to one tapere each. Ngatiarua and Areora districts are subdivided into 6 and 3 tapere, respectively, totalling 11 tapere for the whole island:

- Ngatiarua District (north, subdivided into 6 tapere: Te Tukunga, Mokoero, Puneua, Ikurua, Arakiropu, Araki)
- Vaimutu District (east, corresponds to 1 tapere)
- Areora District (south, subdivided into 3 tapere: Tukume, Arao, Anua)
- Makatea District (west, corresponds to 1 tapere)

Oiretumu, the principal village, is located inland, mainly within the traditional Makatea district. Stretching north from Taunganui Landing, the commonly used western landing is the village of Kimiangatau, mainly within Ikurua tapere of Ngatiarua District.

== Economy ==
Mauke's economy is primarily government-supported, with 61% of the labour force employed in the public sector. Its primary export is maire, a plant which is used to make leis. There is little tourism, with only two budget accommodation providers on the island.

Mauke is connected to the rest of the Cook Islands by Mauke Airport. The island's main harbour was damaged by cyclones in 2005. An upgrade began in 2011, and was completed in 2013.

Previously powered by diesel generators, since 2019 it has been powered by a 229 kW solar-diesel power station.
