= Mitiaro =

Island of the Cook Islands

Coordinates: 19°52′S 157°42′W

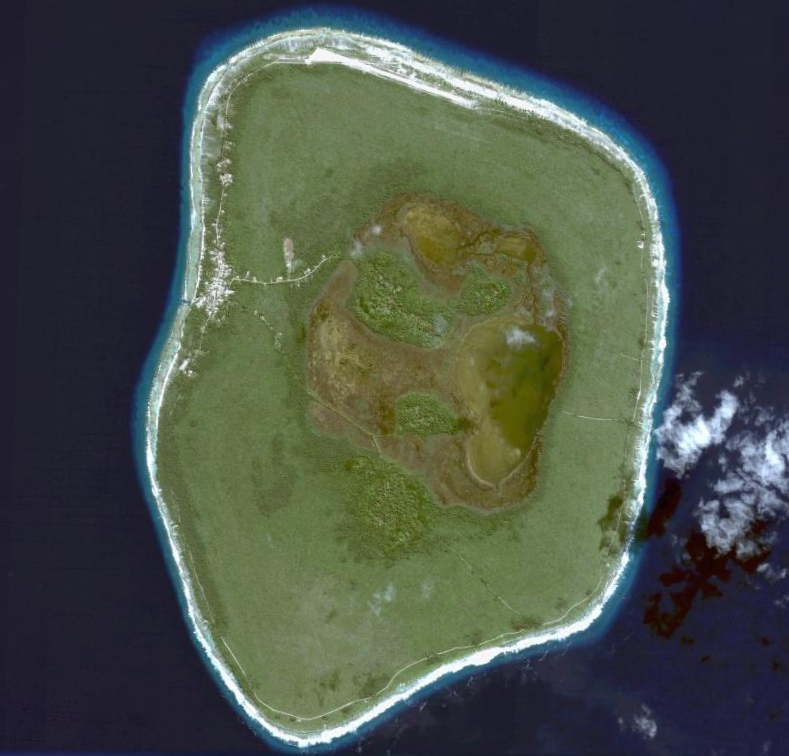
- Aerial photo of Mitiaro

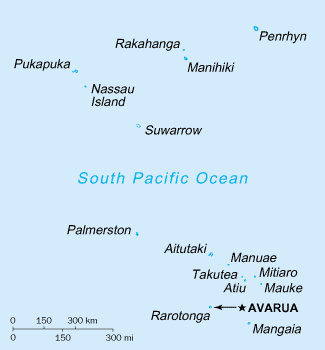
- Map of the Cook Islands

Geography
- Area: 22.25 km^{2} (8.59 sq mi)
- Coastline: 18.1 km (11.25 mi)
- Highest elevation: 10.9 m (35.8 ft)
- Highest point: western makatea between Atai and Omutu

Administration
- Cook Islands

Demographics
- Population: 155 (2016)

Mitiʻāro, the fourth island in the Cook Islands group, is of volcanic origin. Standing in water 14,750 feet (4,500 m) deep it is four miles (6.4 km) across at its widest point.

== Geography ==
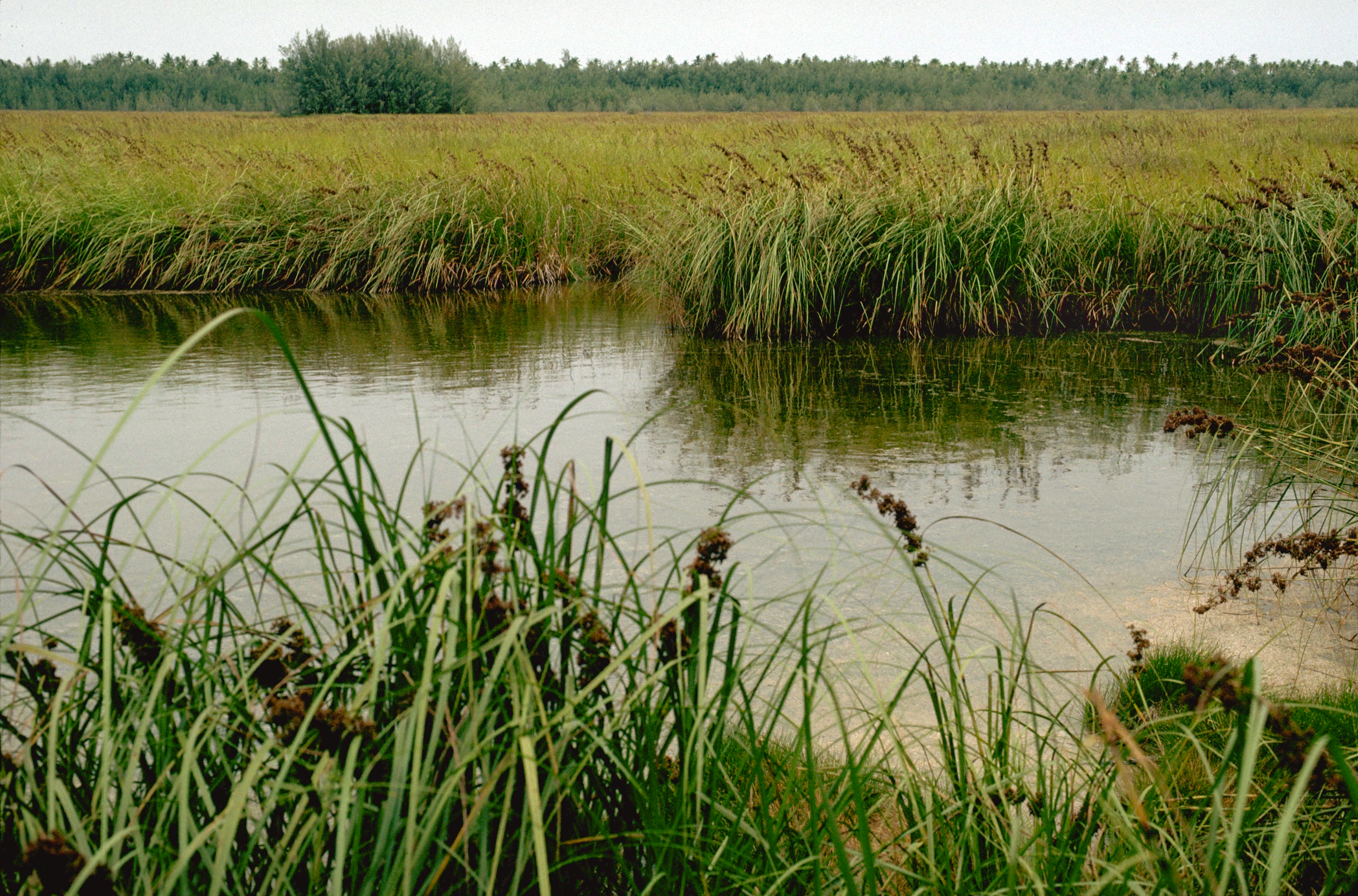
Swamp on Mitiaro.

Mitiaro, also known as Nukuroa, is part of the Nga-Pu-Toru island group, formerly a volcano that became a coral atoll. The coral died forming fossilised coral (known locally as makatea). The island is surrounded by a belt of this makatea, between 20 and 40 feet (6.1 and 12.2 metres) high and characteristic of islands in the southern group. The centre of the island is almost flat, quite swampy and contains two freshwater lakes, Rotonui (big lake) and Toto Iti (small lake).

The lakes are teeming with eels (Anguilla obscura), which the locals call itiki and who reach the lakes from the Ocean through underwater connections, and the imported tilapia from Africa where it is known as bream. The island has around 18 km of coastline. Beaches are limited but there are subterranean limestone caves and the beach at low tide abounds in marine life.

=== Important Bird Area ===
The island has been designated an Important Bird Area (IBA) by BirdLife International because it supports populations of Rimatara lorikeets and Cook reed warblers. It is a non-breeding site for bristle-thighed curlews.

=== Settlement ===
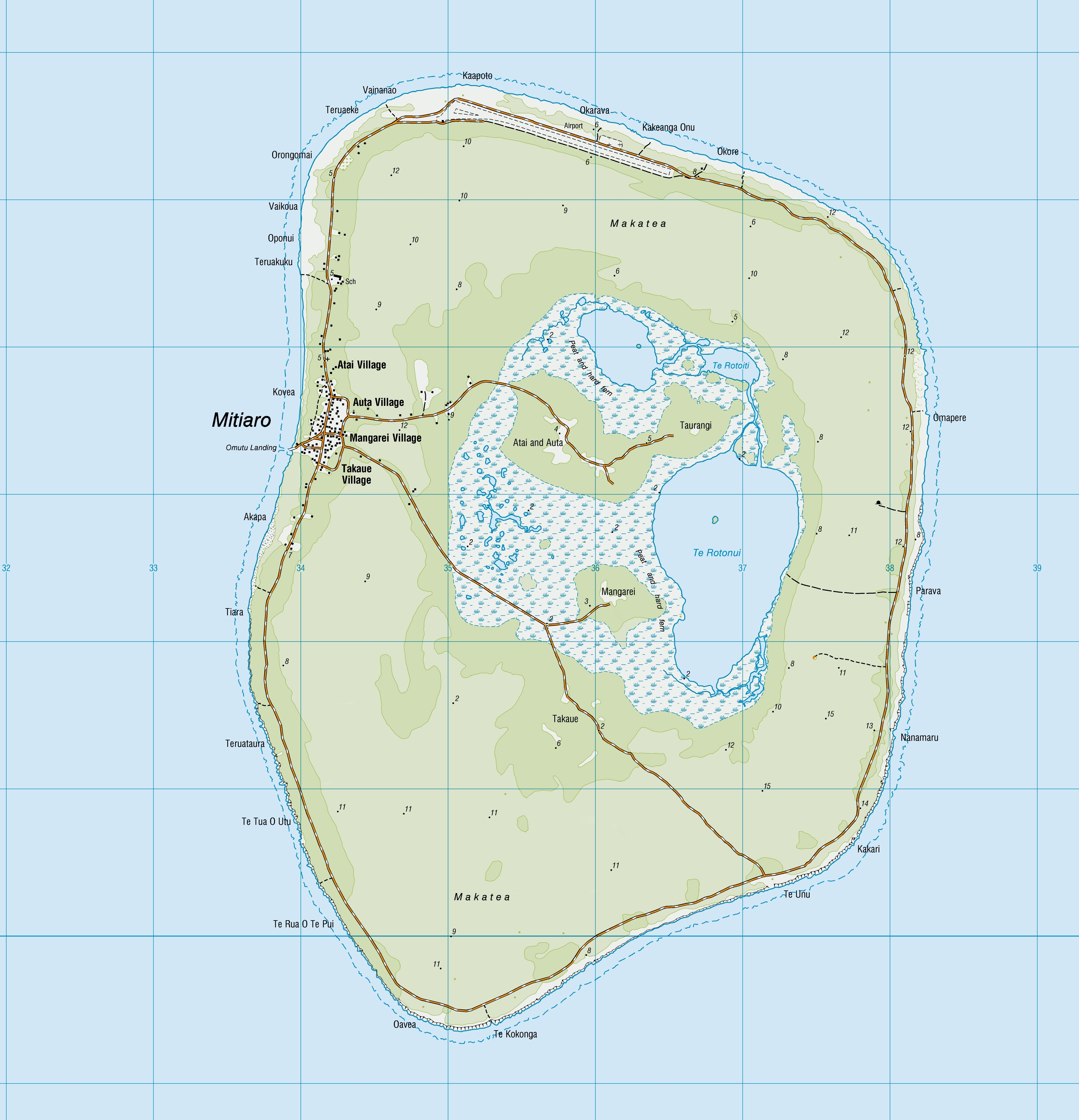
Topographic map of Mitiaro.

The island has four villages, located close together on the western side, from north to south:

1. Taurangi (a former village)
2. Atai (also called Arai)
3. Auta
4. Mangarei
5. Takaue

Among the populated lifted coral islands of the southern Cook Islands, only Mitiaro is not subdivided into traditional tapere.

== Infrastructure ==
Mitiaro School is located in the principal village, Atai. Takaue is the second largest village. Mitiaro Airport is located at the northern end of the island. There are three churches: the Cook Islands Christian Church, the Catholic Church and the Assembly of God.

In May 2018 the island's diesel generator was replaced by a Solar Photovoltaic system.

== History ==
According to oral tradition, Mitiaro was settled from Atiu, and was historically dominated by that island. It was first discovered by Europeans when John Williams of the London Missionary Society arrived in 1823. He left behind a Polynesian teacher, Taua, who began converting the islanders to Christianity. The estimated population at that time was less than 100 inhabitants. During the 1840s the island was attacked again by Atiuans.

In 1888 Mitiaro became a British protectorate as part of the Cook Islands Federation. In 1901 it was annexed by New Zealand.

Historical population
Year	Pop.	±%
1906	210	—
1916	237	+12.9%
1926	238	+0.4%
1936	265	+11.3%
1951	305	+15.1%
1961	307	+0.7%
1966	293	−4.6%
1976	305	+4.1%
1986	273	−10.5%
1996	319	+16.8%
2001	230	−27.9%
2006	219	−4.8%
2011	189	−13.7%
2016	155	−18.0%
