= Cook Islands =

Country in the South Pacific Ocean

(in other official languages)
Penrhyn	Kūki Airani
Cook Islands Māori	Kūki 'Airani
- Flag Coat of arms
- Anthem: Te Atua mou ē (Māori) "God of Truth"
- Status: Self governing state in Free Association with New Zealand
- Capital and largest city: Avarua; 21°12′27″S 159°46′30″W
- Official languages: English; Cook Islands Māori; Pukapukan (Note: As per the Te Reo Maori Act.)
- Spoken languages: English (86.4%); Cook Islands Māori (76.2%); other (8.3%)
- Ethnic groups (2021 census): 77.42% Cook Island Māori; 8.31% part-Māori; 14.27% other
- Demonym: Cook Islander
- Government: Constitutional monarchy
  - Monarch: Charles III
  - King's Representative: Sir Tom Marsters
  - Prime Minister: Mark Brown
  - President of the House of Ariki: Tou Travel Ariki
- Legislature: Parliament

Free association with New Zealand
  - Self-governance: 4 August 1965
  - UN recognition of independence in foreign relations: 1992

Area
  - Total: 236.7 km^{2} (91.4 sq mi) (unranked)

Population
  - 2021 census: 15,040 (223rd)
  - Density: 63.3/km^{2} (163.9/sq mi) (138th)
- GDP (nominal): 2020 estimate
  - Total: US$384 million (not ranked)
  - Per capita: US$21,994 (not ranked)
- Currency: New Zealand dollar (NZD); Cook Islands dollar
- Time zone: UTC–10 (CKT)
- Calling code: +682
- ISO 3166 code: CK
- Internet TLD: .ck

The Cook Islands (Note: Rarotongan: Kūki ‘Airani; Penrhyn: Kūki Airani) is an island country in Polynesia, part of Oceania, in the South Pacific Ocean. While self-governing, the country is in free association with New Zealand. It consists of 15 islands whose total land area is approximately 236.7 square kilometres (91 sq mi). The Cook Islands Exclusive Economic Zone (EEZ) covers 1,960,027 square kilometres (756,771 sq mi) of ocean. The capital is Avarua, located on the island of Rarotonga.

Since the start of the 21st century, the country has conducted its own independent foreign and defence policy, and also its own customs regulations. Like most members of the Pacific Islands Forum, the country has no armed forces, but the Cook Islands Police Service owns a Guardian Class Patrol Boat, CIPPB Te Kukupa II, provided by Australia, for policing its waters. In recent decades, the Cook Islands has adopted an increasingly assertive and distinct foreign policy, and a Cook Islander, Henry Puna, served as Secretary General of the Pacific Islands Forum from 2021 to 2024. Most Cook Islanders have New Zealand citizenship, plus the status of Cook Islands nationals, which is not given to other New Zealand citizens. The Cook Islands have been an active member of the Pacific Community, formerly the South Pacific Commission, since 1980.

The Cook Islands' main population centres are on Rarotonga (10,863 in 2021), also the location of Rarotonga International Airport, the main international gateway to the country. The census of 2021 put the total population at 14,987. There is also a larger population of Cook Islanders in New Zealand and Australia: in the 2018 New Zealand census, 80,532 people said they were Cook Islanders, or of Cook Islands descent. The last Australian census recorded 28,000 Cook Islanders living in Australia, many with Australian citizenship. With over 168,000 visitors to the islands in 2018, tourism is the country's main industry and leading element of its economy, ahead of offshore banking, pearls, and marine and fruit exports.

== Etymology ==
The Cook Islands comprise 15 islands that have had individual names in indigenous languages, including Cook Islands Māori and Pukapukan throughout the time they have been inhabited. The first name given by Europeans was Gente Hermosa (beautiful people) by Spanish explorers to Rakahanga in 1606.

The islands as a whole are named after the English captain and explorer James Cook, who visited during the 1770s and named Manuae "Hervey Island" after Augustus Hervey, 3rd Earl of Bristol. The southern island group became known as the "Hervey Islands" after this. In the 1820s, Russian Admiral Adam Johann von Krusenstern referred to the southern islands as the "Cook Islands" in his Atlas de l'Ocean Pacifique. The entire territory (including the northern island group) was not known as the "Cook Islands" until after its annexation by New Zealand in the early 20th century. In 1901, the New Zealand parliament passed the Cook and other Islands Government Act, demonstrating that the name "Cook Islands" only referred to some of the islands. This situation had changed by the passage of the Cook Islands Act 1915, which defined the Cooks' area and included all presently included islands.

The islands' official name in Cook Islands Māori is Kūki 'Āirani, a transliteration of the English name.

== History ==
=== Precolonial period ===
The Cook Islands were first settled around AD 1000 by Polynesian people who are thought to have migrated from Tahiti, an island 1,154 kilometres (717 mi; 623 nmi) to the northeast of the main island of Rarotonga.

=== Early European contact ===
The first European contact with the islands took place in 1595 when the Spanish navigator Álvaro de Mendaña de Neira sighted the island of Pukapuka, which he named San Bernardo (Saint Bernard). Pedro Fernandes de Queirós, a Portuguese captain at the service of the Spanish Crown, made the first European landing in the islands when he set foot on Rakahanga in 1606, calling the island Gente Hermosa (Beautiful People).

British explorer and naval officer Captain James Cook arrived in 1773 and again in 1777, giving the island of Manuae the name Hervey Island. The Hervey Islands later came to be applied to the entire southern group. The name "Cook Islands", in honour of Cook, first appeared on a Russian naval chart published by Adam Johann von Krusenstern in the 1820s.

In 1813 the crew on the colonial brig Endeavour (not the same ship as Cook's) made the first recorded European sighting of Rarotonga. The first recorded landing on Rarotonga by Europeans was in 1814 by the Cumberland; trouble broke out between the sailors and the Islanders and many were killed on both sides. The islands saw no more Europeans until English missionaries arrived in 1821. Christianity quickly took hold in the culture and many islanders are Christians today.

The islands were a popular stop in the 19th century for whaling ships from the United States, Britain and Australia. They visited, from at least 1826, to obtain water, food, and firewood. Their favourite islands were Rarotonga, Aitutaki, Mangaia and Penrhyn.

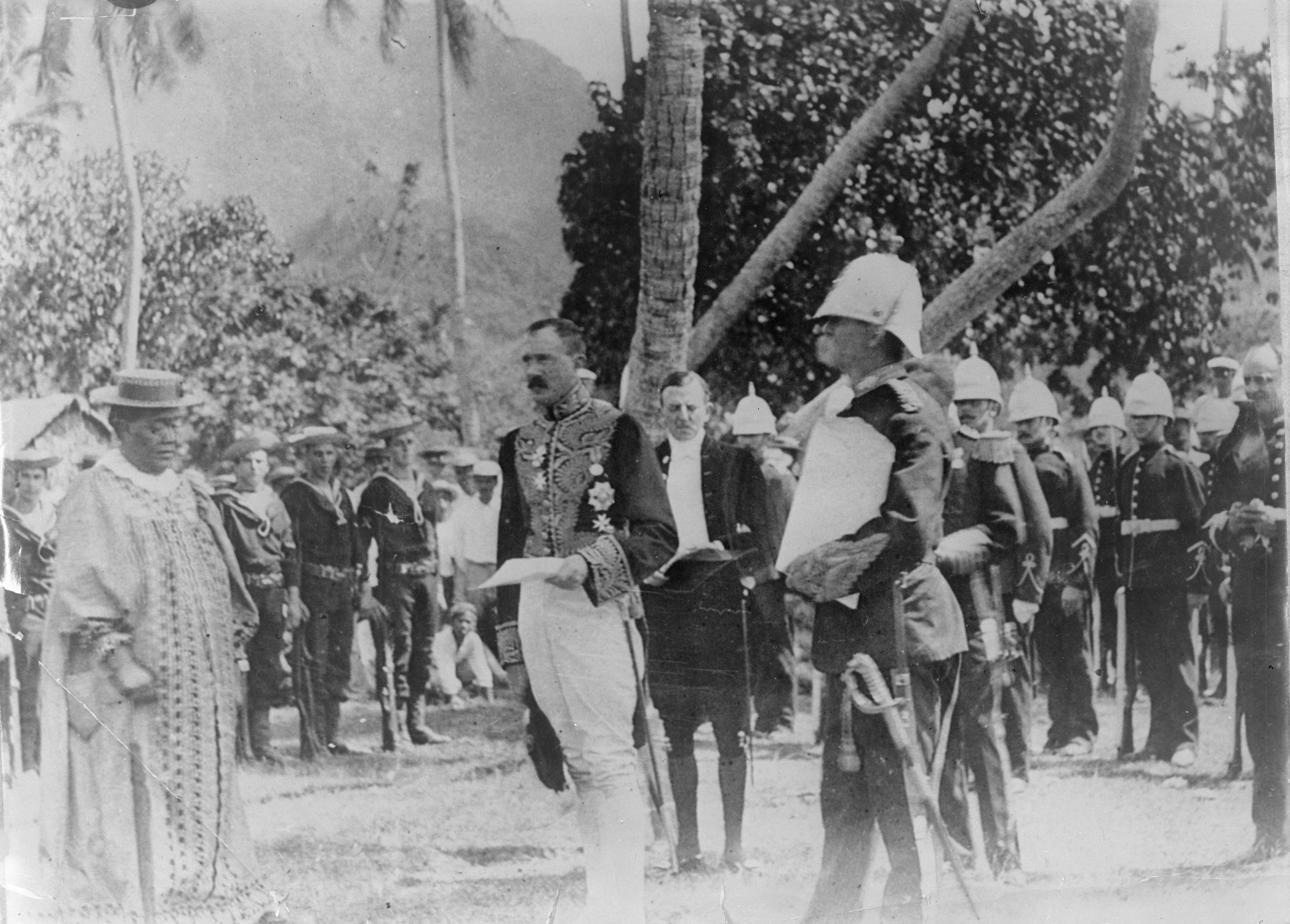
Governor Lord Ranfurly reading the annexation proclamation to Queen Makea on 7 October 1900

=== British protectorate and annexation by New Zealand ===
The Cook Islands became a British protectorate in 1888, following a petition from Queen Makea Takau Ariki, largely because of the fear of British residents that France might occupy the islands, as it already had Tahiti. On 6 September 1900, the islanders' leaders presented a petition asking that the islands (including Niue "if possible") should be annexed as British territory. On 8 and 9 October 1900, seven instruments of cession of Rarotonga and other islands were signed by their chiefs and people. A British Proclamation was issued, stating that the cessions were accepted and the islands declared parts of Her Britannic Majesty's dominions. However, it did not include Aitutaki. Even though the inhabitants regarded themselves as British subjects, the Crown's title was unclear until the island was formally annexed by that Proclamation. In 1901 the islands were included within the boundaries of the Colony of New Zealand by Order in Council under the Colonial Boundaries Act, 1895 of the United Kingdom. The boundary change became effective on 11 June 1901, and the Cook Islands have had a formal relationship with New Zealand since that time.

The Cook Islands responded to the call for service when World War I began, immediately sending five contingents, close to 500 men, to the war. The island's young men volunteered at the outbreak of the war to reinforce the Māori Contingents and the Australian and New Zealand Mounted Rifles. A Patriotic Fund was set up very quickly, raising funds to support the war effort. The Cook Islanders were trained at Narrow Neck Camp in Devonport, and the first recruits departed on 13 October 1915 on the SS Te Anau. The ship arrived in Egypt just as the New Zealand units were about to be transferred to the Western Front. In September 1916, the Pioneer Battalion, a combination of Cook Islanders, Māori and Pakeha soldiers, saw heavy action in the Allied attack on Flers, the first battle of the Somme. Three Cook Islanders from this first contingent died from enemy action, and at least ten died of disease as they struggled to adapt to the conditions in Europe. The 2nd and 3rd Cook Island Contingents were part of the Sinai-Palestine campaign, first in a logistical role for the Australian and New Zealand Mounted Rifles at their Moascar base and later in ammunition supply for the Royal Artillery. After the war, the men returned to the outbreak of the influenza epidemic in New Zealand, and this, along with European diseases meant that a large number did not survive and died in New Zealand or on their return home over the coming years.

=== Self government ===
When the British Nationality and New Zealand Citizenship Act 1948 came into effect on 1 January 1949, Cook Islanders who were British subjects automatically gained New Zealand citizenship. The islands remained a New Zealand dependent territory until the New Zealand Government decided to grant them self-governing status. On 4 August 1965, a constitution was promulgated. The first Monday in August is celebrated each year as Constitution Day. Albert Henry of the Cook Islands Party was elected as the first Premier and was knighted by Queen Elizabeth II. Henry led the nation until 1978, when he was accused of vote-rigging and resigned. He was stripped of his knighthood in 1979. He was succeeded by Tom Davis of the Democratic Party, who held that position until March 1983.

On 13 July 2017, the Cook Islands established Marae Moana, making it become the world's largest protected area by size.

In March 2019, it was reported that the Cook Islands had plans to change its name and remove the reference to Captain James Cook in favour of "a title that reflects its 'Polynesian nature'". It was later reported in May 2019 that the proposed name change had been poorly received by the Cook Islands diaspora. As a compromise, it was decided that the English name of the islands would not be altered, but that a new Cook Islands Māori name would be adopted to replace the current name, a transliteration from English. Discussions over the name continued in 2020.

== Geography ==
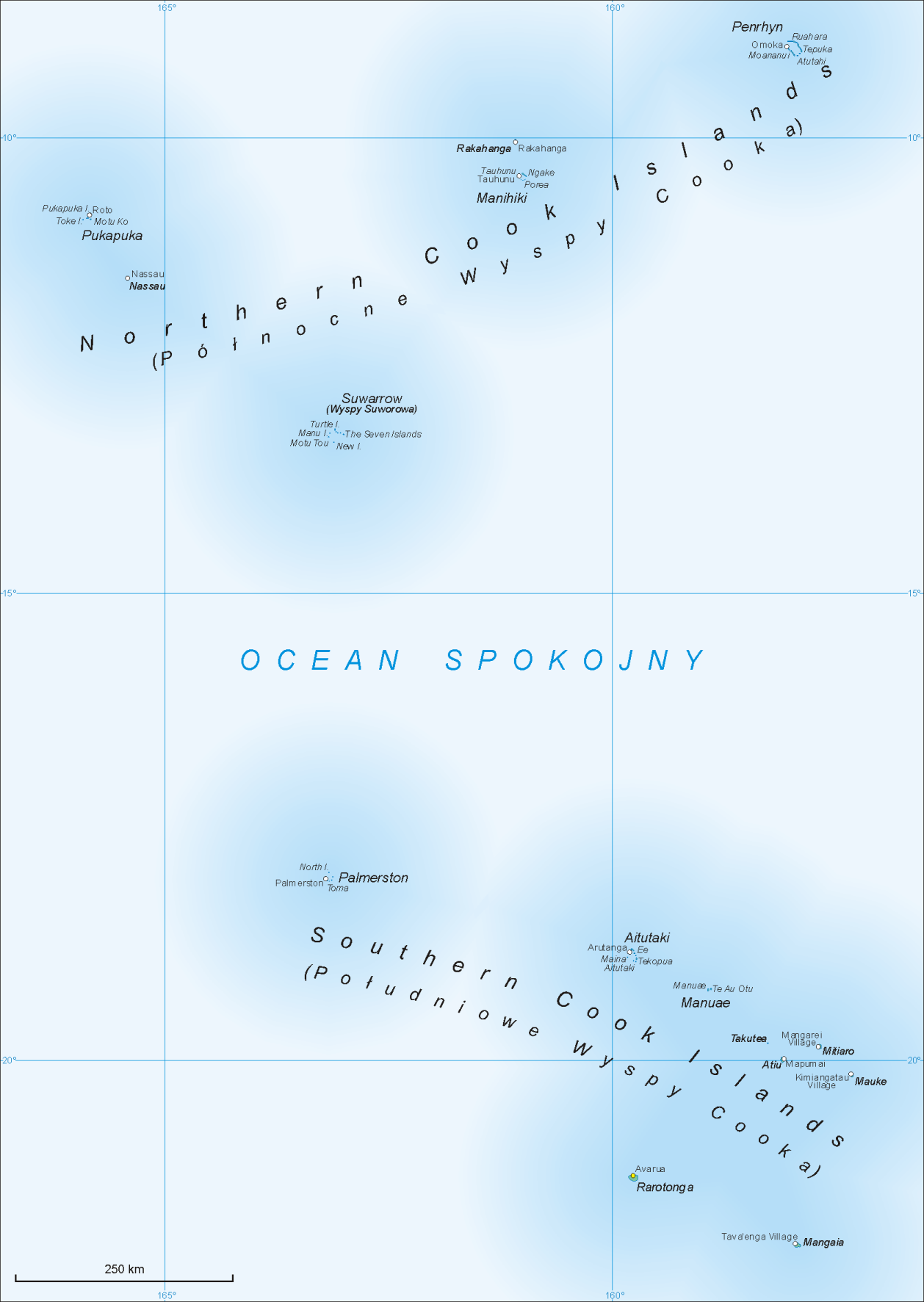
Map of the Cook Islands

The Cook Islands are in the South Pacific Ocean, north-east of New Zealand, between American Samoa and French Polynesia. There are 15 major islands spread over 2,200,000 km^{2} (850,000 sq mi) of ocean, divided into two distinct groups: the Southern Cook Islands and the Northern Cook Islands of coral atolls.

The islands were formed by volcanic activity; the northern group is older and consists of six atolls, which are sunken volcanoes topped by coral growth. The climate is moderate to tropical. The Cook Islands consist of 15 islands and two reefs. From March to December, the Cook Islands are in the path of tropical cyclones, the most notable of which were the cyclones Martin and Percy. Two terrestrial ecoregions lie within the islands' territory: the Central Polynesian tropical moist forests and the Cook Islands tropical moist forests.

Island group	Island	Area (km^{2})	Population	Density per km^{2}
Northern	Penrhyn atoll	10	233	24
Northern	Rakahanga	4	81	20
Northern	Manihiki	5	215	40
Northern	Pukapuka	1	456	351
Northern	Tema Reef (submerged)	0	0	–
Northern	Nassau	1	92	71
Northern	Suwarrow	0.4	0	0
Southern	Palmerston	2	25	12
Southern	Aitutaki	18	1,782	97
Southern	Manuae	6	0	0
Southern	Takutea	1	0	0
Southern	Mitiaro	22	155	7
Southern	Atiu	27	383	14
Southern	Mauke	18	249	14
Southern	Winslow Reef (submerged)	0	0	–
Southern	Rarotonga	67	10,898	162
Southern	Mangaia	52	471	9
Total	Total	237	15,040	64

The table is ordered from north to south. Figures are from the 2021 census.

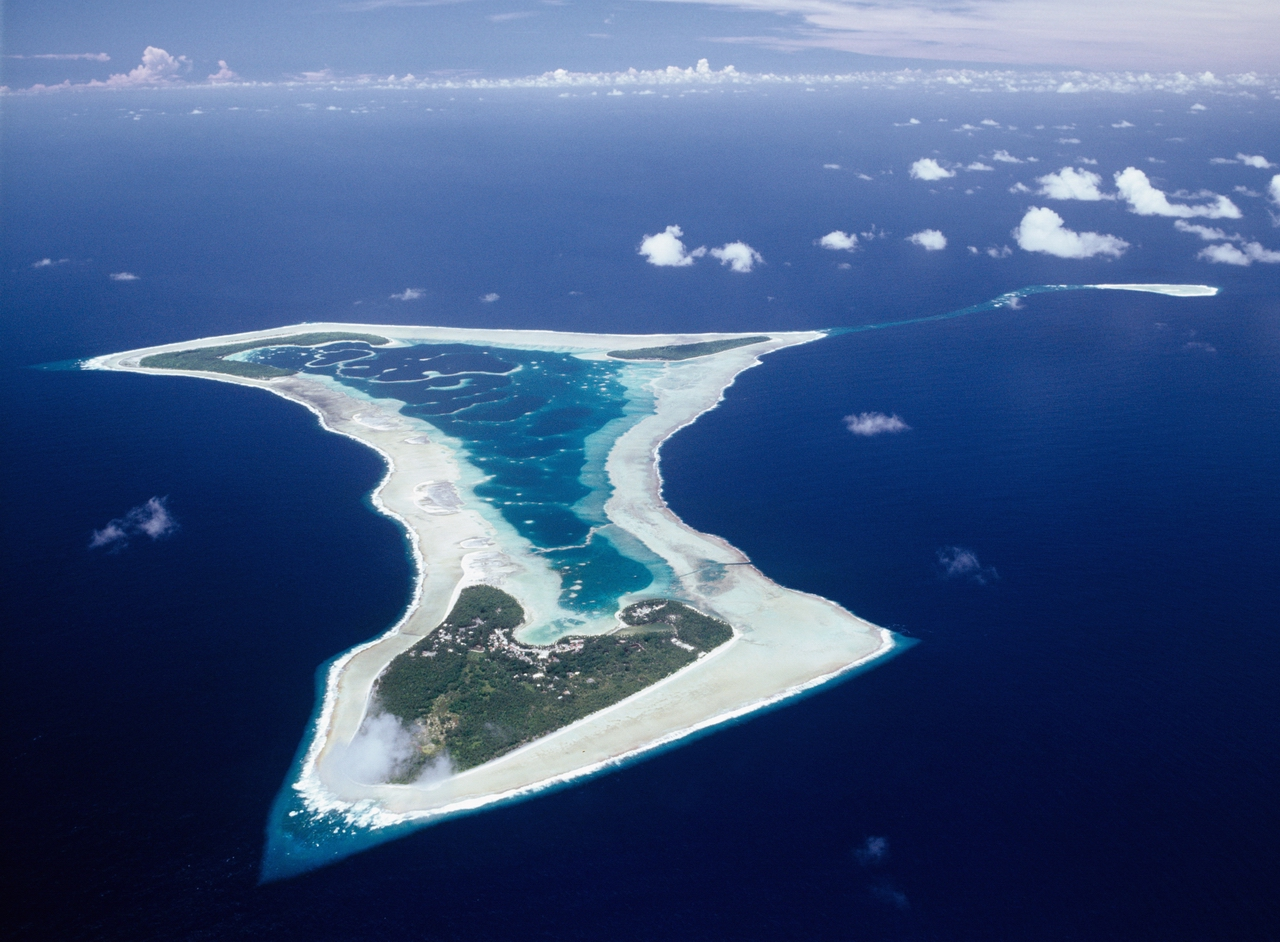
Aerial photograph of Pukapuka

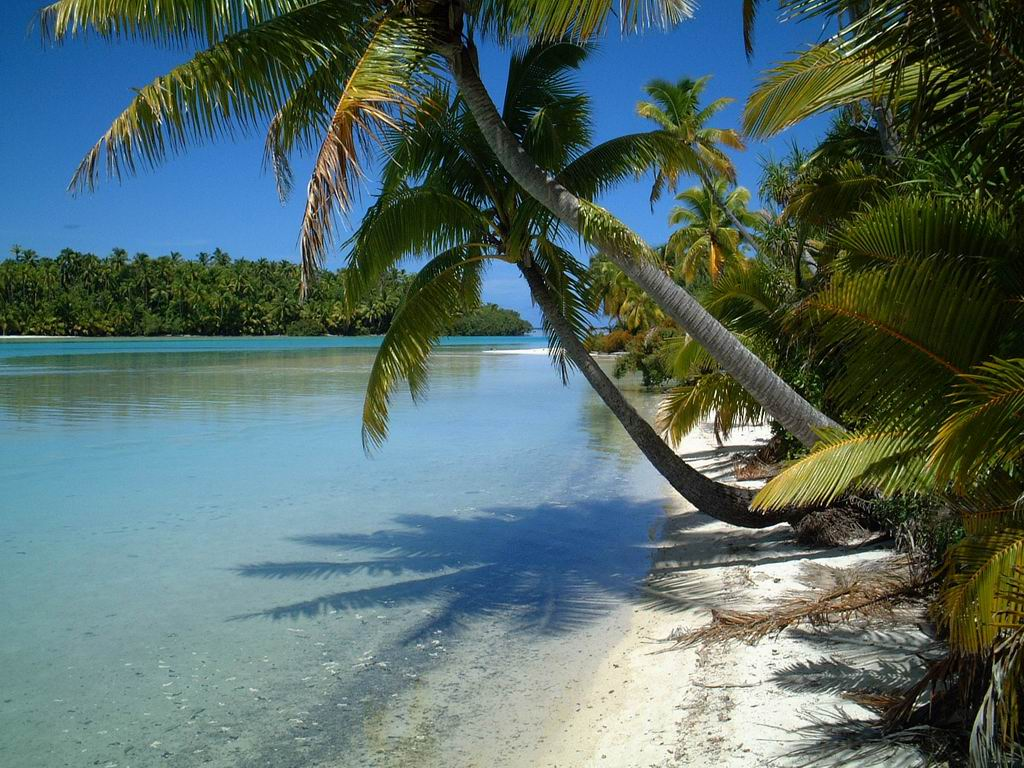
Tapuaetai (One Foot Island) at Aitutaki

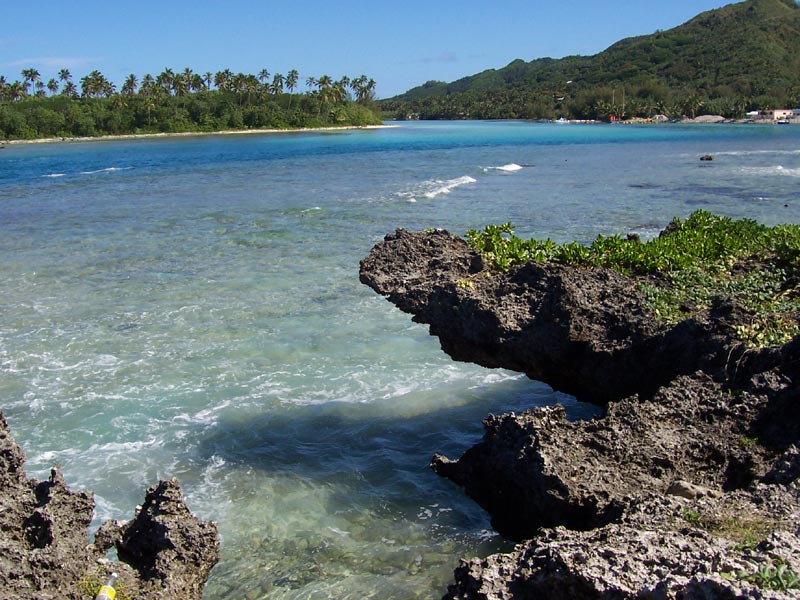
Rock outcrop on Rarotonga

=== Biodiversity ===
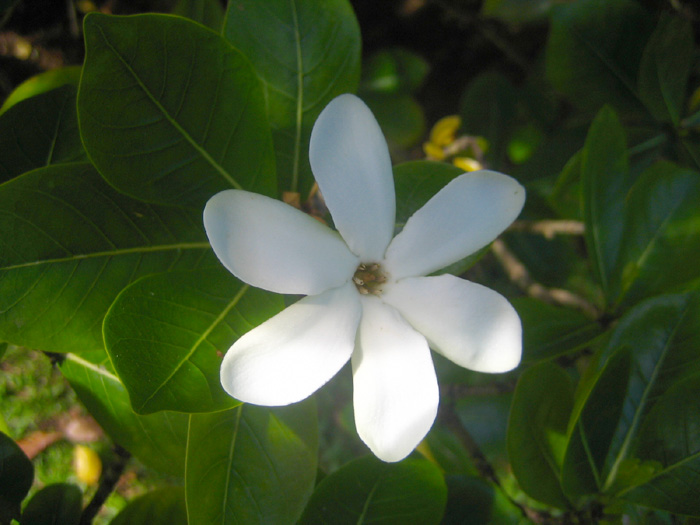
Tiare māori, the national flower of the Cook Islands

The national flower of the Cook Islands is the tiare māori or tiale māoli (Penrhyn, Nassau, Pukapuka).

The Cook Islands have a large population of non-native ship rat and kiore toka (Polynesian rat). The rats have dramatically reduced the bird population on the islands.

In April 2007, 27 Kuhl's lorikeets were re-introduced to Atiu from Rimatara. Fossil and oral traditions indicate that the species was formerly on at least five islands of the southern group. Excessive exploitation for its red feathers is the most likely reason for the species' extinction in the Cook Islands.

The islands' surrounding waters are the home of the peppermint angelfish. While they are common, due to the difficulty of harvesting them, they are one of the most expensive marine aquarium fish with a price of US$30,000.

== Politics and foreign relations ==
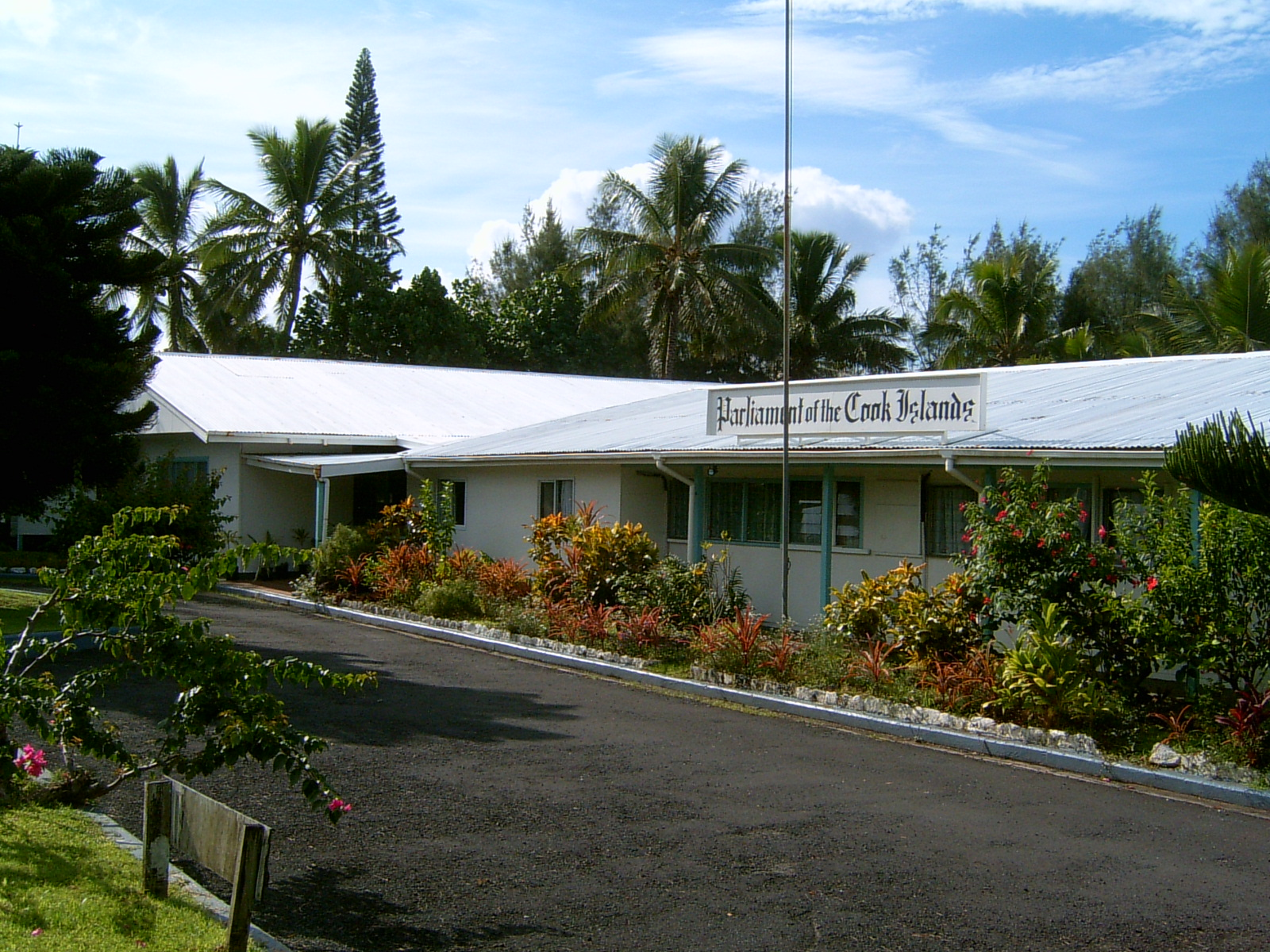
The parliament building of the Cook Islands, formerly a hotel

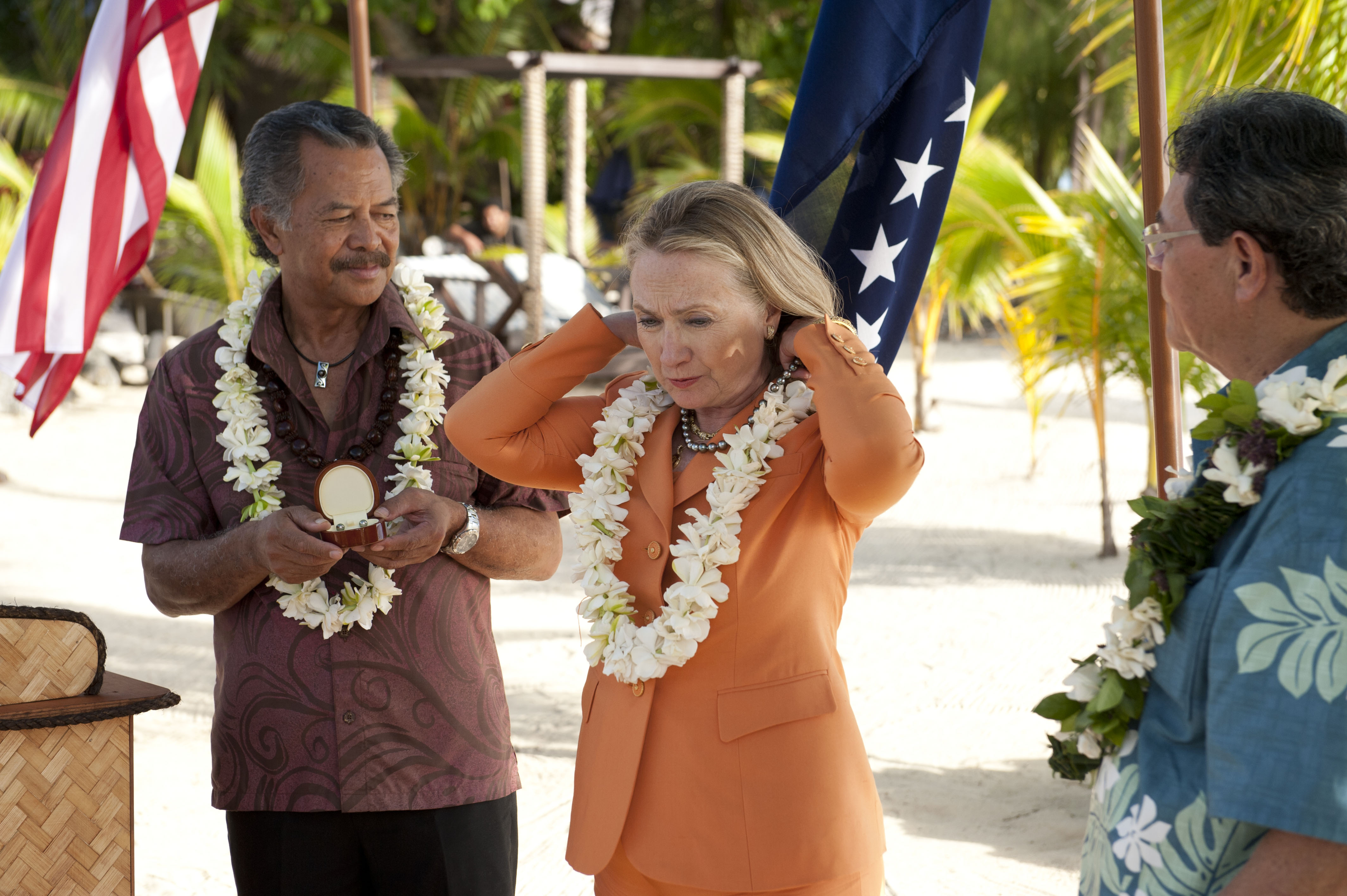
Prime Minister Henry Puna with U.S. secretary of state Hillary Clinton in Rarotonga, 31 August 2012

The Cook Islands are a representative democracy with a parliamentary system in an associated state relationship with New Zealand. Executive power is exercised by the government, with the Prime Minister as head of government. Legislative power is vested in both the government and the Parliament of the Cook Islands. While the country is de jure unicameral, there are two legislative bodies with the House of Ariki acting as a de facto upper house.

There is a multi-party system. The judiciary is independent of the executive and the legislature. The head of state is the King of New Zealand, who is represented in the Cook Islands by the King's Representative.

The islands are self-governing in "free association" with New Zealand. Under the Cook Islands constitution, New Zealand cannot pass laws for the Cook Islands. Rarotonga has its own foreign service and diplomatic network. Cook Islands nationals have the right to become citizens of New Zealand and can receive New Zealand government services when in New Zealand, but the reverse is not true; New Zealand citizens are not Cook Islands nationals. Despite this, as of 2018, the Cook Islands had diplomatic relations in its own name with 52 other countries. The Cook Islands is not a United Nations member state, but, along with Niue, has had their "full treaty-making capacity" recognised by the United Nations Secretariat, and is a full member of the World Health Organization (WHO), UNESCO, the International Civil Aviation Organization, the International Maritime Organization and the UN Food and Agriculture Organization, all UN specialised agencies, and is an associate member of the United Nations Economic and Social Commission for Asia and the Pacific (UNESCAP) and a Member of the Assembly of States of the International Criminal Court.

On 11 June 1980, the United States signed a treaty with the Cook Islands specifying the maritime border between the Cook Islands and American Samoa and also relinquishing any American claims to Penrhyn, Pukapuka, Manihiki, and Rakahanga. In 1990 the Cook Islands and France signed a treaty that delimited the boundary between the Cook Islands and French Polynesia. In late August 2012, United States Secretary of State Hillary Clinton visited the islands. In 2017, the Cook Islands signed the UN Treaty on the Prohibition of Nuclear Weapons. On 25 September 2023, the Cook Islands and the United States of America established diplomatic relations under the leadership of Prime Minister Mark Brown at a ceremony in Washington, DC.

In 2024, the Cook Islands' efforts to join the Commonwealth of Nations as a full member were "ongoing" but, despite this, the government was unable to secure an invitation to attend the 2024 Commonwealth Heads of Government Meeting in Samoa.

In 2025, prime minister Mark Brown said that the Cook Islands did not meet the requirements for UN membership and foreign minister Tingika Elikana said that any decision to join the UN would require a referendum and re-evaluation of the relationship with New Zealand. Brown also confirmed that at the Commonwealth of Nations the Cook Islands is considered to be represented by the Realm of New Zealand, meaning that they would not have their own separate representation unless they become fully sovereign. Additionally, in response to a push to introduce Cook Island passports and agreements made with China, a spokesperson for New Zealand foreign minister Winston Peters stated, "Unlike Samoa, Tonga and Tuvalu, the Cook Islands is not a fully independent and sovereign state", unless its status and relationship with New Zealand are changed by referendum.

=== Defence and police ===
The Cook Islands Police Service polices the waters, and shares responsibility for defence with New Zealand, in consultation with the Cook Islands Government and at its request. The total offshore EEZ is about 2 million square kilometres. Vessels of the Royal New Zealand Navy can be employed for this task including its Protector-class offshore patrol vessels. These naval forces may also be supported by Royal New Zealand Air Force aircraft, including P-8 Poseidons. However, these forces are limited in size and in 2023 were described by the Government as "not in a fit state" to respond to regional challenges. New Zealand's subsequently announced "Defence Policy and Strategy Statement" noted that shaping the security environment, "focusing in particular on supporting security in and for the Pacific" would receive enhanced attention.

The Cook Islands Police Service is the police force of the Cook Islands. The Maritime Wing of the Police Service exercises sovereignty over the nation's EEZ. Vessels have included a Pacific-class patrol boat, CIPPB Te Kukupa commissioned in May 1989 which received a re-fit in 2015 but was withdrawn from service and replaced by a larger and more capable Guardian-class patrol boat, CIPPB Te Kukupa II, which entered service in 2022. Cook Islands has its own customs regulations.

=== Human rights ===
Formerly, male homosexuality was de jure illegal in the Cook Islands and was punishable by a maximum term of seven years imprisonment; however, the law was never enforced. In 2023, legislation was passed which legalised homosexuality.

=== Local government ===
There are island councils, each headed by a mayor, on all of the inhabited outer islands (Outer Islands Local Government Act 1987 with amendments up to 2004, and Palmerston Island Local Government Act 1993) except Nassau, which is governed by Pukapuka (Suwarrow, with only one caretaker living on the island, also governed by Pukapuka, is not counted with the inhabited islands in this context).

Map of the islands of Cook Islands

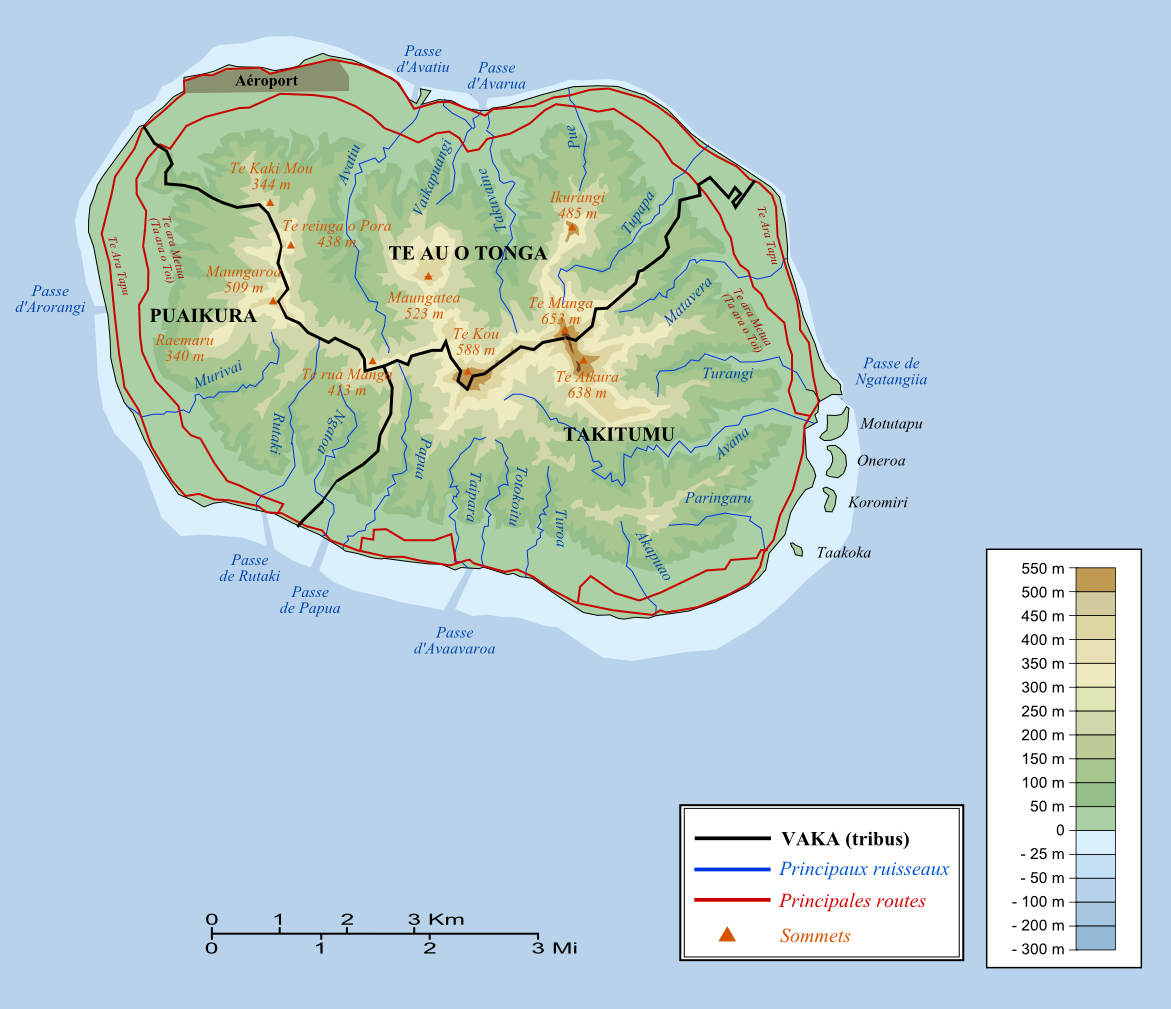
Vaka councils of Rarotonga, 1997–2008

The ten island councils in the outer islands
Aitutaki (including uninhabited Manuae)
Atiu (including uninhabited Takutea)
Mangaia
Manihiki
Mauke
Mitiaro
Palmerston
Penrhyn
Pukapuka (including Nassau and Suwarrow)
Rakahanga

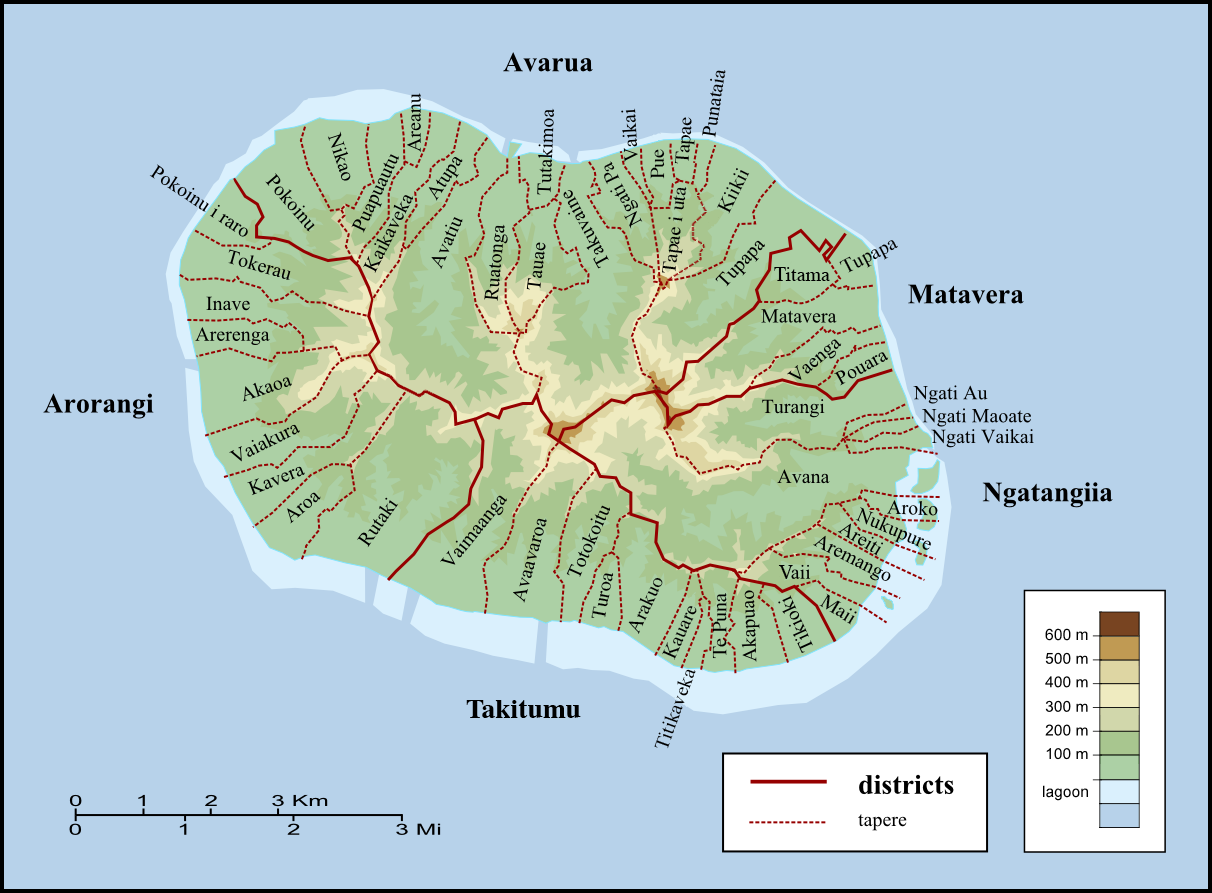
The five districts of Rarotonga, subdivided into 54 traditional tapere

Three vaka councils headed by mayors were established on Rarotonga by the Rarotonga Local Government Act 1997, then abolished in February 2008, despite much controversy.

Vaka councils of Rarotonga, 1997–2008
Vaka	Districts
Puaikura	Arorangi
Takitumu	Matavera, Ngatangiia, Takitumu
Te-Au-O-Tonga	Equivalent to Avarua, the country's capital

On the lowest level, there are village committees. Nassau, which is governed by Pukapuka, has an island committee (Nassau Island Committee), which advises the Pukapuka Island Council on matters concerning its own island.

== Economy ==
The economy is strongly affected by geography. It is isolated from foreign markets, and has some inadequate infrastructure; it lacks major natural resources except for significant seabed critical minerals, has limited manufacturing and suffers moderately from natural disasters. Tourism provides the economic base that makes up approximately 67.5% of GDP. Additionally, the economy is supported by foreign aid, largely from New Zealand. China has also contributed foreign aid, which has resulted in, among other projects, the Police Headquarters building.

Tourist arrivals of 2024 in %

Rarotonga International Airport is the only airport that receives international flights. Eight airports on other islands provide local or charter services. Only Rarotonga and Aitutaki Airport have paved runways; the others have coral runways. The main seaport and the only one where container ships can berth is Rarotonga's port of Avatiu. At the port of Arutanga at Aitutaki, ships anchor outside the reef and cargo is carried to the dock by lighter barge.

Since about 1989, the Cook Islands has specialised in so-called asset protection trusts through its International Trusts Act. This allows investors to shelter assets from the reach of creditors and legal authorities. According to The New York Times, the Cooks have "laws devised to protect foreigners' assets from legal claims in their home countries", which were apparently crafted specifically to thwart the reach of American justice; creditors must travel to the Cook Islands and argue their cases under Cooks law, often at prohibitive expense. Unlike other foreign jurisdictions such as the British Virgin Islands, the Cayman Islands and Switzerland, the Cooks "generally disregard foreign court orders" and do not require that bank accounts, real estate, or other assets protected from scrutiny (it is illegal to disclose names or any information about Cooks trusts) be physically located within the archipelago. Taxes on trusts and trust employees account for some 8% of the Cook Islands economy, behind tourism but ahead of fishing.

In 2019, the Cook Islands passed the Sea Bed Minerals (SBM) Act to manage the seabed minerals located in the Exclusive Economic Zone surrounding the islands. In 2022, the SBMA granted three exploration licences for polymetallic nodules to three private companies, including one co-owned by the government. In 2025, the Cook Islands signed seabed mineral exploration agreements with the United States and China.

== Demographics ==
Population pyramid 2011
%	Males	Age	Females	%
0.5		80+		0.6
0.7		75–79		0.9
1.4		70–74		1.4
1.9		65–69		1.8
2.2		60–64		2.0
2.4		55–59		2.4
3.0		50–54		3.0
3.6		45–49		3.6
3.4		40–44		3.6
3.1		35–39		3.6
3.0		30–34		3.3
3.3		25–29		3.8
3.4		20–24		3.7
4.3		15–19		4.1
4.5		10–14		4.0
4.3		5–9		4.3
4.5		0–4		4.4
- Source: unstats.un.org

Births and deaths

Year	Population	Live births	Deaths	Natural increase	Crude birth rate	Crude death rate	Rate of natural increase
2009	22,600	284	72	212	12.6	3.2	9.4
2010	23,700	286	92	194	12.1	3.9	8.2
2011	14,974	262	72	190	13.6	3.7	9.8
2012	19,500	259	104	155	13.3	5.3	7.9
2013	18,600	256	115	141	13.8	6.2	7.6
2014	18,600	204	113	91	11.0	6.1	4.9
2015	18,400	205	102	103	11.0	5.5	5.5
2016	17,434	242	87	155	12.5	4.5	8
2017	19,500	222	93	129	11.4	4.8	6.6
2018	18,600	232	121	111	12.5	6.5	6
2019	20,200	225	105	120	11.1	5.2	5.9
2020							

=== Religion ===
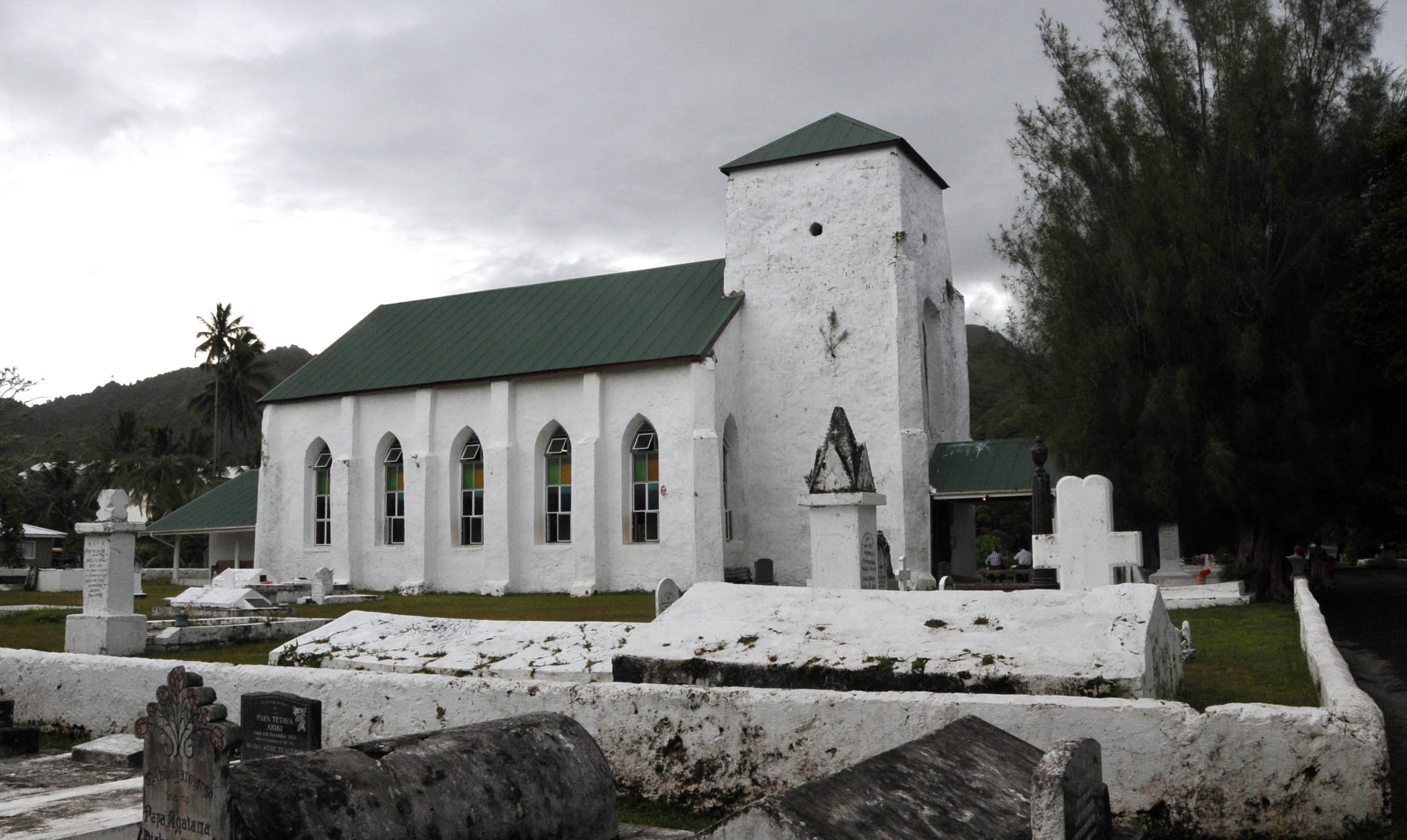
CICC church in Avarua, Rarotonga

In the Cook Islands, there is separation between the church and the state, and most of the population is Christian.

Various Protestant groups account for 62.8% of the believers, the most followed denomination being the Cook Islands Christian Church with 49.1%. Other Protestant Christian groups include Seventh-day Adventist 7.9%, Assemblies of God 3.7% and Apostolic Church 2.1%. The main non-Protestant group are Catholics, with 17% of the population. The Church of Jesus Christ of Latter-day Saints makes up 4.4%. "None" or "unspecified" account for 15.6% of the population.

== Culture ==
=== Language ===
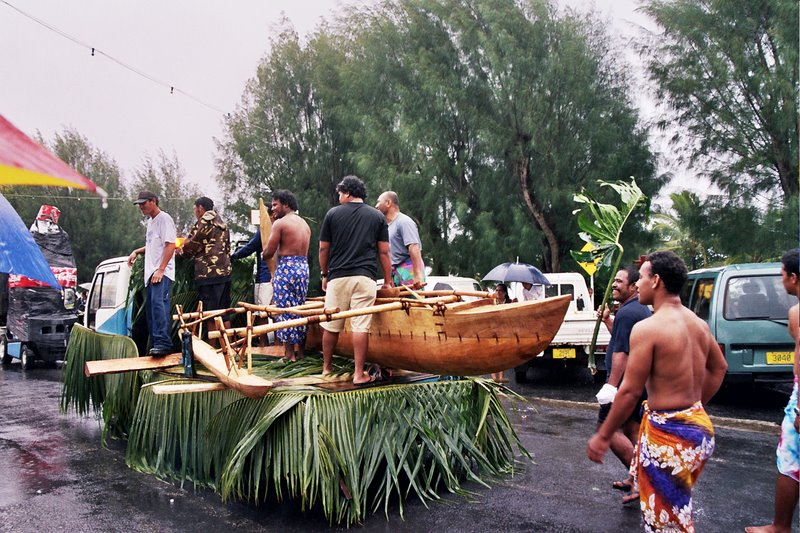
Float parade during the annual Maeva Nui celebrations

The languages of the Cook Islands include English, Cook Islands Māori (or "Rarotongan"), and Pukapukan. Dialects of Cook Islands Māori include Penrhyn; Rakahanga-Manihiki; the Ngaputoru dialect of Atiu, Mitiaro, and Mauke; the Aitutaki dialect; and the Mangaian dialect. Cook Islands Māori and its dialectic variants are closely related to both Tahitian and to New Zealand Māori. Pukapukan is considered closely related to the Samoan language. English and Cook Islands Māori are official languages of the Cook Islands, per the Te Reo Maori Act. The legal definition of Cook Islands Māori includes Pukapukan.

=== Art ===
==== Traditional arts ====
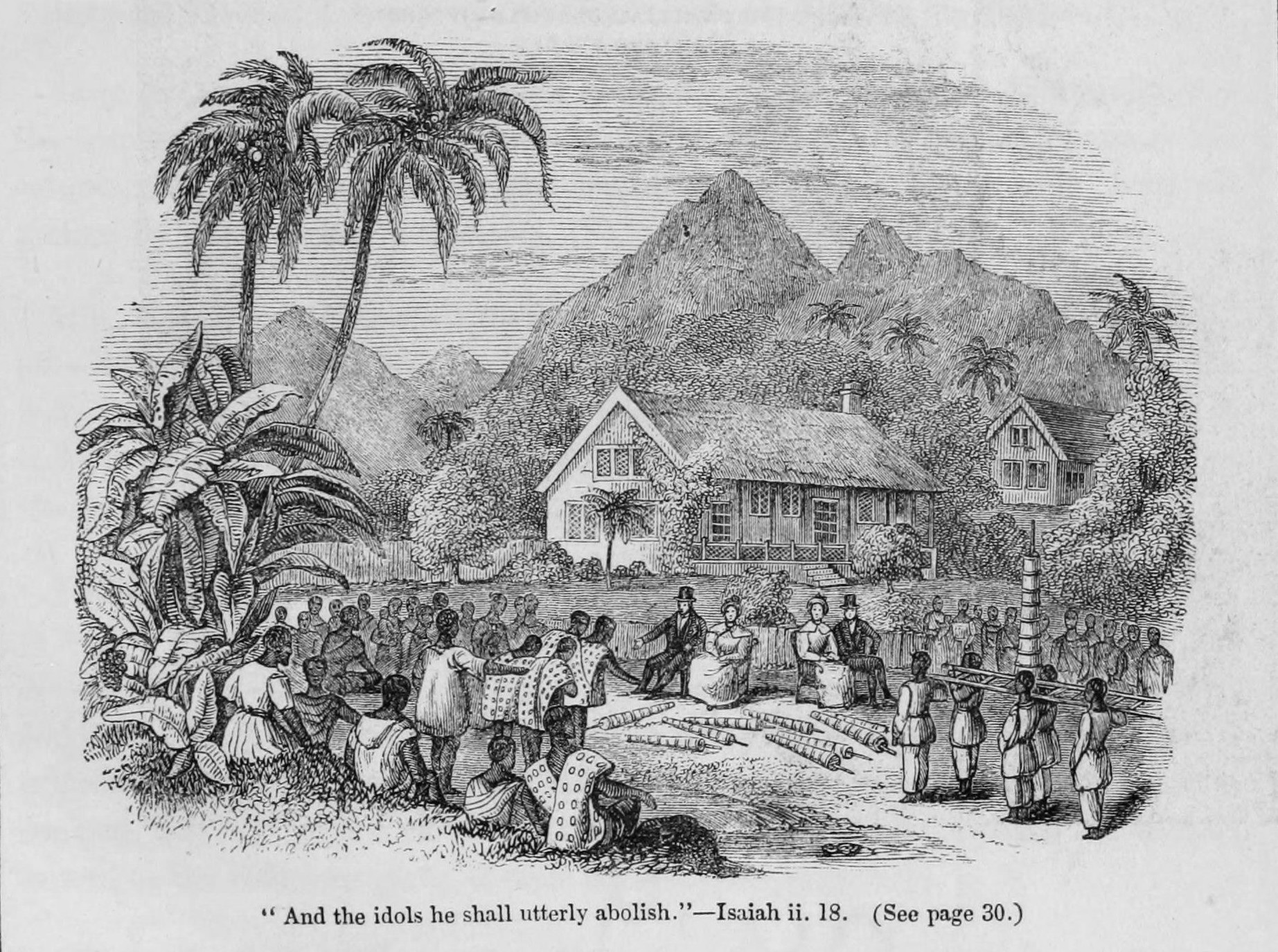
Confiscation and destruction of idol gods by European missionaries in Rarotonga, 1837

Woodcarving is a common art form in the Cook Islands. The proximity of islands in the southern group helped produce a homogeneous style of carving but that had special developments in each island. Rarotonga is known for its fisherman's gods and staff-gods, Atiu for its wooden seats, Mitiaro, Mauke and Atiu for mace and slab gods and Mangaia for its ceremonial adzes. Most of the original wood carvings were either spirited away by early European collectors or were burned in large numbers by missionaries. Today, carving is no longer the major art form with the same spiritual and cultural emphasis given to it by the Maori in New Zealand. However, there are continual efforts to interest young people in their heritage and some good work is being turned out under the guidance of older carvers. Atiu, in particular, has a strong tradition of crafts both in carving and local fibre arts such as tapa. Mangaia is the source of many fine adzes carved in a distinctive, idiosyncratic style with the so-called double-k design. Mangaia also produces food pounders carved from the heavy calcite found in its extensive limestone caves.

The outer islands produce traditional weaving of mats, basketware and hats. Particularly fine examples of rito hats are worn by women to church. They are made from the uncurled immature fibre of the coconut palm and are of very high quality. The Polynesian equivalent of Panama hats, they are highly valued and are keenly sought by Polynesian visitors from Tahiti. Often, they are decorated with hatbands made of minuscule pupu shells that are painted and stitched on by hand. Although pupu are found on other islands the collection and use of them in decorative work has become a speciality of Mangaia. The weaving of rito is a speciality of the northern islands, Manihiki, Rakahanga and Penrhyn.

A major art form in the Cook Islands is tivaevae. This is, in essence, the art of handmade Island scenery patchwork quilts. Introduced by the wives of missionaries in the 19th century, the craft grew into a communal activity, which is probably one of the main reasons for its popularity.

==== Contemporary art ====
The Cook Islands has produced internationally recognised contemporary artists, especially from the main island of Rarotonga. Artists include painter (and photographer) Mahiriki Tangaroa, sculptors Eruera (Ted) Nia (originally a film maker) and master carver Mike Tavioni, painter (and Polynesian tattoo enthusiast) Upoko'ina Ian George, Aitutakian-born painter Tim Manavaroa Buchanan, Loretta Reynolds, Judith Kunzlé, Joan Gragg, Kay George (who is also known for her fabric designs), Apii Rongo, Varu Samuel, and multi-media, installation and community-project artist Ani O'Neill, all of whom currently live on Rarotonga. Atiuan-based Andrea Eimke is an artist who works in the medium of tapa and other textiles, and also co-authored the book Tivaivai – The Social Fabric of the Cook Islands with British academic Susanne Kuechler. Many of these artists have studied at university art schools in New Zealand and continue to enjoy close links with the New Zealand art scene.

New Zealand-based Cook Islander artists include Michel Tuffery, print-maker David Teata, Richard Shortland Cooper, Nina Oberg Humphries, Sylvia Marsters and Jim Vivieaere.

Bergman Gallery (formerly BCA Gallery) is the main commercial dealer gallery in the Cook Islands, situated in Rarotonga, and represents Cook Islands artists such as Sylvia Marsters, Mahiriki Tangaroa, Nina Oberg Humphries, Joan Gragg and Tungane Broadbent. The Art Studio Gallery in Arorangi was run by Ian George and Kay George and is now Beluga Cafe. There is also Gallery Tavioni and Vananga run by Mike Tavioni, and the Cook Islands National Museum exhibits art.

=== Music ===
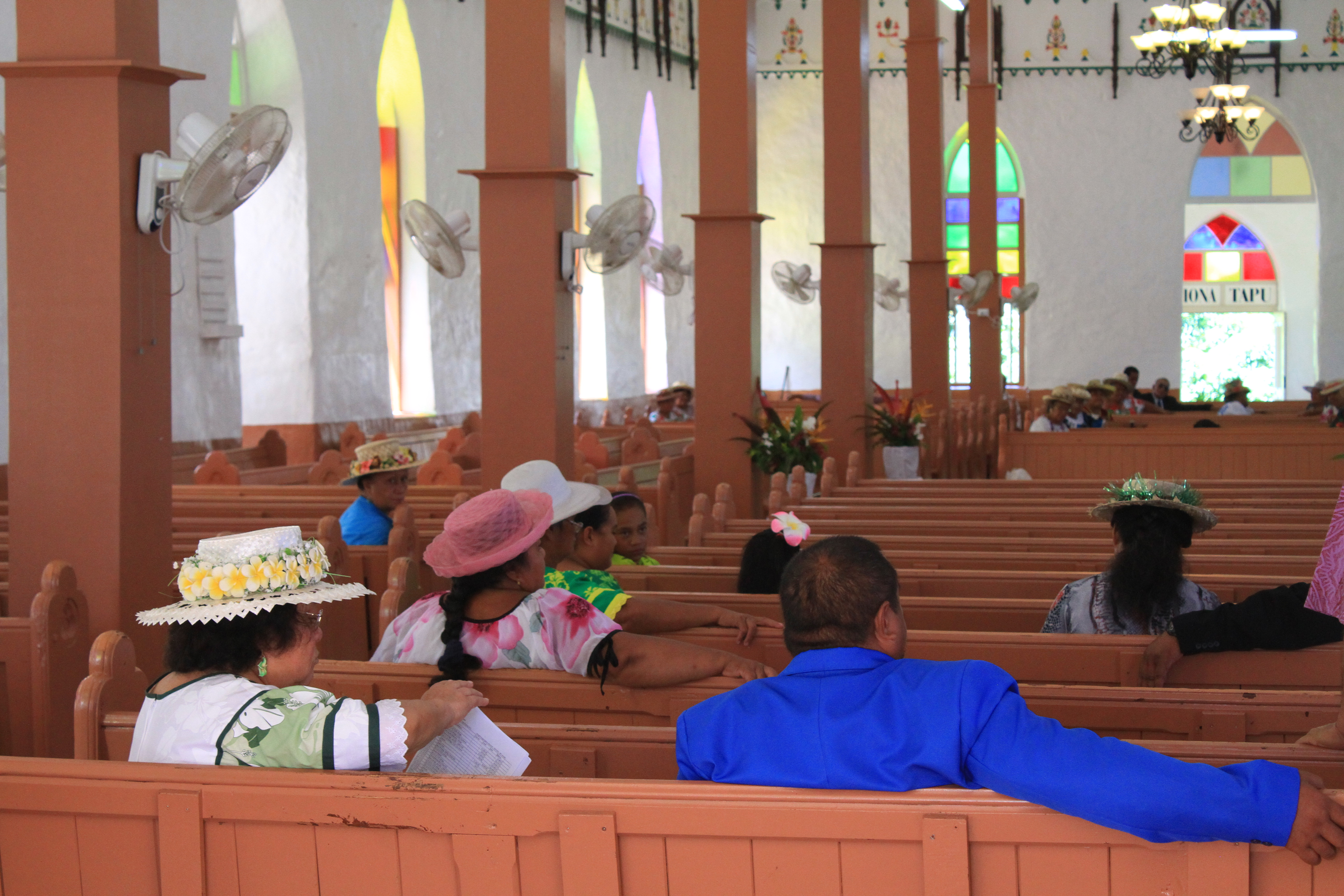
A CICC congregationalist church

Music in the Cook Islands is varied, with Christian songs being quite popular, but traditional dancing and songs in Cook Islands Maori and Pukapukan remain popular.

=== Sport ===
The Cook Islands have competed at the Summer Olympic Games since 1988, without winning a medal. Rugby league is the most popular sport and the national sport of the country.

=== Newspapers ===
Newspapers in the Cook Islands are usually published in English with some articles in Cook Islands Māori. The Cook Islands News has been published since 1945, although it was owned by the government until 1989. Former newspapers include Te Akatauira, which was published from 1978 to 1980.

=== Television ===
Television was introduced on 25 December 1989. Cook Islands Television is a private (public until 1996) television station and is available in Rarotonga, where it competes with Vaka Television. The channel is owned by the Pitt Media Group which formerly included TV Niue. Other islands have their own television stations; subscription television is also available.

== See also ==
- Index of Cook Islands–related articles
- List of Cook Islanders
- Outline of the Cook Islands
