= Flora of the Cook Islands =

- Cyrtandra lillianae, a plant species native to Rarotonga

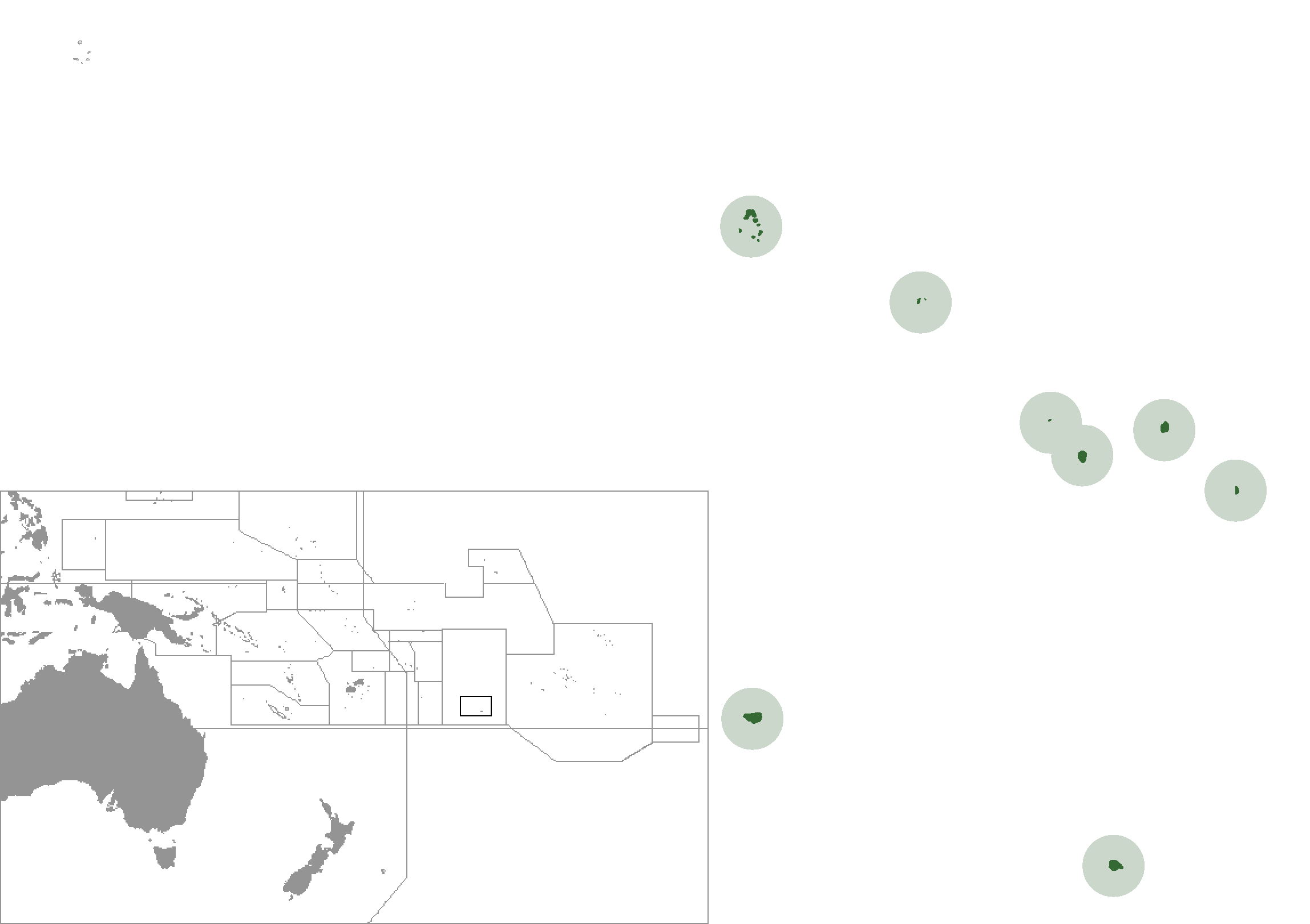

Ecology
- Realm: Oceania
- Biome: Tropical moist forests

The flora of the Cook Islands includes 104 native ferns and 187 flowering plants, with 26 of them being endemic. There are also 62 moss species, as well as 11 liverwort species. There are two main island groups, the Southern Cook Islands and the Northern Cook Islands. The two chains are geographically different, despite both being of volcanic origin. There is a diverse range of habitats from littoral forests along coastlines to montane and cloud forests at higher elevations. A unique uplifted coral reef limestone is found on some of the islands. Vegetation on this substrate is well preserved, as the rugged, uneven terrain is unsuitable for agriculture or human settlement.

Many plants of the islands are highly threatened to due human activity and other natural causes. Eradication programmes target invasive species such as the giant reed. Conservation efforts focus on the evaluation and propagation of native plant species, while also planting native coastal trees to reduce land erosion. There are plants used for medicines, tools, and everyday items, and plants that hold cultural importance.

== Geography ==
Te Manga, the highest peak on Rarotonga

The Cook Islands are an island group made up of 15 islands and atolls, and are of volcanic origin. There are two island groups, the Northern Cook Islands, and the Southern Cook Islands. All islands spread out across the country are collectively called Pa Enua. Rarotonga is the largest and most populous island in the southern chain of the Cook Islands. Situated in the South Pacific approximately 3,400 kilometres northeast of New Zealand, Rarotonga has a rugged, mountainous interior that rises to 652 m (2,139 ft) at Te Manga, the highest point in the country.

The Northern Cook Islands group consists mostly of atolls with a central lagoon surrounded by small areas of land. They form a rough, upside-down triangle with Penrhyn in the northeast, Pukapuka in the northwest, and Suwarrow in the south. A vast expanse of the Pacific Ocean separates the northern atolls from the southern group. The closest southern neighbour is Palmerston Island, located 500 km (310 mi) south of Suwarrow. The northern group has an equatorial climate, and gets higher rainfall, ranging between 1,900 and 2,800 mm each year. The geology of the northern group is significantly older, with highly eroded and submerged volcanic cores, and plant diversity is low.

The Southern Cook Islands group including Rarotonga is more diverse. It includes two atolls, but is mostly volcanic islands with an outer coral reef and volcanic interiors. The highest levels of floral biodiversity are found on Rarotonga, followed by the raised coral islands of Mangaia, Atiu, Mauke, and Mitiaro. The southern group has a dry season from April to November and a more humid season from December to March and an average annual rainfall of about 2,000 mm.

The raised coral surrounding the central volcanic core of the southern islands is known as a makatea (named after Makatea island in the Tuamotus archipelago). It is a hard, rough limestone that was formed during multiple phases of uplift, raising the coral reef surface above sea level. The extent of uplift varies from a few metres on Mitiaro to around 100 m (330 ft) on Mangaia. Weathering of the exposed limestone leads to cracks, crevices and pinnacles. The exposed makatea is typically dry because the water table is deep below the surface.

== Plant diversity ==
The Cook Islands are a part of the Polynesia-Micronesia diversity hotspot, a region in the oceania biogeographic realm with high levels of endemism. The islands host a flora of 567 plants, 108 ferns and fern allies, and a total of 73 bryophyte species, 26 of them being endemic. There are no native gymnosperms, as all 4 recorded on the islands are introduced.

=== Flowering plants ===
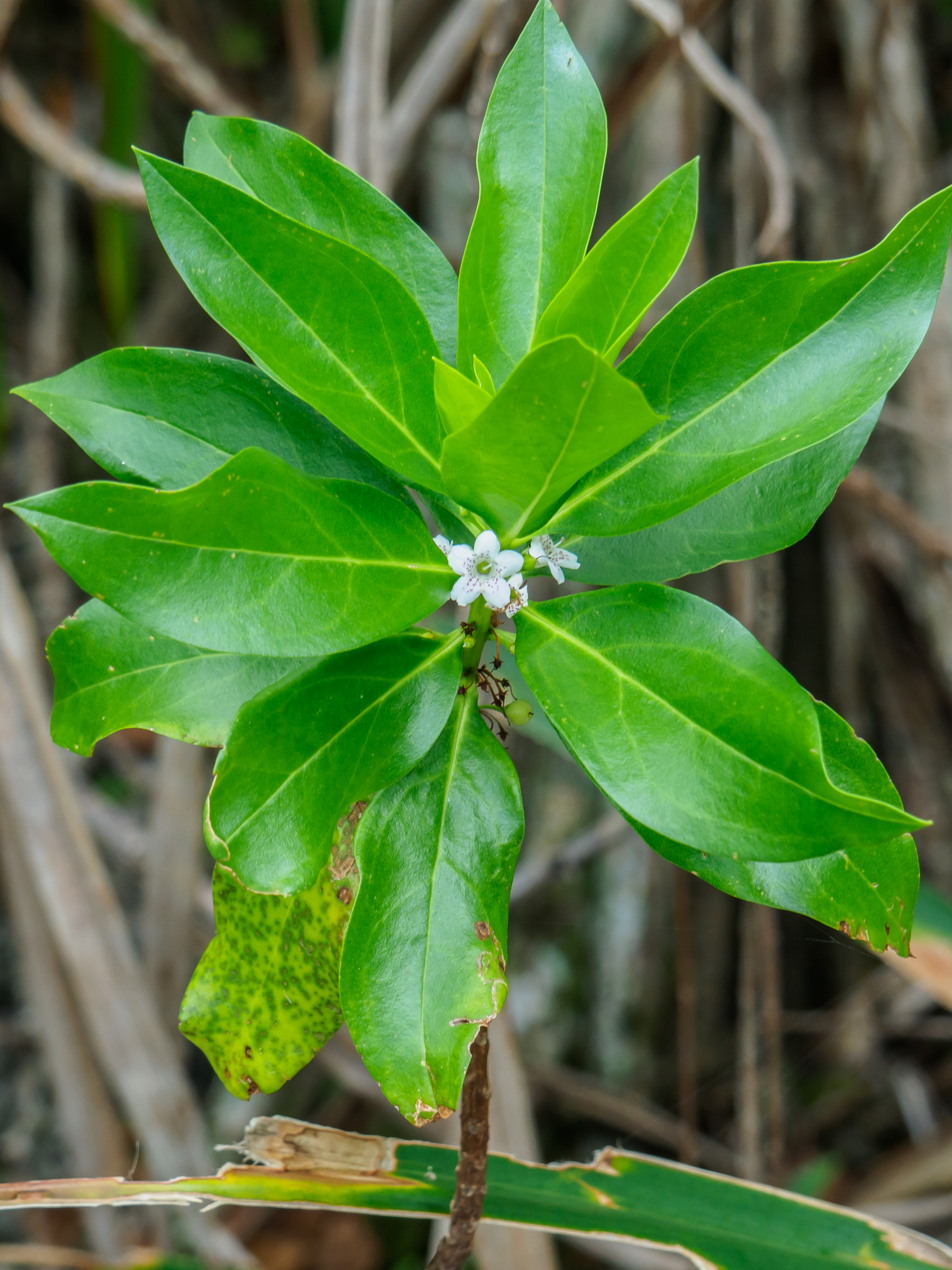
Myoporym wilderi, a plant endemic to Mangaia

There are 567 flowering plant species, but only 187 are indigenous. Some well known taxa include: Pipturus argenteus (orongā), Myrsine cheesemanii (ka‘ika makatea), Eugenia reinwardtiana, Melastoma denticulatum, Solanum nodiflorum (poroporo), and Morinda citrifolia (nono). Endemic plants include Rarotonga ground-orchid, Mitiaro daisy, Cook Islands Myrsine, Te Manga Cyrtandra, Rarotonga Peperomia, Rarotonga Sclerotheca, Makatea Geniostoma, Cook Islands Myoporum, Rarotonga Haloragis, Rarotonga Psychotria, Rarotonga garnotia-grass, Cook islands oak-leaf fern, cloud grass-fern, Freycinetia wilderi, and Lepidium makateanum.

=== Ferns and allies ===
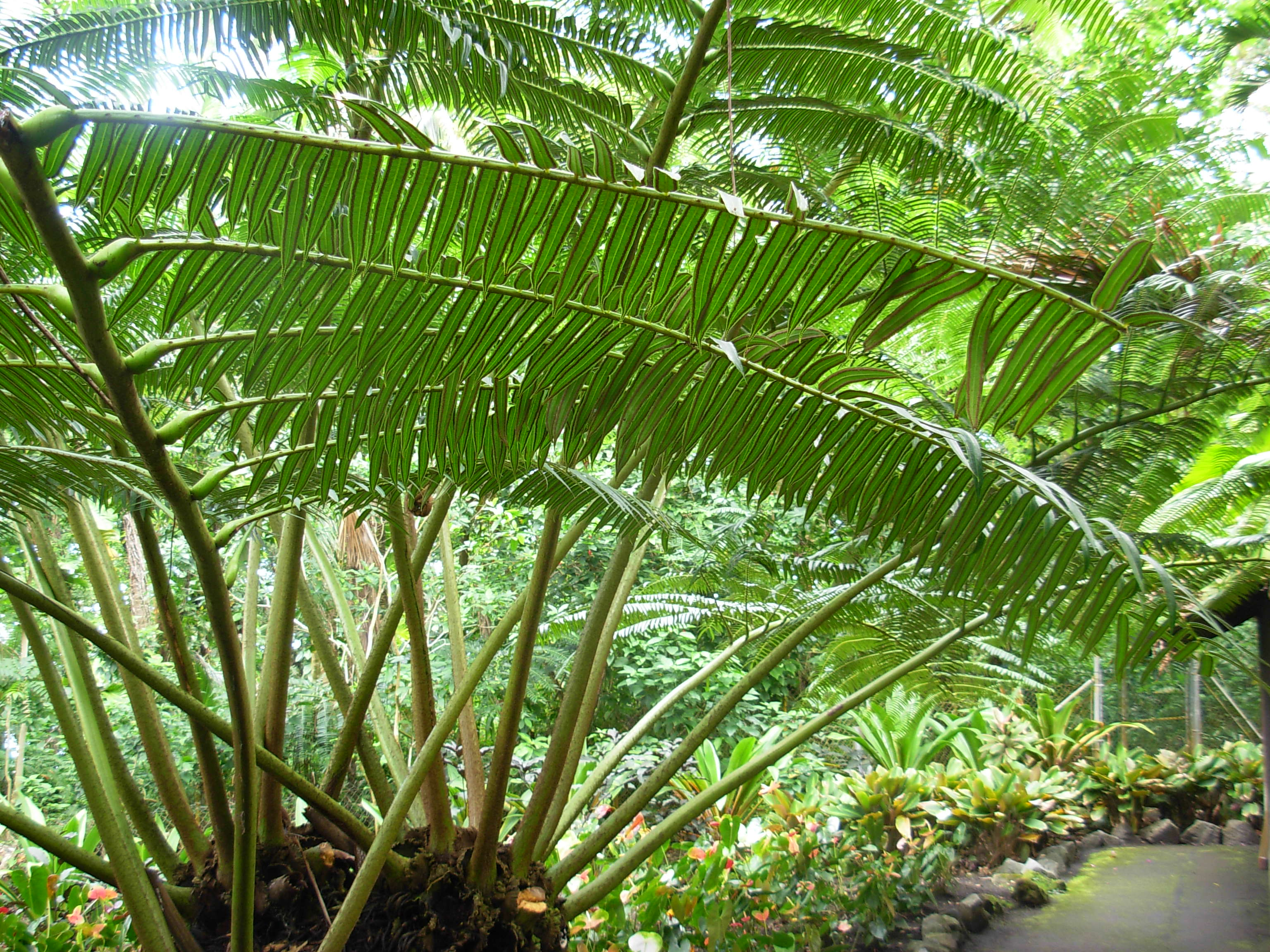
King Fern

There are 104 ferns that are native to the Cook Islands. Tree ferns are scattered throughout Rarotonga and are collectively known as panga. Some native species include: Psilotum complanatum (flat-whisk fern), Angiopteris evecta (king fern), Phlegmariurus squarrosus (rock clubmoss), Hypolepis tenuifolia, (soft ground fern), Ophioderma pendulum (ribbon fern), and Oreogrammitis cheesemanii (cloud grass fern). There are also some endemic fern species, such as Sphaeropteris parksiae, (Rarotonga tree fern) and Asplenium parksii.

=== Moss and liverworts ===
The bryophyte flora remains poorly documented. There are 62 species of moss and 9 known species of liverworts. moss spread across 9 moss families, and 11 genera. Liverworts make 6 families, and 8 genera. Native species include Dumortiera hirsuta, Fissidens zollingeri and Calymperes tenerum.

== Vegetation ==
There are four distinct types of vegetation in the islands: littoral forests, montane and cloud forests that thrive at high elevations, and the unique makatea forests (growing on uplifted coral reef limestone).

While its coastal and lowland plants have been largely cleared or replaced by introduced species, the rugged interior of Rarotonga remains largely untouched. A study of 19 upland forest sites revealed that over 92% of the trees are native, accounting for 95% of the total forest area.

== Littoral forests ==
The littoral zone along the coastlines of the Cook Islands, where not altered by human occupation, is dominated by tree species including Barringtonia asiatica, Calophyllum inophyllum, Cordia subcordata, Guettarda speciosa, Hernandia nymphaeifolia, Hibiscus tiliaceus, Pandanus tectorius, Pisonia grandis, Sophora tomentosa, Timonius polygamus, and Tournefortia argentea. The open areas are dominated by plants such as the Morinda citrifolia, Pemphis acidula, Pipturus argenteus, Scaevola taccada, Schleinitzia insularum, and Suriana maritima.

=== Montane forests ===
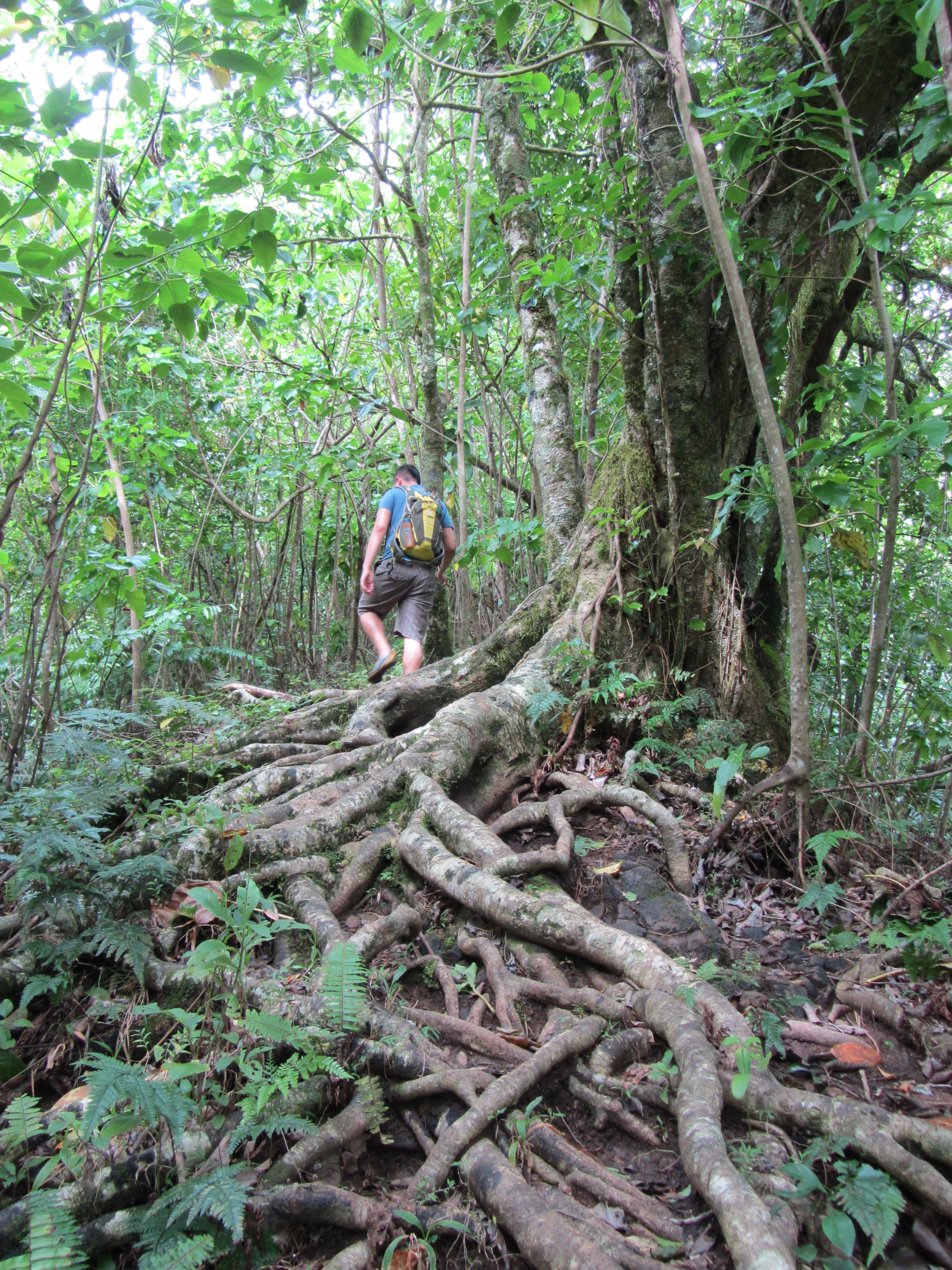
Homalium acuminatum

There are two primary types of relatively undisturbed montane rainforest found on Rarotonga.

Homalium forests are found on steep, mountain slopes. It is characterized by a dense, closed canopy standing 10 to 15 m (33 to 49 ft) tall. While the Homalium acuminatum is the dominant species, It is also dominanted by the Cyclophyllum barbatum, Elaeocarpus tonganus, and Ixora bracteata. Occasionally, species like Bischofia javanica, Macaranga harveyana, Pouteria grayana, Pterophylla affinis, and Terminalia glabrata can be found here as well.

Fagraea-Fitchia forest grow on rocky soils at elevations up to 500 m (1,600 ft). It is characterized by thick growth from large shrubs. The plants are dominated by Fagraea berteroana and Fitchia speciosa. The strong roots of these plants help stop soil erosion. They are dominated by plants such as the Alyxia elliptica, Cyclophyllum barbatum, Coprosma laevigata, Hibiscus tiliaceus,Meryta pauciflora, and Metrosideros collina.

The montane habitats of Rarotonga are one of the most intact forests of any tropical Pacific montane ecosystems. They are found in the steep, isolated interior of the largest of the Southern Cook Islands, and the vegetation is characterised by numerous endangered flora.

=== Cloud forests ===
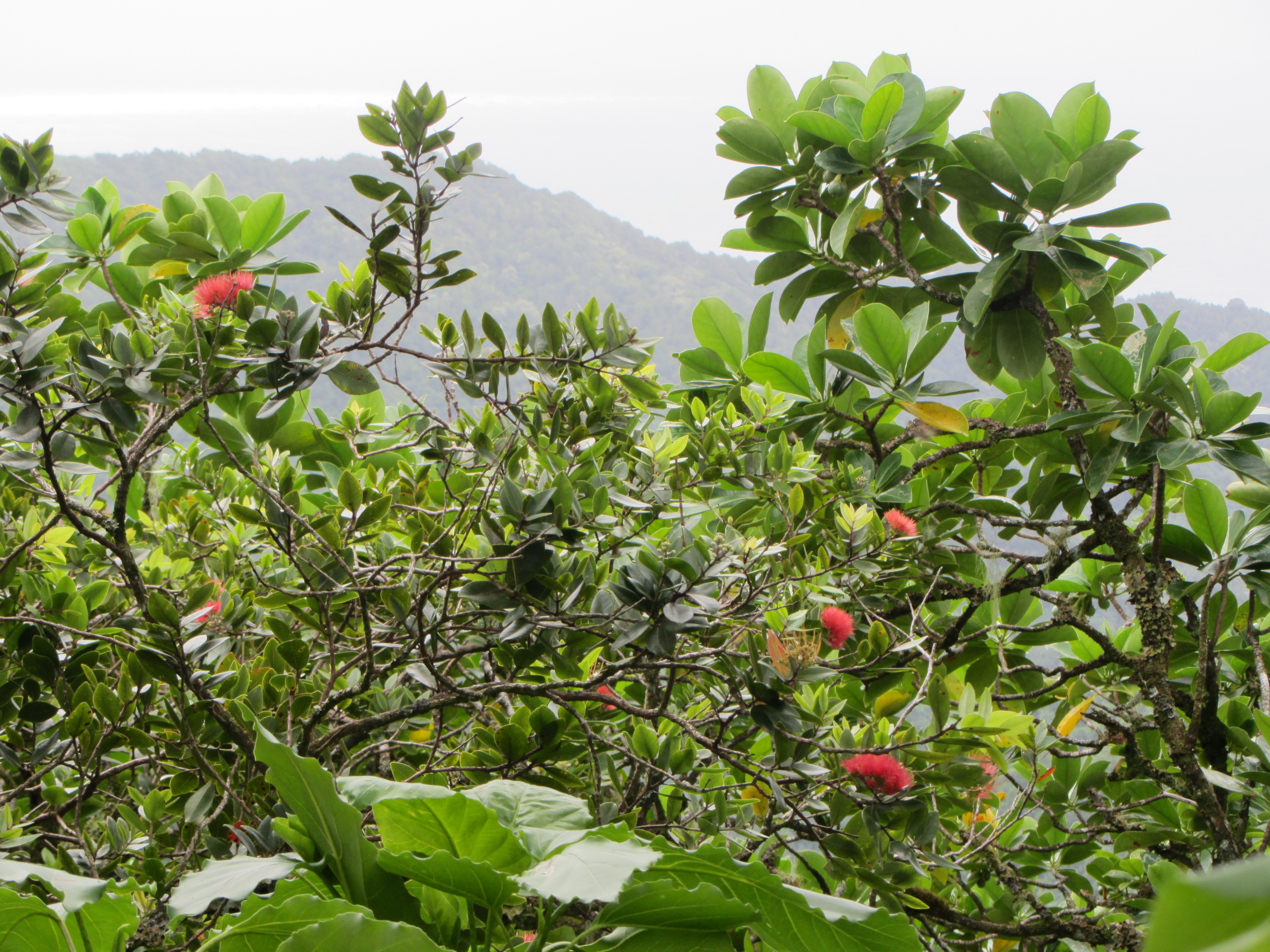
Metrosideros colina, one of the many trees of Rarotonga's cloud forests.

2015 survey listed 107 vascular plant species within the island's cloud forest habitats. Among these findings were several threatened endemic species, including the Te Manga Cyrtandra, Sclerotheca viridiflora), and Radiogrammitis cheesemanii. Cloud forest habitats also support a rich abundance of indigenous non-vascular flora. This includes a diverse variety of mosses, and liverworts. The vegetation is primarily dominated by Metrosidero collina, which reaches heights of up to 8 m (26 ft). In higher-elevation zones characterised by increased vapour, Ascarina diffusa becomes the dominant canopy species. Associated woody plants in this vegetation include Coprosma laevigata, Elaeocarpus floridanus, Fitchia speciosa, Geniostoma rarotongensis, Morinda forsteri, Pittosporum arborescens, Pterophylla affinis, Xylosma gracile, and Vaccinium cereum.

Rarotonga's cloud forests serve as a protective cover for steep and wet slopes, ensuring high water quality in headwater streams. The vegetation acts as a giant sponge that traps and slowly releases precipitation, thereby maintaining the reliability of the island's water supply.

=== Makatea forests ===
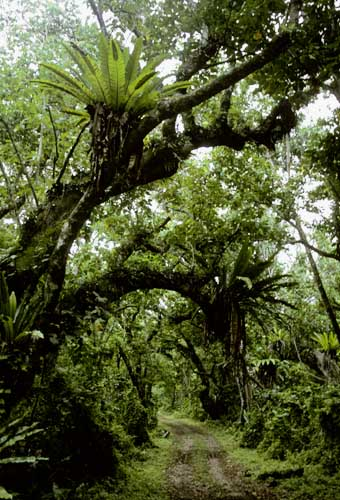
Limestone coral forest (makatea vegetation)

Vegetation growing on makatea (uplifted coral reef limestone) surfaces remain generally well preserved, as the terrain is unsuitable for agriculture or human settlement. This vegetation can be found on Atiu, Mangaia, Maʻuke, and Mitiʻaro. The Tuamotu Islands has an island (Makatea) that shares the coral limestone formation. The biodiversity of the flora scales progressively with inland distance.

The plant formation of the coastal makatea vegetation changes as it extends inland. Closer to the shore, the canopy is composed of a mix of the Cocos nucifera Hernandia nymphaeifolia, Hibiscus tiliaceus, and Pandanus tectorius, alongside occasional occurrences of Barringtonia asiatica and Casuarina equisetifolia. Further inland, the tree range changes to a vegetation dominated by Elaeocarpus tonganus, Guettarda speciosa, Pisonia grandis, Schleinitzia insularum, and Sophora tomentosa. Fronting the maritime edge of this forest is a vegetation zone primarily dominated by Scaevola taccada, occurring alongside Euphorbia atoto, Timonius polygamus, and Wollastonia biflora. Next to the coastline, Pemphis acidula forms a narrow line.

The inland makatea vegetation is dominated by nearly all woody plants present in the coastal makatea zone, with the notable exception of Pemphis acidula. This interior forest features an elevated canopy layer dominated by larger tree species, including Aleurites moluccana, Calophyllum inophyllum, and Hernandia moerenhoutiana. Additional woody plants documented within this inland vegetation include Cyclophyllum barbatum, Ficus prolixa, Ficus tinctoria, Glochidion, Morinda citrifolia, and Pipturus argenteus.

== Threats ==
Red flowers of the Spathodea campanulata tree, found on mountain slopes of Rarotonga.

Centuries of clearing for housing and farming have destroyed most lowland native vegetation across the islands. Pristine montane and cloud forests survive only on Rarotonga, while other native plants persist exclusively in the rugged, inaccessible terrain of the makatea islands. Additionally, the region is increasingly vulnerable to transboundary climate impacts, including intensified floods, droughts, tropical cyclones, and rising sea levels. Furthermore, invasive species, particularly black rats, cats, and mynah birds, pose a severe and ongoing threat to local biodiversity. Invasive weeds and shrubs that outcompete native plants include, Cardiospermum grandiflorum (balloon vine), Spathodea campanulata (African tulip tree), and Sphagneticola trilobata (wedelia). There are eradication programmes focusing on other invasive plants such as the Giant reed (Arundo donax) and Dodder (Cuscuta campestris) stopping them from destroying habitats of the native flora.

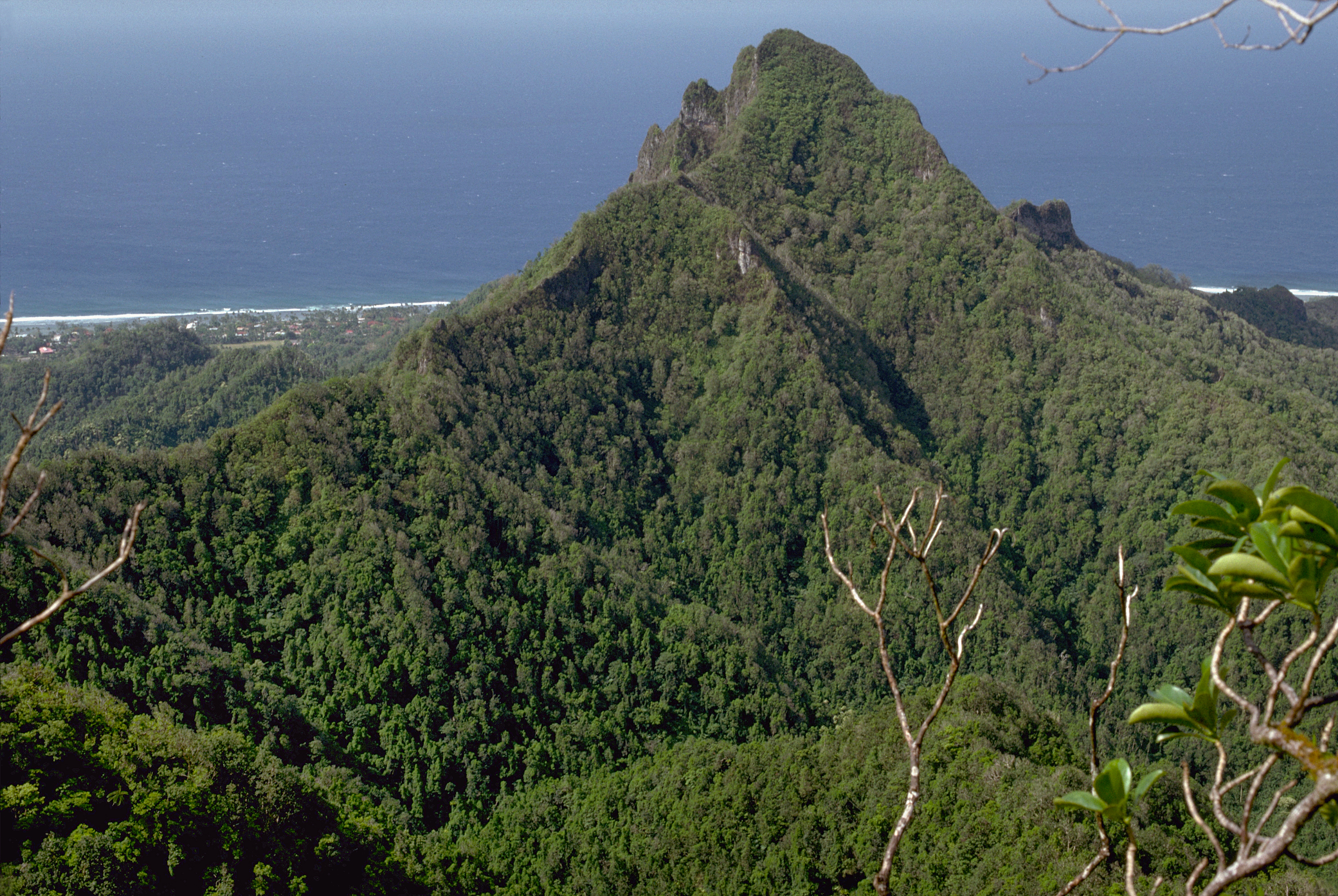
Ikurangi on Rarotonga in the 1980s

== Conservation ==
There are 18 protected areas in the Cook Islands covering a total of 1,796 ha (4,440 acres). These conservation areas encompass a diverse range of ecosystems, including nature reserves, and uninhabited atolls, most of them being established under traditional customary law rather than modern statutory legislation. The Cook Islands lie within in two different ecoregions for conservation planning purposes: the Cook Islands tropical moist forests that covers the Southern Cook Islands group, and the Central Polynesian Tropical Moist Forests - a large ecoregion that includes the Northern Cook Islands group but extends northwards to just south of Hawaii.

In July 2010, the Cook Islands Natural Heritage Trust initiated a research project to evaluate the population status of Rarotonga's rarest botanical species. Assisted by two New Zealand botanists, the field team conducted extensive surveys within the island's native forest habitats. The initial phase of the field assessment primarily recorded previously documented flora, identifying only a single unrecorded specimen. The objectives of the Rare Plants Project focused on surveying high-altitude terrain to identify populations of critically endangered endemic flora. Field operations specifically targeted the Te Manga Cyrtandra (Cyrtandra lillianae), the Rarotonga Cyrtandra (Cyrtandra rarotongensis), and the Rarotonga Sclerotheca (Sclerotheca viridiflora). The expedition also surveyed for a Pilea species (Pilea bisepala), a plant indigenous to both Rarotonga and Ra‘ivavae in the Austral Islands, where its population is severely threatened.

Muri Environment Care (MEC) is an environmental organization based in the Cook Islands that focuses on the conservation and propagation of native plant species. Established in its current capacity around 2024, the group conducts field expeditions across mountainous terrain and coastal remnants to harvest indigenous seeds and cuttings. Due to the near-total disappearance of native flora along the coast, conservationists must ascend into the mountainous interior to locate the species. These botanical specimens are cultivated in a dedicated conservation nursery situated behind Pa Ariki’s Takitumu Palace in Rarotonga. The initiative serves to preserve local biodiversity and support ecological restoration efforts within the region. To accommodate these species, nursery expansion plans include the construction of a specialized shade house and upgrades to the existing irrigation infrastructure. These modifications are designed to establish a controlled microclimate replicating the target species' native habitats. The initiative aims to preserve regional botanical heritage and increase localized biodiversity across associated projects.

Efforts to legally protect Rarotonga's cloud forests began in 1969 with a proposal for the 118 ha (290 acres) Te Manga Nature Reserve, which encompassed land above 400 m (1,300 ft) on Te Manga, Te Atukura, and Te Kou. The boundaries of the proposed reserve would include forests upstream of water intakes to secure critical water catchments and preserve complete ecological sequences from lowland to montane habitats.

A women's group Te Kumiti Au Vaine launched a restoration campaign to protect Cook Islands flora from climate-induced erosion. Their projects include preserving Rarotonga's cloud forests, and initiatives in the Northern Group atolls of Manihiki and Rakahanga. There, the project supplied 1,500 seedling bags to propagate native coastal trees, establishing natural defences against shoreline erosion through youth-led school planting programs coordinated by local environmental officers.

About 4 square kilometres (1.5 sq mi), or 3%, of the Cook Islands ecoregion (which includes the Southern Cook Islands) is in protected areas.

== Human uses ==
=== Materials ===
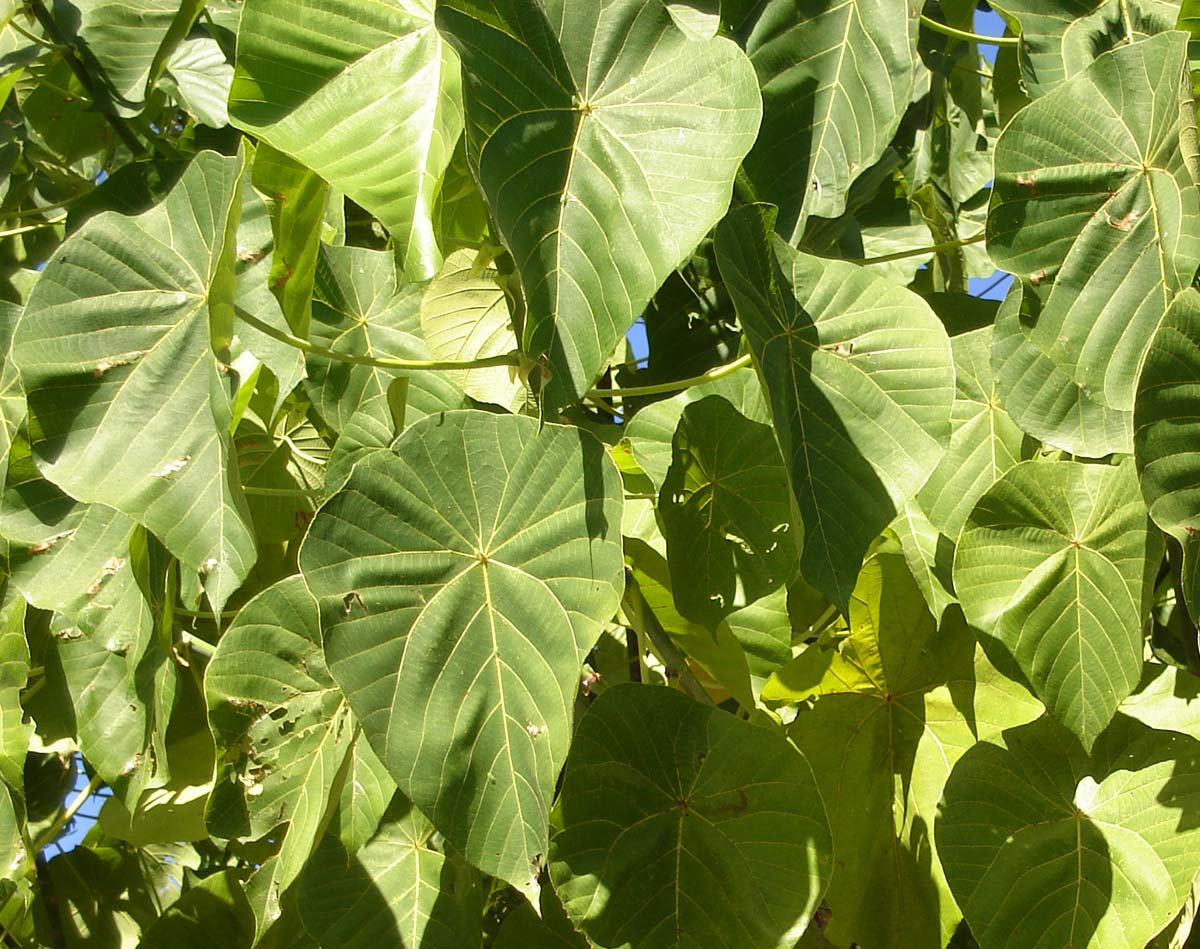
Macaranga harveyana

Macaranga harveyana is a medium-sized tree occasionally spotted in the disturbed landscapes of Rarotonga and other outlying islands. Although its population has declined over time, the tree remains highly prized for its durable timber, which is traditionally harvested to construct boat planks. Schizostachyum glaucifolium is a Polynesian-introduced bamboo found today in cultivation and along fernland borders. Originally called ko‘e, its name was later adopted by newer bamboo varieties. Its razor-sharp broken stems traditionally served as knives, while intact poles were used to construct house walls, musical instruments, and other essential tools. The aboriginally introduced coconut is widely cultivated and naturalized in littoral and disturbed spaces. Because of its endless utilities, this palm stands as the most important tree in Polynesia. Traditionally, the nut’s fibrous husk (puni) is processed into a universal Pacific coir twine (ka‘a), used for lashing, rope-making, and construction. The leaves are also woven into mats, baskets, and house walls. The unplaited fronds are used for fishing torches and traps. A native coastal and village tree, Thespesia populnea yields a fine wood essential to Pacific craftsmanship. It is heavily utilized for crafting slit-gongs (pâté), bowls (kumete), canoe parts, adze handles, and structural furniture.

=== Cultural uses ===
Tapa cloth, 19th century

The paper mulberry (Broussonetia papyrifera) tapa cloth was produced by harvesting one-inch saplings, peeling the bark, and separating the inner fibers with a clam shell (ka'i). After a 24-hour soak, the bark was beaten with a grooved mallet (ike) on a long wooden anvil (tutunga), an activity where rhythmic beating also signaled village news. The strips were washed, wrapped in leaves for a three-day retting process to soften the fibers, and beaten a second time. Unlike Tongan and Samoan traditions that join two layers using vegetable glue, these sections were felted together directly by overlapping and beating before being dried, left white, or dyed.

Tiare flower (Gardenia taitensis)

In Cook Islands culture, the ei (garland or wreath) serves as a primary symbol of affection, honor, and deep social respect. Among the various types of ei, those constructed thickly from nearly-open tiare Māori (Gardenia taitensis) buds are traditionally regarded as the most prestigious, and their presentation by family members or peers signifies profound communal esteem. These specific garlands are heavily utilized across a wide spectrum of life-cycle events and ceremonies, ranging from celebratory milestones such as weddings, graduations, and formal welcomes, to funerary rites where extensive wreaths are customarily layered over the deceased, the coffin, or the gravesite. Additionally, the tiare Māori plant features prominently in traditional postpartum practices, where it remains a custom to plant a shrub directly above the buried 'enua (placenta) following the birth of a female child. The blossom is traditionally worn as a single flower behind the ear, woven into neck ('ei kakī) or head garlands ('ei katu), and serves as a foundational ingredient in popular scented coconut oils.

Traditional fans

The tā'iri is a traditional type of fan originating from the Cook Islands. Typically constructed from a combination of wood and locally sourced plant fibres. The fan's body is primarily woven using coconut leaf rito and dyed pandanus, which are often accented with red and green dyed kiri'au (the inner bark of the Hibiscus tiliaceus, or sea hibiscus tree).

There is a circular type of the fan that came from Manihiki, an atoll in the Northern Group. The fan was likely to originate during the 1950s. It is made from the same materials used to make the normal fan. The concentric bands of coconut veinscovered in natural and leave of the pandanus dyed purple set in a pattern of a triangle. Numerous tassels, some made from bands of kiriau, decorate the outer rim of the main body. The circular wooden handle has broken off at the central point where it joins the fan's body, and a piece of plaited natural and purple-dyed pandanus leaf is loosely tied around it.

=== Traditional medicine ===
Traditional healing in the Cook Islands, known as Rongoā Māori Kūki 'Āirani, relies on medicinal plants used by local practitioners (taunga) alongside modern healthcare.

160 plant taxa that have been recorded in the Cook Islands have a medicinal use. Thespesia populnea is utilized in traditional medicine, with remedies from its bark and leaves used to treat urinary ailments, abdominal swellings, and infant teething pain. Local healers attribute a sexual valence to the fruits based on the split or intact nature of the calyx, and historically, its bruised, charred leaves served as a clinical dressing. The introduced papaya or pawpaw tree, is widely cultivated and semi-naturalised in disturbed areas. The fruit is commercially cropped and exported, while the grated green fruit mixed with coconut oil serves as a traditional topical treatment for boils (i'e'e), carbuncles (taupo), and cuts (motu) The guava tree, (Psidium guajava) utilizes its young leaves in traditional native medicine for postpartum recovery, abdominal pain, and wound treatment. A leaf infusion aids postpartum recovery and pain relief, while a blend with orange leaves alleviates abdominal pain, and chewed leaves are applied topically to treat cuts and wounds. Polynesian arrowroot (Tacca leontopetaloides), locally known as pia 'enua, is naturalized to the Cook Islands. While historically a common food source, its modern use for starch has largely been replaced by cassava (pia maniota), and because both plants share the local name pia, they are frequently confused in traditional medicine. In Cook Islands traditional healing, the starch of pia 'enua is used as a thickening agent, notably in coconut oil-based laxatives (for ʻaka ʻeke) and in remedies for specific headaches like tui kai roro and tui. Additionally, the dry starch is applied topically to treat sores and burns.
