= List of ecoregions in the Cook Islands =

This is a list of ecoregions in the Cook Islands.

== Terrestrial ecoregions ==
- Central Polynesian tropical moist forests
- Cook Islands tropical moist forests

== Marine ecoregions ==
- Eastern Indo-Pacific realm
  - Central Polynesia province
    - Phoenix Islands/Tokelau/Northern Cook Islands
  - Southeast Polynesia province
    - Southern Cook Islands/Austral Islands
