= Geography of the Cook Islands =

Coordinates: 21°14′S 159°46′W

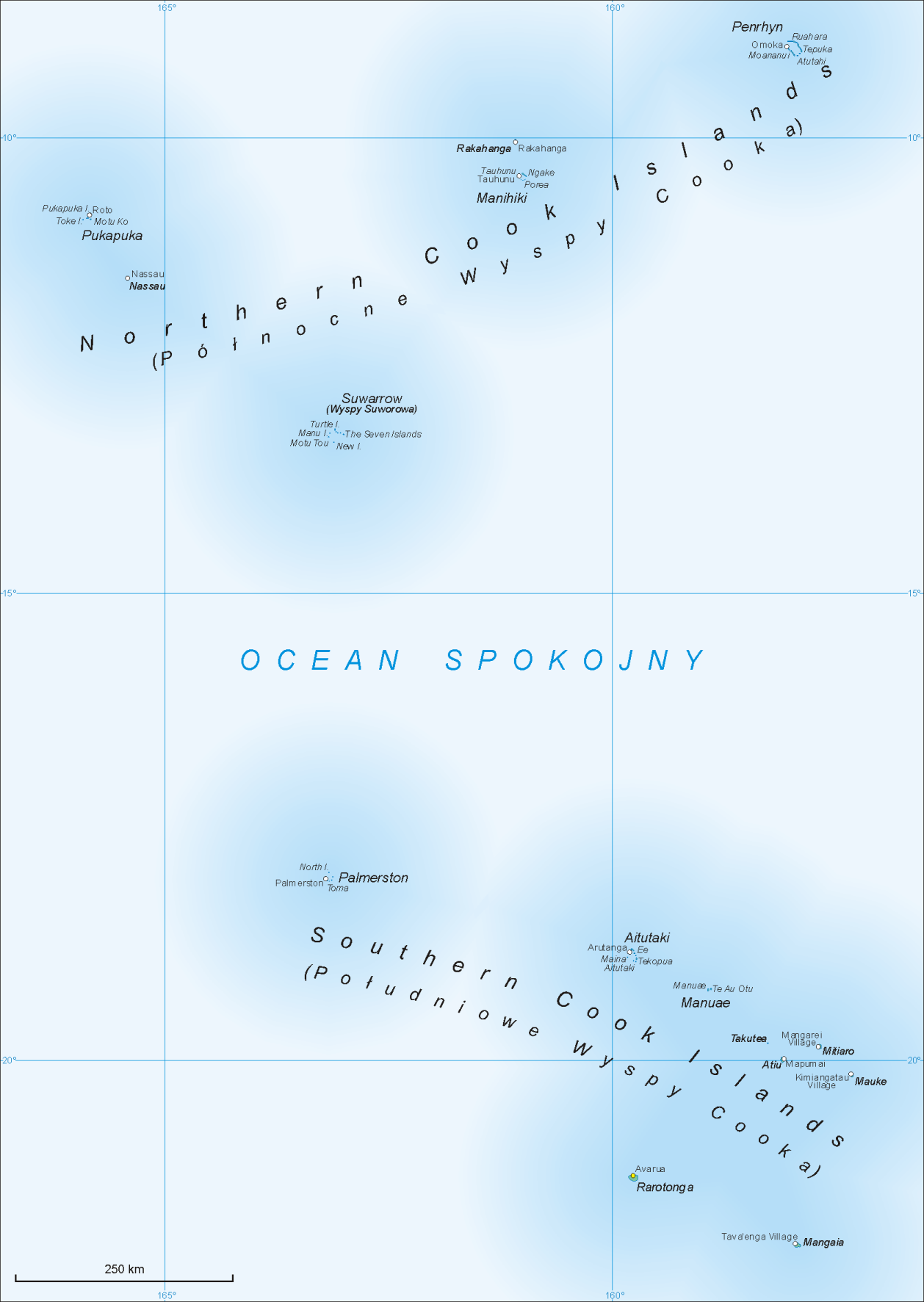
Map showing the two chains of the Cook Islands

The Cook Islands is located in Oceania, in the South Pacific Ocean, about halfway between Hawaii and New Zealand. The country can be divided into two groups: the Southern Cook Islands and the Northern Cook Islands. Rarotonga in the southern group is the main island. All the other islands are known collectively as the Pa Enua or Outer Islands.

The land areas of the southern islands range in size up to the 67-square-kilometre (26 sq mi) Rarotonga, while none of the northern islands are bigger than 10 square kilometres (3.9 sq mi). The most populous islands are Rarotonga with a population of 11,000 and Aitutaki with 1,800; none of the other islands have more than 500, and a few are uninhabited.

Two terrestrial ecoregions lie within the Cook Islands territory: the Central Polynesian tropical moist forests and the Cook Islands tropical moist forests.

== Islands and reefs ==
Island group	Island	Area (km^{2})	Population	Density (/km^{2})
Northern	Penrhyn atoll	10	233	24
Northern	Rakahanga	4	81	20
Northern	Manihiki	5	215	40
Northern	Pukapuka	1	456	351
Northern	Tema Reef (submerged)	0	0	–
Northern	Nassau	1	92	71
Northern	Suwarrow	0.4	0	0
Southern	Palmerston	2	25	12
Southern	Aitutaki	18	1,782	97
Southern	Manuae	6	0	0
Southern	Takutea	1	0	0
Southern	Mitiaro	22	155	7
Southern	Atiu	27	383	14
Southern	Mauke	18	249	14
Southern	Winslow Reef (submerged)	0	0	–
Southern	Rarotonga	67	10,898	162
Southern	Mangaia	52	471	9
Total	Total	237	15,040	64

The table is ordered from north to south, but can be re-ordered by any column. Figures are from the 2021 census.

== Climate ==
The climate is tropical, moderated by trade winds, with a dry season from April to November and a more humid season from December to March. The islands are in the path of tropical cyclones from December to March, the most notable of which were cyclones Martin (1997) and Percy (2005).

== Statistics ==
Area
- Land: 237 km^{2} (92 sq mi)
Area - comparative
1.3 times the size of Washington, DC
Coastline
120 km (75 mi)
Maritime claims
- Territorial sea: 12 nmi (22.2 km; 13.8 mi)
- Continental shelf: 200 nmi (370.4 km; 230.2 mi) or to the edge of the continental margin
- Exclusive economic zone: 200 nmi (370.4 km; 230.2 mi)
Terrain
Low coral atolls in north; volcanic, hilly islands in south
Elevation extremes
- Lowest point: Pacific Ocean 0 m
- Highest point: Te Manga 652 m (2,139 ft)
Natural resources
coconuts
fresh water
Land use
- Arable land: 4.17%
- Permanent crops: 4.17%
- Other: 91.67% (2012 est.)
Natural hazards
Typhoons (November to March)
Tsunamis (Year-round)
Time Zone
UTC -10 (GMT -10)
Environment - international agreements
- Party to: Biodiversity, Climate Change-Kyoto Protocol, Desertification, Hazardous Wastes, Law of the Sea, Ozone Layer Protection

== See also ==
- List of ecoregions in the Cook Islands
- List of lakes of the Cook Islands
- List of mountains in the Cook Islands
- List of rivers of the Cook Islands
