= Winslow Reef =

Winslow Reef is the name of two different submerged coral reefs in the central Pacific Ocean. The name may refer to:

- Winslow Reef, Cook Islands
- Winslow Reef, Phoenix Islands
