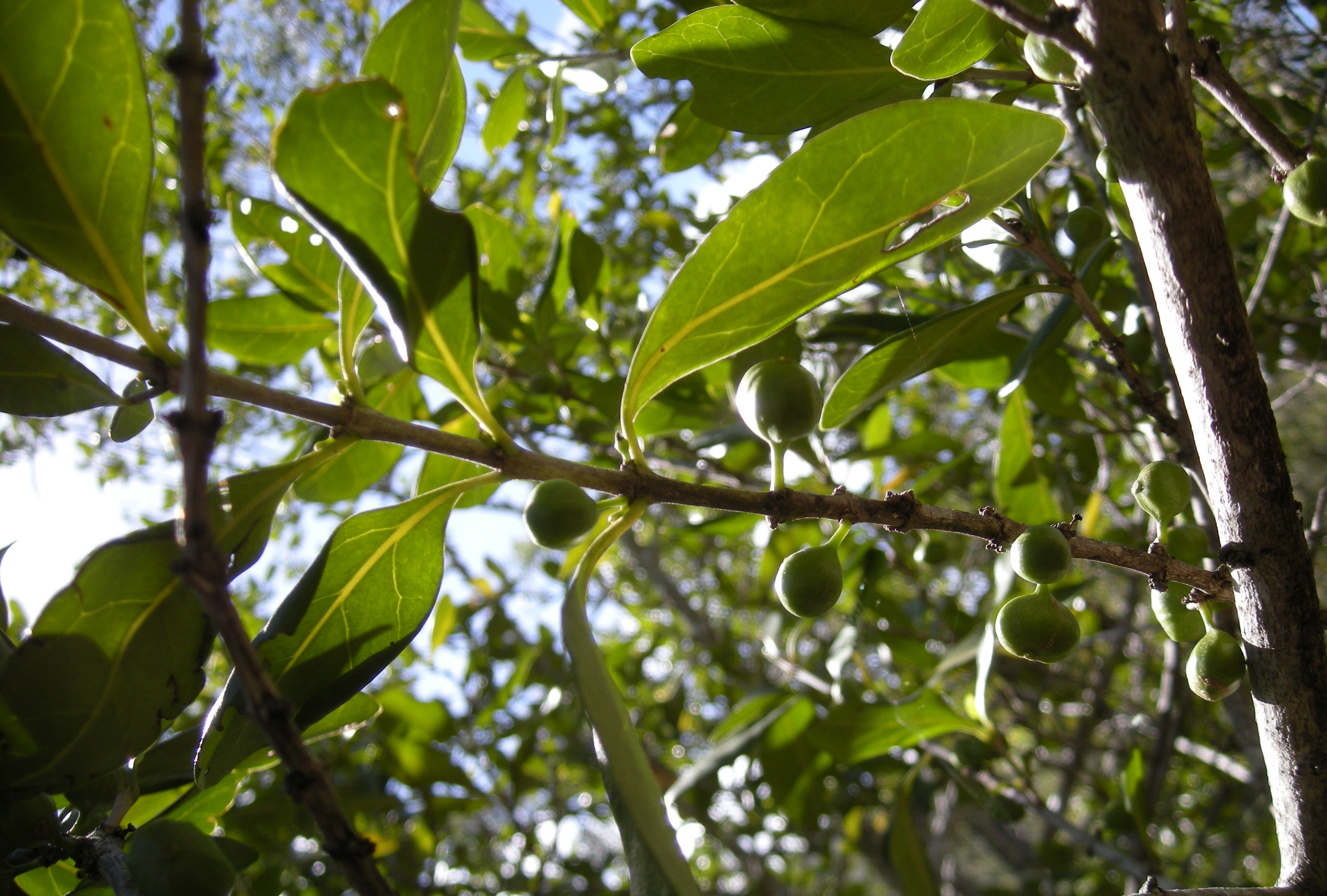

Scientific classification
- Kingdom: Plantae
- Clade: Tracheophytes
- Clade: Angiosperms
- Clade: Eudicots
- Clade: Asterids
- Order: Gentianales
- Family: Rubiaceae
- Genus: Cyclophyllum
- Species: C. longipetalum

Binomial name
- Cyclophyllum longipetalum S.T.Reynolds & R.J.F.Hend.

= Cyclophyllum longipetalum =

Coast canthium

Species of plant

Cyclophyllum longipetalum, known as the coast canthium is a shrub or tree occurring in eastern Australia. Commonly seen growing in a variety of different rainforest situations. It occurs from Lake Conjola in southern New South Wales to Fraser Island in southeastern Queensland.

== Description ==
Occasionally growing to tree size, the tallest specimens are 25 metres tall with a 50 cm trunk diameter. It is often seen as a shrub growing at the edge of the eucalyptus rainforest ecotone.

The trunk is mostly straight, though sometimes buttressed at the base on larger trees. The bark is grey or brown, with some wrinkles, cracks or fissures. Small branches are fairly thick, usually four-angled (square in cross section).

=== Leaves ===
Leaves are opposite on the stem, smooth edged without leaf serrations. 2 to 10 cm long, 1 to 4 cm wide. Leaf venation is not particularly obvious on the upper side of the leaf. Leaves sometimes show foveolae at the leaf axils (that is, raised bumps where the lateral leaf veins branch off from the main leaf mid vein). Net veins are not seen.

=== Flowers & fruit ===
Fragrant creamy golden brown flowers form from January to March. The fruit is a fleshy orange-red drupe, around 10 mm long, which appears from October to January. Within the fruit are often two seeds, one each within the two lobes of the hard capsule, surrounded by the glossy red aril.
