= Tema Reef =

Tema (Tima) Reef: submerged Coral Reef

- Interactive map of Tema Reef

Geography
- Location: South Pacific
- Coordinates: 11.6°S 165.37°W
- Archipelago: Cook Islands
- Adjacent to: Pukapuka; Nassau
- Length: 370 m (1210 ft)
- Width: 550 m (1800 ft)

Tema Reef, also called Tima Reef, is a submerged coral reef in the northern island group of the Cook Islands, 23 kilometres (14 miles) southeast of Pukapuka coral atoll.

== History ==
Legend has it that Tima, an Aitutakian warrior sailed to Nassau, but was chased away by Ngalewu, a chief from Pukapuka. On his return to Aitutaki he passed the reef nearby and named it Te Toka-O-Tima, the Stone of Tima.

The reef was sighted by Commodore John Byron on June 21, 1765. Captain William Williams of the missionary ship John Williams sighted the reef on May 15, 1864. It was again examined by HMS Alert in 1880. The reef was named in 1887 by Thomas Capel Tilly.

== Geography ==
Tema Reef is a sub-surface platform reef. No coral or rock shows above water, but the sea breaks heavily over the reef. On clear days, the reef can be seen from up to 9 miles (14 km). It lies about 2 miles (3.2 km) south of its location on maps. Tema Reef measures about 400 by 600 yards (370 by 550 metres), covering a shallow but submerged area of 0.16 square kilometres (0.06 square miles).
