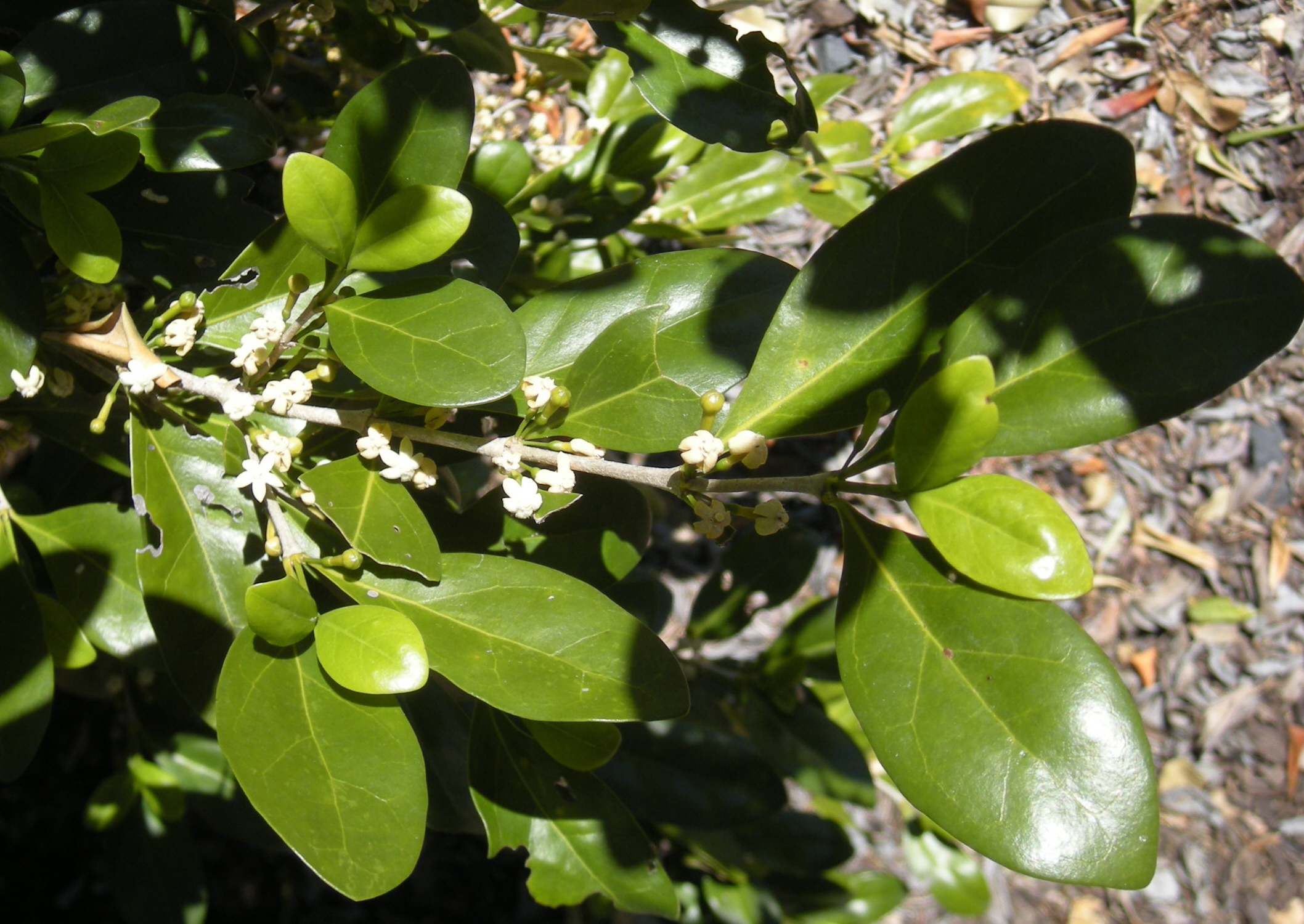
- Cyclophyllum coprosmoides

Scientific classification
- Kingdom: Plantae
- Clade: Tracheophytes
- Clade: Angiosperms
- Clade: Eudicots
- Clade: Asterids
- Order: Gentianales
- Family: Rubiaceae
- Subfamily: Dialypetalanthoideae
- Tribe: Vanguerieae
- Genus: Cyclophyllum; Hook.f.

Type species
- Cyclophyllum deplanchei Hook.f.

Synonyms
- Rhopalobrachium Schltr. & K.Krause

= Cyclophyllum =

Genus of flowering plants

Cyclophyllum is a genus of flowering plants in the family Rubiaceae. Its natural range extends from New Guinea and northern Australia to many islands of the Pacific Ocean.

== Species ==
As of October 2024, Plants of the World Online recognises 42 species, as follows:

- Cyclophyllum baladense Guillaumin
- Cyclophyllum balansae (Baill.) Guillaumin
- Cyclophyllum barbatum (G.Forst.) N.Hallé & J.Florence
- Cyclophyllum brevipes (Merr. & L.M.Perry) S.T.Reynolds & R.J.F.Hend.
- Cyclophyllum calyculatum Guillaumin
- Cyclophyllum cardiocarpum (Baill.) Guillaumin
- Cyclophyllum caudatum (Valeton) A.P.Davis & Ruhsam
- Cyclophyllum coprosmoides (F.Muell.) S.T.Reynolds & R.J.F.Hend.
- Cyclophyllum costatum (C.T.White) S.T.Reynolds & R.J.F.Hend.
- Cyclophyllum cymosum S.Moore
- Cyclophyllum deplanchei Hook.f.
- Cyclophyllum fragrans (Schltr. & K.Krause) Mouly
- Cyclophyllum francii Guillaumin
- Cyclophyllum guillauminianum Baum.-Bod. ex Mouly & Jeanson
- Cyclophyllum henriettiae (Baill.) Guillaumin
- Cyclophyllum jasminifolium Guillaumin & McKee
- Cyclophyllum letocartiorum Mouly
- Cyclophyllum longiflorum (Valeton) A.P.Davis & Ruhsam
- Cyclophyllum longipetalum S.T.Reynolds & R.J.F.Hend.
- Cyclophyllum lordbergense A.P.Davis
- Cyclophyllum macphersonii Mouly
- Cyclophyllum maritimum S.T.Reynolds & R.J.F.Hend.
- Cyclophyllum memaoyaense Mouly
- Cyclophyllum merrillianum Guillaumin
- Cyclophyllum multiflorum S.T.Reynolds & R.J.F.Hend.
- Cyclophyllum novoguineensis (Miq.) A.P.Davis & Ruhsam
- Cyclophyllum pancheri (Baill.) Guillaumin
- Cyclophyllum pindaiense Mouly
- Cyclophyllum protractum S.T.Reynolds & R.J.F.Hend.
- Cyclophyllum rectinervium (A.C.Sm.) A.C.Sm. & S.P.Darwin
- Cyclophyllum rostellatum S.T.Reynolds & R.J.F.Hend.
- Cyclophyllum sagittatum (Baill.) Guillaumin
- Cyclophyllum schultzii (O.Schwarz) S.T.Reynolds & R.J.F.Hend.
- Cyclophyllum sessilifolium (A.Gray) A.C.Sm. & S.P.Darwin
- Cyclophyllum subsessile (Valeton) A.P.Davis
- Cyclophyllum subulatum (Baill.) Guillaumin
- Cyclophyllum tenuipes Guillaumin
- Cyclophyllum tieaense Mouly
- Cyclophyllum tiebaghiense Mouly & Jeanson
- Cyclophyllum urophyllum (Valeton) A.P.Davis
- Cyclophyllum valetonianum (S.Moore) A.P.Davis & Ruhsam
- Cyclophyllum vieillardii (Baill.) Guillaumin
