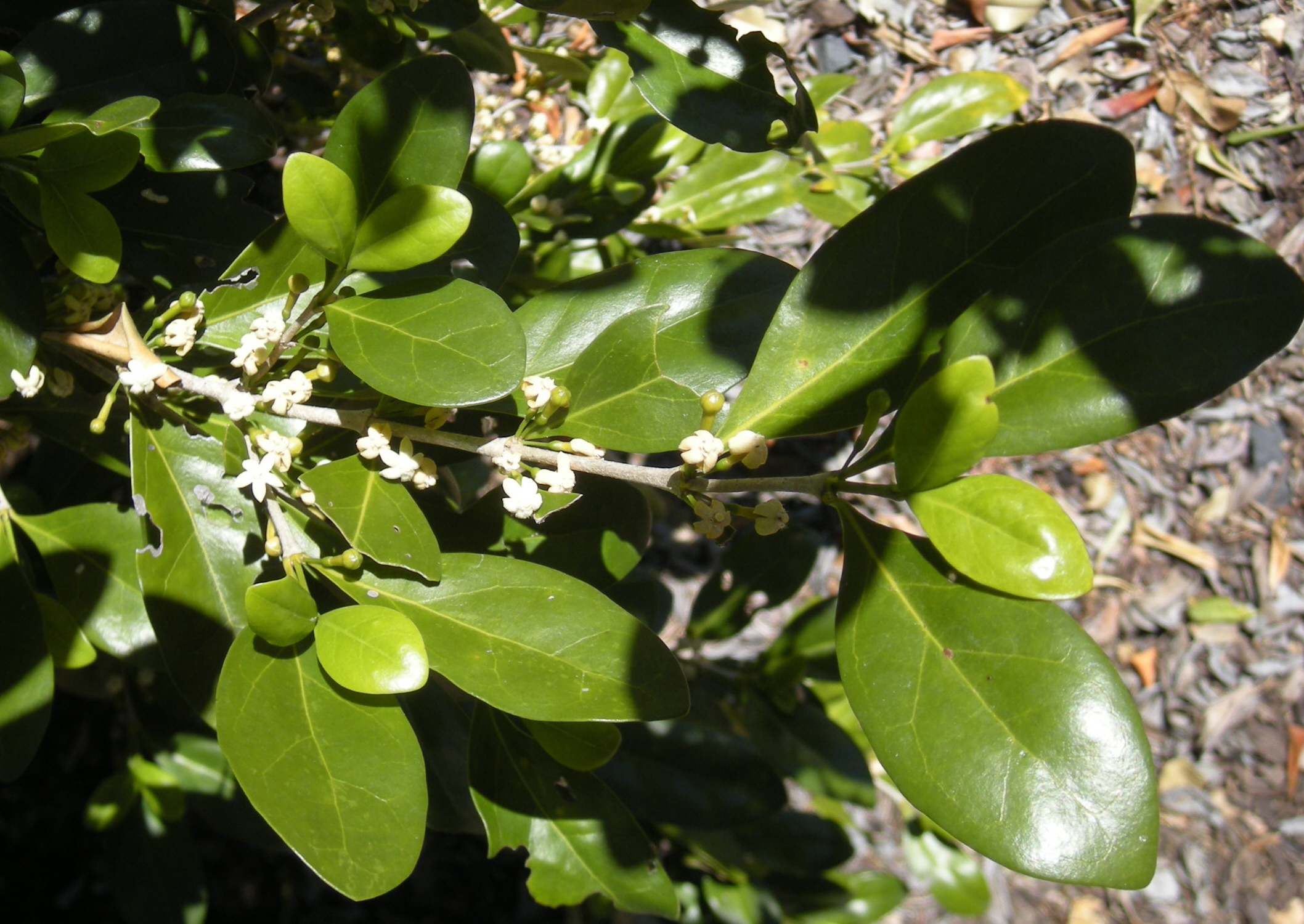
- Flowers and foliage

Scientific classification
- Kingdom: Plantae
- Clade: Embryophytes
- Clade: Tracheophytes
- Clade: Angiosperms
- Clade: Eudicots
- Clade: Asterids
- Order: Gentianales
- Family: Rubiaceae
- Genus: Cyclophyllum
- Species: C. coprosmoides

Binomial name
- Cyclophyllum coprosmoides (F.Muell.) S.T.Reynolds & R.J.F.Hend.

= Cyclophyllum coprosmoides =

Species of plant

Cyclophyllum coprosmoides , also known as coast canthium, supple jack, and sweet susie, is a shrub or tree occurring in eastern Australia. It is commonly seen growing in a variety of different rainforest situations, from Jervis Bay in New South Wales to the islands of the Torres Strait.

== Description ==
Growing up to 15 metres tall, the species is more often encountered as a tall shrub in subtropical rainforest, monsoon forest and littoral rainforest.

Fragrant white flowers form from January to March, turning golden brown with age. The fruit is a fleshy orange-red drupe, around 8 mm long, appearing from October to December. Within the fruit are often two seeds, one each within the two lobes of the hard capsule, surrounded by the glossy red aril. The mature fruit are edible.
