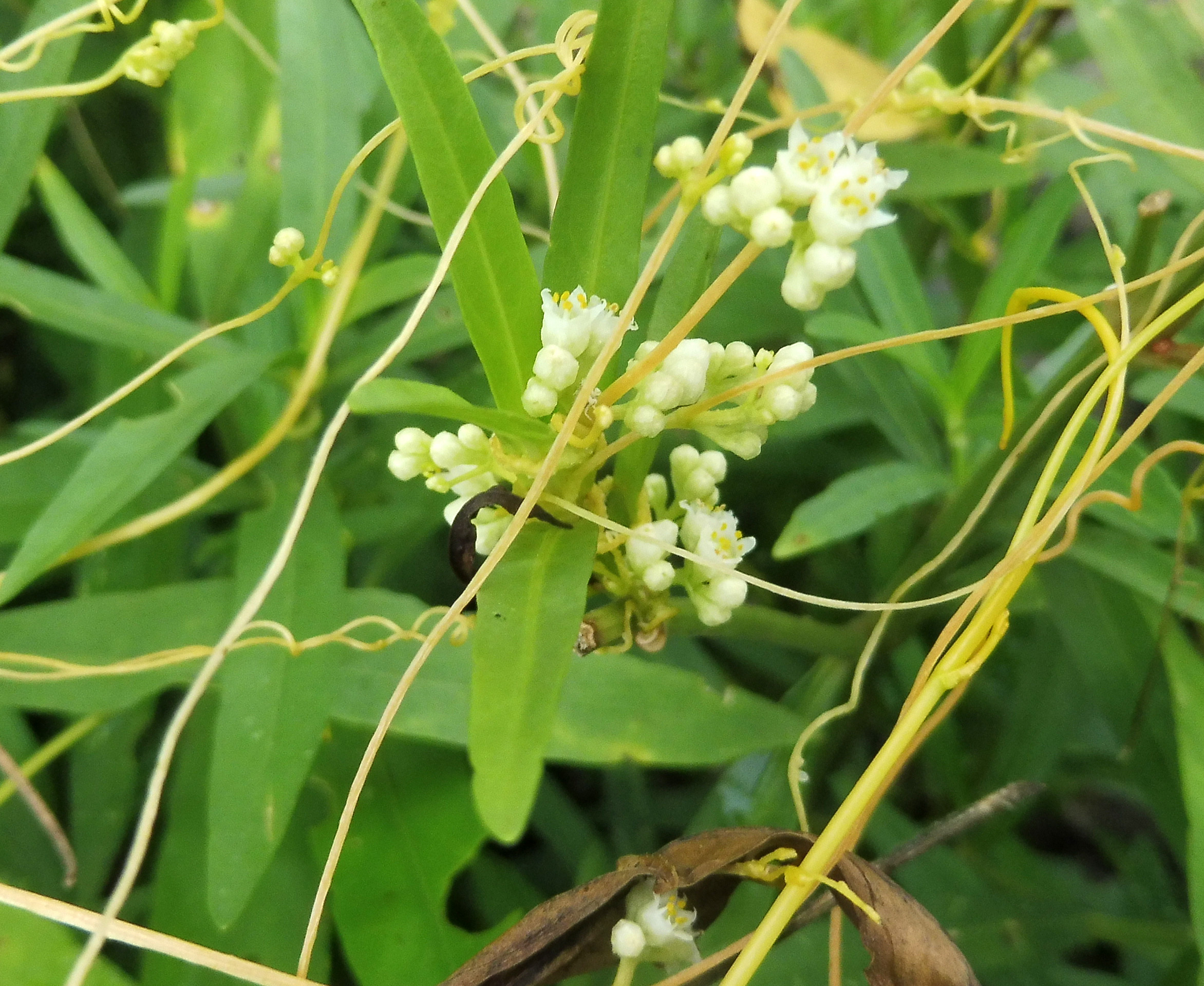
- Cuscuta pentagona flowers

Conservation status
- Secure (NatureServe)

Scientific classification
- Kingdom: Plantae
- Clade: Tracheophytes
- Clade: Angiosperms
- Clade: Eudicots
- Clade: Asterids
- Order: Solanales
- Family: Convolvulaceae
- Genus: Cuscuta
- Species: C. pentagona

Binomial name
- Cuscuta pentagona Engelm.

= Cuscuta pentagona =

Species of flowering plant

Cuscuta pentagona, the fiveangled dodder, is a parasitic plant in the morning glory family Convolvulaceae. It is native to North America, where it is widespread in the United States and Canada. Unlike the closely related C. campestris, it has not become established on other continents.

Cuscuta pentagona is a slender annual vine. It is parasitic on a wide range of herbaceous plants, but with particular emphasis on members of the aster family (Asteraceae).

Its typical natural habitat is in moist, open areas such as riverbanks, wet prairies, and pond edges. It is tolerant of disturbance, as can be found as a weed in fields and along roadsides.
