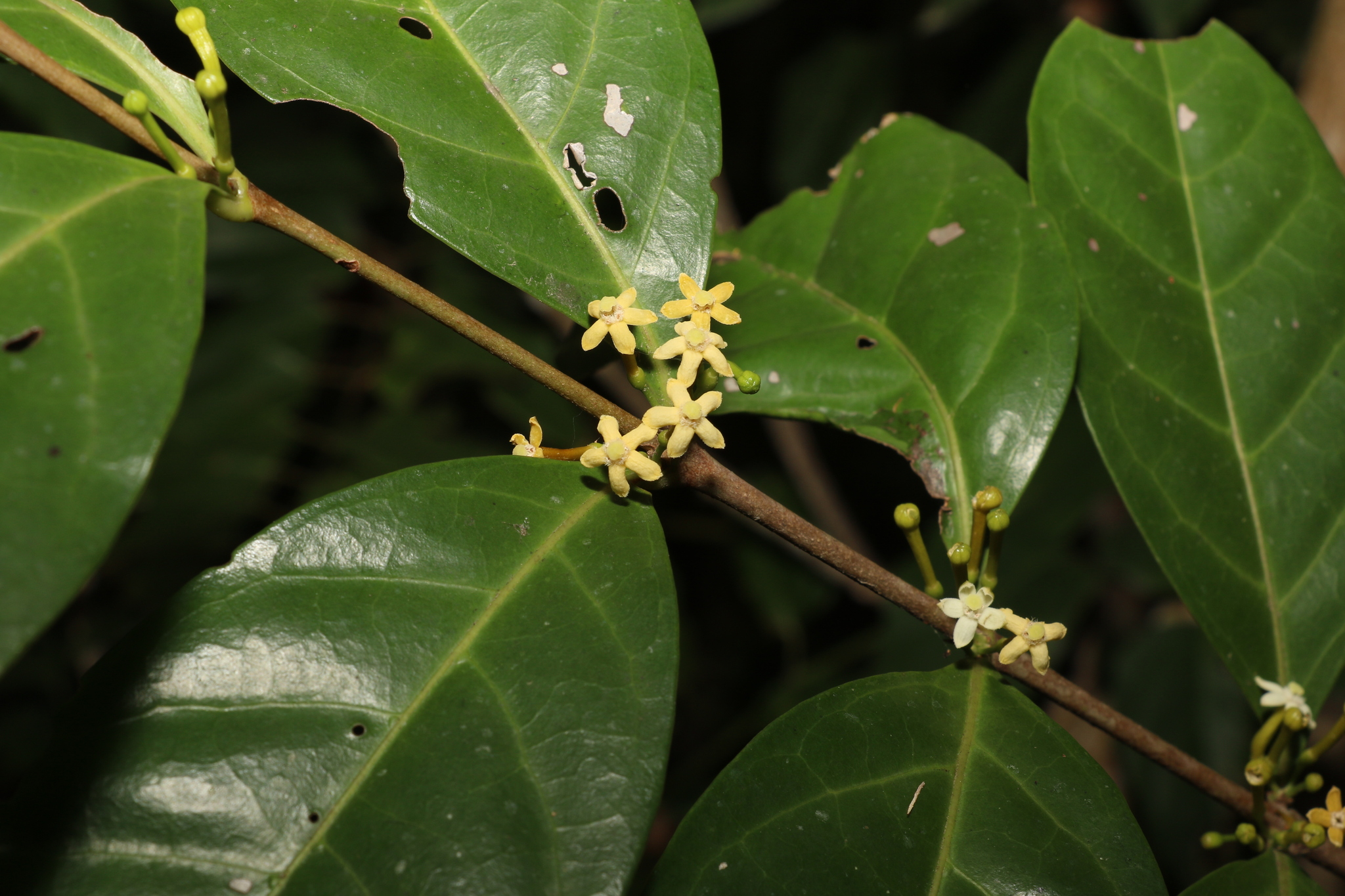

Conservation status
- Least Concern (NCA)
- Least Concern (IUCN 3.1)

Scientific classification
- Kingdom: Plantae
- Clade: Tracheophytes
- Clade: Angiosperms
- Clade: Eudicots
- Clade: Asterids
- Order: Gentianales
- Family: Rubiaceae
- Genus: Cyclophyllum
- Species: C. multiflorum

Binomial name
- Cyclophyllum multiflorum S.T.Reynolds & R.J.F.Hend.

= Cyclophyllum multiflorum =

Species of flowering plant

Cyclophyllum multiflorum is a species of plants in the family Rubiaceae found only in northeastern Queensland, Australia. It is a small tree up to 10 m (33 ft) tall with simple leaves arranged in opposite pairs. The inflorescence is a cyme with (usually) 6–9 tubular flowers about 13 mm (0.5 in) long and about 8 mm (0.31 in) wide at the apex. It is endemic to Queensland and occurs from around Rossville south to around Mount Elliot. It grows in both rainforest and wet sclerophyll forests, often alongside creeks and swamps, at altitudes from near sea level to about 1,120 m (3,670 ft). It was first described by Australian botanists Sally T. Reynolds and Rodney John Francis Henderson in 2001.

== Conservation ==
This species has been assessed to be of least concern by the International Union for Conservation of Nature (IUCN) and under the Queensland Government's Nature Conservation Act.
