= Cook Islands tropical moist forests =

Terrestrial ecoregion in the Cook Islands

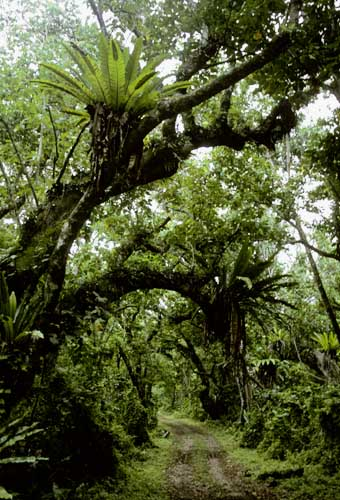
- makatea (coralline limestone) forest on Atiu

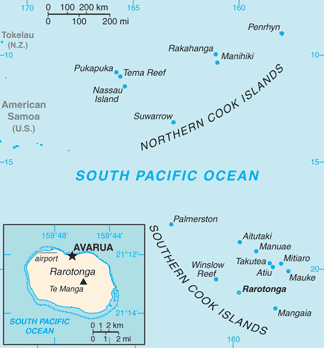
- Map of the Cook Islands. The Cook Islands tropical moist forests occupy the Southern Cook Islands. The Northern Cook Islands are part of the Central Polynesian tropical moist forests ecoregion.

Ecology
- Realm: Oceanian
- Biome: tropical and subtropical moist broadleaf forests

Geography
- Area: 127 km^{2} (49 mi^{2})
- Country: Cook Islands

Conservation
- Conservation status: Critical/endangered
- Global 200: South Pacific Islands forests
- Protected: 4 km^{2} (3%)

The Cook Islands tropical moist forests is a tropical and subtropical moist broadleaf forests ecoregion that covers the Southern Cook Islands in the Cook Islands.

== Geography ==
The Southern Cook Islands are a chain of volcanic islands in the Pacific Ocean. The principal islands are Aitutaki, Atiu, Mangaia, Manuae, Mauke, Mitiaro, Palmerston, Rarotonga, and Takutea. The ecoregion covers an area of 127 square kilometres (49 sq mi).

The islands are volcanic in origin, although all the volcanoes are now extinct. Rarotonga is the highest of the islands, with the deeply-eroded, steep-sided volcanic cone Te Manga (652 metres [2,139 ft] elevation) at its center.

Mitiaro, Atiu, Mauke, and Mangaia went through a long geologic cycle of erosion, subsidence, and emergence followed by uplift in the Tertiary era. Each has central eroded volcanic hills, reaching an elevation of about 100 metres (330 ft), surrounded by a belt of uplifted ancient coralline limestone, known as makatea, up to 2 kilometres (1.2 mi) wide.

Aitutake is a small central volcanic island surrounded by a lagoon and encircling barrier reef. Takutea is a small table reef. Palmerston and Manuae are atolls.

Rarotonga is home to nearly three-quarters of Cook Islanders. The town of Avarua is Cook Islands' capital and main commercial centre.

== Climate ==
The climate of the islands is humid and tropical. They are in the southeast trade wind belt, and the windward southeast sides of the islands and the summits are wetter than the leeward northwestern sides. The wettest months are November and December.

== Flora ==
Rarotonga's lowland forests have mostly been converted to human use. The mountainous interior is home to some natural forests of three main types.

Homalium forest is found on lower mountain slopes, above 50 to 200 metres (160 to 660 ft) elevation. It is a closed-canopy forest dominated by the endemic tree Homalium acuminatum, with the trees Cyclophyllum barbatum, Elaeocarpus floridanus, and Ixora foetida, and the giant liana Entada phaseoloides.

Fagraea-Fitchia forest is found at mid-elevations along knife-edge ridges. Fagraea berteroana and the endemic Fitchia speciosa are the predominant trees, and both have massive and extensive roots which provide support and stabilize the rocky slopes. Other common trees include species of Homalium, Canthium, Alyxia, Coprosma, Meryta, and Metrosideros.

Metrosideros cloud forest is found on cloud-shrouded peaks and ridges above 400 metres (1,300 ft) elevation, covering about 3% of Rarotonga's forest area. Metrosideros collina is the predominant tree, forming low-stature forests up to 8 metres (26 ft) high. In higher and wetter areas Ascarina diffusa is dominant or is co-dominant with M. collina. Other trees are Elaeocarpus floridanus, Pterophylla samoensis, and Pittosporum rarotongense. The liana Freycinetia arborea climbs into the trees, and they are covered with abundant epiphytic mosses and ferns. The understorey is dominated by the shrub Fitchia speciosa. Nine species of flowering plants are endemic to Rarotonga's cloud forests.

On Mitiaro, Atiu, Mauke, and Mangaia, the native vegetation of the central areas of volcanic soil have been almost completely replaced with introduced plants. The rough and difficult-to-cultivate makatea terrain harbors forests of Elaeocarpus tonganus and Hernandia moerenhoutiana, scrub forests dominated by Pandanus tectorius, and Barringtonia asiatica forest.

On Palmerston and Manuae atolls, coastal strand vegetation includes Heliotropum anomalum along the beach, joined by species of Scaevola, Suriana, and Pemphis behind the beach. Patches of forest occur inland, with species of Pisonia, Guettarda, and Pandanus, and introduced coconut palms (Cocos nucifera).

== Fauna ==
The Pacific flying fox (Pteropus tonganus) is the ecoregion's only native non-marine mammal.

The ecoregion is home to six endemic bird species. The Cook reed warbler (Acrocephalus kerearako) lives on Mitiaro and Mangaia, the Lilac-crowned fruit dove (Ptilonopus rarotongensis) on Rarotonga and Atiu, the Mangaia kingfisher (Todiramphus ruficollaris) on Mangaia, the Atiu swiftlet (Collocalia sawtelli) on Atiu, and the Rarotonga starling (Aplonis cinerascens) on Rarotonga. The Rarotonga monarch (Pomarea dimidiata) is very rare, found in limited areas of mid-elevation montane forest on Rarotonga, particularly Takitumu Conservation Area. In 2002 a second population was established on Atiu. Loss of habitat and predation by introduced rats has decimated the native species.

The cloud forests of Rarotonga are one of the few breeding areas for the herald petrel (Peterodroma arminjoniana).

There are also ten native terrestrial reptiles. Most are widespread tropical Pacific species, and none are endemic.

The islands were once home to 13 endemic species of endodontid snails and 11 species of charopid snails. Most are now extinct, and the remaining ones are threatened. Predation by the African ant Pheidole megacephala, introduced in the 1870s, has driven 11 of Rarotonga's 13 endemic land snail species to extinction. Rarotonga's cloud forests are the only home of the mist land snail (Tekoulina sp.), which is unique for being viviparous (bearing live young).

== Protected areas ==
A 2017 assessment found that 4 square kilometres (1.5 sq mi), or 3%, of the ecoregion is in protected areas. Te Manga Nature Reserve preserves most of Rarotonga's remaining cloud forest area above 400 metres (1,300 ft) elevation.
