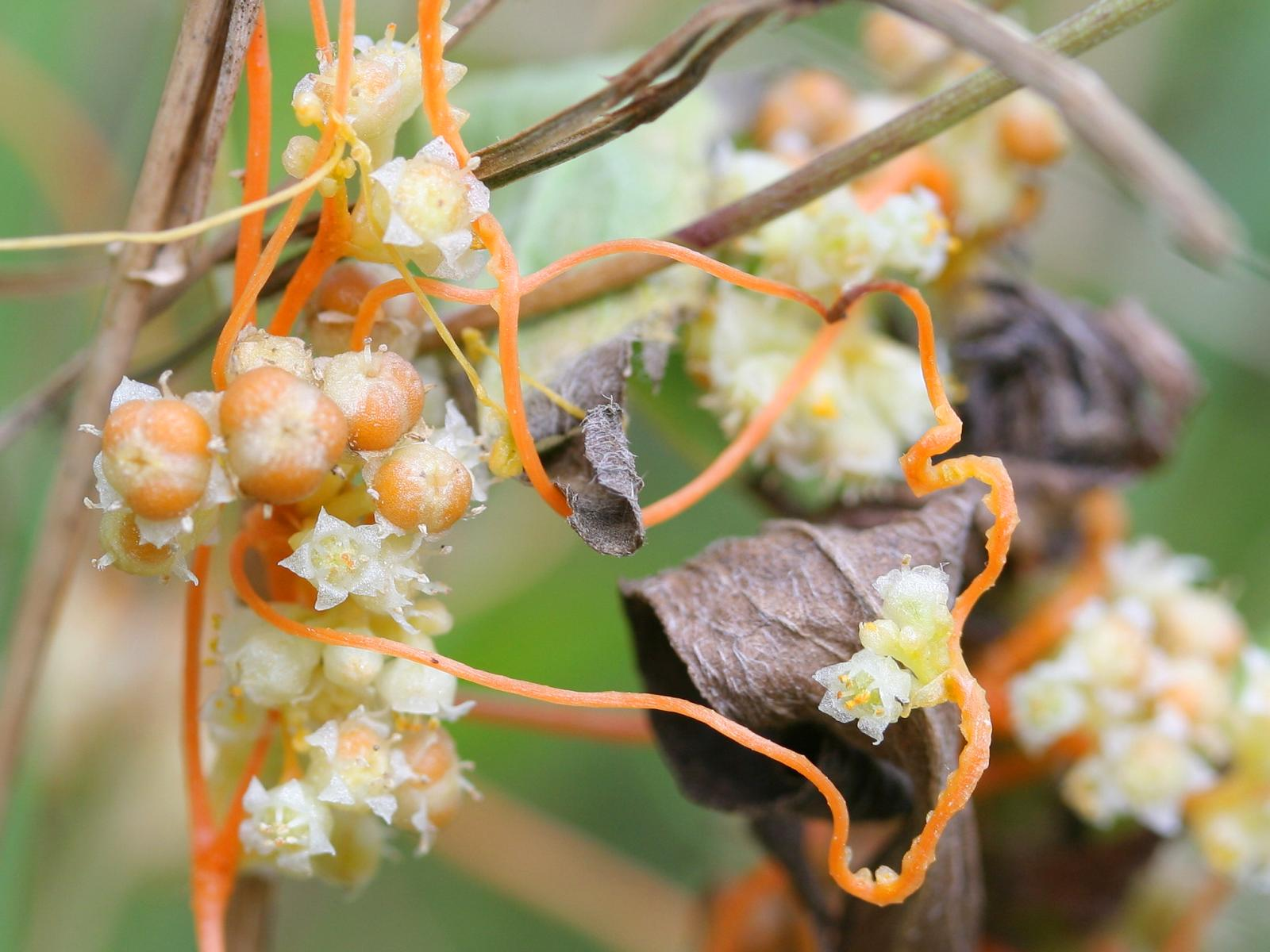

Conservation status
- Secure (NatureServe)

Scientific classification
- Kingdom: Plantae
- Clade: Tracheophytes
- Clade: Angiosperms
- Clade: Eudicots
- Clade: Asterids
- Order: Solanales
- Family: Convolvulaceae
- Genus: Cuscuta
- Species: C. campestris

Binomial name
- Cuscuta campestris Yunck.

= Cuscuta campestris =

Species of flowering plant

Cuscuta campestris, with the common names field dodder, golden dodder, large-seeded alfalfa dodder, yellow dodder and prairie dodder, is a parasitic plant which belongs to the family Convolvulaceae. It was formerly classified in the family Cuscutaceae.

It is native to central North America. It is a parasite of a wide range of herbaceous plants.

It is a pest of lucerne (alfalfa) and other legumes. It has become a widespread weed in many countries. It is known as 'golden dodder' in Australia.

It has been confused in some recent literature with Cuscuta pentagona Engelmann, but the differences between the two species are clear.

The seeds of this plant have been found to become dispersed by waterfowl in significant numbers.

== Description ==
The life cycle of the Cuscuta starts with seed germination. The seeds germinate near the surface of the soil, sending up thin pale green and yellow stems. The thread-like stems grow slowly until they touch another plant and begin to wrap themselves around it. Once fully wrapped around a host plant, Cuscuta campestris will form sucker-like roots, called haustoria, and penetrate the body of the host, stealing nutrients from them. If the seedlings do not make contact with a host plant, they will die. The seedlings cannot survive for long they find the appropriate plant stem by recognizing plant chemo-attractants. Cuscuta campestris is known for reducing the growth of their host plants. This mechanism gives them the ability to control other populations of plants such as Mikania micrantha. Another mechanism by which dodders recognize which plants to parasitize depends on the light reflected off the host plant. Cuscuta campestris is highly attracted to "far red light", which is a wavelength that is reflected by most plant surfaces. Dodders that were exposed to unfiltered light were able to attach to their host before their energy had been totally exhausted, but dodders that were only exposed to red light lost their way. Cuscuta campestris is a parasitic weed that is one of the most widespread in the world. It does not contain leaves or roots and must grow an absorptive organ as an interconnecting vessel between itself and the host plant. These absorptive organs allow for Cuscuta campestris to penetrate the tissue of the host plant and connect, drawing out nutrients from the host. Cuscuta spp. can simultaneously parasitize different host plants, suggesting that the species may have a complex foraging strategy.

Parasitic plants of the genus Cuscuta have little to no chlorophyll making them unable to significantly photosynthesize. This makes them photosynthetically inactive. Cuscuta species are thus referred to as holoparasitic plants, as they depend on their host plant for nutrients. About 10-15 species of Cuscuta, out of the known 200, are considered agricultural weeds which wrap their vines around their hosts and obtain their nutrients from them through specialized organs called haustoria. This mechanism for obtaining their food makes them very difficult to remove. Their growth has been cited to cause severe loss to crops that yield alfalfa, tomatoes, carrots and cranberry crops.

== Distribution and habitat ==
The native range of this species is unclear but thought to be North America, specifically Canada, US, and Mexico. It is also found in parts of the Caribbean, including Cuba, Bahamas, Jamaica, Martinique, and possibly parts of South America. It is widely naturalised in parts of coastal and subcoastal regions of Australia, found predominantly in the Southeastern Australia along the Murray River. Cuscuta campestris can be found growing in grasslands, open woodlands, gardens, riparian zones, and wetlands. Cuscuta campestris has a tolerance for a wide range of climatic conditions, from warm temperate regions to subtropical or tropical regions.

== Reproduction ==
Reproduction is through seed or vegetative spread. Pollination for C. campestris is autogamous, or self-fertilizing, and the species can produce up to 16,000 seeds on a single plant. In North America, flowering occurs in mid-summer, with less flowering occurring in humid, high rainfall locations. Cuscuta campestris seeds have a hard seed coating that requires scarification, reducing the danger of all seeds germinating at once. Germination can occur regardless of the amount of light available, as long as temperatures are between 10-30 °C. The seeds are able to remain viable for up to 10 years in soil.

== Management ==
Cuscuta campestris is an agricultural pest. By combining preventative, chemical, mechanical, and cultural methods, populations of Cuscuta campestris can be reduced. Scattered infestations can be dealt with using a hand-held flame gun, hand-pulling the host plants with the Cuscuta campestris parasite attached, or by mowing with a shallow blade. Cuscuta campestris must be controlled on vegetation located on roadsides and sidewalks. Because Cuscuta campestris is mainly spread by people, education to discourage carrying the plants to other locations is recommended.

Preventive management includes planting dodder-free crop seeds, cleaning agricultural machinery before each use, and managing pre-existing populations to reduce seed dispersal. While small infestations can be removed by hand-pulling, the recommendation for controlling large infestations is to remove all plants of host species and replace them with non-host species. Field dodder can be controlled using pre-emergence herbicides, which are applied before C. campestris emergence, and post-emergence herbicides, which are applied after C. campestris emergence. Cultural control is another method for removing field dodder from an area, as planting non-host crops, such as wheat, broccoli, corn, sorghum, and legumes can significantly reduce its presence. Attempts to control C. campestris using biological controls include using gall-forming weevils (Smicronyx spp.), agromyzid flies (Melanagromyza cuscutae), or a pathogen, Alternaria cuscutacidae. Once cleared, areas with a history of field dodder infestation should be watched for reinfestation.

== Ecology ==
Cuscuta campestris is insect pollinated and is recorded to have been visited in northern Florida by Augochloropsis metallica and Augochloropsis sumptuosa.
