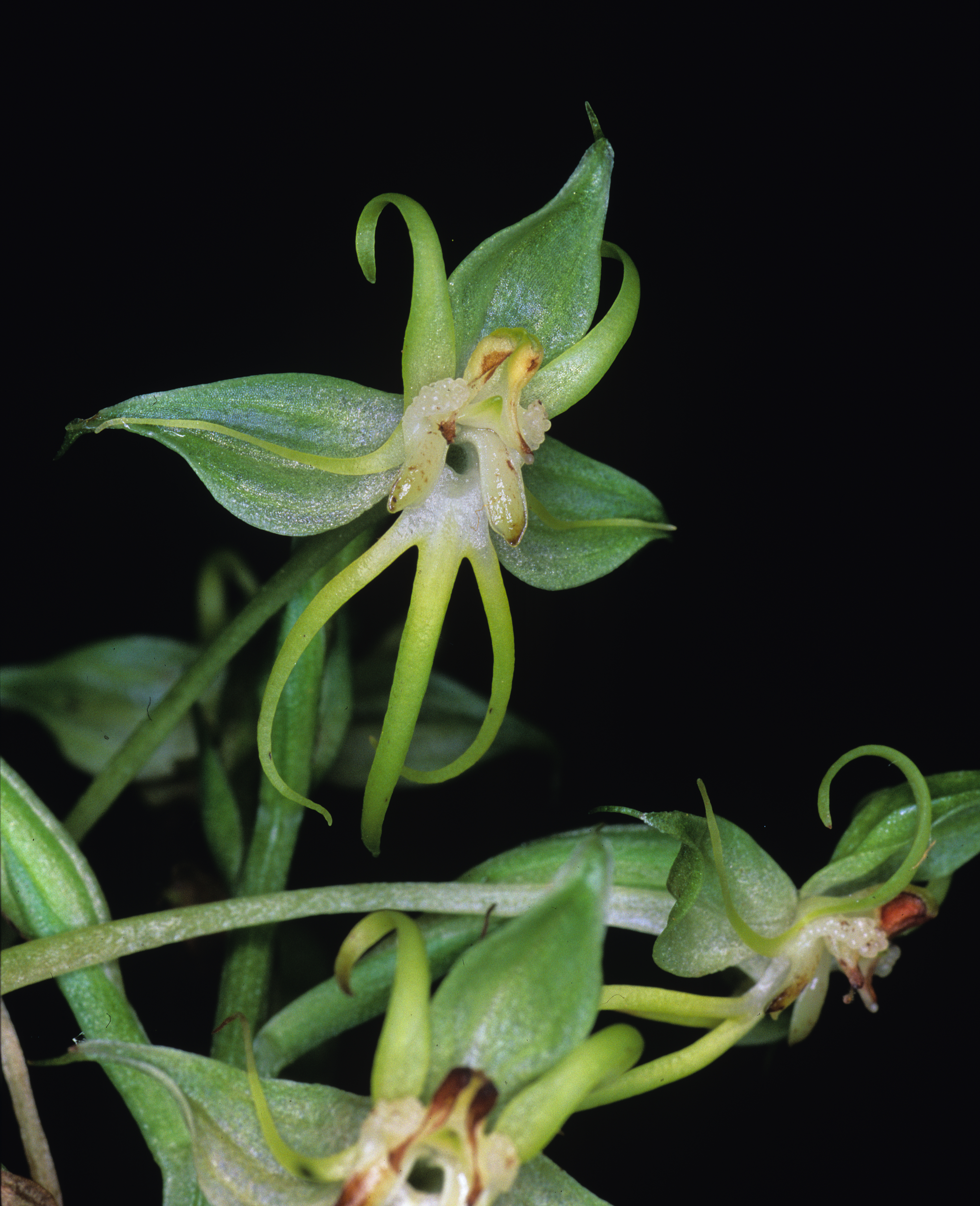

Conservation status
- CITES Appendix II (CITES)

Scientific classification
- Kingdom: Plantae
- Clade: Tracheophytes
- Clade: Angiosperms
- Clade: Monocots
- Order: Asparagales
- Family: Orchidaceae
- Subfamily: Orchidoideae
- Genus: Habenaria
- Species: H. amplifolia

Binomial name
- Habenaria amplifolia Cheeseman

= Habenaria amplifolia =

Species of orchid

Habenaria amplifolia is a species of orchid also called the Rarotonga ground-orchid. It is endemic to Rarotonga, growing in inland valley-bottoms and terraces. It is considered to be seriously endangered by the Cook Islands Government.
