= Northern Cook Islands =

One of two chains of atolls

Coordinates: 10°0′S 160°0′W

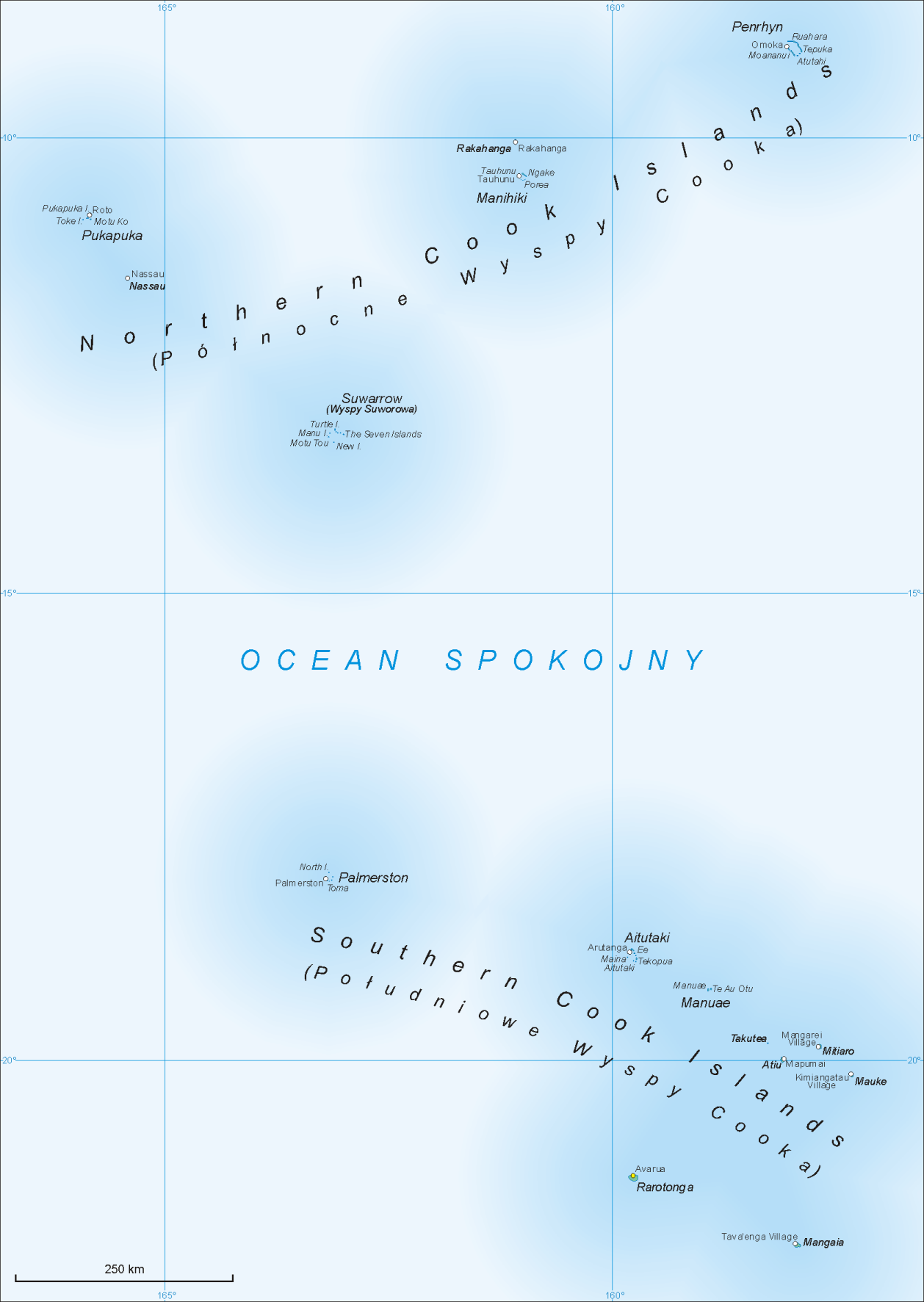
Map showing the two chains of the Cook Islands

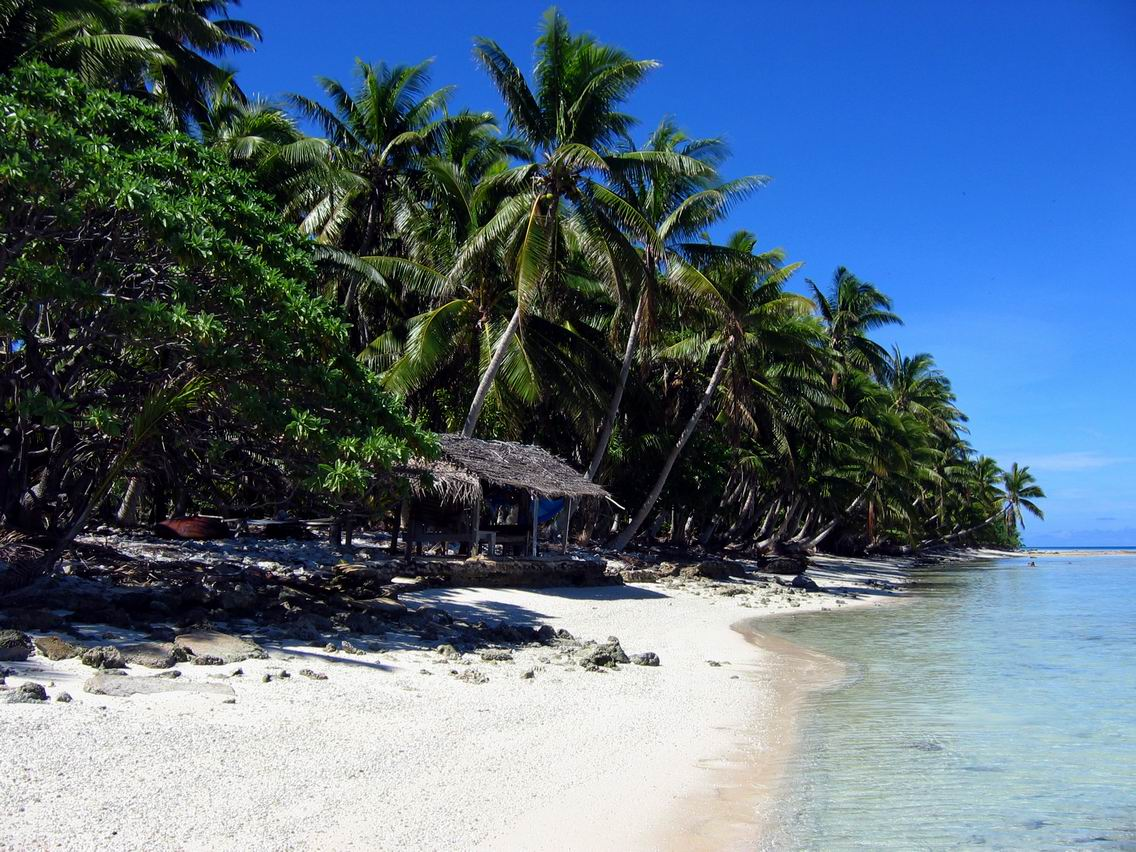
Anchorage Island, Suwarrow atoll

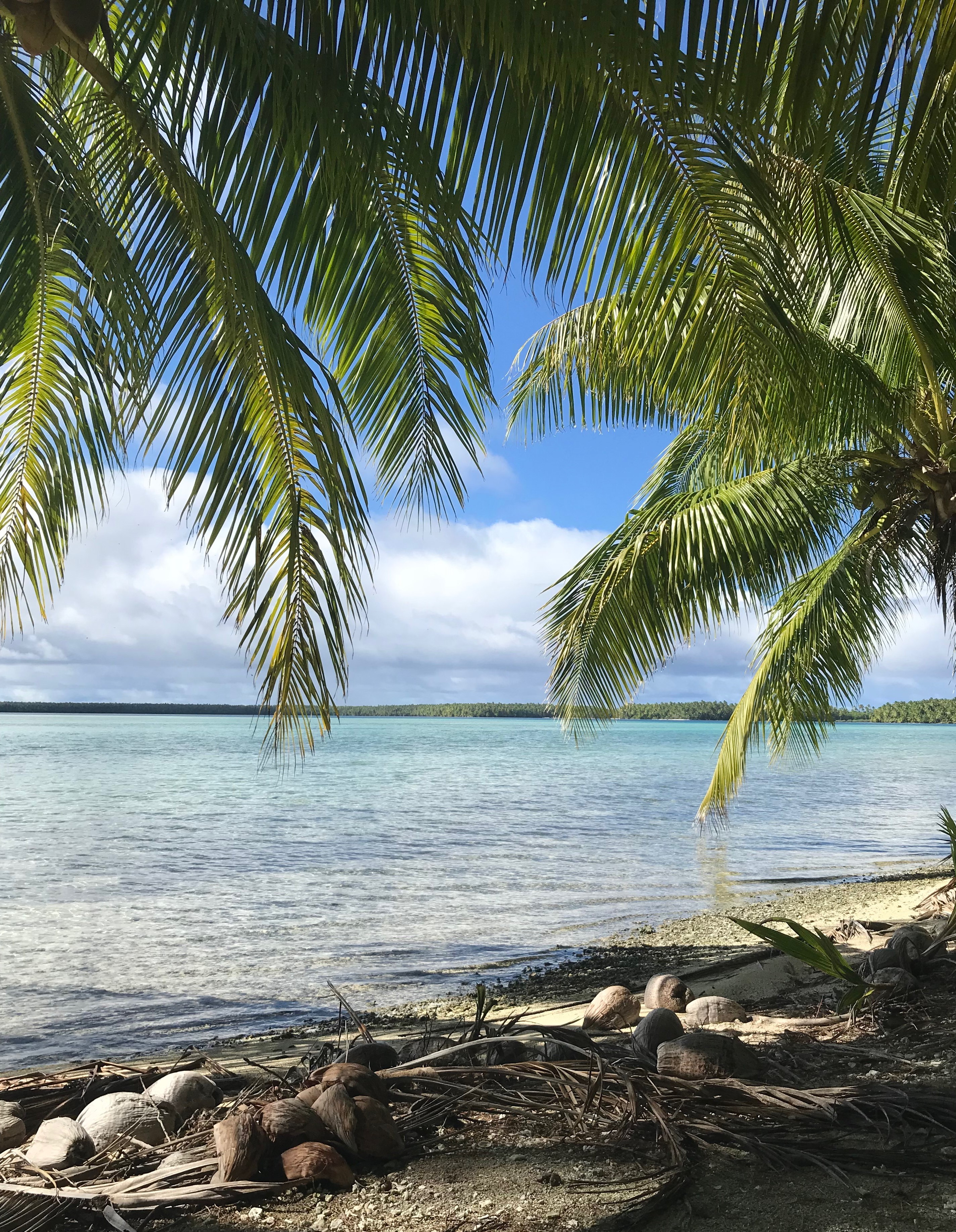
Rakahanga lagoon

The Northern Cook Islands is one of the two chains of atolls which make up the Cook Islands. Lying in a horizontal band between 9° and 13°30' south of the Equator, the chain consists of the atolls of Manihiki, Nassau, Penrhyn, Pukapuka, Rakahanga and Suwarrow, along with the submerged Tema Reef.

== Geography ==
The chain forms a roughly inverted triangular shape, stretching from Penrhyn in the northeast to Pukapuka in the northwest and to Suwarrow in the south. The Northern Cook Islands are separated from the Southern Cook Islands by a wide stretch of the Pacific Ocean, with the nearest part of the Southern chain being Palmerston Island, 500 kilometres (310 mi) due south of Suwarrow.

With an area of just 21 sq. km. and a population of 1,041 (according to the 2016 census), the islands only account for some 6% of the Cooks' population and 9% of the land area. Almost all of this population is on the three islands of Pukapuka, Manihiki, and Penrhyn.

The two chains are also geographically different: although both chains are formed from coral atolls which grew around volcanoes, the northern islands are far older, and the volcanic cones have sunk. As such, the northern chain is much lower lying than the southern chain. The two island chains are also parts of different marine ecoregions, with the Northern Cooks regarded as Central Polynesian and the Southern Cooks as Eastern Polynesian. Similarly, the land ecoregion in the Northern Cooks is Central Polynesian tropical moist forest whereas that of the southern chain is Cook Islands tropical moist forest.

== History ==
The islands were settled by Polynesians for several centuries before the first European visitors, Spanish explorer Álvaro de Mendaña, navigator Pedro Fernandes de Queirós, and their crew reached and named the island of San Bernardo in 1595, now widely believed to have been Pukapuka. De Queirós returned to the region in 1606 in charge of his own vessel, making landfall at Rakahanga.

The population of the chain was decimated by blackbirding during the 19th century, with the island of Tongareva (now more widely known as Penrhyn) being almost completely depopulated. At the end of the century, the chain became part of the Cook Islands Protectorate before the entire protectorate was annexed to New Zealand in 1900.

From the 1850s until 1980, the United States laid claim to much of the northern chain under the Guano Islands Act. Despite this, the United States military acknowledged New Zealand sovereignty during World War II operations. The Cook Islands became a self-governing island nation in free association with New Zealand in 1965, and the US relinquished any last claims to the islands when it signed the 1980 Cook Islands–United States Maritime Boundary Treaty.

== Economy ==
In general terms, the northern group is the less well economically developed of the two chains, having far less connection with the rest of the world than the southern chain. A compounding factor is the limited economic resources of the islands; though fishing is important to the group, the coral soil is of poor fertility and fresh water is generally in poor supply. The population is in decline, having reduced from over 2000 in the early 1960s.

The higher susceptibility of the chain to tropical cyclones (and the propensity for greater damage due to its low-lying nature) has also caused considerable hardship, with severe damage being recorded after Cyclone Percy in 2005. The vulnerability of the chain to global warming (for the same reason) has also not encouraged economic development of the islands.
