= Psychotria whistleri =

Conservation status
- Critically Endangered (IUCN 3.1)

Scientific classification
- Kingdom: Plantae
- Clade: Embryophytes
- Clade: Tracheophytes
- Clade: Angiosperms
- Clade: Eudicots
- Clade: Asterids
- Order: Gentianales
- Family: Rubiaceae
- Genus: Psychotria
- Species: P. whistleri

Binomial name
- Psychotria whistleri Fosberg

Plant species

Psychotria whistleri, the Rarotonga psychotria, is a herbaceous plant, a member of the Rubiaceae family.

== Description ==
Small shrub that grows up to 2 meters tall, with black, brittle stems. The leaves are glossy green on both sides, oval-shaped, and grow in clusters at the tips of the branches. They are up to 9 cm long and 3 cm wide, tapering to a sharp tip and base, with smooth edges and 1 cm stalks. The flowers are white, about 15 mm across, with a 1 cm tubular base and five narrow petals up to 7 mm long. The fruits are oval, about 10 mm long and 5 mm wide, and turn red when ripe.

== Distribution ==
It is an endemic species to Cook Islands.

== Taxonomy ==
It was named by Francis Fosberg, in Micronesica 23: 3 in 1990.
