= Nassau (Cook Islands) =

Island of the Cook Islands

Native name: Te Nuku-o-Ngalewu
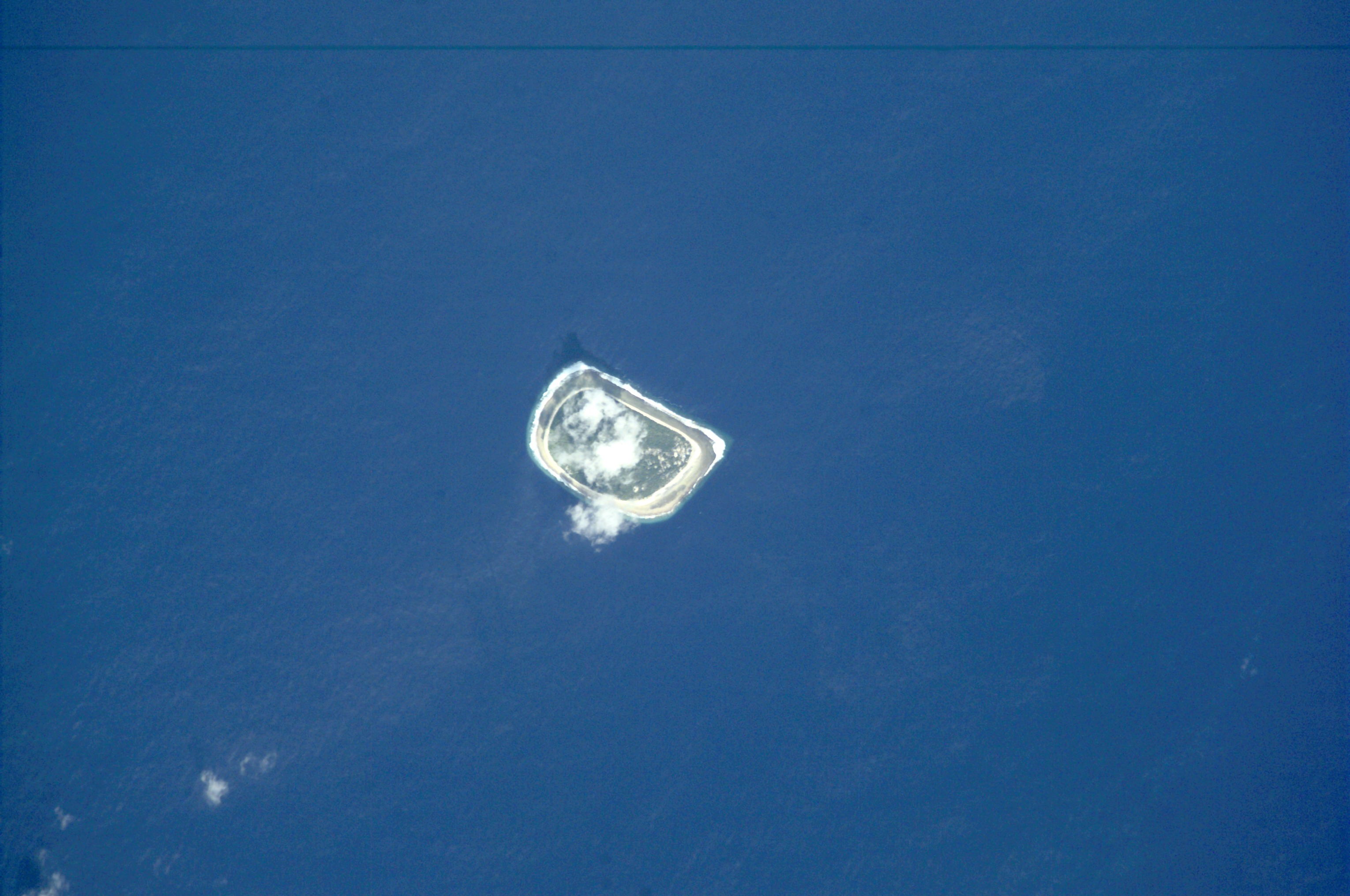
- Nassau from space
- Interactive map of Nassau

Geography
- Location: Central-Southern Pacific Ocean
- Coordinates: 11°34′4″S 165°24′25″W
- Archipelago: Cook Islands
- Area: 1.2 km^{2} (0.46 sq mi)

Administration
- Cook Islands

Demographics
- Population: 78 (2016)
- Ethnic groups: Polynesian

Location of Nassau Atoll in the Pacific Ocean

Nassau is an island in the northern group of the Cook Islands. It is approximately 1,246 kilometres (774 mi) north of the capital island of Rarotonga and 88 kilometres (55 mi) from Pukapuka coral atoll. Lacking an airstrip, it is accessible only by boat. It is named after a 19th-century whaling ship. Its indigenous name, Te Nuku-o-Ngalewu, means "Land of Ngalewu" after the Pukapukan who was put in charge of it.

== Geography ==
Located 88 kilometres (55 mi) south of Pukapuka, Nassau is just 9 metres (30 ft) above sea level, with an oval sandy cay on a coral reef foundation and is surrounded by a narrow reef flat. It is covered with palms, and is the only island of the Northern Group without a lagoon. The surrounding reef is 90 to 130 metres (300 to 430 ft) wide on all but the north side where it is narrower. The village is located in the north-west. Inland there are rich taro swamps and fruit groves, and offshore there is good fishing. It has a population of 78, according to the 2016 census.

Nassau is governed by the Pukapuka Island Council. The Nassau Island Committee advises the Pukapuka Island Council on matters of Nassau Island. Families live in thatched cottages called kikau. Elliot Smith, in the Cook Islands Companion (Pacific Publishing Company, Albany, California) describes Nassau as "a small garden of Eden".

== History ==
Historical population
Year	Pop.	±%
1936	18	—
1945	0	−100.0%
1951	124	—
1961	109	−12.1%
1966	167	+53.2%
1971	160	−4.2%
1976	123	−23.1%
1981	137	+11.4%
1986	119	−13.1%
1996	99	−16.8%
2001	72	−27.3%
2006	75	+4.2%
2011	73	−2.7%
2016	78	+6.8%

Nassau originally belonged to the islanders of nearby Pukapuka and was called Te Nuku-o-Ngalewu which means "Land of Ngalewu" after the Pukapukan who was put in charge of it. When the two islands fell out with each other, it was renamed "Deserted Island" (Te Motu Ngaongao), supposedly by the islanders of Manihiki who drifted to the island and found it deserted.

The first European to discover the island was Louis Coutance of the ship Adele, who named it "Adele island" in 1803. Other Europeans to encounter Nassau named it "Lydra Island" (1827), "Ranger Island" (pre-1835), and "Mitchell Island" (1834). In 1835 the captain of an American whaling vessel, John D. Sampson, named it after his vessel, the Nassau. The following year another American whaler named it "New-Port island". On 8 February 1860, a claim was filed by the United States Guano Company under the Guano Islands Act.

In 1876 an American occupied the island for use as a coconut plantation, employing workers from Pukapuka. From 1916 to 1926 it was leased as a copra plantation by the Samoa Shipping and Trading Company, using workers from Samoa and the Gilbert and Ellice Islands. It continued to be occupied intermittently until it was sold to the Cook Islands government in 1945. In 1951 it was purchased by the Island Council of Pukapuka, which sent annual expeditions to harvest copra. The island became permanently settled around 1970.

The island was severely damaged in February 2005 by Cyclone Percy, which destroyed every home and contaminated cropland and water supplies with salt water. Recovery work to the island's infrastructure (Health Clinic, School, Powerhouse, Telecommunications Network and Meeting House) was completed with the help of NZAID and the Government of the Cook Islands in October of that same year, a major feat due to the island's remoteness and infrequent shipping services. The island now has a completely new school thanks to the NZAID Schools Refurbishment Programme, which is administered by the Cook Islands Investment Corporation.

== Economy ==
The economy of Nassau originally depended on harvesting copra, with Pukapukan expeditions harvesting a third to a half as much as from the (much larger) Pukapuka. As with Pukapuka, the economy was run communally, with foremen and leaders telling the expedition members what needed to be done, and everyone sharing equally in the proceeds.

Because there is no airport, access is limited to inter-island ship from Rarotonga, a voyage of three days or more, or from Pukapuka. The service is infrequent. A harbour was planned in 2007, and in 2010 a small boat passage and mooring wharf had been dynamited out of the reef top, and a second phase was underway in December 2010. The environmental impact was small after the initial blasting A tender for the design of an improved harbour was issued in April 2020.

In January 2017 the Taio Shipping vessel MV Moana Nui ran aground on Nassau's reef. The wreck was left in place, and subsequently shifted to block access to Nassau's harbour. A contract to salvage and remove the wreck was issued in November 2019.

Nassau was connected to the other islands by telephone in 2004. In 2015 a solar / battery power station was installed, replacing diesel generators and allowing 24-hour electricity.
