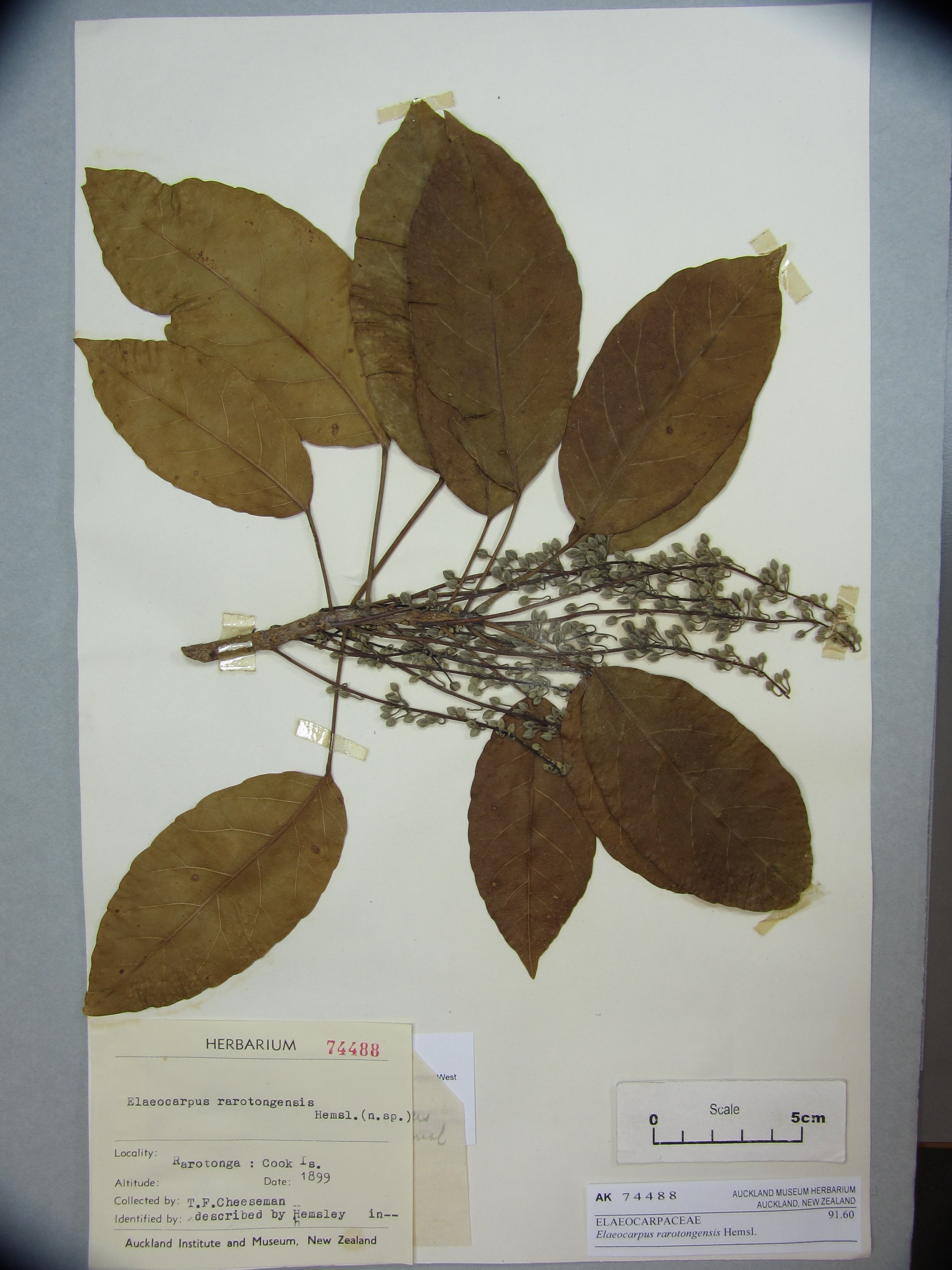

Conservation status
- Least Concern (IUCN 3.1)

Scientific classification
- Kingdom: Plantae
- Clade: Tracheophytes
- Clade: Angiosperms
- Clade: Eudicots
- Clade: Rosids
- Order: Oxalidales
- Family: Elaeocarpaceae
- Genus: Elaeocarpus
- Species: E. floridanus

Binomial name
- Elaeocarpus floridanus Hemsl. (1896)

Synonyms
- Elaeocarpus rarotongensis Hemsl. (1896); Elaeocarpus samoensis Lauterb. (1908); Elaeocarpus tonganus Burkill (1901)

= Elaeocarpus floridanus =

Species of flowering plant

Elaeocarpus floridanus, common name Polynesian Elaeocarpus is a species of plant in the family Elaeocarpaceae. It is a tree native to the South Pacific, from the Bismarck Archipelago to the Cook and Tubuai islands of the southwestern Pacific.

== Description ==
Elaeocarpus floridanus is an evergreen tree, growing up to 20 metres (66 ft) tall.

== Range and habitat ==
Elaeocarpus floridanus ranges from the Bismarck Archipelago of Papua New Guinea through the Solomon Islands, Santa Cruz Islands, Vanuatu, Fiji, Wallis and Futuna, Tonga, Niue, Samoan Islands, and Cook Islands to the Tubuai Islands of French Polynesia.

It grows in lowland and montane rain forests.
