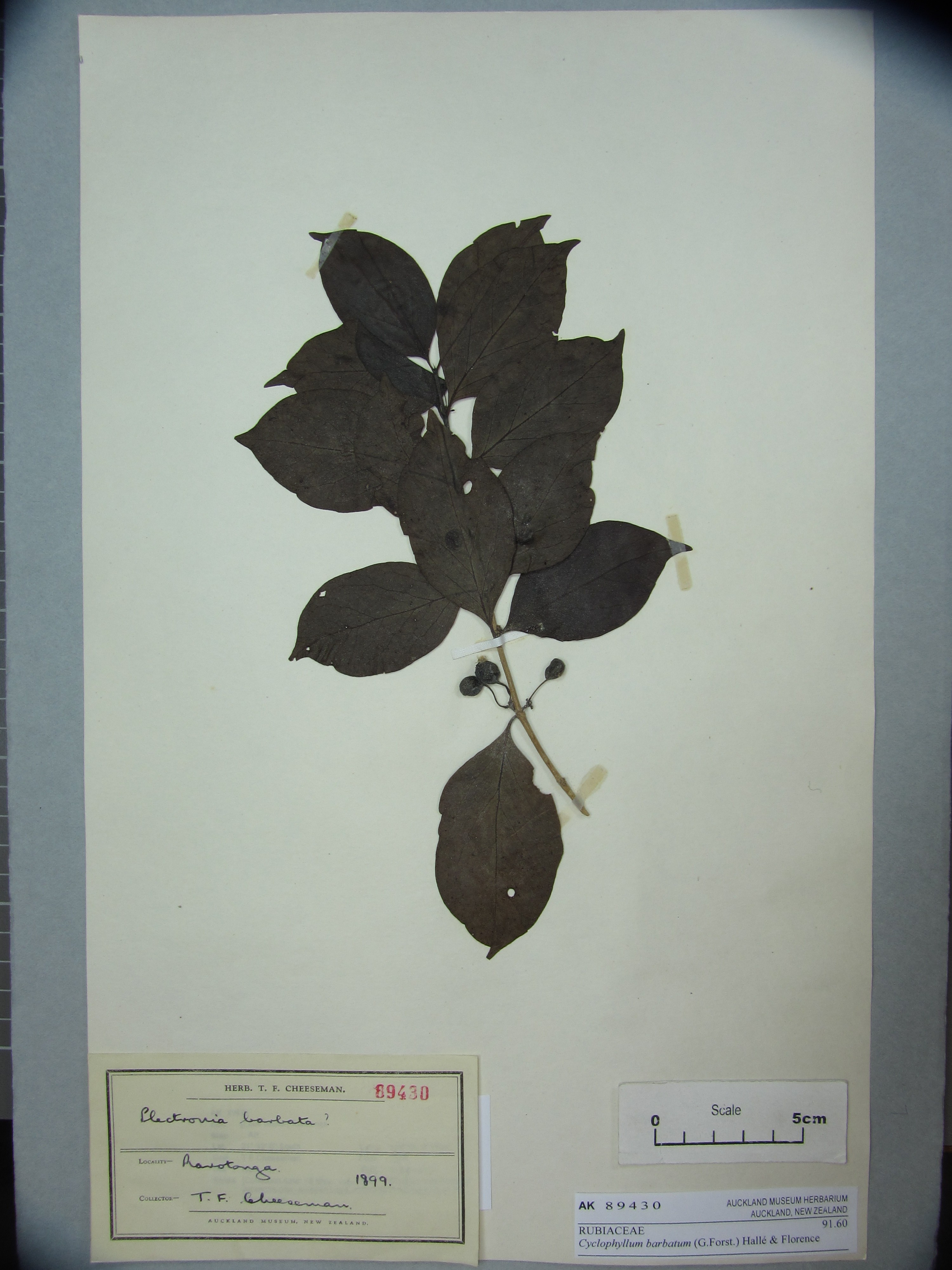

Conservation status
- Least Concern (IUCN 3.1)

Scientific classification
- Kingdom: Plantae
- Clade: Tracheophytes
- Clade: Angiosperms
- Clade: Eudicots
- Clade: Asterids
- Order: Gentianales
- Family: Rubiaceae
- Genus: Cyclophyllum
- Species: C. barbatum

Binomial name
- Cyclophyllum barbatum (G.Forst.) N.Hallé & J.Florence (1986 publ. 1987)

Synonyms
- Canthium barbatum (G.Forst.) Seem. (1866); Canthium korrorense (Valeton) Kaneh. (1932); Canthium rupestre Hosok. (1942); Chiococca barbata G.Forst. (1786); Chiococca odorata Hook. & Arn. (1832); Cyclophyllum marquesense (F.Br.) Govaerts (2008); Cyclophyllum saviense Guillaumin (1937); Plectronia barbata (G.Forst.) K.Schum. (1891); Plectronia korrorensis Valeton (1930); Plectronia marquesensis F.Br. (1935); Plectronia marquesensis var. acuta F.Br. (1935); Plectronia raiateensis J.W.Moore (1933); Plectronia rapae L.Riley (1926); Plectronia temehaniensis J.W.Moore (1933)

= Cyclophyllum barbatum =

Species of plant

Cyclophyllum barbatum is a species of flowering plant in the family Rubiaceae. It is a shrub or tree native to the South Pacific, including the Caroline Islands, Cook Islands, Fiji, Marquesas Islands, Pitcairn Islands, Samoan Islands, Society Islands, Solomon Islands, Tonga, Tuamotu Archipelago, Tubuai Islands, and Vanuatu. It has been introduced to Hawaii.

== Habitat ==
On Rarotonga in the Cook Islands it is common in Homalium forest on lower mountain slopes, dominated by the endemic tree Homalium acuminatum.

In the Marquesas Islands it is a common understory shrub or tree in mid-elevation forests from 300 to 800 metres (980 to 2,620 ft) elevation and with an average annual rainfall of 2,000 to 3,000 millimetres (79 to 118 in).
