= Winslow Reef, Cook Islands =

Reef in the Southern Cook Islands

Winslow Reef
- Interactive map of Winslow Reef

Geography
- Location: South Pacific
- Coordinates: 20°38′S 160°56′W
- Type: Coral
- Archipelago: Cook Islands
- Adjacent to: Rarotonga

Winslow Reef is a supposed submerged coral reef of the southern Cook Islands, located 133 kilometres (83 miles) northwest of Rarotonga, at 20°38′S 160°56′W or 20°38′S 161°02′W. Attempts made to find the reef have proven unsuccessful.

== History ==
Winslow Reef is described on British naval maps, as well as Russian maps modelled after British maps. It also appears on maps published by the Cook Islands Survey Department, based on information from the United States Navy. However, the reef isn't found on the International Hydrographic Bureau Chart of the South Pacific.

As of 1966, the island remained marked as a seamount on British naval maps. During the solar eclipse of May 30, 1965, an expedition consisting of 50 scientists watched the eclipse from a boat in the Cook Islands. During the expedition, an attempt to find Winslow Reef was undertaken, which found nothing. It was suggested afterwards that the reef, as well as other undersea structures the expeditions attempted to find, may not have existed, or if they did, that they were located far from where they were believed to be.

In 2013, a research expedition which consisted of individuals from the office of the Prime Minister of the Cook Islands, Te Ipukarea Society, Oceans 5, Pacific Islands Conservation Initiative, Cook Islands National Environment Service, and local volunteers was conducted. The expedition was attempting to map the Cook Islands and conduct reef surveys. However, the expedition was unable to find Winslow Reef. It was suggested afterwards that the island may have been incorrectly charted.

== Geography ==
Winslow Reef is a shallow platform reef. It lacks any above-water structures. Winslow Reef has also been described as a seamount.
