= Central Polynesian tropical moist forests =

Terrestrial ecoregion in central Polynesia

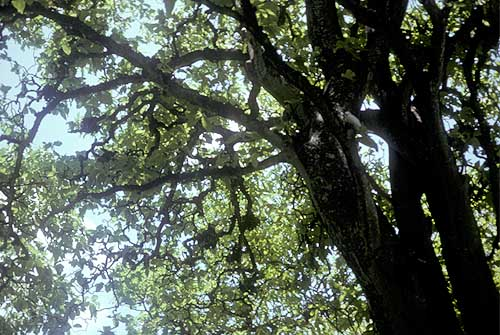
- black noddies (Anous minutus) and fairy terns (Gygis alba) nesting in the crowns of pisonia trees (Pisonia grandis) on Pig Islet, Caroline Atoll, Kiribati.

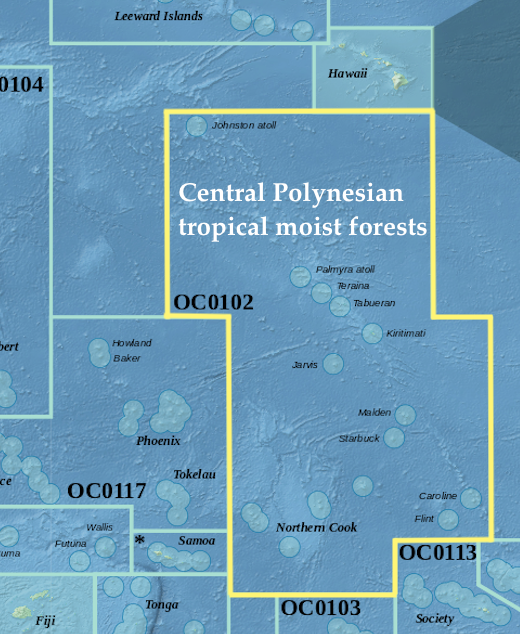
- Location of the Central Polynesian tropical moist forests

Ecology
- Realm: Oceanian
- Biome: tropical and subtropical moist broadleaf forests

Geography
- Area: 616 km^{2} (238 mi^{2})
- Countries: Cook Islands; Kiribati; United States

Conservation
- Conservation status: Critical/endangered
- Global 200: South Pacific Islands forests
- Protected: 83%

The Central Polynesian tropical moist forests is a tropical and subtropical moist broadleaf forests ecoregion in Polynesia. It includes the northern group of the Cook Islands, the Line Islands in Kiribati, and Johnston Atoll, Jarvis Island, Palmyra Atoll, and Kingman Reef which are possessions of the United States.

== Geography ==
All the islands in the ecoregion are atolls, low islands of coral sand surrounding a central lagoon. There are eight inhabited and nine uninhabited atolls.

The islands of the ecoregion are aligned from north-northwest to south-southeast for 3,400 kilometres (2,100 mi), crossing the equator. The northernmost, Johnston Atoll, is at 16°44′N latitude and 169°31′W longitude. The southernmost is Suwarrow at 13°16′S latitude and 163° 7′W longitude.

Teraina, Tabuaeran, Kiritimati, Malden, Starbuck, Vostok, Caroline, and Flint are part of Kiribati. Kingman Reef, Palmyra Atoll, and Jarvis Island are territories of the United States. Kiritimati is the largest island in the 388 square kilometres (150 sq mi).

Johnston Atoll lies northwest of the Line Islands and southwest of the Hawaiian Islands.

The Northern Cook Islands include the atolls of Pukapuka, Rakahanga, Manihiki, Penrhyn, and Suwarrow. The Southern Cook Islands are in the separate Cook Islands tropical moist forests ecoregion.

== Climate ==
The climate of the islands is tropical. Temperature is warm year-round, with little seasonal variation. The southern and northern islands are within the trade wind belt, and regularly receive 1,500 and 3,000 millimetres (59 and 118 in) of annual rainfall. The islands within 5° latitude of the equator receive less than 1,000 millimetres (39 in) annually, with periodic droughts.

== Flora ==
The native vegetation on the more humid islands is tropical atoll forest. The characteristic species are common to coastal Indo-Pacific areas, and include the trees Pisonia grandis, Calophyllum inophyllum, Heliotropium foertherianum, Pandanus tectorius, Cordia subcordata, and Guettarda speciosa, and the shrubs Morinda citrifolia, Scaevola taccada, Suriana maritima, and Pemphis acidula.

The driest and lowest islands are covered with low plants, including the grass Lepturus repens and the creepers Tribulus cistoides or Portulaca lutea, with areas of Heliotropium foertherianum, Pemphis acidula, and Scaevola taccada scrub.

== Fauna ==
The islands' vertebrate fauna is principally seabirds, which form large colonies on some islands. There are no native non-marine mammals or amphibians.

The sole passerine bird is the endemic bokikokiko (Acrocephalus aequinoctialis), a reed warbler found on Teraina, Tabuaeran, and Kiritimati. Kuhl's lorikeet (Vini kuhlii) is an endangered parrot found on Kiritimati and Teraina and on Rimatara in the Tubuai Islands to the southeast. Its range once included the Cook Islands.

== Protected areas ==
A 2017 assessment found that 83% of the ecoregion is in protected areas. protected areas include:

- Kiritimati wildlife refuge
- Suwarrow atoll
- Pacific Islands Heritage Marine National Monument protects Kingman Reef, Johnson Atoll, Jarvis Island, and Palmyra Atoll.
