= List of airports in the Cook Islands =

This is a list of airports in the Cook Islands, a self-governing country in free association with New Zealand that consists of 15 islands in the South Pacific Ocean.

== Airports ==
Locations displayed in bold have international airports. Airport names in bold indicate that it has scheduled passenger service on a commercial airline.

Location	ICAO	IATA	Airport name
Aitutaki (Araura)	NCAI	AIT	**Aitutaki Airport** (Araura Airport)
Atiu (Enua Manu)	NCAT	AIU	**Enua Airport**
Mangaia (Auau Enua)	NCMG	MGS	**Mangaia Airport**
Manihiki (Humphrey Island)	NCMH	MHX	**Manihiki Island Airport**
Mauke (Akatoka Manava)	NCMK	MUK	**Mauke Airport**
Mitiaro (Nukuroa)	NCMR	MOI	**Mitiaro Airport** (Nukuroa Airport)
Penrhyn Island (Tongareva)	NCPY	PYE	**Tongareva Airport**
Pukapuka	NCPK	PZK	**Pukapuka Island Airport**
**Rarotonga (Avarua)**	NCRG	RAR	**Rarotonga International Airport**

== See also ==
- Transport in the Cook Islands
- List of airports by ICAO code: N#NC – Cook Islands
- Wikipedia:WikiProject Aviation/Airline destination lists: Oceania#Cook Islands (New Zealand)
