= List of villages and neighbourhoods in the Cook Islands =

Below is a list of villages and neighbourhoods in the Cook Islands. There are no cities in the Cook Islands.

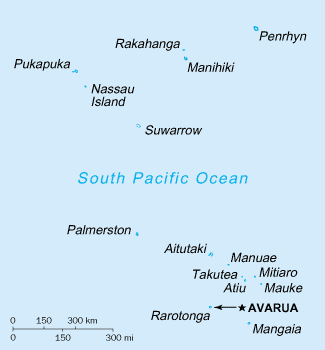
Map of the Cook Islands

- Amuri, Cook Islands
- Areora Village
- Arutanga
- Avarua (national capital, with international airport: Rarotonga International Airport)
- Avatiu
- Kimiangatau
- Loto (Pukapuka)
- Mapumai Village
- Ngake (Pukapuka)
- Ngatiarua Village
- Nikao
- Oiretumu
- Omoka
- Oneroa
- Tauhunu
- Te Tautua
- Teenui Village
- Tengatangi Village
- Tukao
- Yato (Pukapuka)
