= Education in the Cook Islands =

Education in the Cook Islands has close ties with the educational system of New Zealand. Primary and secondary education are free and attendance is compulsory for children between the ages of five and fifteen. Some degree courses are provided by the University of the South Pacific.

== History ==
Education in a Western sense began with missionaries in the early part of the 19th century. The first schools began with British missionaries from the London Missionary Society and later the Seventh-day Adventists and possibly other church groups.

Tereora College was one such school. It was an LMS school and closed early in the 1900s. Fifty years later it reopened, in 1954, as a public school.

In 1895 the New Zealand colonial authorities attempted to establish state schools for the teaching of English. Existing school buildings and staff were loaned to them for the purpose, but control was resumed by religious groups when the scheme proved a failure. In 1914 the colonial government promised to establish state-run schools, with three in Rarotonga and one in Aitutaki. Existing facilities were again expected to be handed over, with the headmaster of Avarua School supervising the others under the control of the New Zealand Education Department. Avarua would serve as a training school, to train future teachers. Headmasters and teachers for Avarua, Aorangi, and Takatumu schools were appointed by the government in 1918.

The European School, began in the 1920s. In the 1930s, it was based in the Sunday School Hall, on the seaward side of the Avarua Cook Islands Christian Church at the main town in Rarotonga. It is not known at this stage as to whether it was a London Missionary Society school or privately run. However the school closed in the 1940s.

In the late 1940s, the New Zealand administration opened the Avarua Side School, which was an adjunct school of the Avarua Maori School. In 1958, the Side School moved to Nikao and eventually in 1975, the Nikao Side School was renamed the Avatea School.

In 1975, Nukutere College, a Catholic secondary school in Avarua, commenced operations. The school has been staffed by religious and lay staff. The Christian Brothers provided staff for the college from 1976 to 2009.

== Primary and secondary education ==
The Cook Islands Ministry of Education operates 22 government schools. In addition, there are 8 private educational institutions.

== Tertiary education ==
The University of the South Pacific operates a campus on Rarotonga. Some tertiary courses are available through the Cook Islands Tertiary Training Institute.

== See also ==
- Mana Strickland
- List of schools in the Cook Islands
