= Atimono =

Island of Manihiki, Cook Islands

Coordinates: 10°26′9.18″S 160°57′18.84″W

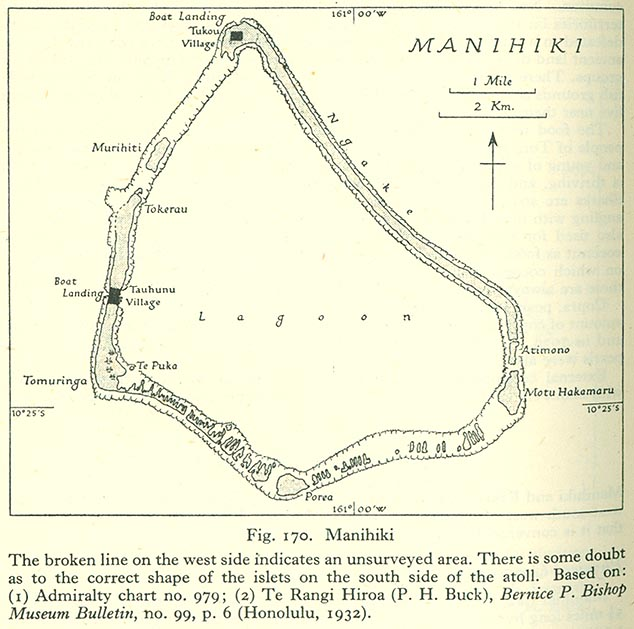
Map of Manihiki Atoll

Atimono is one of 43 islands in the Manihiki atoll of the Cook Islands. It is a small islet at the southern end of Ngake and to the north of Motu Hakamaru.
