= Porea =

Island of Manihiki, Cook Islands

Coordinates: 10°27′36.87″S 160°59′58.72″W

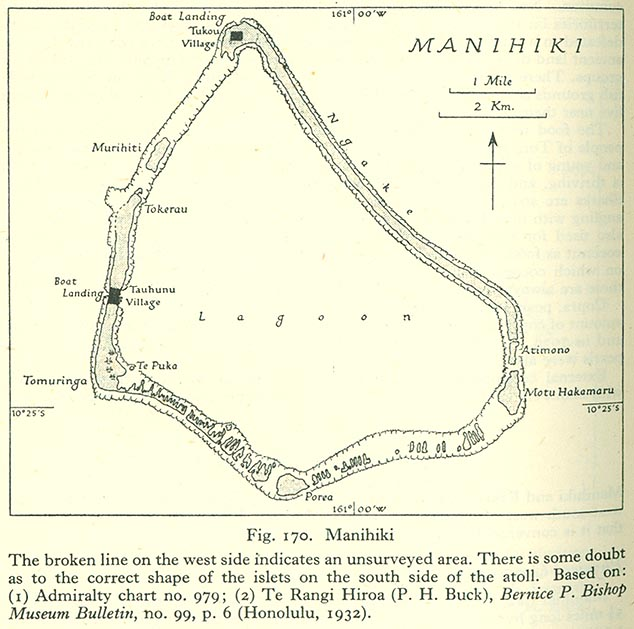
Map of Manihiki Atoll

Porea is one of 43 islands in the Manihiki atoll of the Cook Islands. It is a small islet which marks the southern edge of the atoll. It is separated from Tauhunu in the west and Motu Hakamaru by a large number of small islets.
