= Murihiti =

Island of Manihiki, Cook Islands

Coordinates: 10°23′43.69″S 161°1′30.22″W

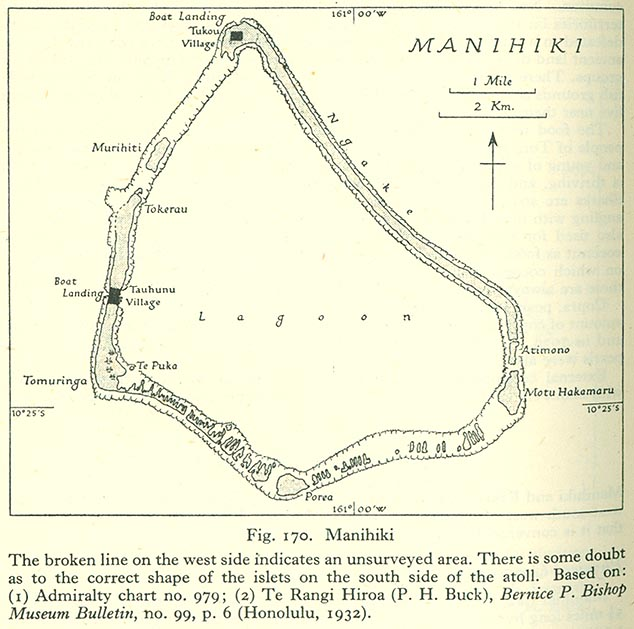
Map of Manihiki Atoll

Murihiti is one of 43 islands in the Manihiki atoll of the Cook Islands. It is a small island, in the gap in the atoll between Tauhunu and Ngake.
