= Pukapuka Island Airport =

Airport at the Pukapuka Island in Cook Islands

- IATA: PZK; ICAO: NCPK

Summary
- Operator: Cook Islands Airports
- Location: Pukapuka, Cook Islands
- Opened: 1993
- Time zone: CKT (– 10:00)
- Coordinates: 10°54′52″S 165°50′20″W
- Website: Cook Islands Airports
- Interactive map of Pukapuka Island Airport

Runways
Direction	Length		Surface
Direction	ft	m	Surface
07/25	5,085	1,550	Coral

Pukapuka Island Airport is an airport on Pukapuka in the Cook Islands (IATA: PZK, ICAO: NCPK). The airport was opened in 1993, with a compacted coral runway. The airport does not have weekly scheduled flights, but has both charter and commercial flights a couple of times a month.

== Airlines and destinations ==
Airlines	Destinations
Air Rarotonga	Rarotonga; Charter: Aitutaki, Manihiki, Rarotonga
