= List of schools in the Cook Islands =

The Cook Islands has 22 government and 8 private schools. Government schools are split into primary schools, area schools, and secondary colleges. Private schools are primarily run by churches.

== Government schools ==
=== Primary schools ===
- Araura Primary School
- Arorangi School
- Avarua School
- Avatea School
- Nikao School
- Rutaki School
- Takitumu School
- Vaitau Primary School

=== Area schools ===
- Enuamanu School
- Lucky School, Palmerston Island
- Mangaia School
- Mauke School
- Mitiaro School
- Nassau School
- Niua School
- Omoka School
- Rakahanga School
- Tauhunu School
- Tetautua School
- Tukao School

=== Secondary colleges ===
- Araura College
- Tereora College
- Titikaveka College

== Private schools ==
- Apii Te Uki Ou Primary School
- Blackrock Api’i Potiki Early Childhood Education Centre
- Creative Centre Rarotonga
- Imanuela Akatemia Area school
- Nukutere College
- Papaaroa High School
- St Joseph's Catholic Primary School
- Tekaaroa Adventist School
