= NCMR =

NCMR may refer to:

- Negotiation and Conflict Management Research, a peer-reviewed academic journal
- The ICAO airport code of Mitiaro Airport in the Cook Islands.
