= MHX =

MHX, Mhx or mhx may refer to:

- Manihiki Island Airport, Cook Islands (IATA code MHX)
- Maru language, spoken in Burma and China (ISO 639 code mhx)
- Monster Hunter X, a video game
