= Air Rarotonga =

Airline based in Rarotonga, Cook Islands

IATA	ICAO	Call sign
GZ	RAR	Rarotonga
- Founded: 1978; 48 years ago
- Hubs: Rarotonga International Airport
- Focus cities: Aitutaki Airport, Faaʼa International Airport
- Fleet size: 7
- Destinations: 9
- Headquarters: Rarotonga, Cook Islands
- Key people: Sir Ewan Smith
- Website: airraro.com

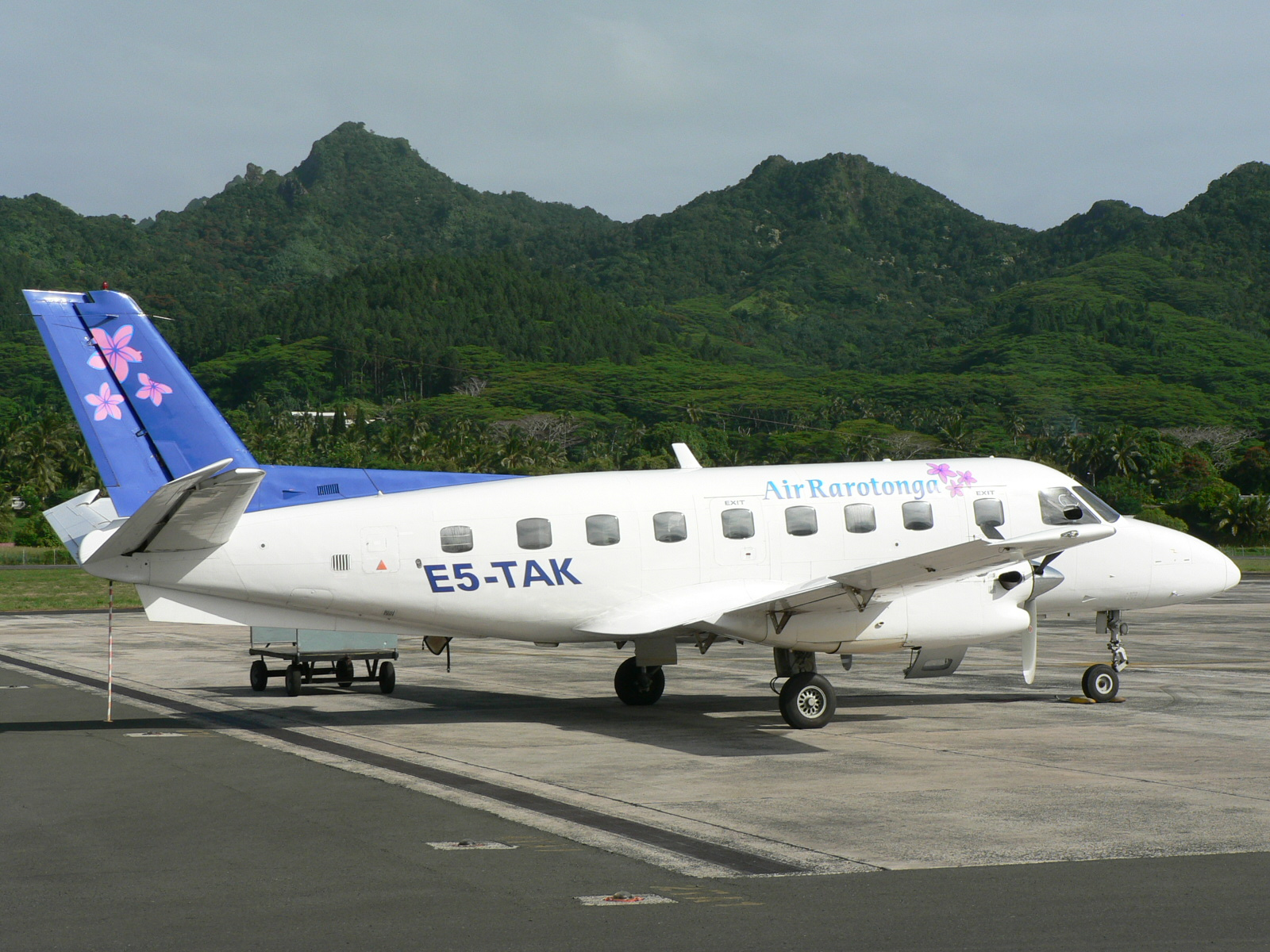
Air Rarotonga Embraer 110 at Rarotonga International Airport (2012)

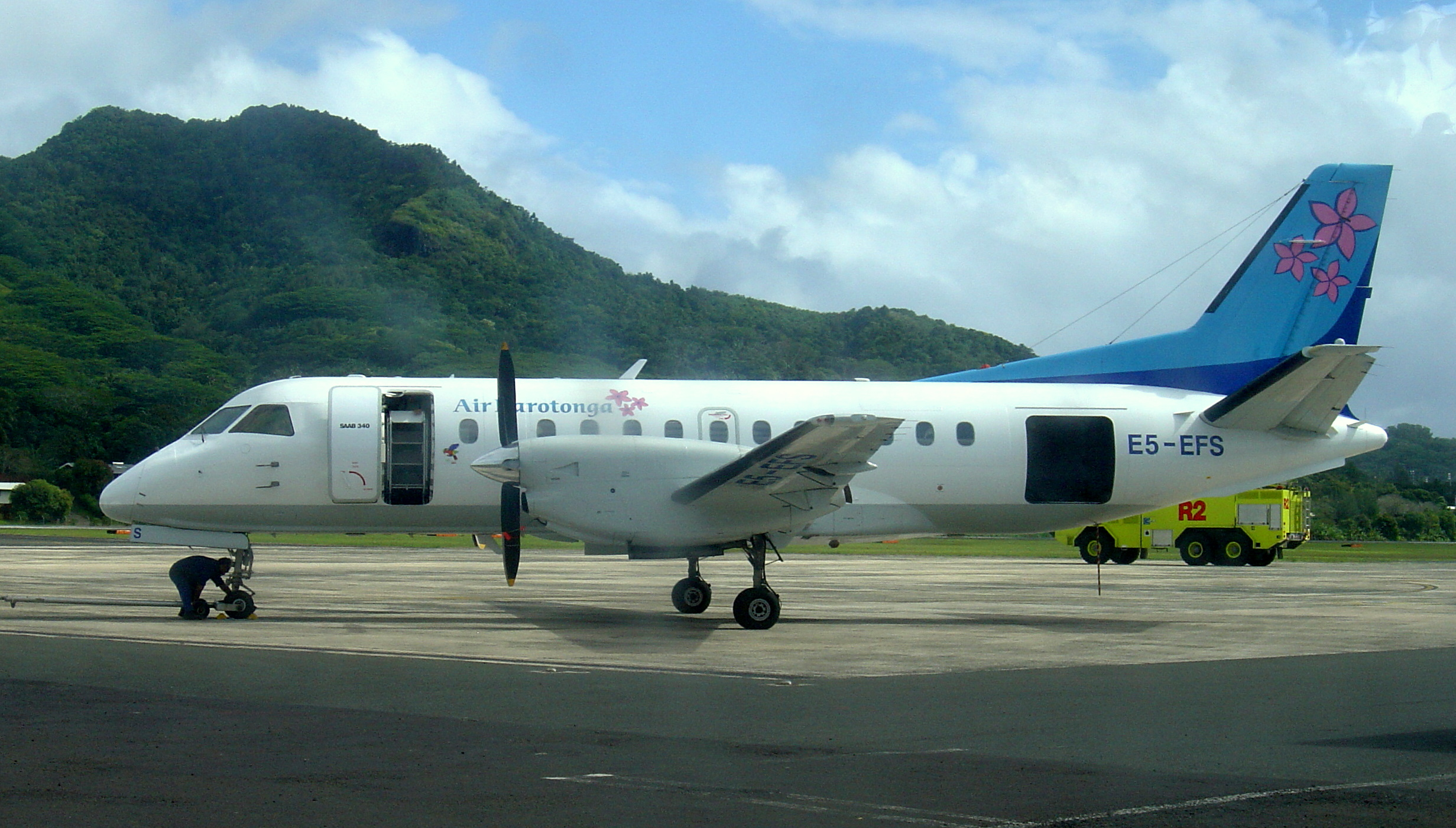
Air Rarotonga Saab 340 on the tarmac at Rarotonga International Airport

Air Rarotonga route map as of February 2008

Air Rarotonga is an airline based in Rarotonga, Cook Islands. It is the flag carrier of the country, known by its slogan 'the Airline of the Cook Islands'. It operates inter-island and regional scheduled services throughout the Cook Islands and to Tahiti. It also operates chartered flights to French Polynesia, Niue, Samoa, Kiribati and Tonga. Its headquarters and hub is at Rarotonga International Airport.

== History ==
The airline was established in February 1978 and started operations in July 1978 with a Cessna 337 aircraft. The company is owned by three private investors. More than 120,000 passengers travel between its island destinations each year.

== Destinations ==
The following is a list of destinations Air Rarotonga flies to as part of its scheduled services, as of October 2018.

Hub

City	Country	IATA	ICAO	Airport	Refs and Notes
Aitutaki	Cook Islands	AIT	NCAI	Aitutaki Airport	
Atiu	Cook Islands	AIU	NCAT	Enua Airport	
Mangaia	Cook Islands	MGS	NCMG	Mangaia Airport	
Manihiki	Cook Islands	MHX	NCMH	Manihiki Island Airport	
Mauke	Cook Islands	MUK	NCMK	Mauke Airport	
Mitiaro	Cook Islands	MOI	NCMR	Mitiaro Airport	
Penrhyn Island	Cook Islands	PYE	NCPY	Tongareva Airport	
Pukapuka	Cook Islands	PZK	NCPK	Pukapuka Island Airport	
Tahiti	French Polynesia	PPT	NTAA	Faa'a International Airport	
Rarotonga	Cook Islands	RAR	NCRG	Rarotonga International Airport	

Since August 2022, Air Rarotonga operates international flights to Tahiti using their own aircraft as well as code shared flights operated by Air Tahiti. Air Rarotonga also code shares with Air New Zealand for flights between Rarotonga and Aitutaki, with Air Rarotonga being the operator. The Airline also maintains Interline Agreements with Air Tahiti Nui, Alaska Airlines and Hawaiian Airlines.

The airline offers scenic flights over Rarotonga and air charter services to neighbouring Pacific Island countries including Tahiti, Niue, Tonga, Samoa, Fiji and Kiribati. The airline operates air ambulance evacuations from all island airports in the Cook Islands and on to Auckland when required.

== Fleet ==
As of May 2026, the Air Rarotonga fleet includes the following aircraft.

Air Rarotonga fleet
Aircraft	Total	Orders	Passengers (Economy)
Saab 340B+	2	1	34
Embraer EMB-110P1 Bandeirante	2	0	15
Cessna Citation II	1	0	8
Cessna 172	1	0	2
Total	6	1	

The airline added its first jet, the Cessna Citation II, to their fleet in February 2017.
