= Te Puka =

Island of Manihiki, Cook Islands

Coordinates: 10°26′17″S 161°1′59″W

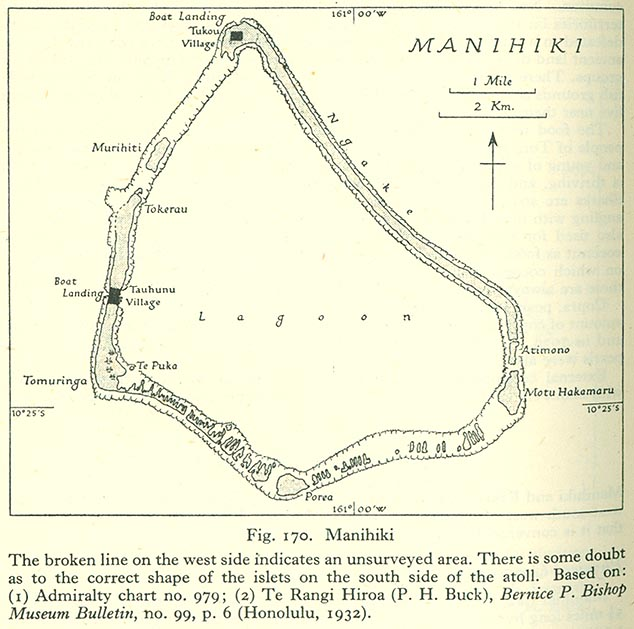
Map of Manihiki Atoll

Te Puka is one of 43 islands in the Manihiki atoll of the Cook Islands. It is a small islet in the south-west corner of the atoll, just inside the reef from Tauhunu.
