= List of lakes of the Cook Islands =

This is a list of lakes in the Cook Islands.

== Lakes ==
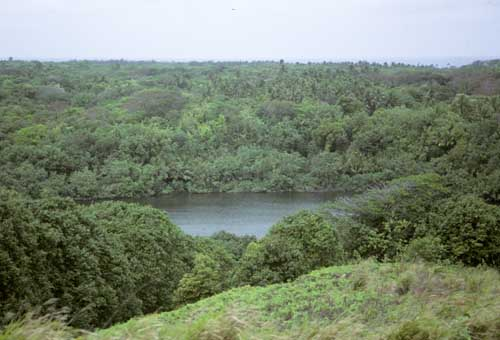
Lake Tiroto, on Atiu Island

=== Atiu ===
- Lake Tiroto

=== Mangaia ===
- Lake Tiriara

=== Mitiaro ===
- Rotonui (big lake)
- Rotoiti (small lake)
