= Mana Strickland =

Cook Islands politician and educator

Mana Strickland BEM

First Minister of Education of the Cook Islands
- In office 4 August 1965 – Unknown

Te Ariki Terau Mana Strickland BEM (22 June 1918 – 8 December 1996) was a Cook Island educator and politician. He was the Minister of Education in the first Cook Islands government after self-government was obtained in 1965.

Strickland was born in Mangaia. He was a teacher and taught at schools in Pukapuka, Mauke, Aitutaki, and Rarotonga. Eventually he became the headmaster at Avarua School, the largest primary school in the Cook Islands. Strickland was also a lecturer at the Cook Islands Teachers' College. As a teacher, he wrote language instruction books on Cook Islands Māori.

Strickland was a member of the Legislative Assembly of the Cook Islands prior to self-government. He was elected to the Parliament of the Cook Islands in the 1965 election as a representative of the Cook Islands Party (CIP). When the Cook Islands Constitution entered into force on 4 August 1965, Strickland became the self-governing country's first Minister of Education.

Strickland was a first cousin to Albert Henry, the Cook Islands' first premier. Strickland resigned from CIP and the Cabinet in 1968 to protest what he viewed as mismanagement of the government by Henry. Strickland joined the United Cook Islanders party and served in the parliamentary opposition after the 1968 election.

Strickland was a prominent member of the Seventh-day Adventist Church in the Cook Islands and was active in community affairs, being the chairman of the Cooperative Movement and the chairman of the Cook Islands Thrift and Loan Society. He was awarded the British Empire Medal in 1989 and an honorary master's degree from the University of the South Pacific in 1995.

Strickland married Mauariki Roi in 1938 and was the father of eight children.

== Publications ==
- Mana Strickland (1968). Colonialism and self-government exemplified by events in the Cook Islands. (Rarotonga).
- —— (1979). Say it in Rarotongan : an Instant Introduction to the Common Language of the Cook Islands (Sydney: Pacific Publications, ISBN 0-85807-041-3)
- —— "Self-Government and the New Colonialism" in Ron Crocombe (ed) (1979). Cook Islands Politics : The Inside Story (Polynesian Press, Auckland, ISBN 0-908597-00-2)
