= Tukao =

Village in Manihiki, Cook Islands

Coordinates: 10°22′30.84″S 161°0′37.75″W

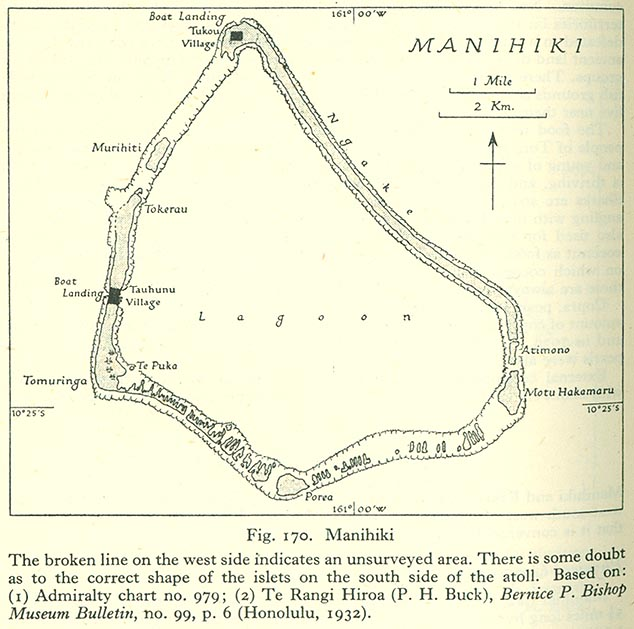
Map of Manihiki Atoll

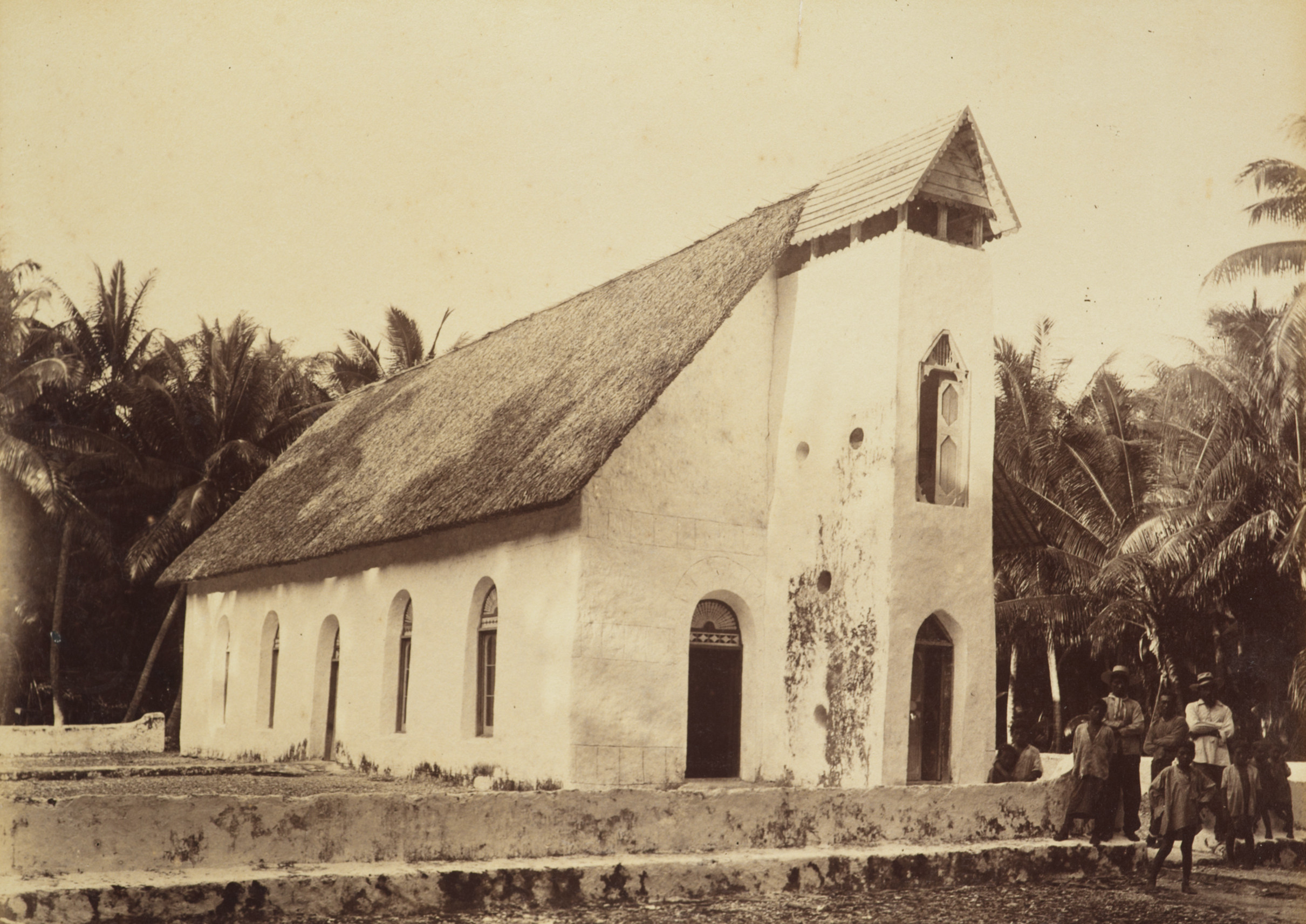
Tukao Church in Manihiki, 1886

Tukao (previously known as Te Matafourua) is a village on Manihiki atoll in the Cook Islands. The village is at the northern tip of the islet of Ngake, which runs along the northern-eastern side of the atoll.

The village is home to Tukao School and is powered by the 136 kW Tukao solar farm. Tukao is one of two main towns in Manihiki, the other being Tauhunu
