= Anatakitaki Cave =

Karst cave in Atiu, Cook Islands

Coordinates: 19°59′S 158°07′W

- Cave of the Kopekas
- Interactive map of Anatakitaki Cave
- Location: Atiu
- Length: 1 km

Anatakitaki Cave, or the Cave of the Kopekas, is a karst cave located in the northeast of Atiu, Cook Islands. The cave is a large solutional cave, with many offshoot chambers and passages. A freshwater lake is to be found at the base of the cave. The Tiroto Tunnel connects this lake to the Pacific Ocean, and can be waded along until the last portion which is totally submerged. There is a great array of all sorts of speleothems decorating the cave throughout its length. The cave's alternate name comes from its population of Atiu swiftlets, which roost in the cave in vast numbers. They never land outside of the cave, and use echolocation just like bats. Roots, mainly from banyan trees, permeate the cave to its furthest depths.
