= Mapumai Swamp =

Wetland in the Cook Islands

- Location: Cook Islands
- Coordinates: 19°58′56″S 158°6′45″W
- Type: Swamp

Location
- Interactive map of Mapumai Swamp

Mapumai Swamp is the largest wetland in the Cook Islands. It is located in the north of Atiu, on the edge of the volcanic area. Its flora is dominated by Cladium, giant bullrush, and Azolla filiculoides.
