= Lake Tiroto =

Lake in Atiu, Cook Islands

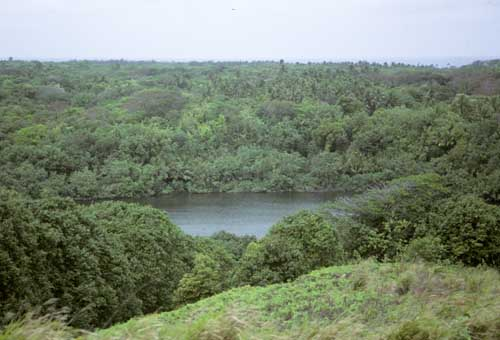
- Lake Tiroto on Atiu Island

- Location within Pacific Ocean
- Location: Atiu Island
- Coordinates: 20.0096°S 158.1238°W
- Basin countries: Cook Islands

Lake Tiroto is a lake on the island of Atiu, part of the Cook Islands archipelago. According to legend, the eel Rauou dug the lake before travelling to Mitiaro to dig lakes there. The lake is connected to the sea by a tunnel under the makatea.

== See also ==
- List of lakes in the Cook Islands
