= Teenui Village =

Village on Atiu in the Cook Islands

Coordinates: 20°00′S 158°07′W

Teenui-Kurukava is a village on Atiu in the Cook Islands.

The village of Teenui has a population of 107. Enua Airport and Atiu Harbour are located in the village. Teenui also contains one of the largest churches in the Cook Islands, Cook Islands Christian Church.
