= Rongomatane Ngaakaara Ariki =

Rongomatane Ngaakaara Ariki was an ariki of the island of Atiu in the Cook Islands. He established Atiuan domination over the neighbouring islands of Mitiaro, and Mauke through a succession of raids. He was converted to Christianity in 1823 by John Williams of the London Missionary Society, and showed him the way to Rarotonga.

Rongomatane Ngaakaara was a son of Tinokura, the first Rongomatane, and a grandson of Te Ruaautu, who had first united Atiu. When an Atiuan chief was killed by a chief from Mauke, he sailed to Mauke with a fleet of eighty war canoes. The Mauke people fled, but were dragged from their hiding places and forced to dig earth ovens, before being killed, dismembered, cooked, and eaten. Ngaakaara then returned to Atiu, leaving one of his own men, Tararo, in charge. When Tararo was overthrown, Ngaakaara returned and again killed, cooked and ate the rebels, though this time women and children were spared. Between these two expeditions he had also conquered Mitiaro in another raid, and subsequently the ariki of both islands were subordinate to those of Atiu.

Rongomatane Ngaakaara greeted John Williams' ship when it arrived at Atiu. After discussion with Tamatoa Ariki of Aitutaki, who was accompanying Williams, he converted to Christianity and agreed to destroy Atiu's religious symbols. He then accompanied Williams to Mauke and Mitiaro and enforced similar changes there. After returning to Atiu, he showed Williams the course to take to Rarotonga.

After his death the Rongomatane title passed to Mana Rongomatane.
