= Enuamanu School =

School in the Cook Islands

- Apii Enuamanu

Location
- 19°59′18.08″S 158°7′14.1″W

Information
- Established: 1965
- Principal: Syaka Talagi-Tairi
- Years offered: ECE – 13
- Gender: Coeducational
- Enrolment: 109

Enuamanu School or Apii Enuamanu is a co-educational school in Mapumai Village on the island of Atiu in the Cook Islands. It runs classes for early childhood education through to year 13, including levels 1–3 of the New Zealand National Certificate of Educational Achievement.

The school was established in 1965 as Atiu Junior High School. It was renamed Atiu College in 1975 and then Enuamanu School in 1988.

In 2015 the school launched a radio station, Atiu 100FM.
