= Mapumai Village =

Coordinates: 19°59′S 158°07′W

Mapumai Village Mapumai-Nui-O-Ruavari
- Village
- Interactive map of Mapumai Village
- Country: Cook Islands
- Island: Aitu

Population
  - Total: 120

Mapumai Village (Mapumai-Nui-O-Ruavari), is a village on Atiu in the Cook Islands. On Atiu, Mapumai Village plays an important role, because it houses Enuamanu School, radio Atiu, Telecom, Te po Nui and more. The people of Mapumai are known to be the fun village. The population of Mapumai is 120 people, who live and stay in the village.
