= Mangaia Airport =

Airport in Mangaia, Cook Islands

- IATA: MGS; ICAO: NCMG

Summary
- Location: Mangaia
- Elevation AMSL: 45 ft (14 m)
- Coordinates: 21°53′45″S 157°54′24″W
- Website: Cook Islands Airports
- Interactive map of Mangaia Airport

Runways
| Direction | Length | | Surface |
| Direction | ft | m | Surface |
|---|---|---|---|
| 15/33 | 3,274 | 998 | unpaved |

Mangaia Airport (IATA: MGS, ICAO: NCMG) is an airport on Mangaia in the Cook Islands. It lies 45 feet (14 m) above mean sea level. In 2007, the airport received $5 million for development.

== Airlines and destinations ==
Air Rarotonga connects Mangaia Airport to Rarotonga International Airport.

The Air Rarotonga Rarotonga connection is operated three days a week.
