= Areora Village =

Areora Village Te-Are-O-Tangaroa
- Village
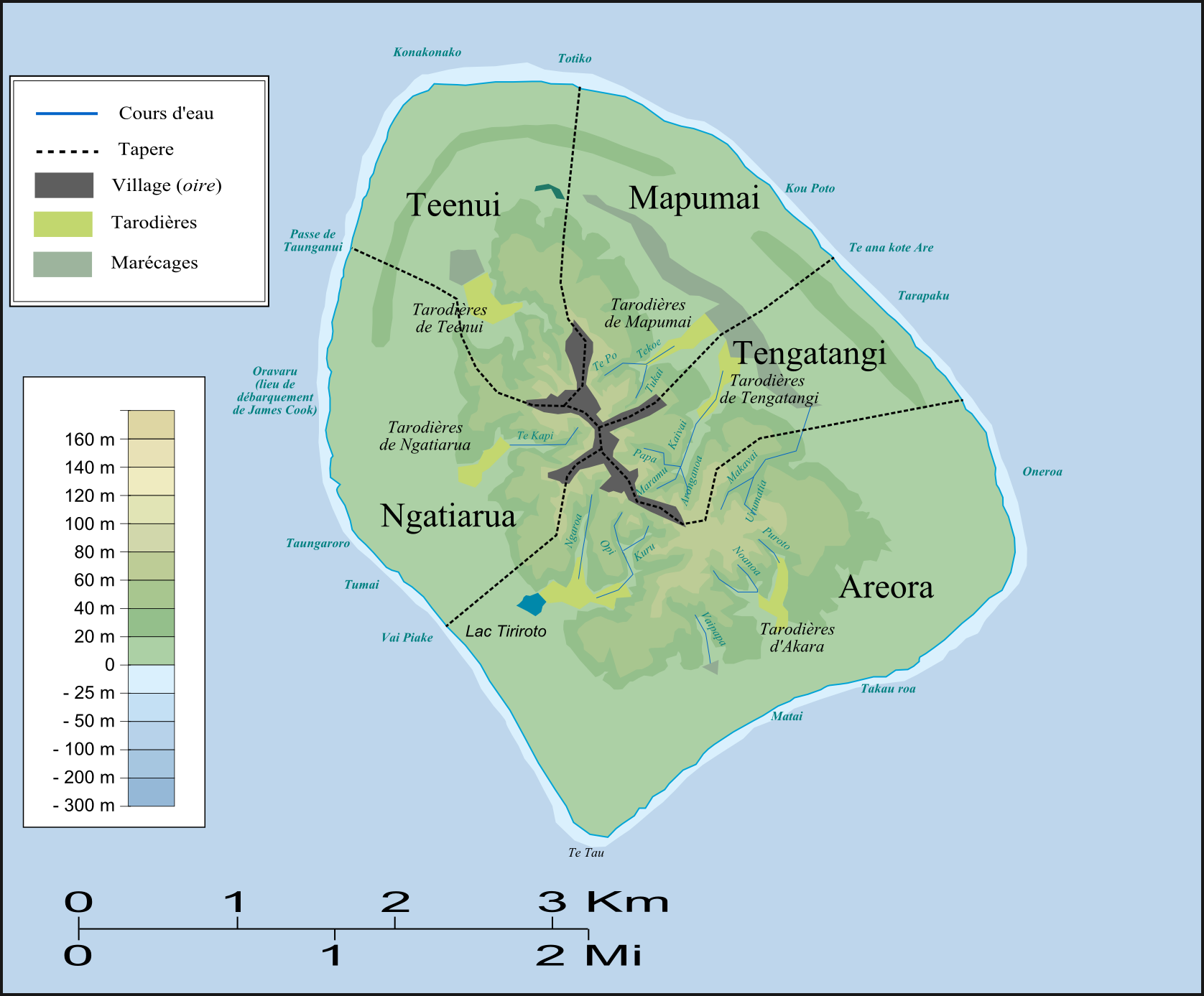
- Map of Aitu showing Areora Village
- Coordinates: 19°59′S 158°07′W
- Country: Cook Islands
- Island: Aitu

Areora Village (Te-Are-O-Tangaroa), is a village on Atiu in the Cook Islands.

== Etymology ==
The name Areora refers to the story behind the name of the village. "Are" means house and "Ora" means the lies of the chief. A carpenter lies to chief Tangaroa that the meeting house of the chief is completely finished. The chief looks at the house, one side of the house is long and the other side is short. Because the carpenter doesn't know what to say, he finds something to make the chief happy. So he said to the chief: "The short side of the house is for the chief Tangaroa and his family, the long side of the house is for the people of Areora". When the carpenters explain this to the chief he was totally happy, so the chief didn't kill the carpenter.
