= Tengatangi Village =

Tengatangi
- Location within Cook Islands
- Coordinates: 20°00′S 158°07′W
- Country: Cook Islands
- Island: Atiu

Tengatangi (Taturoa) is a village on Atiu in the Cook Islands. It forms part of the Tengatangi–Areora–Ngatiarua electoral division.
