= Mauke Airport =

Airport in Mauke, Cook Islands

Coordinates: 20°08′12″S 157°20′41″W

- IATA: MUK; ICAO: NCMK

Summary
- Hub for: {Air Rarotonga
- Website: Cook Islands Airports
- Interactive map of Mauke Airport

Runways
Direction	Length		Surface
Direction	ft	m	Surface
28/10	5,216	1,590	Coral

Mauke Airport is an airport on Mauke in the Cook Islands (IATA: MUK, ICAO: NCMK).

== Airlines and destinations ==
Air Rarotonga connects Mauke Airport to Mitiaro Airport and Rarotonga International Airport.
