= Manihiki =

Atoll in the northern Cook Islands

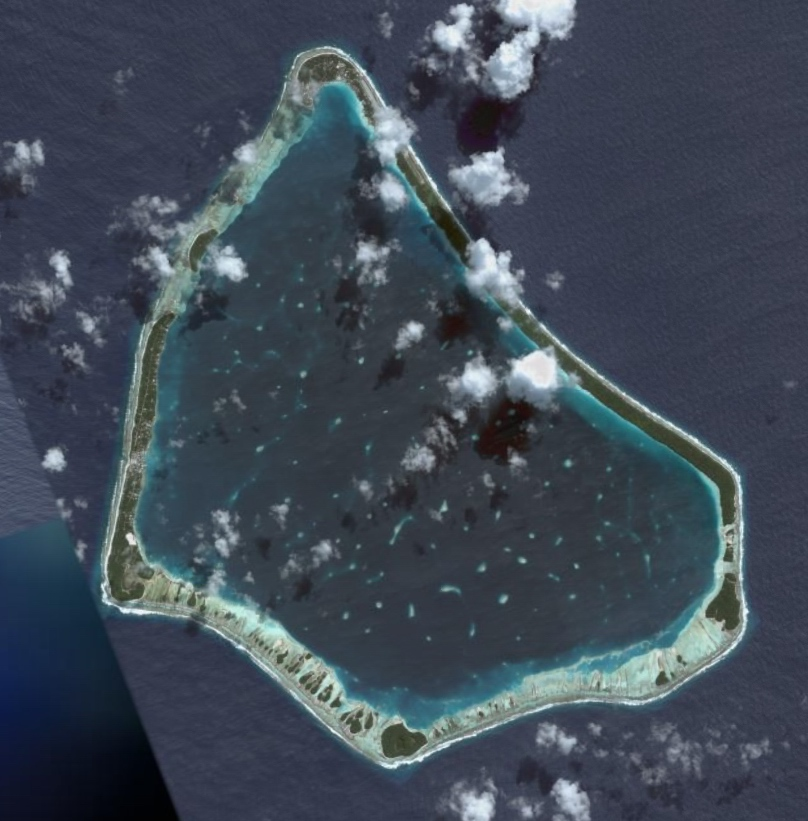
- NASA picture of Manihiki
- Interactive map of Manihiki

Geography
- Location: Central-Southern Pacific Ocean
- Coordinates: 10°24′S 161°00′W
- Archipelago: Cook Islands
- Total islands: 43
- Major islands: Tauhunu, Tukao
- Area: 4 km^{2} (1.5 sq mi)

Administration
- Cook Islands
- Largest settlement: Tauhunu

Demographics
- Population: 215
- Ethnic groups: Nu-matua, Tia-ngaro-tonga

Location of Manihiki in the Pacific Ocean

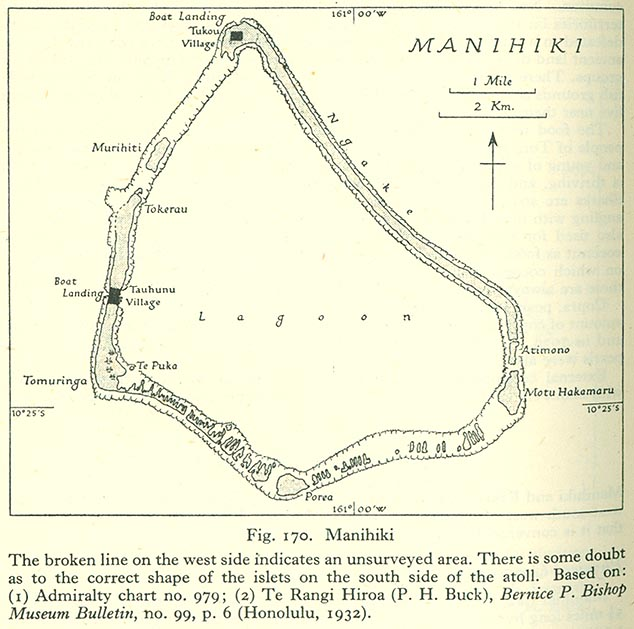
Map of Manihiki Atoll

Manihiki is an atoll in the northern group of the Cook Islands known informally as the "Island of Pearls". It is located in the Northern Cook Island chain, approximately 1,299 kilometres (807 mi) north of the capital island of Rarotonga, making it one of the most remote inhabitations in the Pacific Ocean. Its name has two possible meanings: It is believed that the original name of the island was Manuhiki, or Manuhikitanga inspired by the aboriginal discoverers, Manu coming from the word Rua Manu (a kind of canoe) and Hiki meaning ashore, so the literal translation would be canoe carried ashore. The second interpretation is that the original discoverers were from Manihi, an island in Tuamotus, so the name of the island would mean Little Manihi.

== Geography ==
Manihiki is a roughly triangular-shaped coral atoll, consisting of approximately 43 islets (motu) surrounding a deep, nine kilometer wide lagoon, which is almost completely enclosed by the surrounding reef. The atoll is located on top of an underwater mountain rising 4,000 meters (13,000 ft) from the ocean floor. The inhabitants are divided between the two main islets of Tauhunu on the west coast (where the government administration is based) and Tukao in the north, (where Manihiki Island Airport is located). Each settlement has a school, churches, stores and a few pickup trucks. The total land area is approximately 4 square kilometres (1.5 sq mi).

The major islands of the atoll (listed starting clockwise from the northernmost point of the atoll) are:

- Ngake
- Atimono
- Motu Hakamaru
- Porea
- Te Puka
- Tauhunu
- Murihiti

== History ==
Polynesians are believed to have lived on Manihiki since at least 900 or 1000 AD. According to local folklore, the atoll was discovered by Huku, a fisherman from Rarotonga, who noted a shallow area of sea and claimed it as his fishing ground. Later, this area was fished up by Māui, becoming the atoll of Rakahanga. Huku then returned and fought Māui for the land he considered to be his. Māui was driven off, but during the struggle part of the new land broke away, becoming the atoll of Manihiki. Another legend says that Kupe, the explorer of Aotearoa, came from Manihiki, also known as Fakahotu Nui, or Niiva Nui. His canoe was named by the ancient name of Tukao Village known as Te Matafourua. On his return from Aotearoa he renamed the Marae in the Village of Tukao (Te Matafourua) Te Puna Ruki o Toi Tu Rahui Te Rautea as Te Hono O Kupe Ki Aotea, shortened as Te Marae Hono.

Manihiki was originally used as a food supply by the inhabitants of nearby Rakahanga. Every few years the entire community would make the dangerous inter-atoll crossing, allowing the vacated atoll to restore. While they lived together in a single village on Rakahanga, when on Manihiki, the tribal groupings lived on separate motus under their ariki in separate villages.

It is believed that Pedro Fernandes de Queirós first sighted the island in 1606 and called it Gente Hermosa (Beautiful People). However, on 13 October 1822, when it was sighted by the U.S. ship Good Hope it was named Humphrey Island by Captain Patrickson. In 1828 the whaleship Ganges spotted the island and named it Great Ganges Island, as other whaleships named it Liderous, Gland, Sarah Scott and Pescado. Despite repeated renaming by explorers, the island now retains its aboriginal name.

In 1889, a portion of the population opposed missionaries and made an agreement with French colonial authorities stationed in Tahiti to annex the island. In response a ship was sent, but the missionaries on Manihiki hoisted the British flag, causing the ship to withdraw without sending a landing party.

The island was claimed by the United States under the Guano Islands Act, but the United States never acted on this claim, and the island was proclaimed a British protectorate by Commander A. C. Clarke, captain of HMS Espiegle on 9 August 1889. It was placed under the administration of New Zealand with the rest of the Cook Islands in 1901. Per the 1980 Cook Islands – United States Maritime Boundary Treaty the United States recognized Cook Islands sovereignty over Manihiki and three other islands.

In August 1963, a small boat, Tearoha, set sail from Manihiki to Rakahanga for food. On leaving Rakahanga on 15 August 1963, the boat was blown off course in a storm, and eventually came to land again on 17 October 1963, at Erromango in Vanuatu. Four of the seven men on board survived to arrive at Erromango, but one of them died soon after. Teehu Makimare, of Tauhunu village, was later awarded the gold medal of the Royal Humane Society of New Zealand for his leadership and courage in this epic unintended voyage. The story has been told in Barry Wynne's book, The Man Who Refused to Die. The Original Chief (Ariki) is known to be the Whakaheo Ariki. It is believed that the Whaingaitu Ariki title were the family of which were prayer warriors of the Whakaheo. In later years, families have been fighting for positions and titles of the land. It is believed that the first born daughters of the Whakaheo were not to succeed to Ariki, this title was given to the first born son. The title of the first born daughter is known as Whakatapairu.

In 1997 Cyclone Martin devastated Manihiki. Almost every building on the island was destroyed by the storm surge, 10 people were killed, and 10 more persons reported missing and were later declared dead by the Cook Islands Coroner. 360 people were evacuated to Rarotonga, with most never returning. Martin was the deadliest known tropical cyclone to affect the Cook Islands in over a century, after it caused 19 deaths within the Islands.

In February 2009, the mayor of Manihiki, Kora Kora, stated that the world economic crisis had driven up the price of essential goods to such an extent that it was provoking significant emigration to New Zealand and Australia. He said that the population of Manihiki at that stage was just 280.

== Demographics ==
=== Villages ===
Historical population
Year	Pop.	±%
1849	1,200	—
1906	521	−56.6%
1911	444	−14.8%
1916	493	+11.0%
1921	432	−12.4%
1936	487	+12.7%
1951	816	+67.6%
1961	1,006	+23.3%
1966	584	−41.9%
1976	266	−54.5%
1986	508	+91.0%
1996	668	+31.5%
2001	515	−22.9%
2006	356	−30.9%
2011	239	−32.9%
2016	212	−11.3%
2021	215	+1.4%
Source:"Ethnology of Manihiki and Rakahanga". New Zealand Electronic Text Centre.

There are two villages: the larger village is Tauhunu which is on the Islet of Tauhunu on the western rim of the atoll. The second village, Tukao and also known in the olden days as Te Matafourua, is at the northern tip of Ngake or Te Paeroa motu, which runs along the northern-eastern side of the atoll. The island is politically controlled by the Island Councils and a Mayor elected every three years by the inhabitants.

=== Tribes ===
The atoll is inhabited by two Fakaheo tribes, the Matakeinanga and Tukufare. Each tribe has 7 subtribes or groups:

Matakeinanga	Tukufare
Nu-matua	Te-pu-tauhunu; Purenga; Kaupapa; Hitiki; Popo-iti; Nga-hoe-e-fa; Fati-kaua
Tia-ngaro-Tonga	Vai-a-Matua; Ngaro-Tapaha; Nga-fare-ririki; Tuteru-matua; Tianeva-matua; Tihauma; Hua-tane

The languages spoken on the island are Rakahanga-Manihiki and English.

== Economy ==
The economy of Manihiki is dominated by the cultivation of black pearls and there are pearl farms dotted around the lagoon. Tourism provides a secondary source of income, although facilities are rudimentary. The reef provides excellent swimming and snorkeling among colourful tropical fish and coral, making scuba diving a major attraction for visitors. Visitors are allowed to snorkel or free-dive but not scuba dive without a permit. Visitors can obtain a permit at the administration office either from the Island Secretary or the Mayor or the Deputy Mayor. There is good fishing in the open waters beyond the reef, including catches of Yellow-fin Tuna and Flying fish. Tours of the pearl farms can also be arranged.

Flying time to the island by Air Rarotonga takes about three and a half hours, and there is a flight every 2nd week Thursday from Rarotonga; however, flights are sometimes cancelled due to lack of passengers or lack of fuel at Manihiki.

The Tukao solar farm and Tauhunu solar farm provide 136 kW and 147 kW respectively.
