= Ngatiarua Village =

Coordinates: 20°00′S 158°07′W

Ngatiarua (Mokoero-Nui-O-Tautipa) is a village on the island of Atiu in the Cook Islands. Ngatiarua is the island's biggest village. 32 people live in the village. The village chief is Ngamaru Ariki. Lake Tiroto hospital is located there and it also has a meeting house. It is the centre of the Ngatiarua district.
