= Ngake =

Largest island of Manihiki, Cook Islands

Coordinates: 10°22′50″S 160°59′59″W

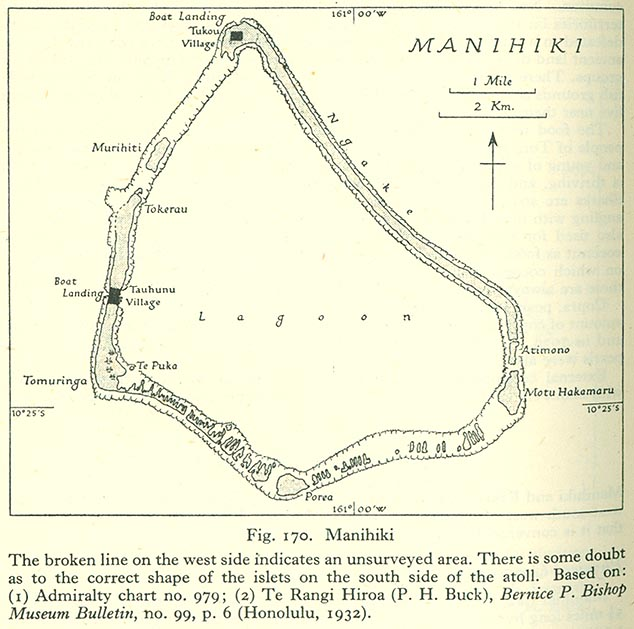
Map of Manihiki Atoll

Ngake is one of 43 islands in the Manihiki atoll of the Cook Islands. It is the largest island, making up almost the entire north-eastern side of the atoll. The village of Tukao and Manihiki Island Airport are both located on the island.
