= Motu Hakamaru =

Island of Manihiki, Cook Islands

Coordinates: 10°26′34.55″S 160°57′20.54″W

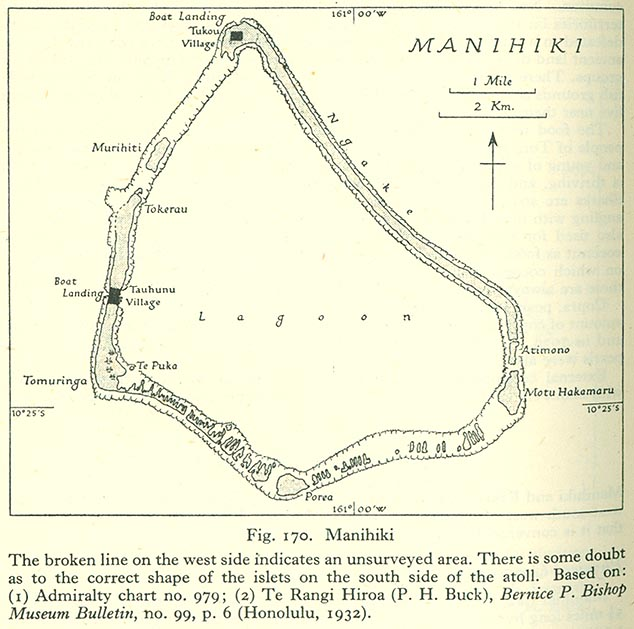
Map of Manihiki Atoll

Motu Hakamaru is one of 43 islands in the Manihiki atoll of the Cook Islands. It is a small islet and marks the south-eastern corner of the atoll.
