= Mitiaro Airport =

Airport in Mitiaro, Cook Islands

Mitiaro Airport Nukuroa Airport
- IATA: MOI; ICAO: NCMR

Summary
- Location: Mitiaro in the Cook Islands
- Elevation AMSL: 25 ft (7.6 m)
- Coordinates: 19°50′35″S 157°42′12″W
- Website: Cook Islands Airports
- Interactive map of Mitiaro Airport

Runways
Direction	Length		Surface
Direction	ft	m	Surface
11/29	4,900	1,500	rolled gravel/coral
09/27	4,280	1,300	disused

Mitiaro Airport (also known as Nukuroa Airport) (IATA: MOI, ICAO: NCMR) is an airport on Mitiaro in the Cook Islands.

== Airlines and destinations ==
Air Rarotonga connects Mitiaro Airport to Mauke Airport and Rarotonga International Airport.

Three flights per week are available to Rarotonga.
