= Enua Airport =

- IATA: AIU; ICAO: NCAT

Summary
- Location: Atiu, Cook Islands
- Opened: 1978
- Time zone: CKT (– 10:00)
- Coordinates: 19°58′04″S 158°07′12″W
- Website: Cook Islands Airports

Map
- Location within Cook Islands

Runways
Direction	Length		Surface
Direction	ft	m	Surface
1	3,947	1,203	Coral

Enua Airport (IATA: AIU, ICAO: NCAT) is an airport in Atiu in the Cook Islands. It is the second airport built on the island. An original grass airstrip near Areora was opened in 1977. The present airport, with a compacted coral runway, was opened in 1983.

== Airlines and destinations ==
Air Rarotonga connects Enua Airport to Aitutaki Airport and Rarotonga International Airport.
