= Aitutaki Airport =

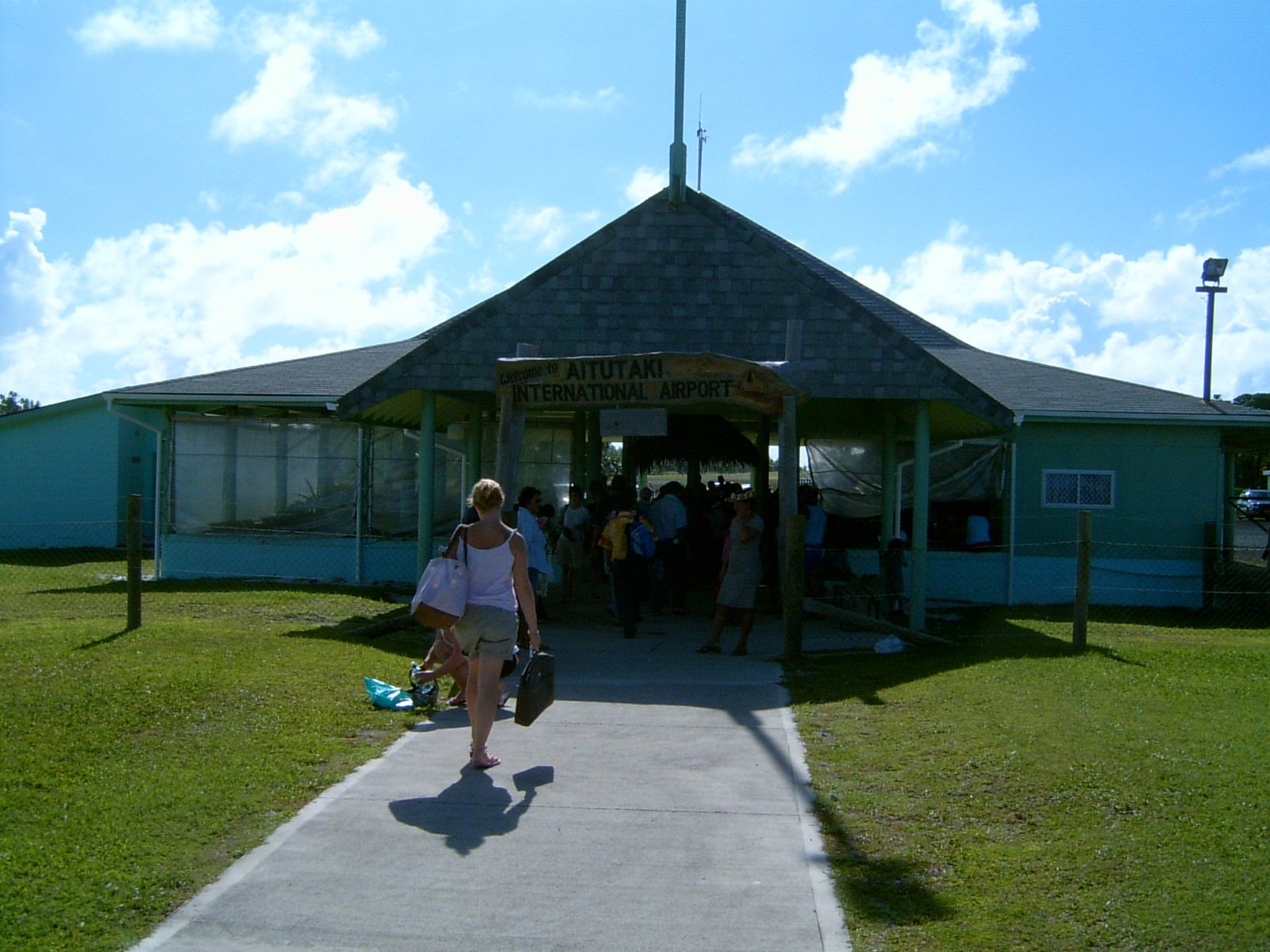
- Entrance to the airport with a sign saying "Aitutaki International Airport", although there are no international flights
- IATA: AIT; ICAO: NCAI

Summary
- Airport type: Domestic, public
- Serves: Aitutaki
- Location: Aitutaki, Cook Islands
- Elevation AMSL: 14 ft (4.3 m)
- Coordinates: 18°49′51″S 159°45′51″W
- Website: Cook Islands Airports
- Interactive map of Aitutaki Airport

Runways
Direction	Length		Surface
Direction	m	ft	Surface
~~09/27~~	~~1,388~~	~~4,555~~	~~Coral~~
14/32	1,804	5,920	Asphalt

Aitutaki Airport is the airport for Aitutaki, one of the Cook Islands (IATA: AIT, ICAO: NCAI). The airport was originally constructed by the United States and New Zealand militaries during World War II. The runway was sealed in 2003, with the seal rejuvenated in 2012. As of 2025, it is planned to lengthen and widen the runway. The airport has no aircraft refueling services.

The terminal building at Aitutaki Airport is a roof with no or few windows. There is a small convenience stall where snacks and drinks can be purchased. Resort meet-and-greet stalls are also inside the terminal. Air Rarotonga serves Aitutaki with Saab 340A and Embraer Bandeirante aircraft.

== Airlines and destinations ==
Air Rarotonga connects Aitutaki Airport to Enua Airport (Atiu) and Rarotonga International Airport.
