= Rarotonga International Airport =

Rarotonga International Airport Papa Rererangi o Rarotonga
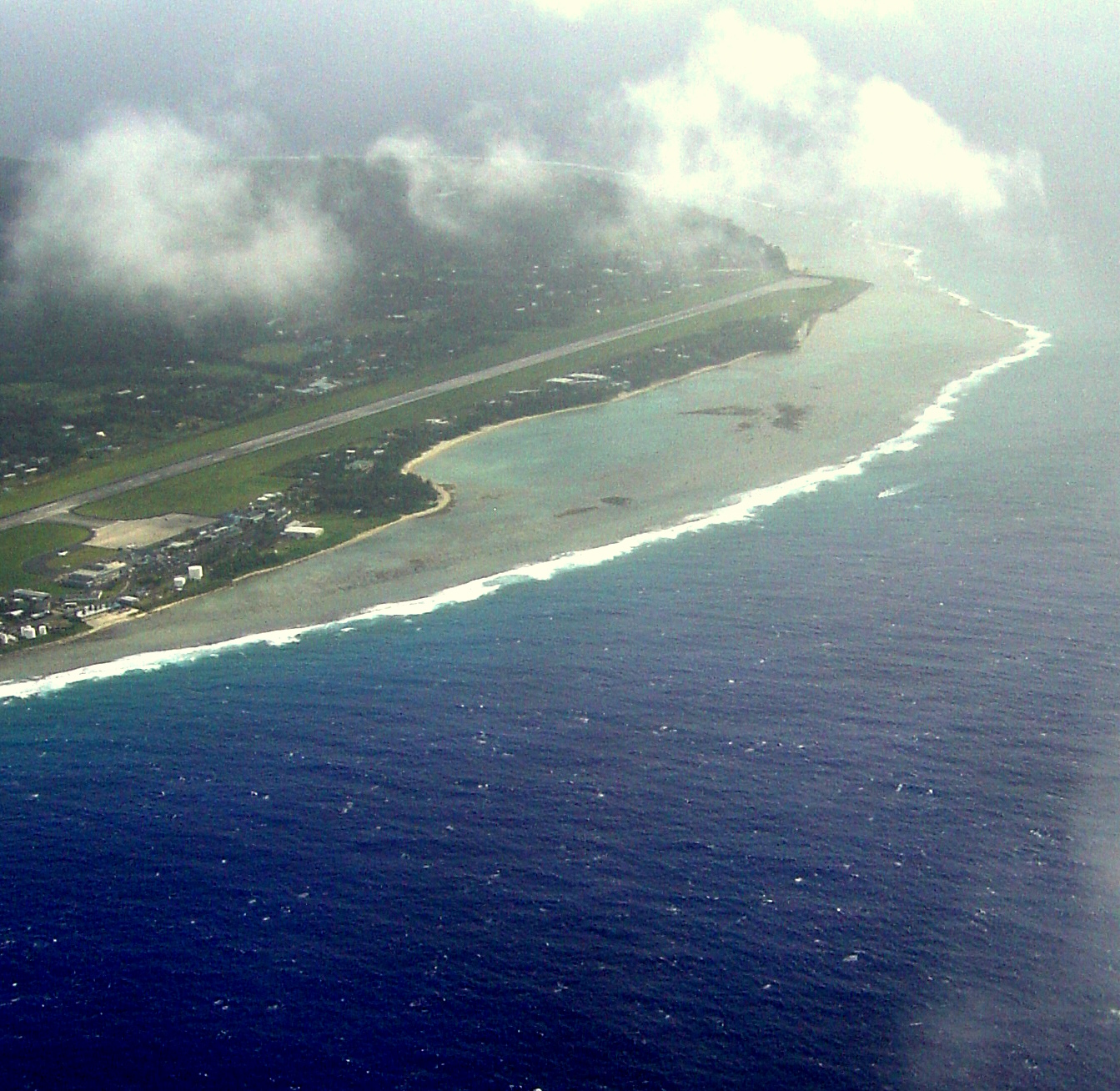
- The airport viewed from the air
- IATA: RAR; ICAO: NCRG

Summary
- Airport type: Public
- Operator: Airport Authority Cook Islands
- Serves: Rarotonga
- Location: Avarua, Rarotonga, Cook Islands
- Hub for: Air Rarotonga Air New Zealand Jetstar
- Elevation AMSL: 19 ft / 6 m
- Coordinates: 21°12′10″S 159°48′20″W
- Website: www.airport.gov.ck

Map
- Location of the airport in Cook Islands RAR (Oceania)

Runways
Direction	Length		Surface
Direction	m	ft	Surface
08/26	2,328	7,638	Concrete
- Sources: DoD FLIP

Rarotonga International Airport (IATA: RAR, ICAO: NCRG; Cook Islands Māori: Papa Rererangi o Rarotonga) is the Cook Islands' main international gateway, located in the Avarua district on the northern coast of Rarotonga, 3 km (1.9 mi) west of the Avarua downtown area. The airport was built in 1944, then expanded in the early 1970s, and officially opened for jets in January 1974. International flights come direct from Australia, French Polynesia, New Zealand and the United States (Hawaii). Air Rarotonga has its headquarters at the airport.

== History ==
The New Zealand Department of Public Works built an unsealed airstrip at Nikao in 1944, with the first flight landing in November 1945. The New Zealand National Airways Corporation operated fortnightly flights from it to Fiji, Tonga, Samoa and Aitutaki from 1945 to 1952, and Polynesian Airways operated flights to Apia from 1963 to 1966. In 1964 the airstrip was extended from 5,000 to 6,000 feet, and TEAL proposed sealing the runway to allow for jet aircraft. The issue was forced in 1966, when increased regulation of international flights requiring the use of larger aircraft threatened to cut off air travel entirely. Local landowners agreed to expansion, and the New Zealand government agreed to provide funding in exchange for control of airspace rights. Construction began in June 1970, and was completed in 1973. The first jet flight, by an Air New Zealand Douglas DC-8, landed in December 1973. The international airport was officially opened on 28 January 1974. The Cook Islands government took control of landing rights in 1985.

In 2003, the terminal and departure and check-in areas were revamped at a cost of US$650,000. An $8.5 million reconstruction project commenced in 2009 to revamp and expand the existing terminal facilities. The new-look terminal was officially opened on 22 June 2010.

Spectators can get close to aircraft while they are taking off and landing because of the proximity of the runways to nearby roads. In July 2015, three tourists were injured by jet blast after being blown over while watching an Air New Zealand Boeing 777 take off. Consequently, in 2016, the Cook Islands Tourism Corporation warned tourist operators that they should not promote the jet blast area as a tourist attraction.

== Airlines and destinations ==
Airlines	Destinations
Air New Zealand	Auckland; Seasonal: Christchurch
Air Rarotonga	Aitutaki, Atiu, Mangaia, Manihiki, Mauke, Mitiaro, Papeete
Air Tahiti	Papeete
Hawaiian Airlines	Honolulu
Jetstar	Auckland, Brisbane, Sydney

== Gallery ==
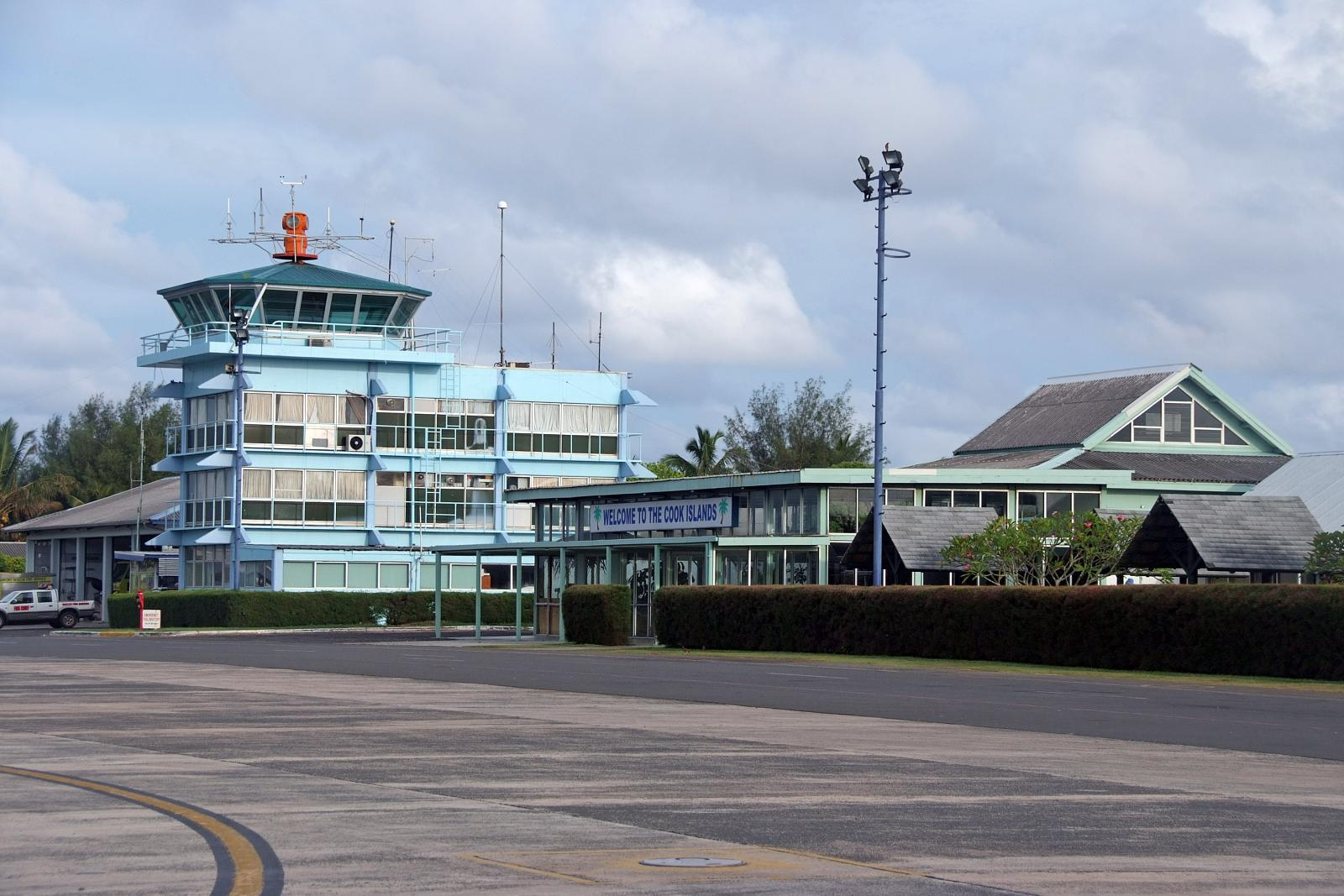
Airport buildings

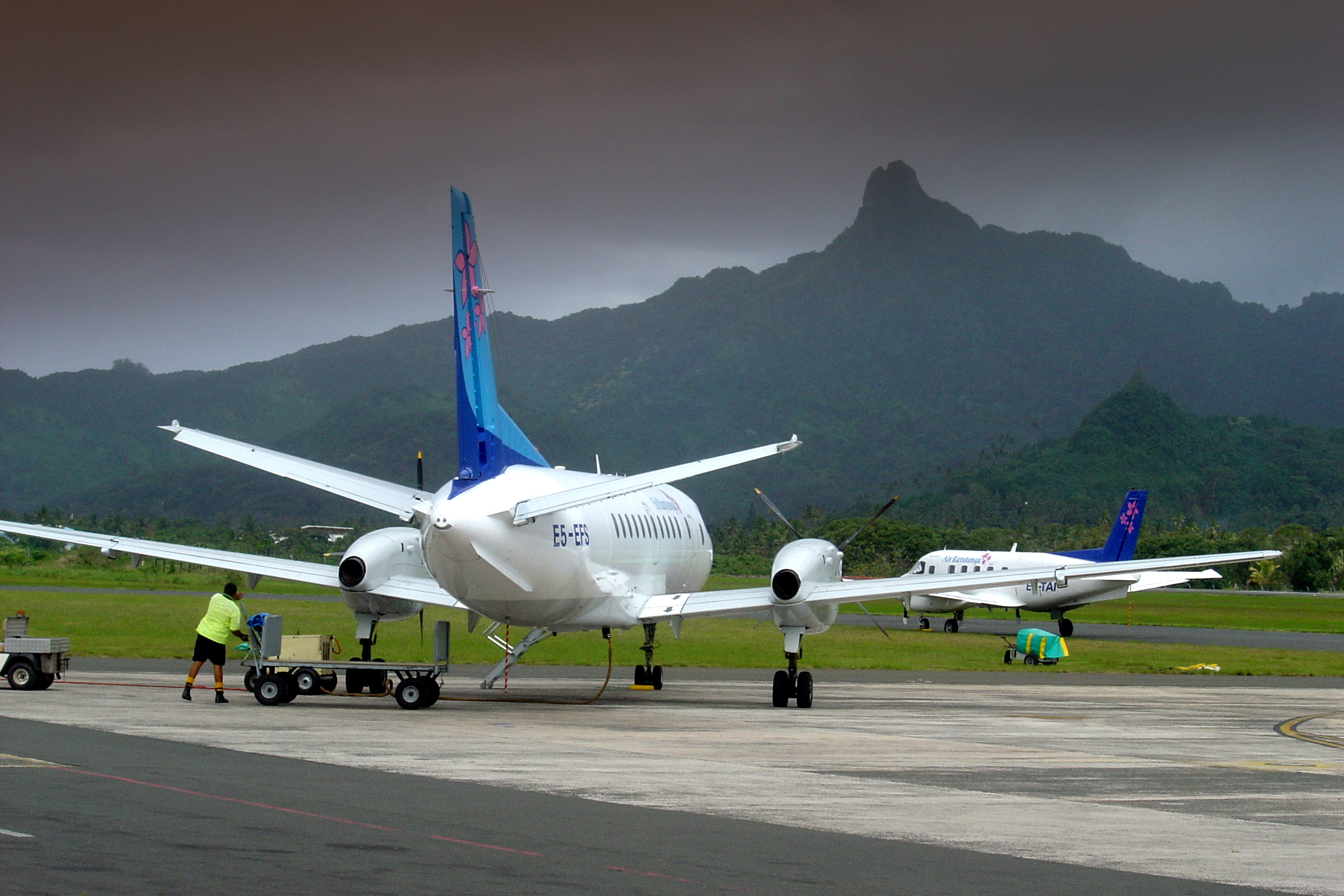
Air Rarotonga Saab 340 and Embraer Bandeirante

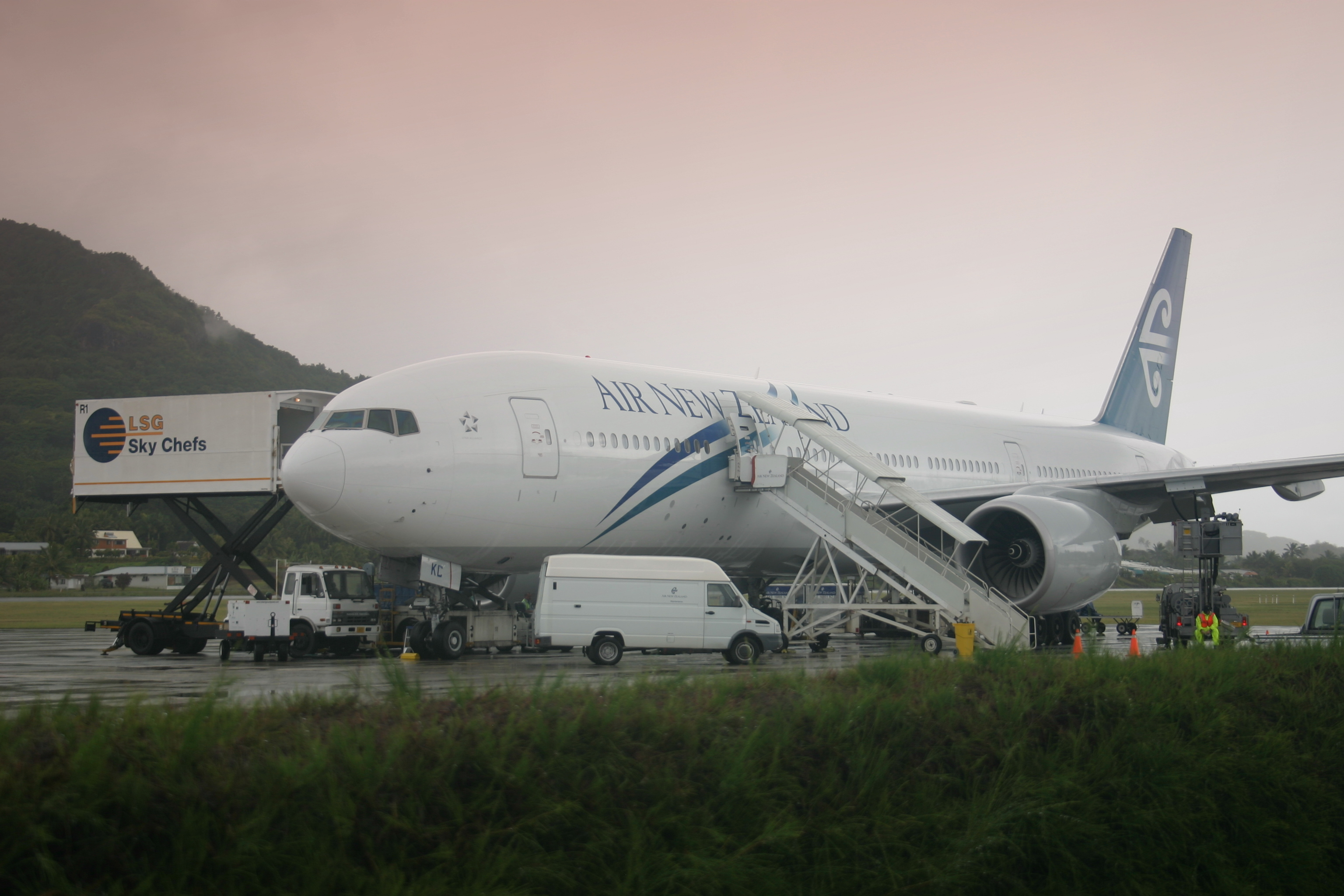
Air New Zealand Boeing 777-200ER at Rarotonga
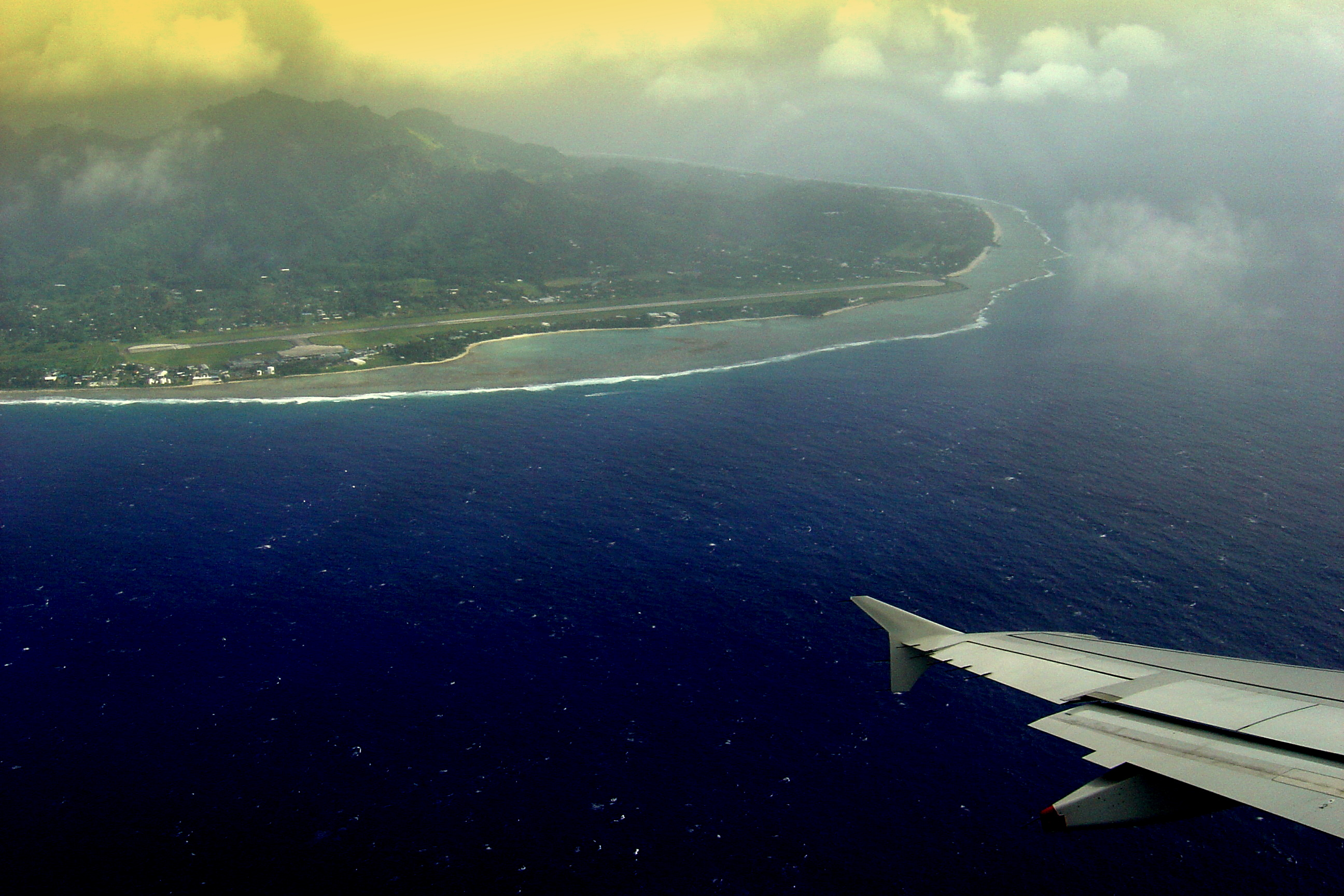
An aerial view of the airport and the island's mountainous interior

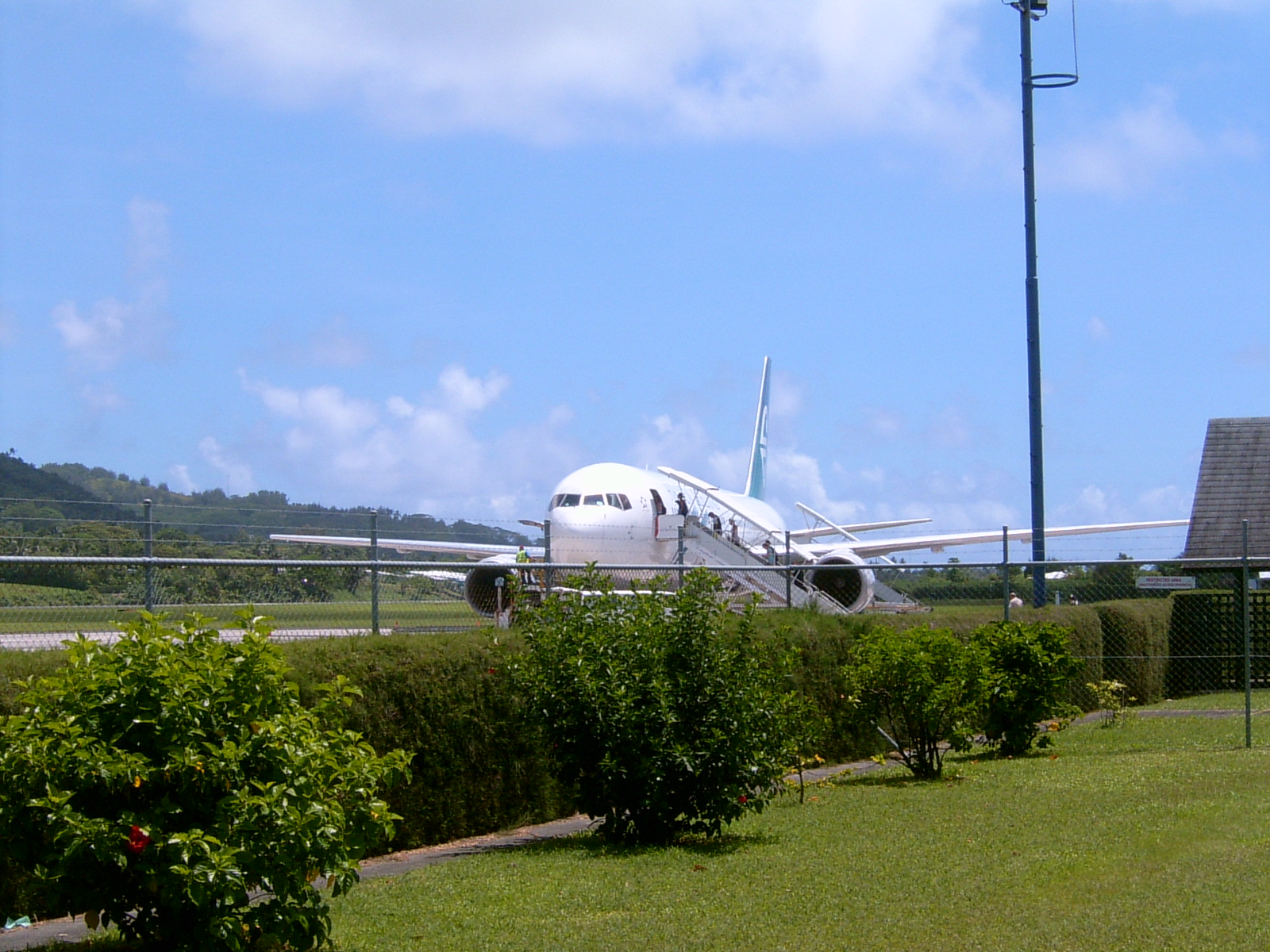
Air New Zealand Boeing 767-300ER airliner at the airport

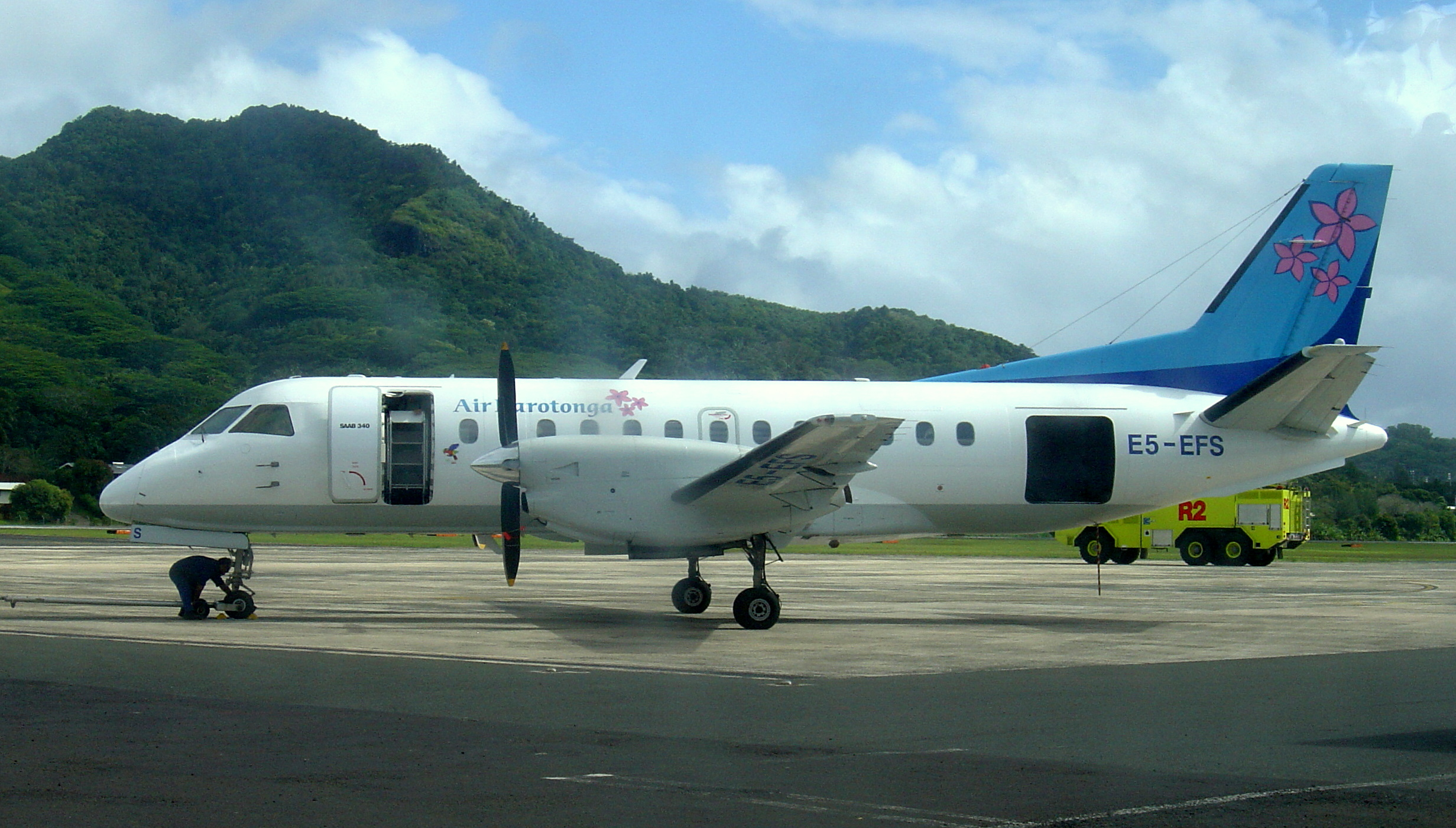
Air Rarotonga Saab 340 inter-island airliner at the airport

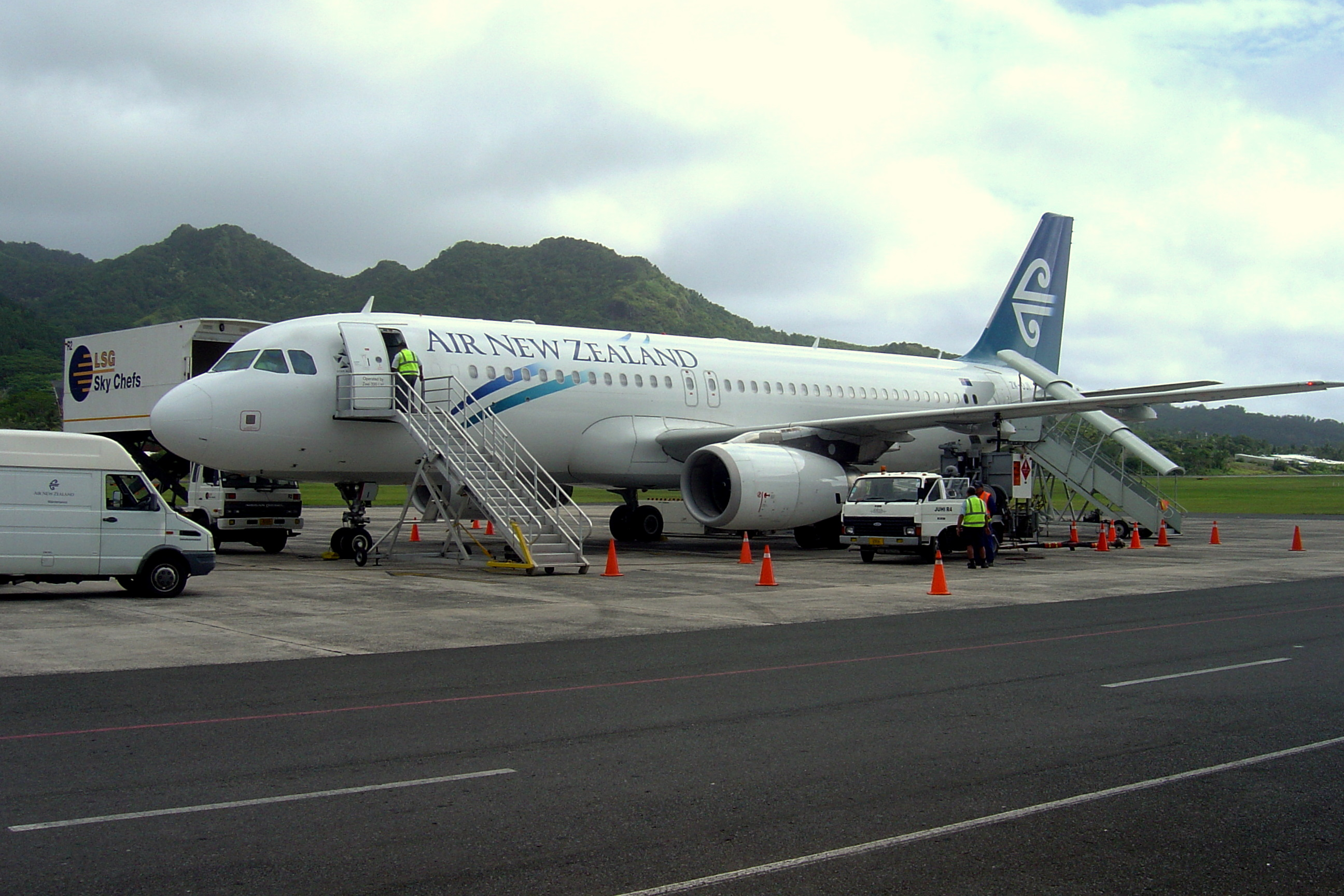
Air New Zealand Airbus A320-200 awaiting passengers at the airport
