= Avarua School =

- Apii Avarua

Location
- 21°12′30.27″S 159°46′16.87″W

Information
- Established: 1916
- Principal: Engia Baxter
- Years offered: 1 to 8
- Gender: Coeducational
- Enrolment: 505

Avarua School or Apii Avarua is a co-educational primary school in Avarua, Rarotonga in the Cook Islands. It is the largest primary school in the Cook Islands, with a roll of 505 in 2019.

The school was founded by the London Missionary Society, which had built a school-house at Avarua by 1831. In 1895 its facilities were loaned to the colonial authorities for use as a government school, but the LMS resumed ownership when the scheme proved a failure. In 1914 the colonial government against promised to establish state schools, with the expectation that existing sites and buildings would be handed over.

The headmaster of Avarua would act as a supervisor, responsible to the New Zealand Education Department, and the school would serve as a training school to train future teachers. The government appointed William Smith as headmaster and the school was formally established in May 1918. From 1926 it was also used a teachers' training college. In October 2016 it celebrated its centenary. In 2013 the school was closed temporarily after hazardous levels of asbestos were discovered.

Construction of a new shaded dome began with a blessing ceremony in April 2018. By April 2019 the canvas had been placed on its steel frames. The school prepared to open the dome on 23 August 2019, when students performed a turou (welcome) for invited guests at the opening of the Punanga o Matakura outdoor dome. The dome has also hosted an exhibition of student art and craft, led by the school's head of art curriculum, Metua Vavia.

The school had 513 students in 2016. By 2022 it had just under 400 and recorded 100 percent attendance on the first day of Term 2. In February 2018 the school inducted 24 prefects. At a later induction, 30 prefects (17 girls and 13 boys) were inducted, and one described the role as a chance to build confidence and leadership skills ahead of Tereora College. The school also teaches early childhood education students alongside Year 8, and its annual Literacy Week includes a Characters Day on which students dress as fictional characters. In September 2026 the school celebrated 110 years, with current and former teachers, parents, students and supporters gathering to mark the milestone.
