= Manihiki Island Airport =

Airport in Manihiki, Cook Islands

- IATA: MHX; ICAO: NCMH

Summary
- Airport type: Public
- Focus city for: Rarotonga
- Elevation AMSL: 6.0 ft (1.8 m)
- Coordinates: 10°22′50″S 160°59′59″W
- Website: Cook Islands Airports
- Interactive map of Manihiki Island Airport

Runways
Direction	Length		Surface
Direction	ft	m	Surface
14-32	4,822	1,470	most likely gravel or coral

Manihiki Island Airport is a public airport on the atoll of Manihiki in the Cook Islands. The airport was built in the early 1980s, but not used for commercial flights until 1991. Originally it had no terminal, with passengers checking in under the overhang of a nearby house and waiting in the open or in the shade of nearby trees. In 2018 construction began on a purpose-built terminal.

== Airlines and destinations ==
Air Rarotonga connects Manihiki Airport to Rarotonga International Airport.
