= Atiu =

Island in the Cook Islands

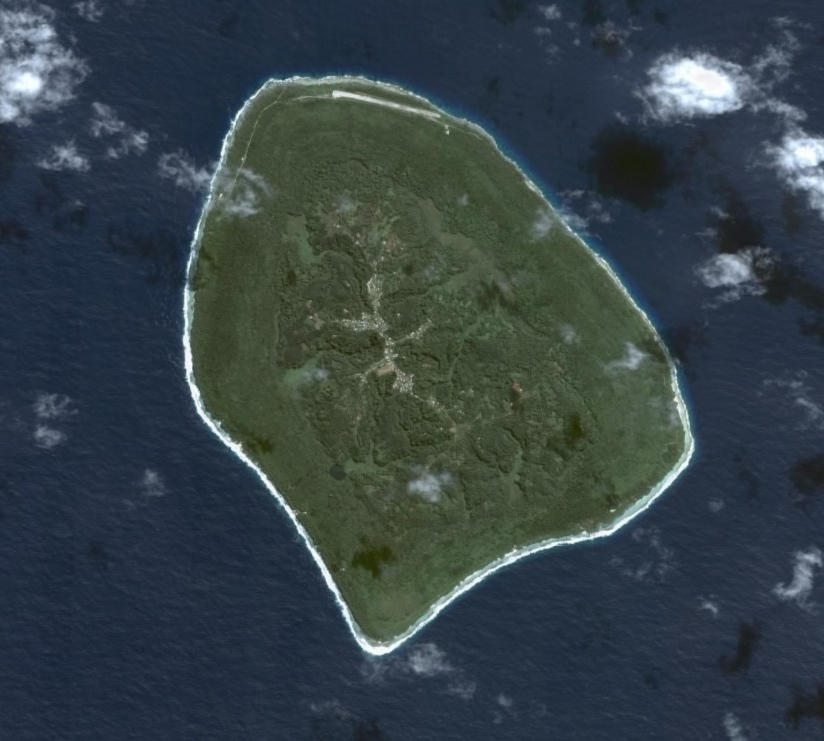
- Satellite Image of Atiu
- Interactive map of Atiu

Geography
- Location: Central-Southern Pacific Ocean
- Coordinates: 19°59′S 158°07′W
- Archipelago: Cook Islands
- Area: 26.9 km^{2} (10.4 sq mi)

Administration
- Cook Islands

Demographics
- Population: 434 (2016)
- Ethnic groups: Polynesian

Location of Atiu in the Pacific Ocean

Ātiu, also known as ʻEnuamanu (meaning land of the birds), is an island of the Cook Islands archipelago, lying in the central-southern Pacific Ocean. Part of the Nga-pu-Toru, it is 214 km (133 mi) northeast of Rarotonga. The population of the 26.9 square kilometres (10.4 sq mi) island has dropped by two-thirds in the last 50 years.

== Geography ==
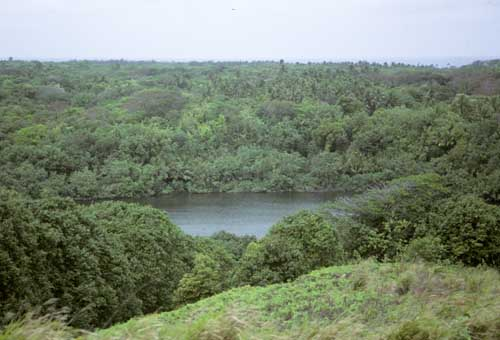
Lake Tiroto, on Atiu Island

Atiu is a raised volcanic island surrounded by a reef from which rise 100-foot-high (30-metre) cliffs of fossilized coral (makatea). The makatea cliff forms a zero-point-five-mile-wide (0.80-kilometre) ring round the island, creating a virtual plateau. Erosion of the inside of the ring has formed a dip of about 30 metres (98 feet) into fertile land, which gradually rises again to a central 70-metre-high (230-foot) flat-topped hill. The low swampy land consists of taro plantations, marshes and a lake, Tiroto. This fertile area also grows bananas, citrus fruits, pawpaws, breadfruit and coconuts.

The island is surrounded by a 300-foot-wide (91-metre) fringing reef. The makatea is honeycombed with caves, some of which have been used for burials.

== History ==
Polynesians are believed to have lived on Atiu since at least 900 or 1000 AD. According to oral tradition, Atiu is named for the first man on the island, who was fathered by Tangaroa. Other traditions identify various settlers, including Te Ariki-Mou-Taua, Mariri, and Nuku-kere-i-manu, as well as a visit by the navigator Ruatapu. The island was unified in c.1760, and subsequently invaded and dominated neighbouring Mauke and Mitiaro.

The first recorded European to arrive at Atiu was Captain Cook. He sighted the island on 31 March 1777, and made tentative contact with some of the people over the next few days. In early 1823 the missionary J.M. Orsmond left two Boraboran teachers on the island. Later that year John Williams of the London Missionary Society arrived and converted the island's leader, Rongomatane Ngaakaara Ariki, to Christianity. This resulted in the island's population being resettled in a single settlement in its centre. Conversion saw Atiu's dominance of its neighbours fade.

In the 1860s Ngamaru Rongotini Ariki, ariki of Atiu, Mauke and Mitiaro, married Makea Takau Ariki, a Rarotongan ariki. As a result, in 1871 Atiu became part of the Kingdom of Rarotonga. In 1888 it became a British protectorate as part of the Cook Islands Federation. In 1901 it was annexed by New Zealand. Post-annexation the island exported oranges, coffee and copra, but exports were disrupted by poor shipping, and collapsed in the 1950s. The citrus industry was revived in the 1960s, but declined again in the 1970s. Lack of economic opportunity had already begun to drive emigration to Rarotonga in the 1950s, and the economic crisis of 1995 and 1996 and subsequent public sector reforms has led to the island's depopulation.

== Demographics ==
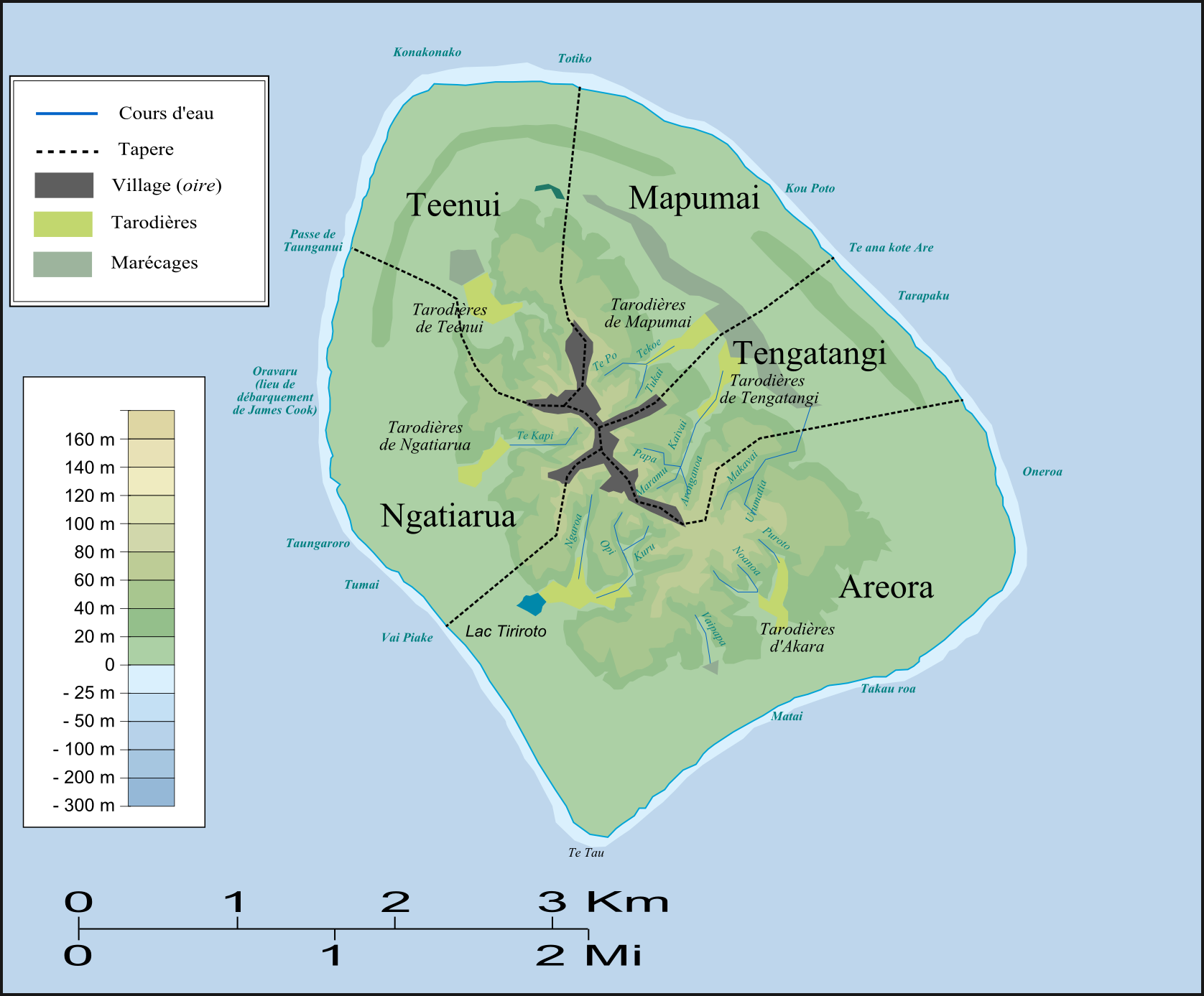
Map of Atiu

Most human settlements are concentrated on the central hill. On 12 March 2003, the population of Atiu was 571, in five villages radiating out from the island's centre, giving the appearance of a human figure. The villages have essentially grown together into one since 1823. They represent the tapere subdivisions prior to European contact. With their traditional names, the villages are:

- Teenui Village (Te-Kuru-Kava-Nui)
- Mapumai Village (Mapumai-Nui-O-Ruavari)
- Ngatiarua Village (Mokoero-Nui-O-Tautipa)
- Areora Village (Areora-Nui-Te-Are-O-Tangaroa)
- Tengatangi Village (Taturoa-I-Te-Puta-Marama)

Each of the five villages in Atiu has a meeting house for their community. In these houses they conduct village meetings and community functions like welcoming and feeding visitors, or selling of products. Educational courses are conducted in these houses and when a group from overseas visit they are often allowed to stay in the meeting house.

Historical population
Year	Pop.	±%
1906	918	—
1916	759	−17.3%
1926	933	+22.9%
1936	1,086	+16.4%
1951	1,270	+16.9%
1961	1,266	−0.3%
1966	1,327	+4.8%
1976	1,312	−1.1%
1986	957	−27.1%
1996	956	−0.1%
2001	623	−34.8%
2006	570	−8.5%
2011	480	−15.8%
2016	434	−9.6%

Administratively, the small uninhabited island of Takutea, now a bird sanctuary, is considered part of Atiu.

== Culture ==
The Atiuans call themselves Toke-enua no Enuamanu ("worms of Enuamanu") because they were born on Atiu and hope to be buried there. There was once a custom on Atiu similar to that of New Zealand Māori of burying a newborn child's placenta under a newly planted tree. This is the origin of the Atiuan saying: "We come from the land and go back to the land."

96% of the population identify themselves as Cook Islanders. 49.6% identify themselves as affiliated with the Cook Islands Christian Church, 21.3% as Roman Catholic, and 13.9% as Seventh-day Adventist.

A local custom is the tumunu or bush beer party. Brewing was introduced to the island by whalers, but the consumption of alcohol was banned by the missionaries and remained illegal until the 1980s, leading to a culture of secret brewing in the jungle. Originally organised as a secret society, the tumunu is now marketed as a tourism experience.

== Economy ==
Atiu's economy is heavily government-supported, with 50% of the workforce employed by the public sector. Following the collapse of the citrus industry and subsequent depopulation of the island, facilities are limited to a few shops, a lodge, and one motel. There is some tourism, and Atiu is the second most-visited outer island after Aitutaki. A new plant nursery was opened in 2020.

Atiu is connected to the rest of the Cook Islands by Enua Airport and a wharf at Taunganui Harbour.

Previously powered by diesel generators, since 2018 it has been powered by a solar-battery power station.

=== Coffee ===
Atiu has a long history of growing coffee. Missionaries established it commercially in the early 19th century. By 1865, annual exports of coffee from the Cook Islands amounted to 30,000 pounds. The islands' ariki (high chiefs) controlled the land used for planting and received most of the returns. The commoners often saw little if any reward for their labour. In the late 1890s, Rarotongan coffee production suffered due to a blight that affected the plants. Coffee production declined and had to rely more on crops from the outer islands Atiu, Mauke and Mangaia. World Wars I and II resulted in a further export reduction and eventual standstill.

In the 1950s the co-operative movement in the Cook Islands resulted in the re-establishment of coffee as a cash crop. On Atiu, under the supervision of New Zealand Resident Agent Ron Thorby and the Cook Islands Agriculture Department, new coffee plantations were established. The raw coffee was destined for export to New Zealand where it was processed and marketed.

By 1983, the coffee industry had collapsed. Government stepped back and left the plantations to their landowners. The poor financial return from selling their coffee to a Rarotongan company for processing had prompted the farmers to stop production except for their own private use. The plantations were overgrown with creepers.

Commercial coffee production was revived sometime in 1984, with the founding of Atiu Coffee Factory Ltd. by German economist Juergen Manske-Eimke. In 2012, the Atiu Coffee Factory managed 39 hectares (96 acres) of land and produced 4.5 tonnes of roasted beans. In 2015 the coffee factory closed and was taken over by Atiu Island Coffee.

== Ecology ==
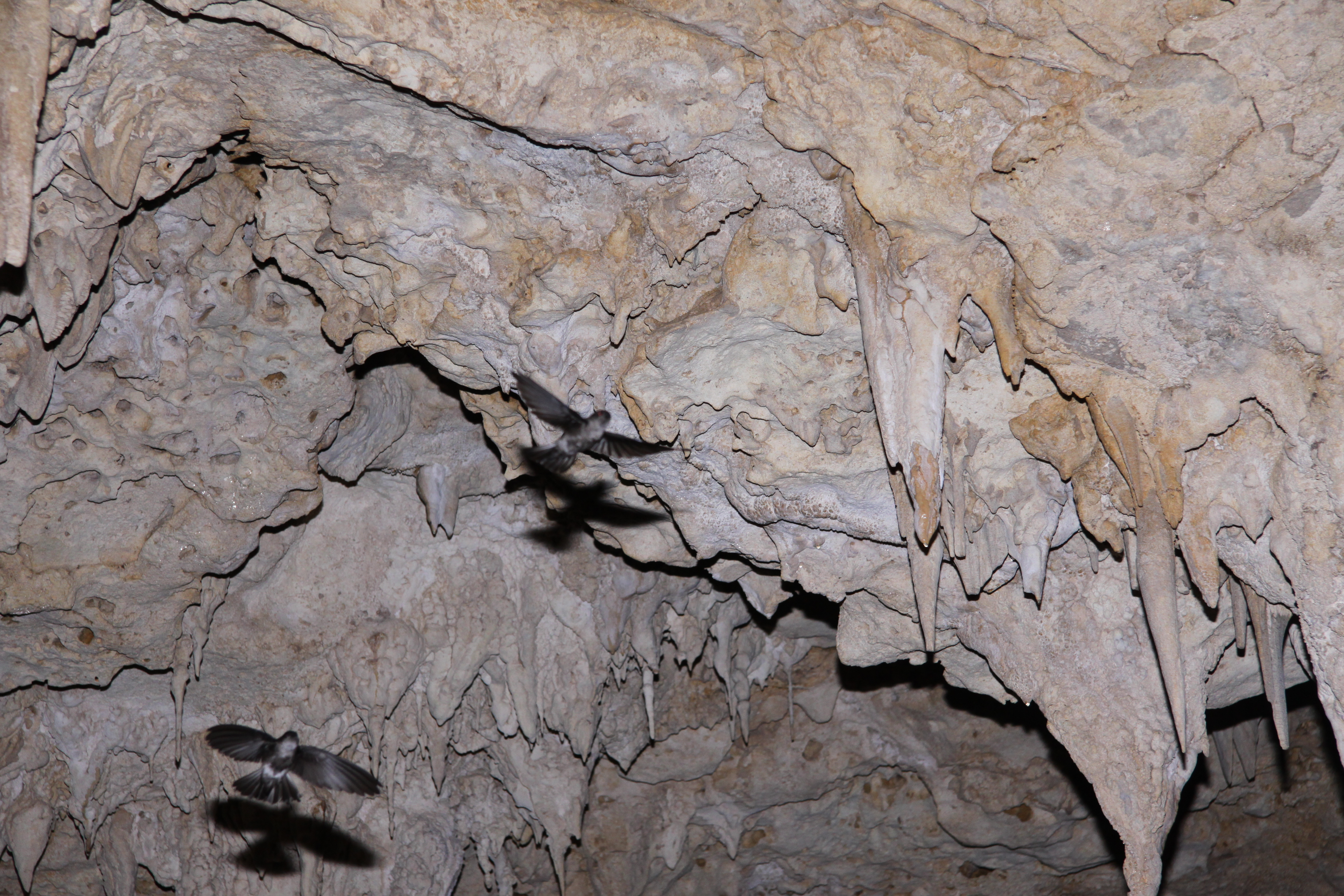
Kopeka (Atiu swiftlet)

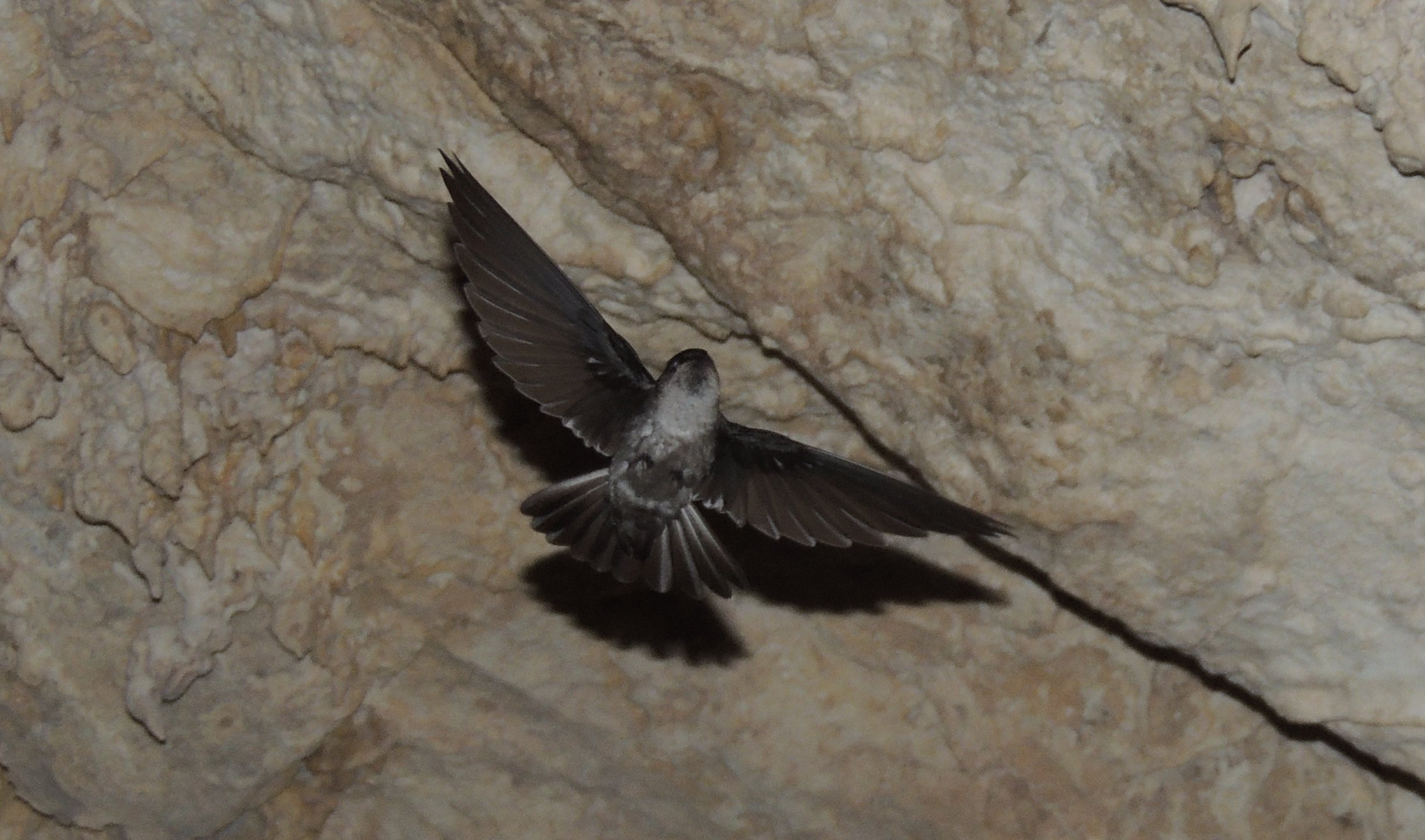
Kopeka (Atiu swiftlet)

=== Flora ===
The flora of Atiu can be divided into five ecological zones. The pa tai (coast) and Rautuitui (upland makatea), are dominated by coconuts and Pandanus tectorius, with patches of Barringtonia asiatica, Elaeocarpus tonganus, and Hernandia moerenhoutiana. The Puna (swampy lowlands) are cultivated for taro, with grasses and forests in the drier parts. The Rautuanue (slopes) and maunga (mountain) are dominated by Platycerium, Casuarina, and crops of pineapple and yams.

In 2017 the Moko‘ero Nui Nature Reserve was established on the western side of the island, protecting 120 hectares of coastal forest.

=== Fauna ===
Endemic birds include the Pacific imperial pigeon, chattering kingfisher, and lilac-crowned fruit dove. The Atiu swiftlet or kopeka (Aerodramus sawtelli), a bird which uses echo-location, is found only on Atiu and nests inside Anatakitaki Cave. Subfossil remains show that the Polynesian ground dove, Polynesian imperial pigeon, and Kuhl's lorikeet (Rimatara lorikeet, Vini kuhlii) were all at one stage extant on Atiu before being extirpated.

Because the island is free of black rats, it was chosen as a site for reintroduction of the Rarotonga monarch in 2001, and Kuhl's lorikeet in 2007. The latter has since become well-established, with a population of over 400 individuals.

The common myna was introduced in 1915 in an effort to control the Coconut Stick-insect and has since become a major pest. In 2009 an eradication campaign was launched, involving trapping, poisoning and shooting. The bird was eradicated from the island in 2014, leading to an outbreak of stick insects in 2016.

The island has been designated an Important Bird Area (IBA) by BirdLife International.

== See also ==
- Mapumai Swamp
