= Tauhunu =

Island and main village of Manihiki, Cook Islands

Coordinates: 10°24′S 161°00′W

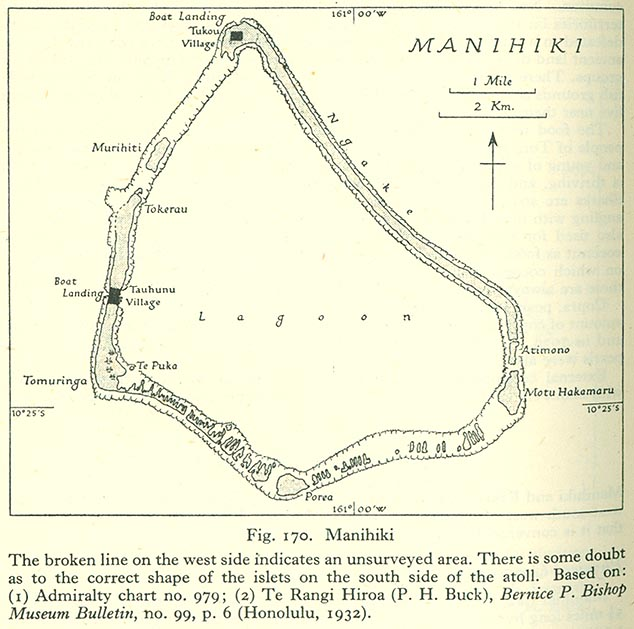
Map of Manihiki Atoll

Tauhunu is both the main village on Manihiki atoll in the Cook Islands and the islet on which it is located. The village is the seat of the Manihiki Island Council. Tauhunu Islet is on the western rim of the atoll.

Tauhunu is a village of native Manihikians (People of Manihiki and the seat of the Manihiki council).
