= 14th Cook Islands Parliament =

The 14th Cook Islands Parliament was a term of the Parliament of the Cook Islands. Its composition was determined by the 2006 elections, held on September 27, 2006. It was dissolved for the 2010 election on 24 September 2010.

Due to an electoral petition declaring the election of Robert Wigmore invalid, the 14th Parliament initially consisted of only 23 members. A by-election was held for the vacant Titikaveka seat on 7 February 2007, and Wigmore was re-elected.

Due to a large number of electoral petitions and the need for a by-election to resolve the tied seat of Akaoa, the Parliament did not meet for the first time until December 2006.

Of the 24 Members of Parliament, three were women. The Speaker of the 14th Parliament was Mapu Taia.

== Members ==
=== Initial MPs ===
Name	Party	Electorate	Term
Teina Bishop	CIP	Arutanga/Nikaupara/Reureu	Third
Cassey Eggelton	DP	Matavera	First
Norman George	CIP	Teenui-Mapumai	Sixth
Nandi Glassie	CIP	Tengatangi/Areora/Ngatiarua	First
William (Smiley) Heather	DP	Ruaau	First
Teariki Heather	CIP	Akaoa	Second
Kete Ioane	DP	Vaipae/Tautu	Third
Terepai Maoate	DP	Ngatangiia	Seventh
Terepai Maoate Jnr	DP	Amuri/Ureia	Second
Tom Marsters	CIP	Murienua	Fifth
Jim Marurai	DP	Ivirua	Fourth
Ngamau Munokoa	DP	Nikao/Panama	Fourth
Albert (Peto) Nicholas	CIP	Avatiu/Ruatonga	Fourth
Mii Parima	CIP	Tamarua	Fourth
Vai Peua	Independent	Pukapuka/Nassau	First
Winton Pickering	DP	Oneroa	Second
Apii Piho	DP	Manihiki	First
Wilkie Rasmussen	DP	Penrhyn	Third
Piho Rua	Independent	Rakahanga	Second
Mapu Taia	DP	Mauke	Third
John Tangi	DP	Tupapa/Maraerenga	First
Ngai Tupa	DP	Takuvaine/Tutakimoa	First
Tangata Vavia	DP	Mitiaro	Fourth

=== New members ===
Name	Party	Electorate	Term
Robert Wigmore	DP	Titikaveka	Second
Pukeiti Pukeiti	CIP	Tamarua	First

=== Summary of changes ===
- Robert Wigmore's election in the seat of Titikaveka was declared invalid by an electoral petition. He was re-elected in a by-election on 7 February 2007.
- Mii Parima died on December 6, 2008. He was replaced by Pukeiti Pukeiti following the 2009 Tamarua by-election.
- Wilkie Rasmussen was expelled from the Cook Islands Democratic Party on 25 August 2009.
- Jim Marurai was expelled from the Democratic party on 23 December 2009.
- Robert Wigmore, Cassey Eggelton, William (Smiley) Heather and Apii Piho were expelled from the Democratic Party on 8 April 2010.
