= 13th Cook Islands Parliament =

The 13th Cook Islands Parliament was a term of the Parliament of the Cook Islands. Its composition was determined by the 2004 election, held on 7 September 2004.

Due to a large number of electoral petitions, Parliament did not meet until mid-December 2006.

The Speaker of the 13th Parliament was Norman George.

== Members ==
=== Initial MPs ===
Name	Party	Electorate	Term
Teina Bishop	CIP	Arutanga/Nikaupara/Reureu	Second
Tupou Faireka	CIP	Tupapa/Maraerenga	Fourth
Teariki Heather	CIP	Akaoa	First
Geoffrey Henry	CIP	Takuvaine/Tutakimoa	Seventh
Kete Ioane	DP	Vaipae/Tautu	Second
Terepai Maoate	DP	Ngatangiia	Sixth
Terepai Maoate Jnr	DP	Amuri/Ureia	First
Tom Marsters	CIP	Murienua	Fourth
Jim Marurai	DP	Ivirua	Third
Tiki Matapo	CIP	Titikaveka	First
Ngamau Munokoa	DP	Nikao/Panama	Third
Albert (Peto) Nicholas	CIP	Avatiu/Ruatonga	Third
Peri Vaevae Pare	DP	Matavera	Second
Mii Parima	CIP	Tamarua	Third
Winton Pickering	DP	Oneroa	First
Henry Puna	CIP	Manihiki	First
Wilkie Rasmussen	DP	Penrhyn	Second
Piho Rua	Independent	Rakahanga	First
Upokomaki Simpson	DP	Teenui-Mapumai	Third
Mapu Taia	DP	Mauke	Second
Eugene Tatuava	DP	Tengatangi/Areora/Ngatiarua	First
Tangata Vavia	DP	Mitiaro	Third
Vaine Iriano Wichman	CIP	Ruaau	First
Tiaki Wuatai	DP	Pukapuka/Nassau	Second
