= List of political parties in the Cook Islands =

This article lists political parties in the Cook Islands. There are two dominant political parties, which means that the Cook Islands have a two-party system. It is extremely difficult for candidates to achieve electoral success under the banner of any other party.

== Active parties ==
=== Parliamentary parties ===
There are two parliamentary parties in the 19th Cook Islands Parliament. The order of this list corresponds to the number of MPs they currently have.

Logo	Name	Abbr.	Est.	Leader	Ideology	MPs	Political position
	Cook Islands Party	CIP	1965	Mark Brown	Cook Islands Māori nationalism	13 / 24	Centre to Centre-right
	Cook Islands United Party	CIUP	2018	Teariki Heather		4 / 24	

=== Extraparliamentary parties ===
An accurate list of active extraparliamentary parties can be difficult to determine. Any person may announce a political party, but these parties may or may not gain followers, receive any media coverage or go on to contest an election. It can also be difficult to determine when parties have ceased operating or moved away from politics.

The list below lists active and notable parties that have unsuccessfully contested at least one of the last two general elections.

Logo	Name	Abbr.	Est.	Leader	Ideology	Political position
	Democratic Party	DP	1971	Tina Pupuke-Browne	Social liberalism	Centre to Centre-left
	One Cook Islands Movement	OCI	2014	George Turia		
	Progressive Party of the Cook Islands	PPCI	2019	Te Tuhi Kelly		

== Historical parties ==
- Alliance Party (1992–2002)
- Cook Islands First Party (2004–2006)
- Cook Islands Labor Party (1965)
- Cook Islands National Party (2003–2004)
- United Political Party (1965)
- Democratic Tumu Party (1989–1993)
- New Alliance Party (1997–2002)
- Party Tumu (2010)
- Te Kura O Te ‘Au People's Movement (2010)
- Tumu Enua (2004)
- United Cook Islanders (UCI) (1968–1970?)

== See also ==
- List of ruling political parties by country
