= 2004 Cook Islands general election =

- 7 September 2004
- 24 seats in the Parliament; 13 seats needed for a majority
Party	Leader	Vote %	Seats	+/–
Democratic	Terepai Maoate	47.36	14	+4
Cook Islands	Geoffrey Henry	43.79	9	−2
Independents	Piho Rua	6.47	1	+1
This lists parties that won seats. See the complete results below.
Prime Minister before	Prime Minister after
Robert Woonton; Democratic	Robert Woonton; Democratic

General elections were held in the Cook Islands on 7 September 2004. Initial results showed the Democratic Party winning by a wide margin, but close results led to 11 electoral petitions being filed, delaying the date Parliament could sit until mid-December. In the interim, Prime Minister Robert Woonton announced that he was forming a coalition government with the rival Cook Islands Party. This led to a split within the Democrats, with Woonton and four other MPs leaving to form the Demo Tumu Party. With 14 MPs, the coalition had a comfortable majority in Parliament.

The results of the electoral petitions saw the seat of Titikaveka change hands while Woonton's seat was a dead tie. Woonton subsequently resigned in order to fight a by-election, causing his government to be dissolved. He was succeeded by his deputy, Jim Marurai.

== Results ==
Party	Votes	%	Seats	+/–
Democratic Alliance Party	3,944	47.36	14	+4
Cook Islands Party	3,647	43.79	9	–2
Tumu Enua	198	2.38	0	New
Independents	539	6.47	1	+1
Total	8,328	100.00	24	–1
Source: Cook Islands News, IFES

=== By electorate ===
Akaoa
Party	Candidate	Votes	%	±%
Cook Islands	Teariki Heather	188	54.3	
Democratic	Teremoana Tapi Taio	158	45.7	
Turnout		346	75.5	

Amuri-Ureia
Party	Candidate	Votes	%	±%
Democratic	Terepai Maoate Jnr	185	50.7	
Cook Islands	Teokotai Herman	175	47.9	
Independent	Kiria Kiria	5	1.4	
Turnout		365	97.0	

Arutanga-Reureu-Nikaupara
Party	Candidate	Votes	%	±%
Cook Islands	Teina Bishop	178	57.6	
Democratic	Ronald Henry	131	42.4	
Turnout		309	92.8	

Avatiu-Ruatonga-Palmerston
Party	Candidate	Votes	%	±%
Cook Islands	Albert (Peto) Nicholas	315	52.7	
Democratic	Poko Keu	283	47.3	
Turnout		598	80.9	

Ivirua
Party	Candidate	Votes	%	±%
Democratic	Jim Marurai	Unopposed		

Manihiki
Party	Candidate	Votes	%	±%
Democratic	Robert Woonton	142	50.7	
Cook Islands	Henry Puna	138	49.3	
Turnout		280	100.0	

Matavera
Party	Candidate	Votes	%	±%
Democratic	Peri Vaevae Peri	221	49.3	
Cook Islands	Kiriau Turepu	200	44.6	
Independent	Mereana Taikoko	27	6.0	
Turnout		448	88.9	

Mauke
Party	Candidate	Votes	%	±%
Democratic	Mapu Taia	124	61.4	
Cook Islands	George Cowan	87	43.1	
TE	Taratoa Rouru Metuariki	17	8.4	
Turnout		202	83.1	

Mitiaro
Party	Candidate	Votes	%	±%
Democratic	Tangata Vavia	65	52.4	
Cook Islands	Travel Tou Ariki	59	47.6	
Turnout		124	96.9	

Murienua
Party	Candidate	Votes	%	±%
Cook Islands	Tom Marsters	180	47.0	
Democratic	William Pera	99	25.8	
Independent	Brett Porter	86	22.5	
TE	Rouru Metuariki	18	4.7	
Turnout		383	74.8	

Ngatangiia
Party	Candidate	Votes	%	±%
Democratic	Terepai Maoate	269	57.2	
Cook Islands	Metuatini Tangaroa	170	36.2	
Independent	Maru Ben	31	6.6	
Turnout		470	87.5	

Nikao-Panama
Party	Candidate	Votes	%	±%
Democratic	Ngamau Munokoa	442	71.9	
Cook Islands	Mamapo Manuela	173	28.1	
Turnout		615	74.5	

Oneroa
Party	Candidate	Votes	%	±%
Democratic	Winton Pickering	132	55.9	
TE	Taata Tangatakino	96	40.7	
Cook Islands	Papamama Pokino	8	3.4	
Turnout		236	99.6	

Penrhyn
Party	Candidate	Votes	%	±%
Cook Islands	Wilkie Rasmussen	103	52.3	
Democratic	Tepure Tapaitau	94	47.7	
Turnout		197	102.1	

Pukapuka-Nassau
Party	Candidate	Votes	%	±%
Democratic	Tiaki Wuatai	181	51.4	
Cook Islands	Tiera Mataora	171	48.6	
Turnout		352	98.1	

Rakahanga
Party	Candidate	Votes	%	±%
Independent	Piho Rua	42	56.8	
Democratic	Pupuke Robati	32	43.2	
Turnout		74	89.2	

Ruaau
Party	Candidate	Votes	%	±%
Cook Islands	Vaine Iriano Wichman	315	55.1	
Democratic	Geoffrey Heather	257	44.9	
Turnout		572	87.5	

Takuvaine-Tutakimoa
Party	Candidate	Votes	%	±%
Cook Islands	Geoffrey Henry	243	46.1	
Democratic	Ngai Tupa	202	38.3	
Independent	Jessie Sword	82	15.6	
Turnout		527	83.4	

Tamarua
Party	Candidate	Votes	%	±%
Cook Islands	Mii Parima	43	68.3	
Democratic	Andy Matapo	20	31.7	
Turnout		63	82.9	

Teenui-Mapumai
Party	Candidate	Votes	%	±%
Democratic	Upokomaki Simpson	71	54.6	
Cook Islands	Tangaina Tanga	59	45.4	
Turnout		130	92.2	

Tengatangi-Areora-Ngatiarua
Party	Candidate	Votes	%	±%
Democratic	Eugene Tatuava	73	35.6	
TE	Norman George	67	32.7	
Cook Islands	Nooroa Tou	65	31.7	
Turnout		205	97.6	

Titikaveka
Party	Candidate	Votes	%	±%
Democratic	Robert Wigmore	270	42.5	
Cook Islands	Tiki Matapo	264	41.6	
Independent	Tere Carr	101	15.9	
Turnout		635	86.9	

Tupapa-Maraerenga
Party	Candidate	Votes	%	±%
Cook Islands	Tupou Faireka	353	43.7	
Democratic	John Tangi	290	35.9	
Independent	Elizabeth Ponga	165	20.4	
Turnout		808	87.8	

Vaipae-Tautu
Party	Candidate	Votes	%	±%
Democratic	Kete Ioane	203	55.9	
Cook Islands	Tiraa Arere	160	44.1	
Turnout		363	82.1	
