= Peri Vaevae Pare =

Cook Islands politician (died 2020)

Minister of Police
- In office 14 December 2004 – 29 September 2005
- Prime Minister: Jim Marurai
- Succeeded by: Jim Marurai

Minister of Health
- In office 15 February 2002 – 6 January 2006
- Prime Minister: Robert Woonton; Jim Marurai
- Preceded by: Terepai Maoate
- Succeeded by: Terepai Maoate
- In office 5 August 2001 – 10 December 2001
- Prime Minister: Terepai Maoate
- Succeeded by: Terepai Maoate

Minister of Internal Affairs
- In office 15 February 2002 – 14 December 2004
- Prime Minister: Robert Woonton

Minister of Social Services
- In office 15 February 2002 – 14 December 2004

Attorney-General
- In office 5 August 2001 – 10 December 2001
- Prime Minister: Terepai Maoate

Member of the Cook Islands Parliament for Matavera
- In office 16 June 1999 – 2 June 2006
- Preceded by: Mataio Mataio Aperau
- Succeeded by: Kiriau Turepu

Personal details
- Died: 27 May 2020 Rarotonga
- Party: Cook Islands Democratic Party; Cook Islands First Party

Peri Vaevae Pare (died 27 May 2020) was a Cook Islands politician and Cabinet Minister. He was stripped of his seat in Parliament after being convicted of corruption in 2005.

== Biography ==
Pare was the brother of musician Noo Pare and would often host musicians visiting Rarotonga. He previously worked as a Chief Laboratory Officer at Rarotonga Hospital.

He was elected to Parliament as a member of the Democratic Alliance Party in the 1999 Cook Islands general election. In August 2001, he was appointed to the Cabinet of Terepai Maoate as Attorney-General and Minister of Health, but was sacked in December. After Robert Woonton replaced Maoate in February 2002 he was appointed Minister of Health, Social Services, and Internal Affairs. Shortly after becoming Health Minister he delayed and then cancelled a proposed xenotransplantation trial being promoted by former Prime Minister Joe Williams. The trial involved injecting pig cells into humans as a means of fighting diabetes and had been moved to the Cook Islands as it could not legally take place in New Zealand.

Pare was re-elected at the 2004 election, and supported Woonton in his efforts to form a coalition with the Cook Islands Party. As a result he was expelled from the Democratic Party, and joined Woonton's newly formed Demo Party Tumu (later known as Cook Islands First). After Woonton's resignation as Prime Minister he was appointed to the Cabinet of Jim Marurai as Minister of Health and Police. In October 2006 he was investigated by police for wrongful use of public funds and surrendered his police portfolio. He was subsequently prosecuted and convicted on three charges of using documents to defraud. In January 2006 while he was awaiting an appeal he was asked to resign from Cabinet. In June 2006 his conviction was upheld and he was sentenced to come up for sentencing if called upon within 12 months. As a result of his conviction he lost his seat, precipitating the 2006 Matavera by-election, and ultimately, the 2006 Cook Islands general election.

Pare died in quarantine in May 2020, while returning to the Cook Islands during the COVID-19 pandemic.
