= 2005 Manihiki by-election =

Election in the Cook Islands

- 8 February 2005

Constituency of Manihiki
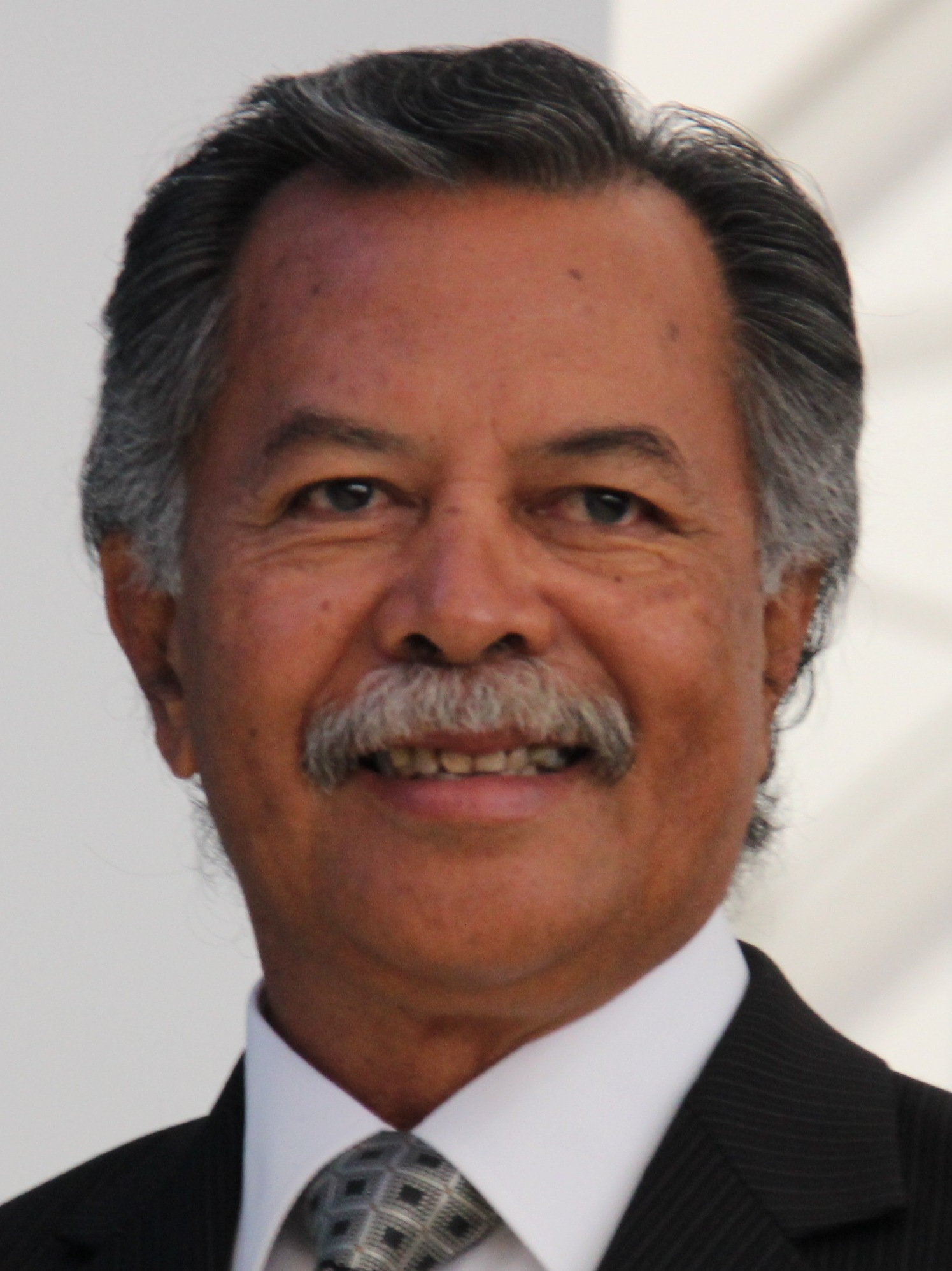
	First party	Second party
		DP
Candidate	Henry Puna	Apii Piho
Party	Cook Islands	Democratic
Popular vote	120	100
Percentage	54.55%	45.45%
MP before election
Robert Woonton
Democratic
Elected MP
Henry Puna
Cook Islands

The 2005 Manihiki by-election was a by-election in the Cook Islands electorate of Manihiki. It was held on 8 February 2005, shortly after the 2004 general election, and was precipitated by an electoral petition finding the result in the seat to be a dead tie. Both parties to the petition, Prime Minister Robert Woonton and Cook Islands Party leader Henry Puna had agreed that in the event of a draw the question should be decided by the voters, and so Woonton resigned. As a result, Jim Marurai became prime minister.

Woonton subsequently decided not to contest the election for personal reasons. The election was won by Henry Puna.

== Results ==
Manihiki by-election, 2005
Party	Candidate	Votes	%	±%
Cook Islands	Henry Puna	120	54.5%	
Democratic	Apii Piho	100	45.5%	
Turnout		220		
