= Cook Islands First Party =

The Cook Islands First Party (originally known as the Demo Tumu Party, translatable as "Original/True Democratic Party") was a political party in the Cook Islands. The party was originally a faction within the Cook Islands Democratic Party which supported Prime Minister Robert Woonton over Terepai Maoate. The 2004 elections saw the Democrats win a clear majority, but it was not clear whether Woonton would have the numbers within the party to remain Prime Minister. Woonton's announcement on 15 November 2004 that he was forming a coalition with the rival Cook Islands Party with himself as Prime Minister. This touched off a bitter struggle within the Democrats, which ultimately saw Woonton and his Health Minister Peri Vaevae Pare expelled from the party. Woonton responded by launching his own party, the Demo Tumu Party, on 1 December 2004.

Initially the party consisted of 4 MPs: Woonton, Pare, then-education minister Jim Marurai and Democratic backbenchers Teenui Mapumai and Poko Simpson. The party maintained its coalition agreement with the Cook Islands Party and the support of independent MP Piho Rua, and Woonton remained Prime Minister. Woonton subsequently resigned his seat in order to fight a by-election, causing his government to be dissolved. The coalition held, with Woonton's deputy Jim Marurai replacing him as Prime Minister as part of a deal which would see CIP leader Geoffrey Henry replace him after two years.

The coalition deal was dissolved in September 2005, and the party, now calling itself "Cook Islands First," formed a new coalition with the Democrats. The parties re-united shortly before the 2006 election, and the party is now defunct.
