= Akaiti Puna =

Cook Islands politician

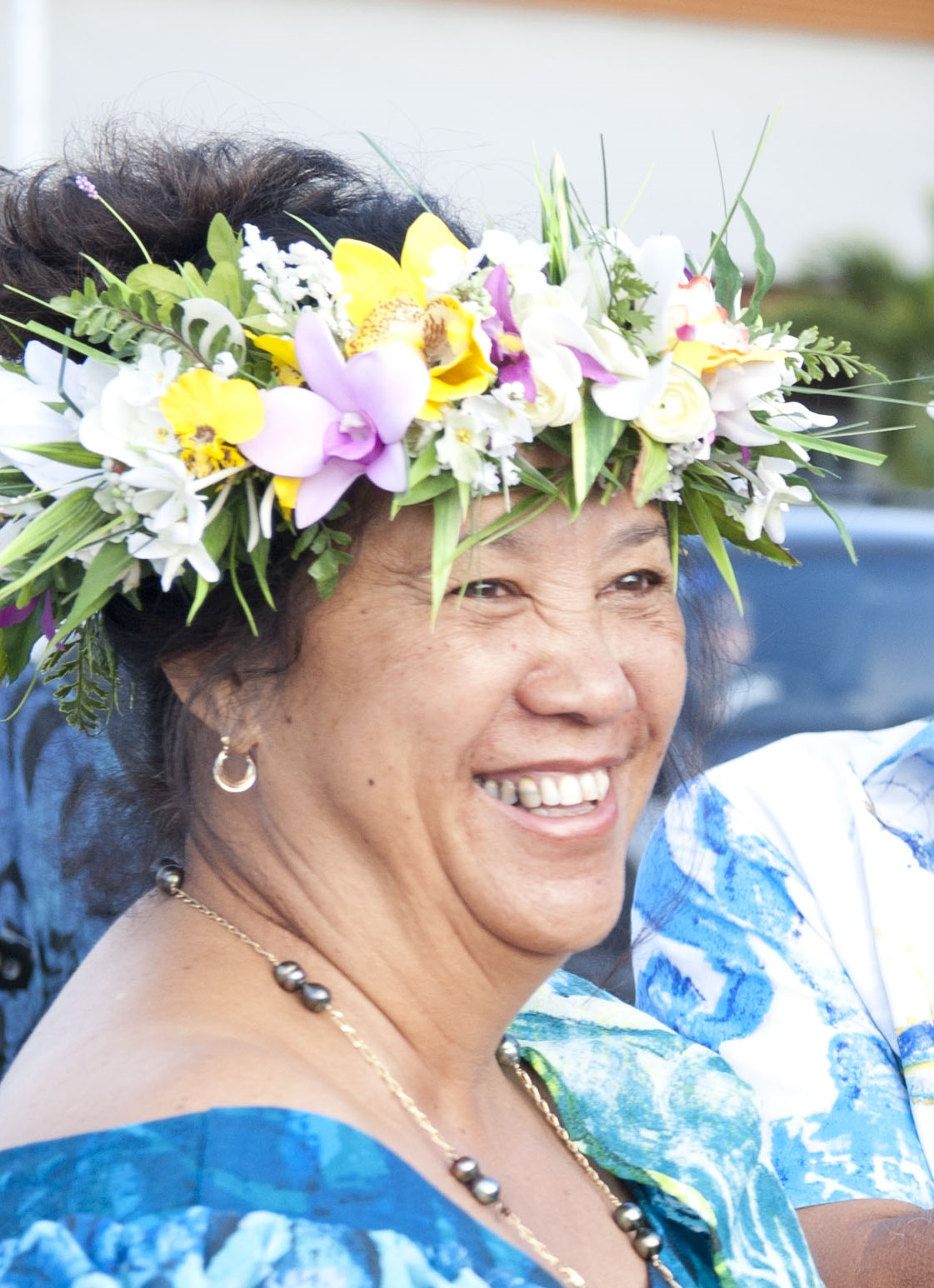
- Akaiti Puna in 2012

Member of the Cook Islands Parliament for Manihiki
- In office 5 May 2021 – 2026
- Preceded by: Henry Puna
- Succeeded by: George Angene

Personal details
- Born: 5 September 1952 (age 74)
- Party: Cook Islands Party

Akaitiiti O Te Rangi Puna (born 5 September 1952) is a Cook Islands politician and member of the Cook Islands Parliament. She is a member of the Cook Islands Party. She is married to the former Cook Islands Prime Minister Henry Puna and the sister of MP Tukaka Ama.

Puna was born on Rarotonga and educated at Tereora College and at Auckland Girls' Grammar School in New Zealand. She began playing netball at school in New Zealand, and continued on her return to the Cook Islands, playing for Ngatangiia. She served as manager for Netball Cook Islands at the 1981 South Pacific Mini Games, and later served on its board. From 1972 she worked for Air New Zealand.

Following her husband's election as prime minister in the 2010 election Puna managed their pearl farm on Manihiki. When he retired in 2021 in order to take up the job of Secretary General of the Pacific Islands Forum she stood in his former seat of Manihiki in the resulting by-election, and was elected. She was elected with 82 votes, beating candidate Munokoa Maraeara of the Democratic Party and Temu Okotai who represented the independents, bringing the Cook Islands Party government majority in the parliament to 13 of the 24 seats. She was sworn in as an MP on 31 May 2021.

She was re-elected at the 2022 Cook Islands general election. In February 2024, Puna was appointed Leader of the House of the Cook Islands Parliament. She was elected after Pukapuka-Nassau MP Tingika Elikana became the Minister of Foreign Affairs and of Marine Resources.

Puna ran for re-election at the 2026 general election, but was defeated by independent candidate George Angene.
