= Rakahanga (electorate) =

Electoral division in the Cook Islands

- Constituency for the Parliament of the Cook Islands
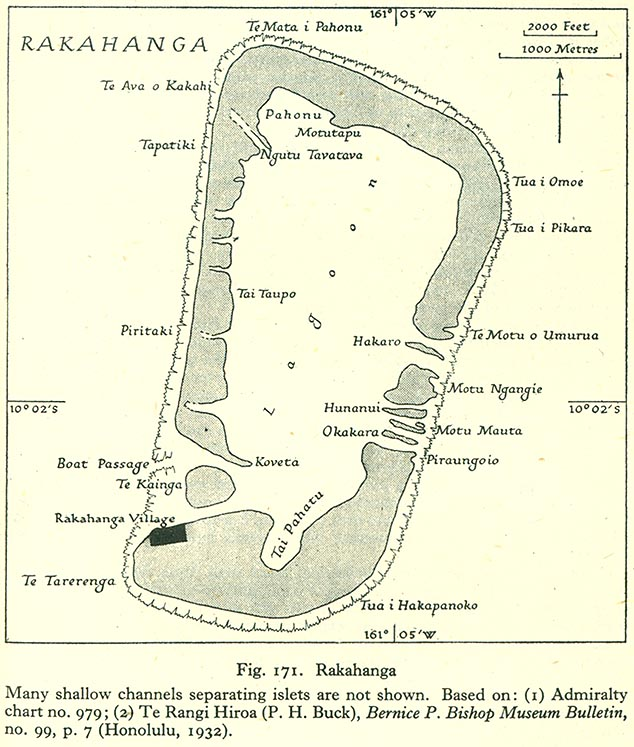
- Region: Outer Islands

Current constituency
- Number of members: 1
- Member: Levi Hitarahera Teinaki

Rakahanga is a Cook Islands electoral division returning one member to the Cook Islands Parliament. Its current representative is Levi Hitarahera Teinaki, who has held the seat since 2026.

The electorate consists of the island of Rakahanga.

== Members of Parliament for Rakahanga ==
Unless otherwise stated, all MPs terms began and ended at general elections.

Name	Party	Elected	Left Office	Reason
Pupuke Robati	Independent	1965, 1968	2004	Joined new party
Pupuke Robati	Democratic Party	1972, 1974, 1978, 1983 (Mar), 1983 (Nov), 1989, 1994, 1999	2004	Defeated
Piho Rua	Independent	2004, 2006	2010	Retired
Taunga Toka	Democratic Party	2010	2014	Defeated
Toka Hagai	Cook Islands Party	2014, 2018	2018	Resigned
Tina Pupuke-Browne	Democratic Party	2018, 2022	2026	Defeated
Levi Hitarahera Teinaki	Cook Islands Party	2026	incumbent	

== Election results ==
=== 2026 election ===
2026 Cook Islands general election: Rakahanga
Party	Candidate	Votes	%	±%
Cook Islands	Levi Hitarahera Teinaki	32	54.2	
Democratic	Tina Pupuke-Browne^{†}	27	45.8	
Turnout		59		
Cook Islands gain from Democratic		Swing		
^{†} incumbent

=== 2010 election ===
Cook Islands general election, 2010: Rakahanga
Party	Candidate	Votes	%	±%
Democratic	Taunga Toka	27	56.3	
Cook Islands	Toka Hagai	21	43.8	
Turnout		48		

=== 2006 election ===
Cook Islands general election, 2006: Rakahanga
Party	Candidate	Votes	%	±%
Independent	Piho Rua	42	60.0	
Democratic	David Alepha Greig	28	40.0	
Turnout		70	94.6	

=== 2004 election ===
Cook Islands general election, 2004: Rakahanga
Party	Candidate	Votes	%	±%
Independent	Piho Rua	42	56.8	
Democratic	Pupuke Robati	32	43.2	
Turnout		74	89.2	
