= Tom Marsters =

Cook Islands politician (b.1945)

Sir Tom Marsters KBE
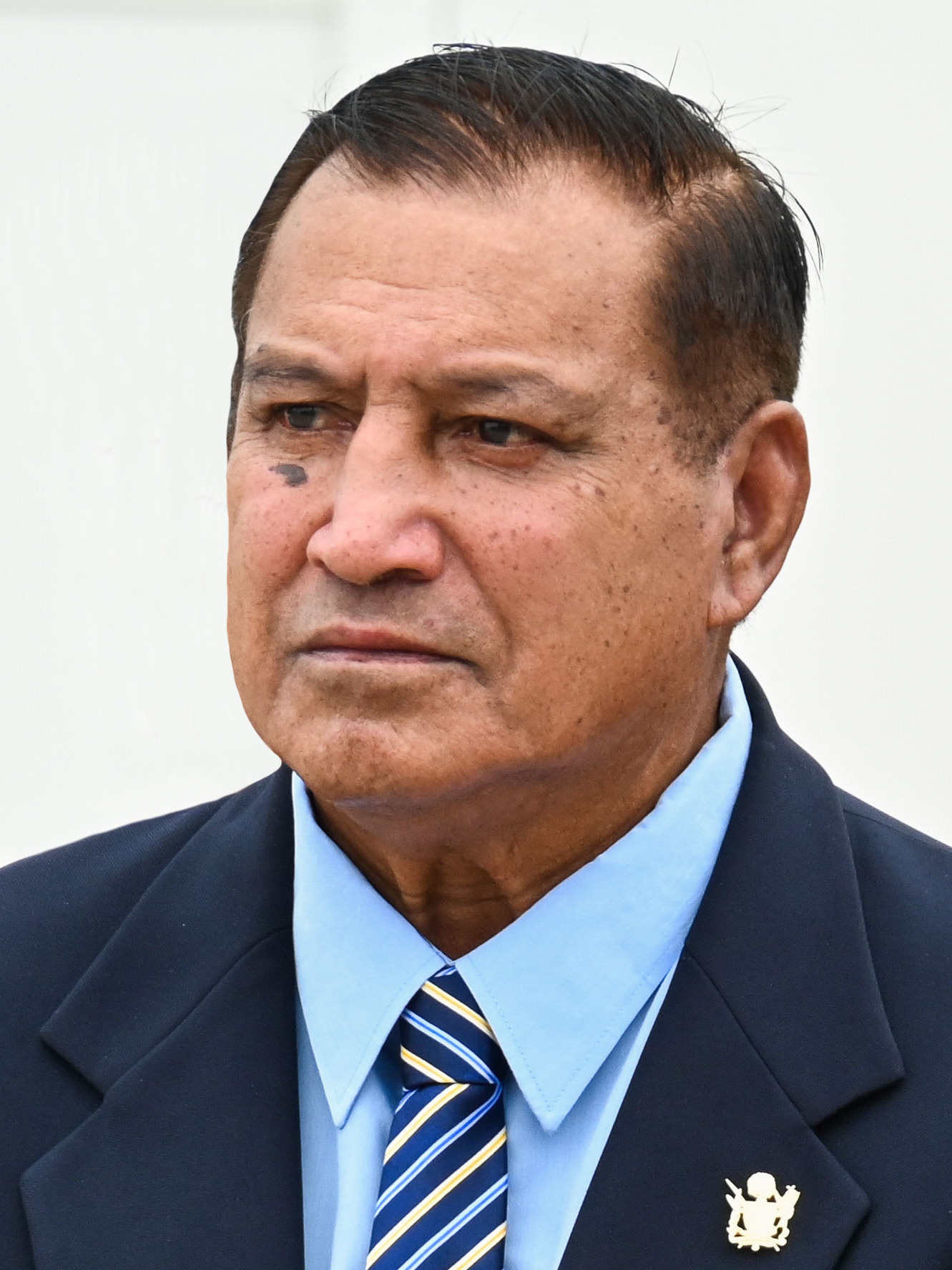
- Marsters in 2025

King's Representative to the Cook Islands
- Incumbent
- Assumed office 27 July 2013
- Monarchs: Elizabeth II; Charles III
- Prime Minister: Henry Puna; Mark Brown
- Preceded by: Sir Frederick Tutu Goodwin

Deputy Prime Minister of the Cook Islands
- In office 10 December 2010 – 10 June 2013
- Prime Minister: Henry Puna
- Preceded by: Robert Wigmore
- Succeeded by: Teariki Heather

Minister of Foreign Affairs
- In office 10 December 2010 – 10 June 2013
- Preceded by: Robert Wigmore
- Succeeded by: Henry Puna
- In office 18 December 2004 – 12 September 2005
- Prime Minister: Jim Marurai
- Preceded by: Robert Woonton
- Succeeded by: Wilkie Rasmussen

Minister of Transport
- In office 10 December 2010 – 10 June 2013
- Preceded by: William (Smiley) Heather
- Succeeded by: Henry Puna

Minister of Works
- In office 15 February 2002 – 30 January 2003
- Prime Minister: Robert Woonton
- Preceded by: Ngamau Munokoa
- Succeeded by: Tangata Vavia

Member of the Cook Islands Parliament for Murienua
- In office 1991 – 25 July 2013
- Succeeded by: Kaota Tuariki

Personal details
- Born: 4 August 1945 (age 80) Palmerston Island, Cook Islands
- Party: Cook Islands Party
- Education: Avele College; Grimsby Institute

Sir Tom John Marsters KBE (born 4 August 1945) is a Cook Islands politician who has been the vice-regal representative in the Cook Islands (Note: Marsters was Queen's Representative during the reign of Elizabeth II. Subsequent to the death of Elizabeth II and accession of King Charles III on 8 September 2022, the office has since been known as "King's Representative".) since 2013. He is a former Deputy Prime Minister of the Cook Islands, Foreign Minister, and Deputy Leader of the Cook Islands Party.

== Personal life ==
Marsters was born on Palmerston Island and educated at Nikao and Avarua Primary Schools before attending Avele College in Samoa and Grimsby Institute of Technology in the United Kingdom. Before entering politics he worked as a public servant. He was Secretary General of the Cook Islands Party from 1968 to 1999.

He was first elected to Parliament for the seat of Murienua in a by-election in 1991.

== Cabinet ==
Marsters served as Minister of Works in the Cabinet of Sir Geoffrey Henry, but resigned his position in 1997 in protest at budget cuts. He later served as Minister of Works, Youth, Sport and Recreation in the first coalition Cabinet of Robert Woonton from 2002 to 2003. He rejoined Cabinet after the 2004 election, when Woonton was trying to put together a new coalition; when Woonton resigned to fight a by-election, he served in the Cabinet of Jim Marurai, holding the portfolios of foreign affairs, transport, and youth and sport.

In August 2005, Marurai sacked Cook Islands Party leader Sir Geoffrey Henry from Cabinet, causing the CIP to reconsider its role in government. A month later, Marsters was also sacked, and the coalition formally dissolved.

== Opposition ==
The retirement of Sir Geoffrey Henry in 2006 led to a leadership election, which saw Marsters replaced as Deputy leader by Tupou Faireka. However, both Faireka and party leader Henry Puna lost their seats at the 2006 election. While Puna continued to serve as leader outside parliament, Marsters became leader of the opposition.

== Deputy Prime Minister ==
Marsters was re-elected at the 2010 elections, which saw the Cook Islands Party win 16 of the 24 seats. Henry Puna was elected Prime Minister, and Marsters was appointed to Cabinet as Deputy Prime Minister, Minister of Foreign Affairs, and Minister of Mining and Natural Resources. As Minister of Mining and Natural Resources he promoted seabed mining, and negotiated a Regional Seabed Mining Framework through the Pacific Islands Forum. he began negotiations with the Cook Island's neighbours over marine boundaries, and sent a delegation to the United Nations in New York to negotiate an extension of the country's continental shelf boundaries under the United Nations Convention on the Law of the Sea.

== Sovereign's Representative ==
On 5 June 2013, Marsters was appointed as the Queen's Representative, replacing Sir Frederick Goodwin. He resigned from Parliament on 25 July 2013 to take up the role, precipitating the 2013 Murienua by-election. In June 2016, he made a rare intervention as Queen's Representative, ruling that Parliament had been properly adjourned and that therefore a purported opposition vote of no-confidence ousting the government was of no effect. He was reappointed for a second three-year term in July 2016, and a third one in 2019.

In the 2018 Queen's Birthday Honours, Marsters was appointed a Knight Commander of the Order of the British Empire. His investiture took place in November 2018 in a ceremony at Buckingham Palace.

In January 2019, Marsters helped turn the first sod and lay the first stones of Marsters House, a hostel for the various branches of the Marsters family in Rarotonga. The hostel was opened in July 2019.

In August 2025, Marsters was reappointed as the representative for a fifth three-year term.

== Notes ==
Government offices
Preceded by Sir Frederick Tutu Goodwin	Queen's / King's Representative to the Cook Islands; 2013–present	Incumbent
