= Manihiki (electorate) =

Electoral division of the Cook Islands

- Constituency for the Parliament of the Cook Islands
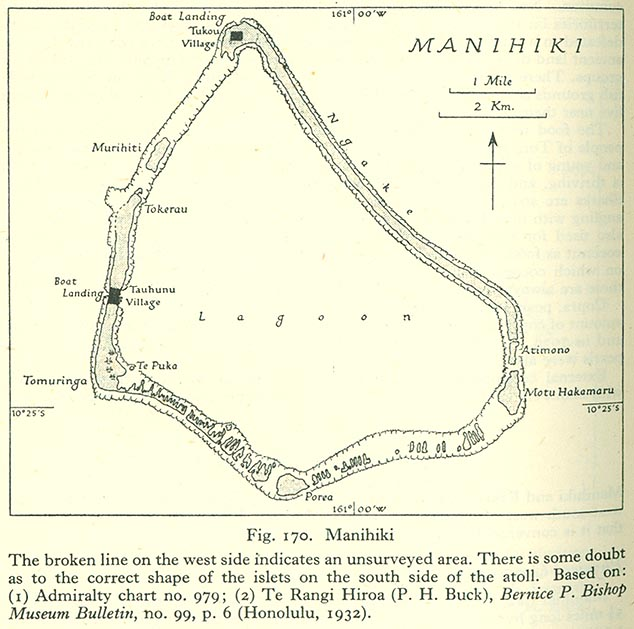
- Region: Outer Islands

Current constituency
- Number of members: 1
- Member: George Angene

Manihiki is a Cook Islands electoral division returning one member to the Cook Islands Parliament. Its current representative is George Angene, who has held the seat since 2026.

The electorate consists of the island of Manihiki.

== Members of Parliament for Manihiki ==
Unless otherwise stated, all MPs terms began and ended at general elections.

Name	Party	Elected	Left Office	Reason
George Ellis	Cook Islands Party	1983 (Mar)	1983 (Nov)	Defeated
Ben Toma	Democrat	1983 (Nov), 1989	1994	Unknown
Robert Woonton	Democrat	1994, 1999	2004	Resigned after tie in 2004
Henry Puna	Cook Islands Party	2005 by-election	2006	Defeated
Apii Piho	Democrat	2006	2010	Defeated
Henry Puna	Cook Islands Party	2010	2021	Retired
Akaiti Puna	Cook Islands Party	2021 by-election, 2022	2026	Defeated
George Angene	Independent	2026		

== Election results ==
=== 2026 election ===
2026 Cook Islands general election: Manihiki
Party	Candidate	Votes	%	±%
Independent	George Maggie Angene	56	45.9	
Cook Islands	Akaiti Puna^{†}	51	41.8	
Independent	Puapii William	15	12.3	
Turnout		122		
Independent gain from Cook Islands		Swing		
^{†} incumbent

=== 2010 election ===
Cook Islands general election, 2010: Manihiki
Party	Candidate	Votes	%	±%
Cook Islands	Henry Puna	100	54.64	▲5.74
Democratic	Apii Piho	73	39.89	▼11.21
Independent	Rangi Mitaera	10	5.46	
Turnout		183	100.0	

=== 2006 election ===
Cook Islands general election, 2006: Manihiki
Party	Candidate	Votes	%	±%
Democratic	Apii Piho	115	51.1	
Cook Islands	Henry Puna	110	48.9	
Turnout		225	100.0	

=== 2005 Byelection ===
Manihiki by-election, 2005
Party	Candidate	Votes	%	±%
Cook Islands	Henry Puna	120	54.5%	
Democratic	Apii Piho	100	45.5%	
Turnout		220		

=== 2004 election ===
Cook Islands general election, 2004: Manihiki
Party	Candidate	Votes	%	±%
Democratic	Robert Woonton	142	50.7	
Cook Islands	Henry Puna	138	49.3	
Turnout		280	100.0	
