= King's Representative in the Cook Islands =

Vice-regal representative in the Cook Islands

King's Representative
- Te Kauono o te Ariki
- Coat of arms of the Cook Islands

- Flag of the king's representative

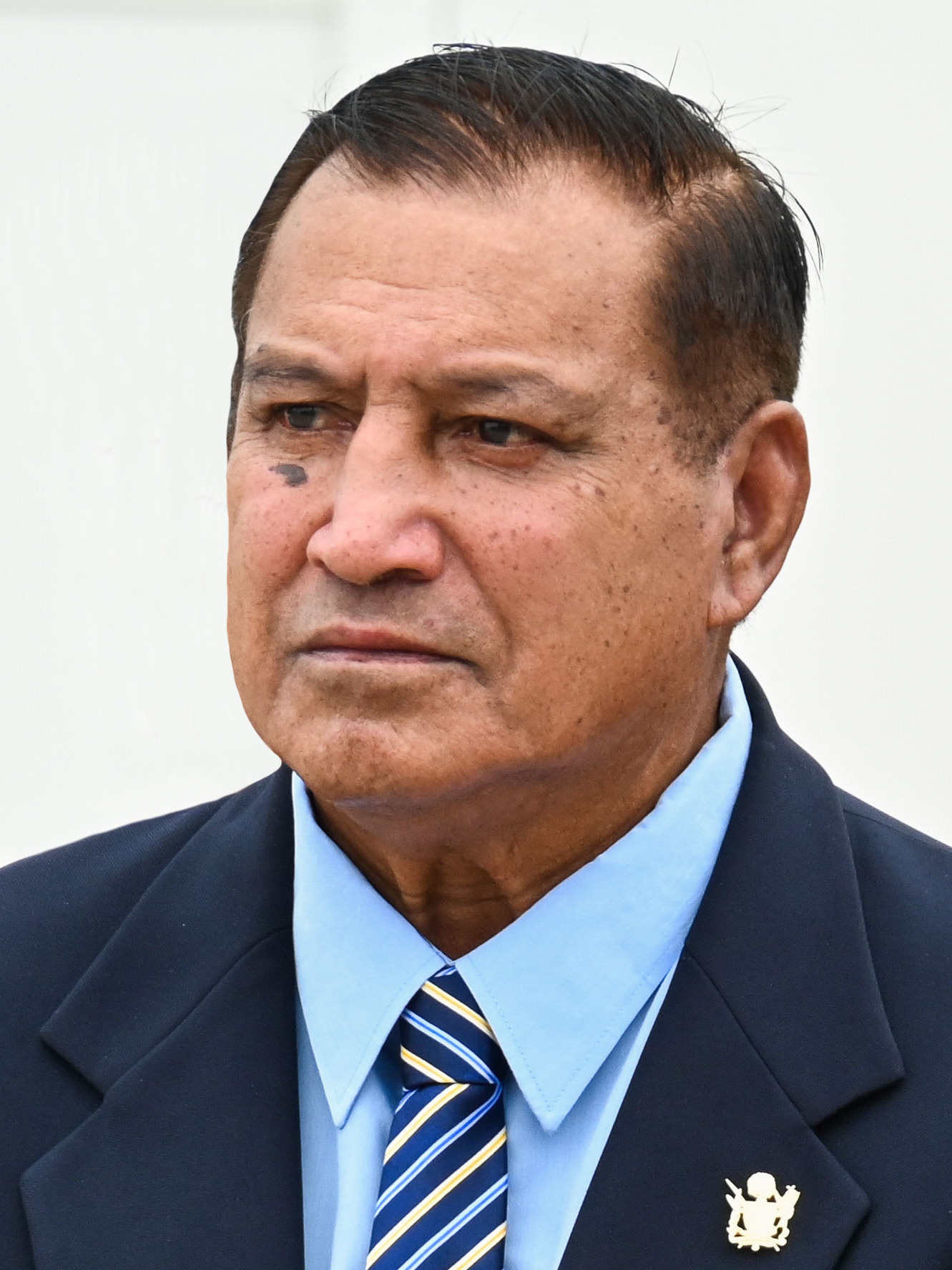
- Incumbent; Sir Tom Marsters since 27 July 2013
- Type: Viceroy
- Abbreviation: KR
- Seat: Avarua
- Nominator: Prime Minister of the Cook Islands
- Appointer: Monarch; on the advice of the prime minister
- Term length: 3 years; renewable
- Precursor: High Commissioner of the Cook Islands
- Formation: 1982
- First holder: Gaven Donne

The king's representative (Cook Islands Māori: Te Kauono o te Ariki), or KR, is the official representative of Charles III, as King of the realm of New Zealand, in the Cook Islands. The office of King's Representative is established by the Constitution of the Cook Islands. They are appointed by the King for a term of three years, and may be reappointed. When the Cook Islands has a queen regnant, the viceroy is titled queen's representative (QR).

The king's representative fills the role normally filled by a governor-general in the Westminster system of a Commonwealth realm, being both a representative of the monarch and the titular head of executive government. They appoint the prime minister and Cabinet and chair the Cook Islands Executive Council. In performing their duties, they must act on the advice of their government.

Originally these duties were performed by the high commissioner of New Zealand to the Cook Islands, but in 1982 these powers were repatriated and the office of Queen's Representative was established. The governor-general of New Zealand still represents the king in matters pertaining to the entire realm.

Following the death of Elizabeth II, the office formally became known as "King's Representative". As of 2026, however, the office is still referred to throughout the constitution as the "Queen's Representative".

In August 2025, Tom Marsters was reappointed as the representative for a fifth three-year term.

== List of sovereign's representatives in the Cook Islands ==
| № | Portrait | Name | Term of office | | | Monarch | Prime Minister |
| № | Portrait | Name | Took office | Left office | Length of office | Monarch | Prime Minister |
|---|---|---|---|---|---|---|---|
| 1 | | Sir Gaven Donne (1914–2010) | 1982 | 18 September 1984 | 2 years, 258 days | Elizabeth II | Sir Tom Davis |
| 1 | | Sir Gaven Donne (1914–2010) | 1982 | 18 September 1984 | 2 years, 258 days | Elizabeth II | Geoffrey Henry |
| 1 | | Sir Gaven Donne (1914–2010) | 1982 | 18 September 1984 | 2 years, 258 days | Elizabeth II | Sir Tom Davis |
| 2 | | Sir Graham Speight (1921–2008); Acting | 18 September 1984 | 19 December 1984 | 92 days | Elizabeth II | Sir Tom Davis |
| 3 | | Sir Tangaroa Tangaroa (1921–2009) | 19 December 1984 | 19 December 1990 | 6 years, 1 day | Elizabeth II | Sir Tom Davis |
| 3 | | Sir Tangaroa Tangaroa (1921–2009) | 19 December 1984 | 19 December 1990 | 6 years, 1 day | Elizabeth II | Pupuke Robati |
| 3 | | Sir Tangaroa Tangaroa (1921–2009) | 19 December 1984 | 19 December 1990 | 6 years, 1 day | Elizabeth II | Sir Geoffrey Henry |
| 4 | | Sir Apenera Pera Short (1916–2011) | 19 December 1990 | 14 November 2000 | 9 years, 327 days | Elizabeth II | Sir Geoffrey Henry |
| 4 | | Sir Apenera Pera Short (1916–2011) | 19 December 1990 | 14 November 2000 | 9 years, 327 days | Elizabeth II | Joe Williams |
| 4 | | Sir Apenera Pera Short (1916–2011) | 19 December 1990 | 14 November 2000 | 9 years, 327 days | Elizabeth II | Sir Terepai Maoate |
| 5 | | Laurence Greig (born 1929); Acting | 14 November 2000 | 9 February 2001 | 88 days | Elizabeth II | Sir Terepai Maoate |
| 6 | | Sir Frederick Tutu Goodwin (born 1940) | 9 February 2001 | 27 July 2013 | 12 years, 169 days | Elizabeth II | Sir Terepai Maoate |
| 6 | | Sir Frederick Tutu Goodwin (born 1940) | 9 February 2001 | 27 July 2013 | 12 years, 169 days | Elizabeth II | Robert Woonton |
| 6 | | Sir Frederick Tutu Goodwin (born 1940) | 9 February 2001 | 27 July 2013 | 12 years, 169 days | Elizabeth II | Jim Marurai |
| 6 | | Sir Frederick Tutu Goodwin (born 1940) | 9 February 2001 | 27 July 2013 | 12 years, 169 days | Elizabeth II | Henry Puna |
| 7 | | Sir Tom Marsters (born 1945) | 27 July 2013 | Incumbent | 13 years, 98 days | Elizabeth II | Henry Puna |
| 7 | | Sir Tom Marsters (born 1945) | 27 July 2013 | Incumbent | 13 years, 98 days | Elizabeth II | Mark Brown |
| 7 | | Sir Tom Marsters (born 1945) | 27 July 2013 | Incumbent | 13 years, 98 days | Charles III | Mark Brown |

== See also ==
- Monarchy in the Cook Islands
- Resident Commissioner of the Cook Islands
