= Pihos =

Pihos is a surname. Notable people with the surname include:

- Pete Pihos (1923–2011), American football player and coach
- Sandra M. Pihos (born 1946), American politician

== See also ==
- Piho
