= Deputy Prime Minister of the Cook Islands =

Officer in the government of the Cook Islands

The deputy prime minister of the Cook Islands is the second most senior officer in the government of the Cook Islands. From 1965 to 1981, the position was called the deputy premier. When the office of premier was renamed to prime minister in 1981, the deputy premier became the deputy prime minister.

== List of officeholders ==
Key

Cook Islands Democratic New Alliance Independent

No.	Name	Term start	Term end	Party
1	Manea Tamarua	1965	1967	Cook Islands Party
2	Tiakana Numanga	1974	1977	Cook Islands Party
3	Apenera Short	1974	1978	Cook Islands Party
4	Pupuke Robati	25 July 1978	13 April 1983	Democratic Party
5	Geoffrey Henry	16 November 1983	1985	Cook Islands Party
6	Terepai Maoate	1985	1 February 1989	Democratic Party
7	Inatio Akaruru	1 February 1989	1999	Cook Islands Party
8	Norman George	June 1999	October 1999	New Alliance Party
9	Tupou Faireka	16 November 1999	18 November 1999	Cook Islands Party
(8)	Norman George	1 December 1999	July 2001	New Alliance Party
10	Robert Woonton	July 2001	11 February 2002	Democratic Party
(5)	Geoffrey Henry	11 February 2002	30 January 2003	Cook Islands Party
(6)	Terepai Maoate	30 January 2003	5 November 2003	Democratic Party
11	Ngamau Munokoa	5 November 2003	19 November 2004	Democratic Party
(5)	Geoffrey Henry	19 November 2004	9 August 2005	Cook Islands Party
(6)	Terepai Maoate	9 August 2005	23 December 2009	Democratic Party
12	Robert Wigmore	23 December 2009	30 November 2010	Democratic Party
13	Tom Marsters	2 December 2010	10 June 2013	Cook Islands Party
14	Teariki Heather	11 December 2013	14 June 2018	Cook Islands Party
15	Mark Brown	14 June 2018	1 October 2020	Cook Islands Party
16	Robert Tapaitau	1 October 2020	31 January 2024	Independent
17	Albert Nicholas	16 February 2024	Incumbent	Cook Islands Party
