= Piho =

Given name and family name

Piho is a surname and given name. Notable people with the name include:

- Apii Piho (born 1960), Cook Islands politician
- Han Hendrik Piho (born 1993), Estonian Nordic combined skier
- Kail Piho (born 1991), Estonian Nordic combined skier
- Piho Rua (born 1954), Cook Islands politician
- Nolay Piho (林慶台; born 1960), Atayal pastor and actor who cast as Mona Rudao in the Taiwanese film Warriors of the Rainbow: Seediq Bale
