= 2006 Matavera by-election =

Election in the Cook Islands

- 19 July 2006

Constituency of Matavera
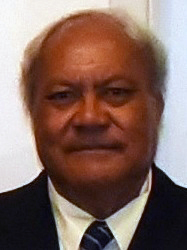
	First party	Second party
		DP
Candidate	Kiriau Turepu	Vaine Teokotai
Party	Cook Islands	Democratic
Popular vote	234	185
Percentage	55.85%	44.15%
MP before election
Peri Vaevae Pare
Democratic
Elected MP
Kiriau Turepu
Cook Islands

The 2006 Matavera by-election was a by-election in the Cook Islands seat of Matavera. It took place on 19 July 2006, and was precipitated by the conviction of former Police Minister Peri Vaevae Pare for fraud.

The by-election was won by Cook Islands Party candidate Kiriau Turepu. As a result, the government lost its majority, and dissolved Parliament to avoid a confidence vote, precipitating the 2006 general election.

Matavera by-election 2006
Party	Candidate	Votes	%	±%
Cook Islands	Kiriau Turepu	234	55.8	
Democratic	Vaine Teokotai	185	44.2	
Turnout		419	100	
