= 2021 Manihiki by-election =

Election in Cook Island

A by-election was held in the Cook Islands electorate of Manihiki on 5 May 2021. The by-election was triggered by the resignation of former Prime Minister Henry Puna in order to take up the job of Secretary General of the Pacific Islands Forum.

On 7 April 2021 businessman Temu Okotai announced that he would contest the election as an independent. On 8 April the Democratic Party announced Munokoa Maraeara as their candidate. On 13 April the Cook Islands Party announced Akaiti Puna, wife of former MP Henry Puna, as their candidate.

The election was won by Akaiti Puna.

== Results ==
Candidate	Party	Votes	%
Akaiti Puna	Cook Islands Party	82	68.33
Munokoa Maraeara	Democratic Party	33	27.50
Temu Okotai	Independent	5	4.17
Total		120	100.00
