= Gaven Donne =

New Zealand judge

Sir Gaven Donne KBE
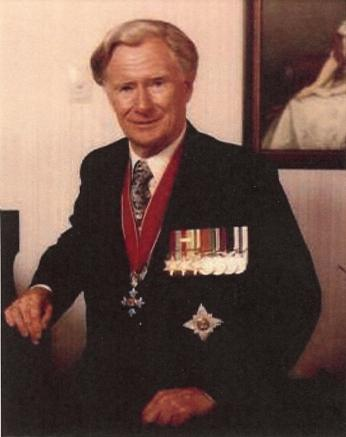

1st Queen's Representative to the Cook Islands
- In office 1982 – 18 September 1984
- Monarch: Elizabeth II
- Prime Minister: Tom Davis; Geoffrey Henry
- Preceded by: Office Established
- Succeeded by: Sir Graham Speight (Acting)

Personal details
- Born: Gaven John Donne; 8 May 1914 Christchurch, New Zealand
- Died: 28 March 2010 (aged 95) Otaramarae, New Zealand

Sir Gaven John Donne KBE (8 May 1914 – 28 March 2010) was a New Zealander jurist who served as the Chief Justice of Samoa, Cooks Islands and Niue, Nauru, and Tuvalu. He was the Queen's Representative in the Cook Islands from 1982 to 1984.

== Early life and education ==
Gaven Donne was born in Christchurch, New Zealand, on 8 May 1914. He was educated at Palmerston North Boys' High School, Hastings Boys' High School, Victoria University College, and Auckland University College. He was admitted to the bar in 1938. During World War II, Donne served in the 2nd New Zealand Expeditionary Force in the Middle East and Italy from 1941 to 1945.

== Career ==
Donne became a magistrate in 1958, and remained on the court for 40 years. In 1969, he was seconded to the Supreme Court of Samoa, and in 1972 he was appointed Chief Justice of Samoa. In 1975 he was appointed Chief Justice of the Cook Islands and Niue. In 1978, he presided over the electoral petitions resulting from the 1978 Cook Islands election, which saw the Cook Islands Party of Albert Henry removed from power for electoral fraud.

In 1982 he was appointed as the first Queen's Representative to the Cook Islands. After completing his term, he became Chief Justice of Nauru and Tuvalu in 1985.

Donne retired from the bench in 2001 making him one of the longest serving judges in the Southern Hemisphere.

== Personal life ==
Donne started to notice his eyesight deteriorating in 1999, and was diagnosed with macular degeneration. He attributed his failing eyesight to his military service as he served in the bright sunlight without sunglasses. He fathered four children. Donne died in Otaramarae, New Zealand, on 28 March 2010.

== Honours and awards ==
In 1977, Donne was awarded the Queen Elizabeth II Silver Jubilee Medal. In the 1979 New Year Honours, he was appointed a Knight Commander of the Order of the British Empire.

Court offices
| New title | Chief Justice of Niue; 1975–1982 | Succeeded by Heta Hingston |
