= Tupou Faireka =

Cook Islands politician

Tupou Alfred Faireka is a Cook Islands politician and former deputy leader of the Cook Islands Party. He was an MP for 13 years and served as a Cabinet Minister.

Faireka was first elected to Parliament in 1993, representing the constituency of Tupapa-Maraerenga. He served as Leader of the House in the coalition government of Robert Woonton, before being appointed as a Parliamentary Undersecretary in October 2002. He was appointed to the coalition Cabinet of Jim Marurai as Minister of Justice, Agriculture and Marine Resources in December 2004, but was sacked in September 2005 after a coalition realignment.

In 2006, shortly before the 2006 election, Faireka was elected deputy leader of the Cook Islands Party. He subsequently lost his seat to Democratic Party member John Tangi.
