= Kiriau Turepu =

Cook Islands politician

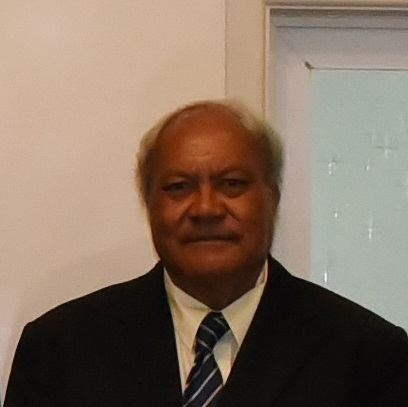
- Kiriau Turepu in 2017

Minister of Agriculture
- In office 24 July 2013 – 14 June 2018
- Prime Minister: Henry Puna
- Preceded by: Nandi Glassie
- Succeeded by: Rose Toki-Brown

Minister for the Environment
- In office 3 November 2013 – 14 June 2018
- Preceded by: Henry Puna
- Succeeded by: Robert Tapaitau

Minister of Business, Trade and Investment Board
- In office 3 November 2013 – 14 June 2018
- Preceded by: Mark Brown
- Succeeded by: George Angene

Member of the Cook Islands Parliament for Matavera
- In office 17 November 2010 – 14 June 2018
- Preceded by: Cassey Eggelton
- Succeeded by: Vaitoti Tupa
- In office 19 July 2006 – 27 September 2006
- Preceded by: Peri Vaevae Pare
- Succeeded by: Cassey Eggelton

Personal details
- Party: Cook Islands Party

Kiriau Turepu is a Cook Islands politician and former Cabinet Minister. He is a member of the Cook Islands Party. He is a Mataiapo of the Ngāti Maoate tribe.

Turepu was educated at Northland College in New Zealand. He later studied agriculture at Massey University before working as a public servant in the agriculture department. He later become a grower and fruit exporter. He represented the Cook Islands in tennis at the 1971 South Pacific Games in Papeete, Tahiti.

Turepu was first elected to Parliament in the 2006 Matavera by-election. As a result, the government lost its majority and dissolved Parliament to avoid a confidence vote. He was unsuccessful in the ensuing 2006 election, but was re-elected at the 2010 election.

== Cabinet Minister ==
In May 2011 Turepu was made associate minister of agriculture. In July 2013 he was appointed to Cabinet proper as Minister of Agriculture. In November 2013 he was also given responsibility for the Business and Environment portfolios. He was re-elected at the 2014 election, In 2017 he established the Marae Moana marine sanctuary, which at the time was the largest multiple-use marine protected area in the world.

He lost his seat in the 2018 election to Vaitoti Tupa.
