= Henry Puna =

Prime Minister of the Cook Islands from 2010 to 2020

The Honourable Henry Puna
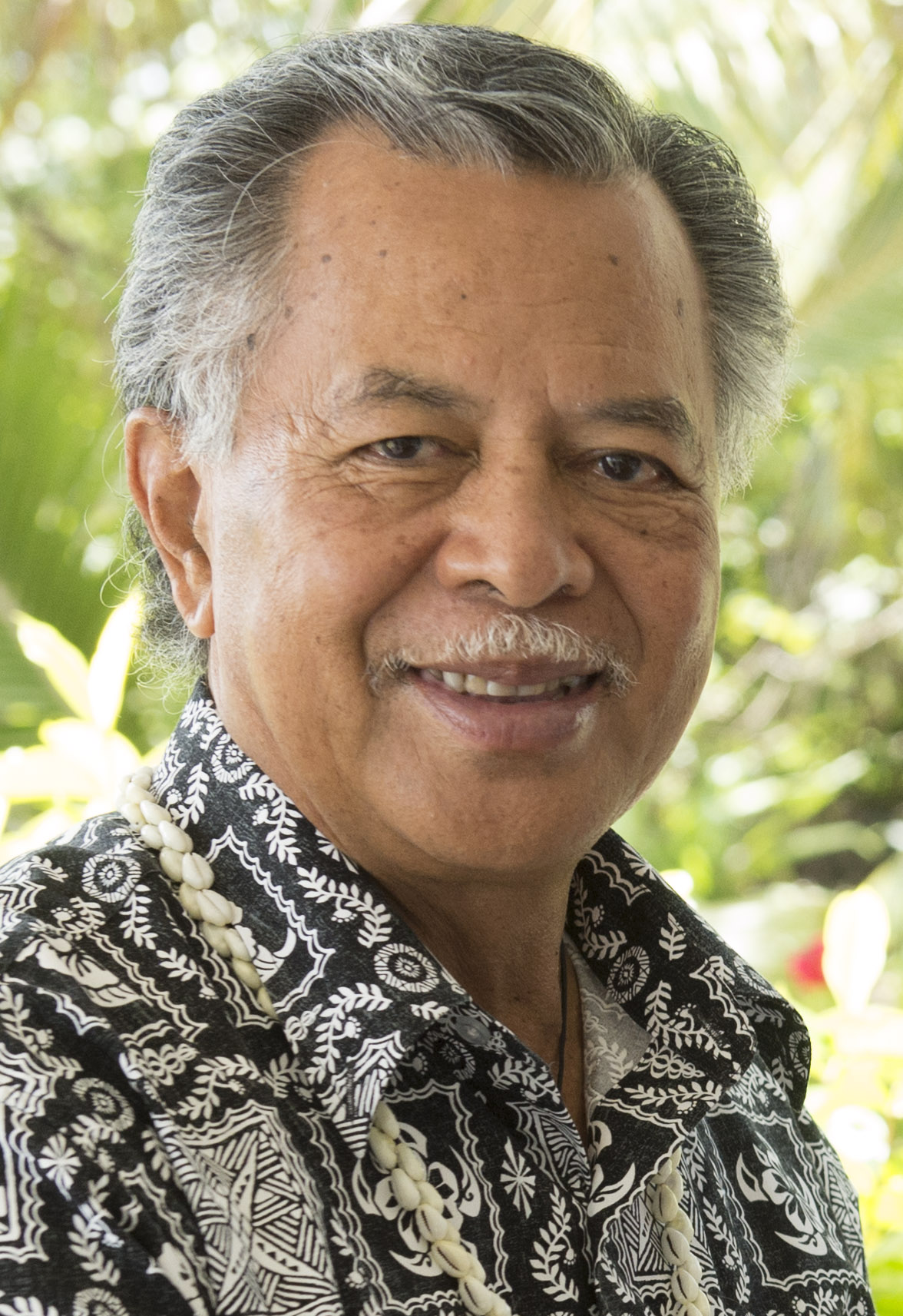

Secretary General of the Pacific Islands Forum
- In office 24 May 2021 – 23 May 2024
- Preceded by: Meg Taylor
- Succeeded by: Baron Waqa

Prime Minister of the Cook Islands
- In office 30 November 2010 – 1 October 2020
- Monarch: Elizabeth II
- Deputy: Tom Marsters; Teariki Heather; Mark Brown
- Queen's Representative: Frederick Tutu Goodwin; Tom Marsters
- Preceded by: Jim Marurai
- Succeeded by: Mark Brown
Additional Ministries
Minister of Energy
In office 3 December 2010 – 1 October 2020
Prime Minister	Himself
Preceded by	Smiley Heather
Succeeded by	Mark Brown
Minister of Foreign Affairs
In office 3 November 2013 – 1 October 2020
Prime Minister	Himself
Preceded by	Tom Marsters
Succeeded by	Mark Brown
Minister of Marine Resources
In office 3 November 2013 – 1 October 2020
Prime Minister	Himself
Preceded by	Teina Bishop
Succeeded by	Mark Brown
Minister of Education
In office 17 December 2014 – 4 June 2020
Prime Minister	Himself
Preceded by	Mona Ioane
Succeeded by	Vaine Mokoroa
Minister of Transport
In office 3 November 2013 – 20 September 2018
Prime Minister	Himself
Preceded by	Tom Marsters
Succeeded by	Robert Tapaitau
Minister of Police
In office March 2020 – 1 October 2020
Prime Minister	Himself
Preceded by	Vaine Mokoroa
Succeeded by	Mark Brown
In office 3 December 2010 – 17 April 2012
Prime Minister	Himself
Preceded by	Jim Marurai
Succeeded by	Teariki Heather
Minister for the Environment
In office 3 December 2010 – 3 November 2013
Prime Minister	Himself
Preceded by	Cassey Eggelton
Succeeded by	Kiriau Turepu
Minister of Justice
In office 3 December 2010 – 3 November 2013
Prime Minister	Himself
Preceded by	Apii Piho
Succeeded by	Teariki Heather

Member of the Cook Islands Parliament for Manihiki
- In office 17 November 2010 – 24 March 2021
- Preceded by: Apii Piho
- Succeeded by: Akaiti Puna
- In office 8 February 2005 – 27 September 2006
- Preceded by: Robert Woonton
- Succeeded by: Apii Piho

Personal details
- Born: 29 July 1949 (age 77) Aitutaki, Cook Islands
- Party: Cook Islands Party
- Spouse: Akaiti Puna
- Children: 5
- Education: University of Auckland; University of Tasmania

Henry Tuakeu Puna (born 29 July 1949) is a Cook Islands politician. He most recently served as the secretary-general of the Pacific Islands Forum from May 2021 to 2024. He was Prime Minister of the Cook Islands from November 2010 to October 2020, and since 2006, he has been leader of the Cook Islands Party.

Puna was elected to the Parliament of the Cook Islands at the 2005 Manihiki by-election. He lost his seat at the 2006 election, but regained it in the CIP victory at the 2010 election which saw him elected prime minister. During his time as prime minister, he held various ministerial portfolios, including Foreign affairs, Marine Resources, and Energy.

In June 2020, Puna announced his intention to stand down as prime minister in September to compete for the role of secretary-general of the Pacific Islands Forum. He stepped down from office on 1 October 2020. On 4 February 2021 he was elected as secretary-general, replacing Meg Taylor.

== Early life ==
Puna grew up in Aitutaki. He was educated on Aitutaki and Rarotonga before studying law at the University of Auckland in New Zealand and the University of Tasmania in Australia. He worked as a lawyer, public-servant and pearl-farmer before entering politics. In September 1999 he was appointed Cook Islands High Commissioner to New Zealand. He was replaced in 2000 by Wilkie Rasmussen.

Puna's father, Tuakeu Manuela, was a Member of the Legislative Assembly, and his older brothers William Estall and Ngereteina Puna both served as Cabinet Ministers, also his brother Manuela Puna served as Clerk of the Cook Islands Parliament.

== Political career ==
Puna first stood for Parliament at the 2004 election, contesting Prime Minister Robert Woonton's seat of Manihiki. He narrowly lost the seat on election night, but challenged the result in an election petition. The petition was upheld, with several voters being disqualified; the subsequent recount produced a tie, precipitating the 2005 Manihiki by-election which Puna ultimately won.

In September 2006, following the retirement of party leader Geoffrey Henry, Puna was elected leader of the Cook Islands Party. He subsequently lost his seat in the Manihiki constituency to Apii Piho in the 2006 election, but continued to serve as leader outside Parliament. Because he was not a member of Parliament, Puna was not the leader of the opposition; this position was filled by Tom Marsters. Puna worked as a lawyer and pearl farmer during his time out of parliament.

In September 2009, Puna was unanimously re-elected party leader.

== Prime Minister (2010–2020) ==
=== First term: 2010–2014 ===
Puna was re-elected as MP for Manihiki during the 2010 election, in which his party won 16 of the 24 seats. On 30 November 2010 he was sworn in as Prime Minister of the Cook Islands. He announced his initial Cabinet four days later, on 3 December. Puna's initial policy priorities were to boost the economy and negotiate a new aid relationship with New Zealand. Shortly after being elected, Puna faced international condemnation after suggesting that the Cook Islands' first HIV victim should be quarantined or deported to prevent the disease from spreading. In February 2011 he shifted the focus of state-owned enterprises from making profits to providing improved services, and announced greater transparency over the travel costs of Ministers and MPs. In May 2011 he expanded his Cabinet, adding three associate Ministers. In July 2011 he announced a long-term renewable energy programme, with an initial goal of reaching 50% renewable electricity by 2015, and 100% by 2020. Backed by funding from Australia, New Zealand, and the Asian Development Bank, the northern islands were converted to solar power in 2015 with the southern group following in 2019. Work on Rarotonga is ongoing.

In August 2011, he made his first formal visit to New Zealand as Prime Minister ahead of the Pacific Islands Forum in Auckland. In September 2011 he announced that his government would establish a one million square kilometer marine protected area in the southern Cook Islands. This plan would later evolve into the Marae Moana and be enshrined in law in 2017. In November 2011 the Cook Islands became a founding member of the Polynesian Leaders Group, a regional grouping intended to cooperate on a variety of issues including culture and language, education, responses to climate change, and trade and investment. In April 2012 he conducted a minor Cabinet reshuffle, trading the Police portfolio to Teariki Heather and taking up the Outer islands portfolio instead. In August 2012 Puna took over the rotating chair of the Pacific Islands Forum after hosting US Secretary of State Hillary Clinton at the annual Pacific Islands Forum meeting. This led to a greater focus on wider Pacific issues of sustainability and climate change and criticism from the opposition that domestic issues were being ignored. While Forum Chair, he called for the restoration of democracy in Fiji following the 2006 Fijian coup d'état and for stronger action on climate change.

In April 2013, he expressed opposition to same-sex marriage and declared that the Cook Islands would not be following New Zealand in legislating for marriage equality. In August 2013 Marine Resources Minister Teina Bishop was stood down from Cabinet following allegations of corruption and fraud in his handling of his portfolio. He was dropped from Cabinet entirely during a reshuffle in November, but later reinstated in January 2014. In the intervening period Puna's government faced public protests over a decision to tax New Zealand superannuation payments. In April 2014 Puna made a controversial decision to dissolve Parliament early for elections, leading to the resignation of Teina Bishop from Cabinet and his departure from the Cook Islands Party.

=== Second term: 2014–2018 ===
Puna's government eked out a narrow victory in the 2014 Cook Islands general election, winning 13 of 24 seats on a minority of the votes, but lost its majority after electoral petitions. A period of instability followed, with Puna considering forming a coalition, but the defection of Albert Nicholas to the government in exchange for a cabinet position and the government's victory in the 2015 Vaipae-Tautu by-election restored its majority.

During the by-election campaign Puna announced that a referendum would be held on Aitutaki to decide whether aircraft would be able to fly there on a Sunday. Residents voted to scrap the flights, but Puna refused to say whether he would accept the result. Eventually, in 2016, Puna announced that his government would not act on the referendum result.

In June 2015, Puna announced plans for the Cook Islands to join the United Nations. The plan was immediately ruled out by New Zealand Prime Minister John Key, who saw it as necessarily requiring independence and an end to shared citizenship. In August 2015 Puna's government hosted a large New Zealand delegation to celebrations marking 50 years of self-government. Later that month he was re-elected as leader of the Cook Islands Party. At a meeting with John Key in Auckland he criticised new Zealand's inaction on climate change, and called on the New Zealand government to do more to reduce greenhouse gas emissions. In December 2015 he attended the 2015 United Nations Climate Change Conference in Paris, France, where he joined other Pacific leaders in accusing the world of dragging its feet.

In February 2016, news emerged that Deputy Prime Minister Teariki Heather was being investigated for corruption by the Financial Intelligence Unit. Puna refused to suspend him. In March 2016 Puna's government signed a fisheries agreement with the European Union allowing European vessels to use controversial purse seining in Cook Islands waters. After opposition from Cabinet the decision was reviewed by a Parliamentary select committee, but was ultimately ratified in October. A month later Puna announced that the Marae Moana marine park, planned since 2011, would cover the country's entire exclusive economic zone. In March 2017 this was reinforced with a 50-nautical-mile exclusion zone around each island in the country, in which commercial fishing and seabed mining were banned. The required legislation was passed in July 2017.

=== Third term: 2018–2020 ===
In the 2018 election the Cook Islands Party lost its majority, winning only 10 of 24 seats, but Puna was able to put together a coalition by offering cabinet positions to the One Cook Islands Movement's George Angene and independents Robert Tapaitau and Rose Toki-Brown. The coalition was further strengthened by the defection to the government of Te-Hani Brown in early 2019. Puna's government continued to emphasize a need for action on climate change, while expanding its diplomatic ties. In November 2019 Puna announced his government's intention to ratify the PACER Plus trade agreement.

In December 2019, a private prosecution for fraud was lodged against Puna and Deputy Prime Minister Mark Brown, alleging that a government-chartered aircraft had been misused. In March 2021 the charges were dismissed by the High Court.

In 2020, Puna led his government's response to the COVID-19 pandemic. On 29 March 2020, while New Zealand was in lockdown, he announced plans for a quarantine station in Auckland to allow Cook islanders in the country to return home. The plan was cancelled after opposition from the New Zealand government. When the Cook Islands was declared COVID-free in April, the focus turned to re-opening borders and repatriating Cook Islanders overseas. In early June, Puna announced plans to re-open borders to Cook Islanders and work permit holders who had been living in New Zealand, and expressed hopes for a tourism "bubble".

In June 2020 he surrendered his Education portfolio and was appointed Police Minister in a Cabinet reshuffle.

On 17 June 2020 Puna announced his intention to stand down as Prime Minister in September to compete for the role of Secretary-General of the Pacific Islands Forum. He was replaced by Mark Brown.

On 24 March 2021 Puna resigned as an MP, triggering the 2021 Manihiki by-election.

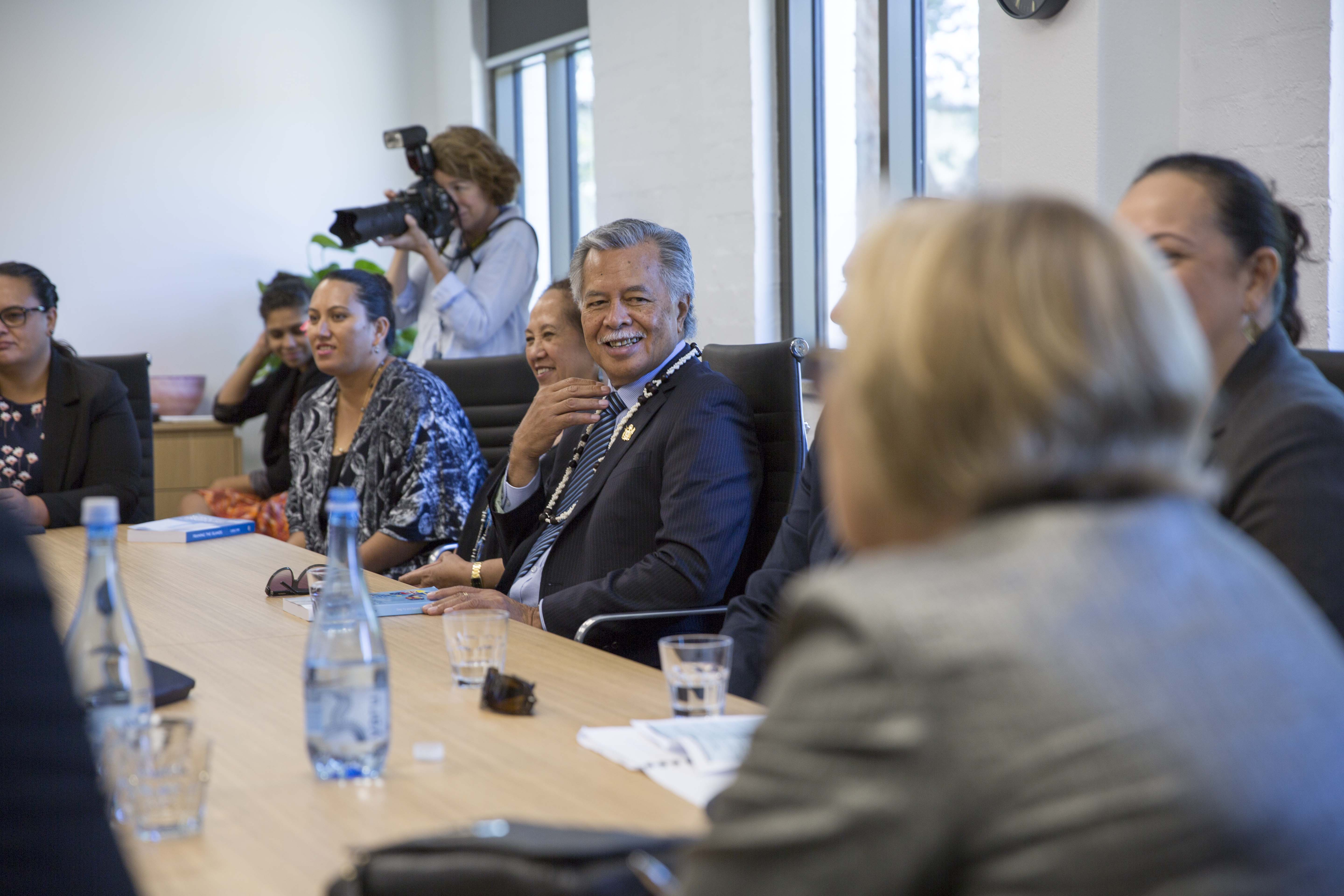
Prime Minister Puna visits The Australian National University College of Law on 11 November 2019.

== Secretary-general (2021–2024) ==
On 4 February 2021 he was elected as secretary-general of the Pacific Islands Forum, replacing Meg Taylor. In response to his election, Palau announced that it would be leaving the Pacific Islands Forum, claiming that a "gentlemen's agreement" to rotate the position between Polynesia, Melanesia, and Micronesia had been violated. Other countries have signaled their intention to review their Membership after Puna's election. MPs in the Marshall Islands called for the government to review its participation in the Forum, but opposed withdrawal. The Federated States of Micronesia and Nauru have openly questioned whether they will remain members. Nauru President Lionel Aingimea has signaled his intention to pull out, stating that "If this is the way Micronesia is treated, then it is better off withdrawing from the Forum". Four members of the Micronesian bloc – the Marshall Islands, Kiribati, Nauru, and the Federated States of Micronesia – decided to hold a virtual meeting to discuss whether to exit the Forum. Puna assumed the office of secretary-general in May 2021.

He vacated the role at the end of his first term on 23 May 2024. He was succeeded by Baron Waqa of Nauru.

== Personal life ==
Puna is a member of the Seventh-day Adventist Church.

Assembly seats
Preceded by Robert Woonton	Member of Parliament for Manihiki; 2005–2006	Succeeded by Apii Piho
Preceded by Apii Piho	Member of Parliament for Manihiki; 2010–2021	Succeeded by Akaiti Puna
Party political offices
Preceded by Geoffrey Henry	Leader of the Cook Islands Party; 2006–2020	Succeeded by Mark Brown
Political offices
Preceded by Jim Marurai	Prime Minister of the Cook Islands; 2010–2020	Succeeded by Mark Brown
Preceded by Apii Piho	Minister of Justice; 2010–2013	Succeeded by Teariki Heather
Preceded by Cassey Eggelton	Minister for the Environment; 2010–2013	Succeeded by Kiriau Turepu
Preceded by Jim Marurai	Minister of Police; 2010–2012	Succeeded by Teariki Heather
Preceded by Tom Marsters	Minister of Transport; 2013–2018	Succeeded by Robert Tapaitau
Preceded by Mona Ioane	Minister of Education; 2014–2020	Succeeded by Vaine Mokoroa
Preceded by Teina Bishop	Minister of Marine Resources; 2013–2018	Succeeded by Mark Brown
Preceded by Tom Marsters	Minister of Foreign Affairs; 2013–2020	Succeeded by Mark Brown
Preceded by Smiley Heather	Minister of Energy; 2010–2020	Succeeded by Mark Brown
Diplomatic posts
Preceded by Meg Taylor	Secretary General of the Pacific Islands Forum; 2021–2024	Succeeded by Baron Waqa
