= Avele College =

Coordinates: 13°52′9.73″S 171°45′34″W

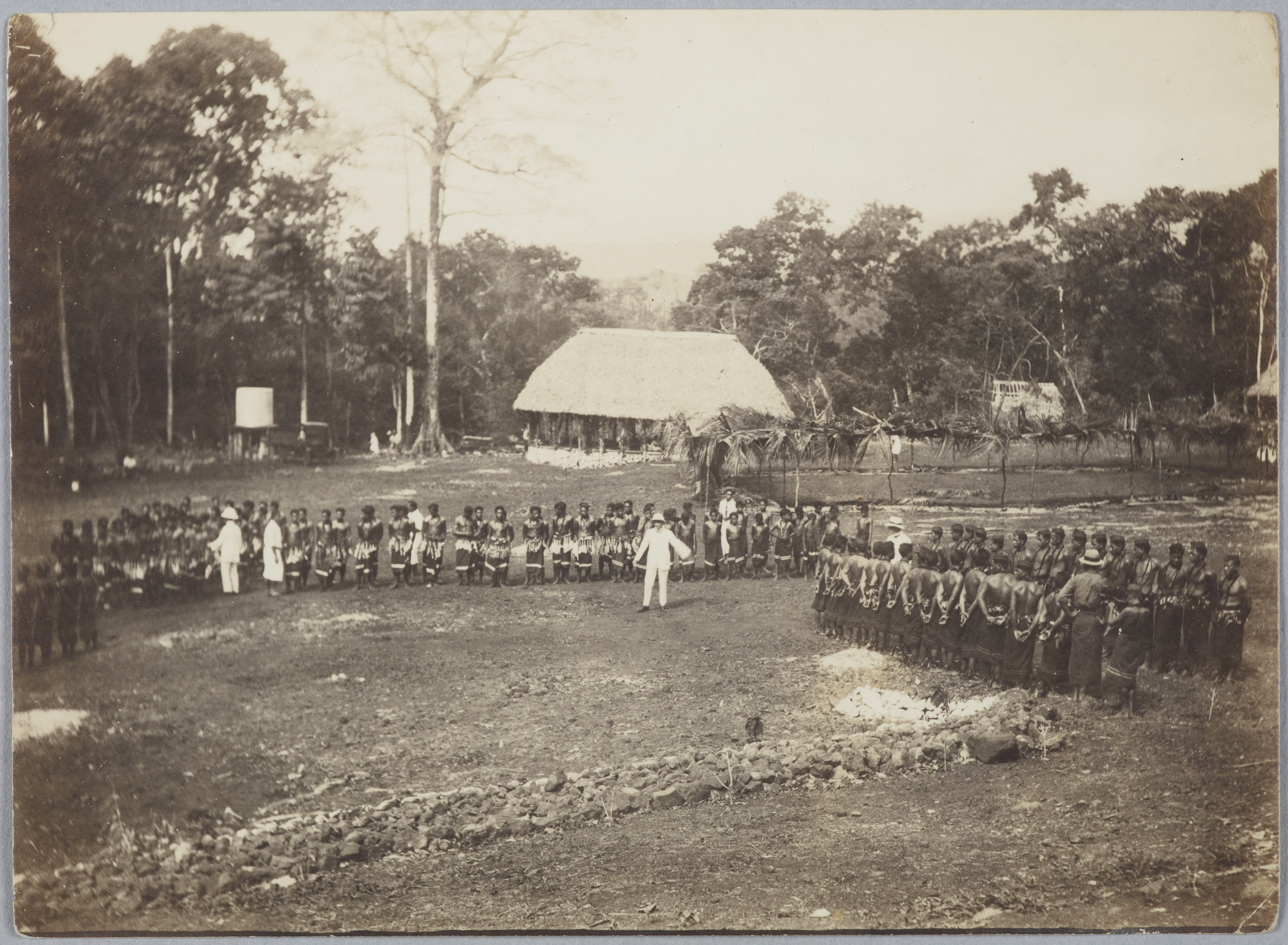
Opening of Avele School, 12 June 1924, 1924, Samoa, by Percy Williams.

Avele College is a secondary school in Vailima, a suburb of Apia in Samoa.

The school was founded in 1924 as a residential secondary school, and officially opened on 12 June 1924 by Administrator of Western Samoa George Spafford Richardson. In 1957 it was converted to a regional post-primary agricultural college, intended to serve students from across the South Pacific. The school was originally boys-only, and female students were not admitted until 1996.

In 2010 the school's library was destroyed by a fire.

In May 2016 the school was closed for two weeks and threatened with permanent closure after a series of brawls with students of rival Malua Fou College which saw 22 students charged.

The school celebrated its centenary in June 2024.

In July 2024 the school opened a new hall, part-funded by a grant from the Japanese embassy.

== Notable alumni ==
- Anapu Solofa, politician
- Vaʻai Kolone, former Prime Minister of Samoa
- Tom Marsters, King's Representative of the Cook Islands
- Paul Wallwork, weightlifter
- Tuiloma Pule Lameko, politician
- Don Opeloge, weightlifter
- Kolone Alefosio, athlete
- Olo Fiti Vaai, politician
