= Frederick Tutu Goodwin =

Cook Islands politician and former police officer

Sir Fred Goodwin KBE
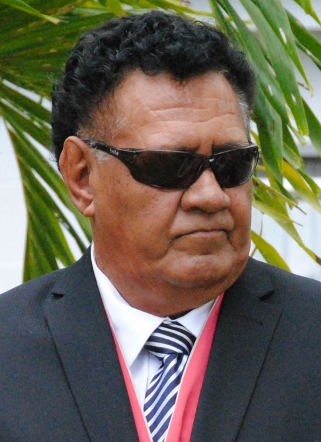
- Goodwin in 2012

6th Queen's Representative to the Cook Islands
- In office 9 February 2001 – 27 July 2013
- Monarch: Elizabeth II
- Prime Minister: Sir Terepai Maoate; Robert Woonton; Jim Marurai; Henry Puna
- Preceded by: Laurence Greig
- Succeeded by: Tom Marsters

Personal details
- Born: 13 September 1940 (age 85) Rarotonga, Cook Islands
- Party: Independent
- Spouse: Upokoina Tuavera (m. 1960)

Sir Frederick Tutu Goodwin KBE (born 13 September 1940) is a Cook Islands politician and former police officer, who was the 6th Queen's Representative to the Cook Islands.

Goodwin was born on Rarotonga on 13 September 1940. He joined the Cook Islands Police in 1956. He served as a constable, then joined the New Zealand Police Force for a short time, before returning to the Cook Islands, where he eventually rose to the rank of Police Superintendent.

On 17 September 1960, Goodwin married Mary Upokoina Teariki Tuavera at Matavera, Rarotonga.

Goodwin was elected to the Cook Islands Parliament at the 1978 election, representing the seat of Te Au O Tonga for the Democratic Party. He served as assistant minister of energy and works in the government of Tom Davis. He then worked as a public servant, before being appointed as Queen's Representative in 2001. In the Birthday Honours 2004 Goodwin was appointed as a Knight Commander of the Order of the British Empire for services to the community.

The decision to reappoint Goodwin for another three-year term as Queen's Representative was made in February 2010, and the Queen of New Zealand signed the warrant of appointment in July, to be effective 10 August 2010. Goodwin stepped down from the role as Queen's Representative on 27 July 2013, being replaced by former Cook Islands Cabinet Minister Tom Marsters.

Goodwin's sister-in-law is MP and Deputy Speaker of the Cook Islands Parliament Cassey Eggelton.
