= 2006 Akaoa by-election =

Election in the Cook Islands

The Akaoa by-election was a by-election in the Cook Islands seat of Akaoa. It took place on 29 November 2006, and was precipitated by the seat being a dead tie in the 2006 general election. After a judicial recount, the High Court ordered a by-election.

Both general election candidates contested the by-election. The poll was won by the Cook Islands Party's Teariki Heather. The by-election attracted a higher number of votes than the general election, in part because of a slight increase in enrolments.

Akaoa by-election 2006
Party	Candidate	Votes	%	±%
Cook Islands	Teariki Heather	204	54.0	+4.0
Democratic	Keu Mataroa	174	46.0	−4.0
Turnout		378		
