= Tumu Enua =

Political party in the Cook Islands

The Tumu Enua was a political party located in the Cook Islands. It was led by Norman George, a former member of the Democratic Party who had previously founded the breakaway New Alliance Party. The New Alliance Party eventually reunited with the Democrats, but George himself contested the 2004 elections under the Tumu Enua banner. The party won only 2.4% of popular votes and no seats. Norman George later joined the Cook Islands Party, the main rival of the Democrats.

"Tumu Enua" can be roughly translated as "base/foundation of the land".
