= Ngai Tupa =

Cook Islands politician (1936–2021)

Ngaingatara Tupa (24 April 1936 – 1 March 2021) was a Cook Islands politician and member of the Cook Islands Parliament. She was a member of the Cook Islands Democratic Party and the mother of MP Vaitoti Tupa.

Tupa was born in Rarotonga and educated at St. Joseph Catholic Primary School. She worked as a teacher and in retail, and served as the president of the Cook Islands Child Welfare Association and patron of the Girl Guides Cook Islands Association. She was elected to Parliament in the seat of Takuvaine-Tutakimoa in the 2006 snap election, defeating Cook Islands Party candidate Mark Brown. She served one term as a backbench MP, but was not re-elected in the 2010 election.

In July 2009 a report from the audit office found that Tupa had exerted undue influence over the reappointment of her son Vaitoti Tupa as director of the National Environment Services.
