= New Alliance Party (Cook Islands) =

The New Alliance Party was a political party in the Cook Islands. The party was led by Norman George, and was a continuation of his Alliance Party.

The Alliance had merged with the Democratic Party to form the Democratic Alliance after the 1994 elections, but a struggle over the leadership between George and Terepai Maoate saw George split off again in 1997, accompanied by Jim Marurai.

The party won 4 seats at the 1999 election, and formed a brief coalition with the Cook Islands Party which saw George serve as Deputy Prime Minister. A coalition realignment in November 1999 saw the NAP support Democratic party leader Terepai Maoate as Prime Minister, and the party remained in coalition despite George's subsequent sacking from Cabinet.

The NAP re-merged with the Democratic Alliance in 2002.
