= Cook Islands Labor Party =

Political party in the Cook Islands

The Cook Islands Labor Party was a political party in the Cook Islands. It was formed just before the 1965 election and ran seven candidates on Rarotonga, winning 5% of the vote. None of its candidates were successful, and the party quickly faded from view.
