= Minister of Foreign Affairs (Cook Islands) =

This is a list of foreign ministers of the Cook Islands.

- 1984–1989: Norman George
- 1989–1999: Inatio Akaruru
- 1999: Joe Williams
- 1999–2004: Robert Woonton
- 2004–2005: Tom Marsters
- 2005–2009: Wilkie Rasmussen
- 2009: Jim Marurai
- 2009: Sir Terepai Maoate
- 2009–2010: Jim Marurai
- 2010: Robert Wigmore
- 2010–2013: Tom Marsters
- 2013–2020: Henry Puna
- 2020–2024: Mark Brown
- 2024–present: Tingika Elikana

== Sources ==
- Rulers.org – Foreign ministers A–D
