= Apii Piho =

Minister of Justice
- In office 6 January 2010 – 17 November 2010
- Prime Minister: Jim Marurai
- Preceded by: Kete Ioane
- Succeeded by: Henry Puna

Minister of Health
- In office 6 January 2010 – 17 November 2010
- Preceded by: Kete Ioane
- Succeeded by: Nandi Glassie

Minister of Internal Affairs
- In office 6 January 2010 – 17 November 2010
- Preceded by: Ngamau Munokoa
- Succeeded by: Mark Brown

Member of the Cook Islands Parliament for Manihiki
- In office 27 September 2006 – 17 November 2010
- Preceded by: Henry Puna
- Succeeded by: Henry Puna

Personal details
- Born: 25 August 1960 (age 65) Rakahanga
- Party: Cook Islands Democratic Party

Tereapii (Apii) Piho (born 25 August 1960) is a Cook Islands politician and former Cabinet Minister.

Piho was born on Rakahanga and educated in New Zealand. He was first elected to Parliament for the seat of Manihiki as a member of the Cook Islands Democratic Party at the 2006 election, defeating Cook Islands Party leader Henry Puna.

In December 2009 he was appointed to Cabinet following the sacking of Terepai Maoate and resignation of Democratic party cabinet ministers. holding the portfolios of Justice, Health, Internal Affairs, Youth & Sports, and NGOs. As a result, he was expelled from the Democratic Party on 8 April 2010.

Piho failed to win re-election in the 2010 election and was defeated by Henry Puna.
