= Graham Speight =

New Zealand judge (1921–2008)

Sir Graham Speight

Queen’s Representative to the Cook Islands
- Acting
- In office 18 September 1984 – 19 December 1984
- Monarch: Elizabeth II
- Prime Minister: Tom Davis
- Preceded by: Gaven Donne
- Succeeded by: Tangaroa Tangaroa

Personal details
- Born: Graham Davies Speight; 21 July 1921 Auckland, New Zealand
- Died: 17 July 2008 (aged 86) Auckland, New Zealand
- Spouse: Elizabeth Muriel Booth (m. 1947)
- Children: 2
- Education: Auckland University College

Sir Graham Davies Speight (21 July 1921 – 17 July 2008) was a New Zealand High Court judge. He served as the acting Queen's Representative in the Cook Islands in 1984.

Speight was born in Auckland on 21 July 1921. He was educated at Newmarket School, Auckland Grammar School and Auckland University College, where he earned his law degree in 1942. After graduating, he served in the New Zealand Army from 1942 until 1946. He married Elizabeth Muriel Booth in 1947, and the couple went on to have two children.

Speight served as the Crown solicitor in Auckland from 1959 until 1966, when was appointed a High Court judge. He later served as the Chief Justice of the Cook Islands and the President of the Court of Appeal of Fiji from 1982 until 1988.

In 1976 the Auckland Star quoted Justice Graham Speight as saying, in relation to the immigration of Pacific Islanders to New Zealand, ‘one must have the gravest anxiety as to the placement of these unsophisticated people in an environment which they are totally unfitted to cope with.’ Which has now come to be seen as perpetuating anti-Pacific Islander racism and xenophobia during the period of the dawn raids.

In the 1983 New Year Honours, Speight was appointed a Knight Bachelor, in recognition of his service as a High Court judge.

Speight died in Auckland on 17 July 2008, at the age of 86. He was survived by his wife, son and five grandchildren.
