= William (Smiley) Heather =

Cook Islands politician

Minister of Transport
- In office 26 December 2009 – 2 December 2010
- Prime Minister: Jim Marurai
- Preceded by: Tangata Vavia
- Succeeded by: Tom Marsters

Minister for Infrastructure and Planning
- In office 26 December 2009 – 2 December 2010
- Preceded by: Tangata Vavia
- Succeeded by: Teariki Heather

Member of the Cook Islands Parliament for Ruaau
- In office 27 September 2006 – 1 August 2022
- Preceded by: Vaine Wichman
- Succeeded by: Timi Varu

Personal details
- Born: 7 July 1958 (age 68) Rarotonga
- Party: Cook Islands Democratic Party

William Kati (Smiley) Heather (born 7 July 1958) is a Cook Islands politician and former Cabinet Minister. He represented the seat of Ruaau in the Cook Islands Parliament from 2006 to 2022 and is Deputy Leader of the Cook Islands Democratic Party. He is the older brother of Cook Islands Party MP Teariki Heather.

Heather was born in Rarotonga and educated at Arorangi Primary School and Tereora College in the Cook Islands and Onslow College in Wellington, New Zealand. From 1980 to 1997, Heather played for the Cook Islands national rugby union team. He worked as a public servant in the Cook Islands Ministry of Works, Energy and Physical Planning (MOWEPP) from 1992, and, in 1997, became Director of Road Works. He was elected to Parliament as a member of the Democratic Party in the 2006 snap election. Following the election, he was appointed Democratic Party whip.

In December 2009, he was appointed to Cabinet as Minister for Transport, Infrastructure & Planning, and Energy following the sacking of Terepai Maoate and resignation of Democratic party cabinet ministers. As a result, he was expelled from the Democratic Party on 8 April 2010.

He was re-elected at the 2010 election as a Democratic candidate. In August 2012, he was elected Deputy Leader of the Democratic party. He was re-elected in the 2014 election, and in April 2015 was elected leader of the Democratic Party. In June 2017 he became leader of the opposition again.

Heather was re-elected at the 2018 election. In February 2020, he was appointed Democratic Party spokesperson for Corrective Services, Infrastructure and the Public Service Commission. In March 2021, he was appointed deputy leader, replacing Terepai Maoate Jnr.

He lost his seat in the 2022 Cook Islands general election. Heather again stood unsuccessfully in Ruaau in the 2026 general election.
