= 2006 Cook Islands general election =

- 27 September 2006
- All 24 seats in Parliament; 13 seats needed for a majority
Party	Leader	Vote %	Seats	+/–
Democratic	Terepai Maoate	52.02	14	0
Cook Islands	Henry Puna	45.26	7	−2
Independents	–	2.72	2	+1
This lists parties that won seats. See the complete results below.
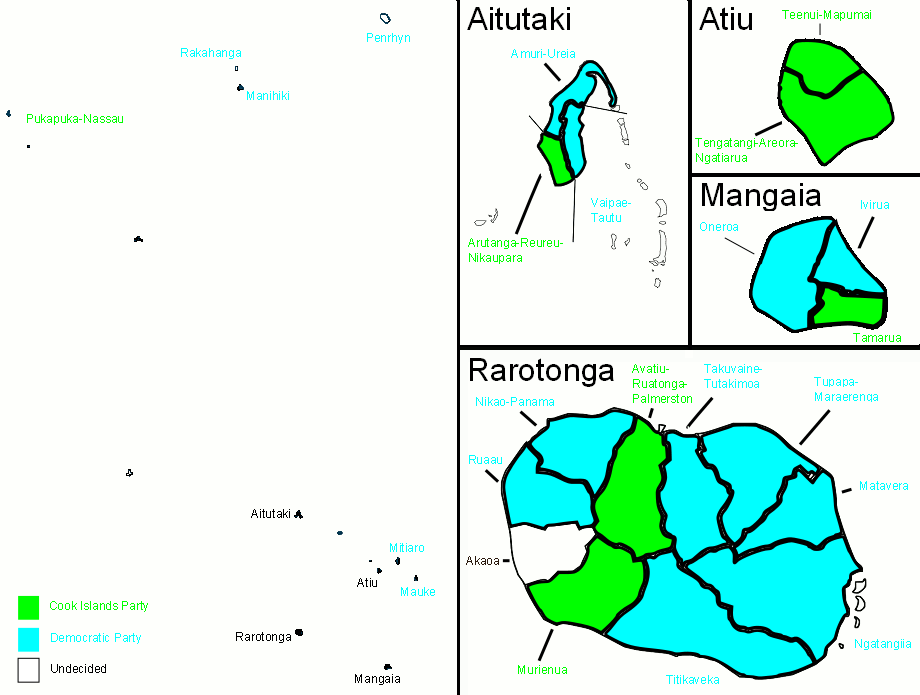
Results by constituency
Prime Minister before	Prime Minister after
Jim Marurai; Democratic	Jim Marurai; Democratic

General elections were held in the Cook Islands on 27 September 2006 in order to elect 24 MPs to the Cook Islands Parliament. The Democratic Party remained in power, winning 15 of 24 seats. A total of 8,497 voters turned out to vote.

The election was called two years early after the ruling Democratic party lost its majority in Parliament. In July 2006, Environment Minister Teina Bishop resigned from Cabinet and joined the opposition Cook Islands Party. Shortly afterwards, the Cook Islands Party won a by-election in Matevera, eliminating the government's majority. The government pre-empted a formal vote of no-confidence by dissolving Parliament and calling an election.

Cook Islands Party leader Sir Geoffrey Henry announced his retirement during the campaign, resulting in his replacement as leader of the opposition by Tom Marsters. Cook Islands Party MP Wilkie Rasmussen switched his allegiance to the Democratic Party during the campaign, and the CIP was unable to nominate a replacement candidate. As a result, the seat of Penrhyn was unopposed.

Initial results showed the Democratic Party winning 15 seats, and the Cook Islands Party 8, with one seat being held by an independent and one seat tied. A number of electoral petitions were filed, resulting in by-elections being held in the seats of Akaoa and Titikaveka.

== Results ==
The electorate of Akaoa was tied, resulting in a by-election.

Party	Votes	%	Seats	+/–
Democratic Party	4,420	52.02	14	0
Cook Islands Party	3,846	45.26	7	–2
Independents	231	2.72	2	+1
Vacant			1	–
Total	8,497	100.00	24	0
Registered voters/turnout	9,772	–		
Source: Final results, IFES

=== By electorate ===
Akaoa
Party	Candidate	Votes	%	±%
Cook Islands	Teariki Heather	179	50.0	
Democratic	Keu Mataroa	179	50.0	
Turnout		358	85.2	

Amuri-Ureia
Party	Candidate	Votes	%	±%
Democratic	Terepai Maoate Jnr	214	56.6	
Cook Islands	John Baxter	164	43.4	
Turnout		378	88.1	

Arutanga-Reureu-Nikaupara
Party	Candidate	Votes	%	±%
Cook Islands	Teina Bishop	179	53.1	
Democratic	Ronald Henry	158	46.9	
Turnout		337	80.4	

Avatiu-Ruatonga-Palmerston
Party	Candidate	Votes	%	±%
Cook Islands	Albert (Peto) Nicholas	295	50.9	
Democratic	Sam Crocombe	284	49.1	
Turnout		579	76.8	

Ivirua
Party	Candidate	Votes	%	±%
Democratic	Jim Marurai	82	83.7	
Cook Islands	Maara Peraua	16	16.3	
Turnout		98	98.0	

Manihiki
Party	Candidate	Votes	%	±%
Democratic	Apii Piho	115	51.1	
Cook Islands	Henry Puna	110	48.9	
Turnout		225	100.0	

Matavera
Party	Candidate	Votes	%	±%
Democratic	Cassey Eggelton	279	51.2	
Cook Islands	Kiriau Turepu	266	48.8	
Turnout		545	94.8	

Mauke
Party	Candidate	Votes	%	±%
Democratic	Mapu Taia	115	53.2	
Cook Islands	George Cowan	101	46.8	
Turnout		216	93.9	

Mitiaro
Party	Candidate	Votes	%	±%
Democratic	Tangata Vavia	65	58.0	
Cook Islands	Travel Tou Ariki	47	42.0	
Turnout		112	94.1	

Murienua
Party	Candidate	Votes	%	±%
Cook Islands	Tom Marsters	185	45.1	
Independent	Brett Porter	130	31.7	
Democratic	Poko Tuariki	95	23.2	
Turnout		410	88.6	

Ngatangiia
Party	Candidate	Votes	%	±%
Democratic	Terepai Maoate	295	62.1	
Cook Islands	Willie Kauvai	180	37.9	
Turnout		475	89.0	

Nikao-Panama
Party	Candidate	Votes	%	±%
Democratic	Ngamau Munokoa	398	57.6	
Cook Islands	Tangee Tangi Kokaua	293	42.4	
Turnout		691	85.2	

Oneroa
Party	Candidate	Votes	%	±%
Democratic	Winton Pickering	152	67.0	
Cook Islands	Papa Metu Ruatoe	75	33.0	
Turnout		227	96.6	

Penrhyn
Party	Candidate	Votes	%	±%
Democratic	Wilkie Rasmussen	Unopposed		

Pukapuka-Nassau
Party	Candidate	Votes	%	±%
Cook Islands	Vai Peua	155	55.0	
Democratic	Tiaki Wuatai	127	45.0	
Turnout		282	96.6	

Rakahanga
Party	Candidate	Votes	%	±%
Independent	Piho Rua	42	60.0	
Democratic	David Alepha Greig	28	40.0	
Turnout		70	94.6	

Ruaau
Party	Candidate	Votes	%	±%
Democratic	William (Smiley) Heather	364	56.6	
Cook Islands	Vaine Iriano Wichman	279	43.4	
Turnout		643	89.9	

Takuvaine-Tutakimoa
Party	Candidate	Votes	%	±%
Democratic	Ngai Tupa	325	56.0	
Cook Islands	Mark Brown	255	44.0	
Turnout		580	81.7	

Tamarua
Party	Candidate	Votes	%	±%
Cook Islands	Mii Parima	38	61.3	
Democratic	Andy Matapo	24	38.7	
Turnout		62	95.4	

Teenui-Mapumai
Party	Candidate	Votes	%	±%
Cook Islands	Norman George	85	63.0	
Democratic	Nellie Mokoroa	50	37.0	
Turnout		135	92.5	

Tengatangi-Areora-Ngatiarua
Party	Candidate	Votes	%	±%
Cook Islands	Nandi Glassie	104	58.8	
Democratic	Eugene Tatuava	73	41.2	
Turnout		177	97.3	

Titikaveka
Party	Candidate	Votes	%	±%
Democratic	Robert Wigmore	325	50.4	
Cook Islands	Tiki Matapo	276	42.8	
Independent	Tere Carr	44	6.8	
Turnout		645	87.9	

Tupapa-Maraerenga
Party	Candidate	Votes	%	±%
Democratic	John Tangi	461	53.9	
Cook Islands	Tupou Faireka	394	46.1	
Turnout		855	87.6	

Vaipae-Tautu
Party	Candidate	Votes	%	±%
Democratic	Kete Ioane	212	53.4	
Cook Islands	George Pitt	170	42.8	
Independent	Ngariki Bob	15	3.8	
Turnout		397	84.3	
