= Teina Bishop =

Cook Islands politician

Minister of Education
- In office 16 January 2014 – 17 April 2014
- Prime Minister: Henry Puna
- Succeeded by: Mona Ioane
- In office 3 December 2010 – 5 August 2013
- Preceded by: Jim Marurai
- In office 10 November 1999 – 18 November 1999
- Prime Minister: Joe Williams
- Succeeded by: Jim Marurai

Minister of Tourism
- In office 16 January 2014 – 17 April 2014
- Prime Minister: Henry Puna
- Succeeded by: Mona Ioane
- In office 3 December 2010 – 5 August 2013
- Preceded by: Robert Wigmore

Minister of Marine Resources
- In office 3 December 2010 – 5 August 2013
- Preceded by: Robert Wigmore
- Succeeded by: Henry Puna

Minister for Outer Islands Development
- In office 2006 – 21 July 2006
- Prime Minister: Jim Marurai
- Preceded by: Jim Marurai

Minister for the Environment
- In office 2006 – 21 July 2006
- Preceded by: Wilkie Rasmussen

Deputy Speaker of the Parliament of the Cook Islands
- In office 2004–2005

Member of the Cook Islands Parliament for Arutanga–Reureu–Nikaupara
- In office 16 June 1999 – 21 July 2016
- Preceded by: Ngereteina Puna
- Succeeded by: Pumati Israela

Personal details
- Born: 11 April 1959 (age 67) Aitutaki, Cook Islands
- Party: Cook Islands Party; Independent; One Cook Islands Movement
- Education: University of the South Pacific

Teina Bishop (born 11 April 1959) is a Cook Islands politician, former Cabinet Minister, and leader of the One Cook Islands Movement. He was jailed for corruption in 2016.

Bishop was born in Aitutaki and was educated at Araura Primary school, Aitutaki Junior High School, and the University of the South Pacific before working as a teacher.

== Political career ==
Bishop was first elected to the Parliament as a Cook Islands Party candidate in the 1999 election. He briefly served as Minister of Education in the Cabinet of Joe Williams before losing the position when Williams lost a confidence vote to Terepai Maoate. while in opposition he opposed plans to build a casino in the Cook Islands.

In 2003 he resigned from Parliament over budget cuts to his constituency, precipitating a by-election in which he stood as an independent and was returned unopposed. He was re-elected in the 2004 election, and elected Deputy Speaker, a position he held until 2005. In 2006 he was appointed as Minister for the Environment and Outer Islands in the cabinet of Jim Marurai, but resigned in July and rejoined the Cook Islands Party, precipitating the 2006 snap election. Bishop was re-elected, and spent the next four years in opposition.

== Cabinet and downfall ==
The Cook Islands party won the 2010 election and Bishop was appointed to Cabinet as Minister of Education, Tourism, and Marine Resources. In May 2011 he increased the number of exploratory fishing licenses available and redirected licensing revenues to boost domestic fishing.

In August 2013 Bishop was stood down from Cabinet following allegations of corruption and fraud in his handling of the marine resources portfolio. He was alleged to have mingled his personal business with his ministerial responsibilities in a complicated business arrangement to sell a fishing license to a Chinese company. He was reinstated to the Education and Tourism portfolios in January 2014. He resigned again in April 2014, the day after the 2014 election was called, after a dispute over whether to dissolve Parliament. He subsequently established the One Cook Islands Movement to contest the elections, and was re-elected. In June 2015 he officially formed an alliance with the Democratic Party. The coalition was dissolved in December after a court ruled that Bishop should stand trial, but in March 2016 he was elected leader of the opposition.

On 21 July 2016 Bishop was found guilty of corruption over his granting of fisheries licences while a Minister. He was removed from his seat, sparking the 2016 Arutanga-Reureu-Nikaupara by-election. Bishop served a six-month term of imprisonment and was released in June 2017. He did not contest the 2018 election, but remained as One Cook Islands leader.
