= Prime Minister of the Cook Islands =

Head of government

- Minitia Ma‘ata o te Kūki ‘Airani (Cook Islands Māori); Paraimi Minita o te Kūki Airani (Penrhyn)
- Coat of arms of the Cook Islands

- Flag of the Cook Islands

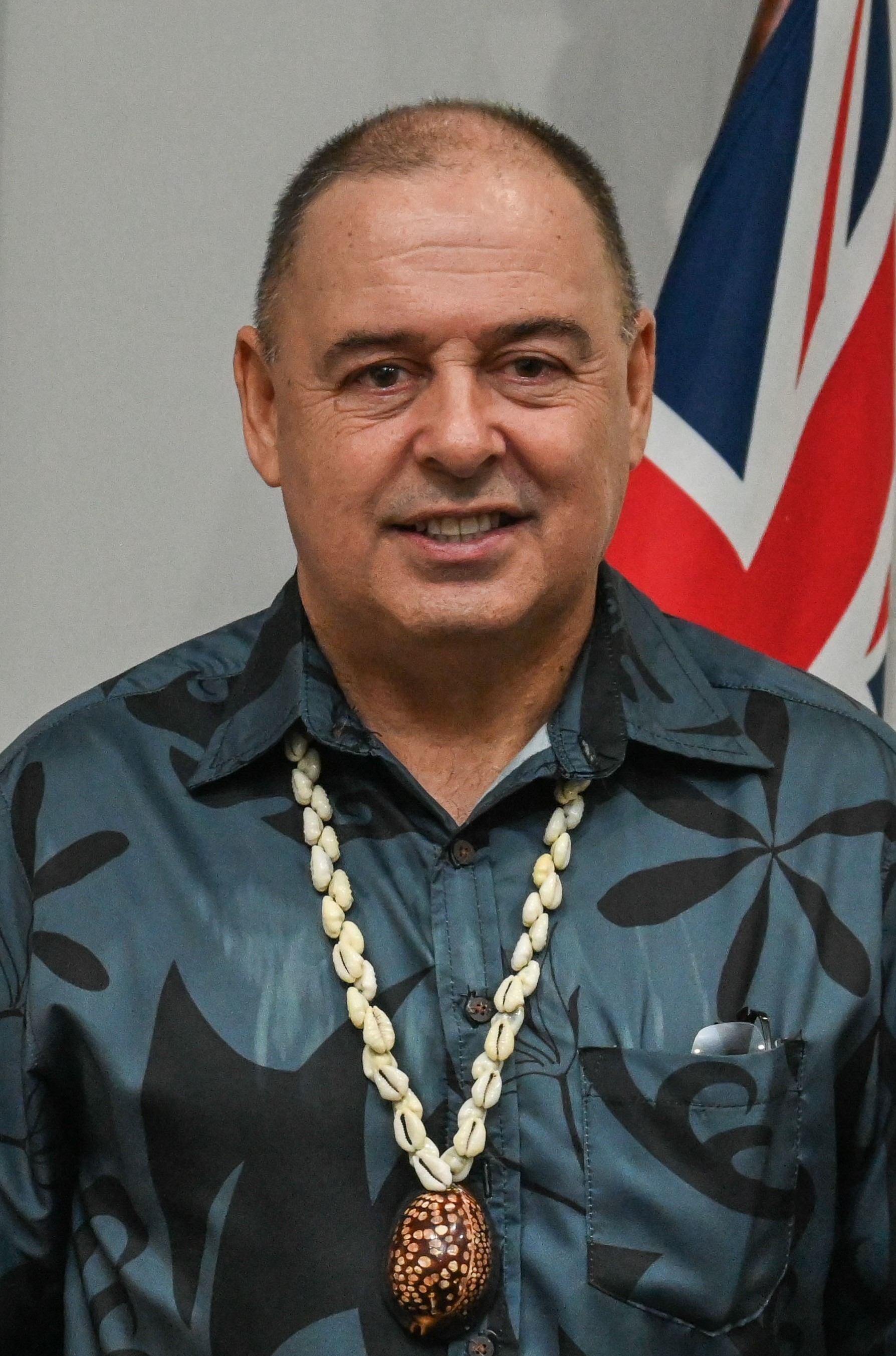
- Incumbent; Mark Brown since 1 October 2020
- Type: Head of government
- Abbreviation: PM
- Member of: Cabinet; Parliament
- Seat: Avarua
- Appointer: King's Representative
- Term length: At His Majesty's pleasure
- Constituting instrument: Constitution of the Cook Islands
- Precursor: Leader of Government Business
- Formation: 4 August 1965
- First holder: Albert Henry (as Premier)
- Deputy: Deputy Prime Minister of the Cook Islands
- Website: www.pmoffice.gov.ck

The prime minister of the Cook Islands is the head of government of the Cook Islands, a self-governing territory in free association with New Zealand. The office was established in 1965, when self-government was first granted to the islands. Originally, the title "Premier" was used, but this was replaced by the title of "Prime Minister" in 1981.

== List of officeholders ==
Key

Cook Islands Democratic

No.	Portrait	Name (Birth–Death)	Term of office			Political party	Elected	Ref.
No.	Portrait	Name (Birth–Death)	Took office	Left office	Time in office	Political party	Elected	Ref.
1		Albert Henry (1907–1981)	4 August 1965	25 July 1978	12 years, 355 days	Cook Islands Party	1965; 1968; 1972; 1974	
2		Thomas Davis (1917–2007)	25 July 1978	13 April 1983	4 years, 262 days	Democratic Party	1978	
3		Geoffrey Henry (1940–2012)	13 April 1983	16 November 1983	217 days	Cook Islands Party	1983 (Mar.)	
(2)		Thomas Davis (1917–2007)	16 November 1983	29 July 1987	3 years, 255 days	Democratic Party	1983 (Nov.)	
4		Pupuke Robati (1925–2009)	29 July 1987	1 February 1989	1 year, 187 days	Democratic Party	–	
(3)		Geoffrey Henry (1940–2012)	1 February 1989	29 July 1999	10 years, 178 days	Cook Islands Party	1989; 1994; 1999	
5		Joe Williams (1934–2020)	29 July 1999	18 November 1999	112 days	Cook Islands Party	–	
6		Terepai Maoate (1934–2012)	18 November 1999	11 February 2002	2 years, 85 days	Democratic Alliance Party	–	
7		Robert Woonton (born 1949)	11 February 2002	11 December 2004	2 years, 304 days	Democratic Alliance Party	2004	
8		Jim Marurai (1947–2020)	14 December 2004	29 November 2010	5 years, 350 days	Democratic Alliance Party (2004–05)	–	
8		Jim Marurai (1947–2020)	14 December 2004	29 November 2010	5 years, 350 days	Cook Islands First Party (2005–06)	–	
8		Jim Marurai (1947–2020)	14 December 2004	29 November 2010	5 years, 350 days	Democratic Party (2006–2010)	2006	
9		Henry Puna (born 1949)	30 November 2010	1 October 2020	9 years, 306 days	Cook Islands Party	2010; 2014; 2018	
10		Mark Brown (born 1963)	1 October 2020	Incumbent	6 years, 14 days	Cook Islands Party	2022; 2026	

== See also ==
- Politics of the Cook Islands
- Monarchy in the Cook Islands
  - King's Representative
