= Piho Rua =

Cook Islands politician

Piho Rua (born 15 November 1954) is a Cook Islands politician and former member of the Cook Islands Parliament.

Rua was born on Rakahanga and educated at Aitutaki Junior High School and Tereora College. He had a twenty-year career as a police officer before becoming a public servant and serving as Chief Executive of the Prime Minister's Office. While serving in that role, Rua advocated for tight control of the media to prevent stories critical of the government. He also attracted controversy after being promoted to the rank of police superintendent, despite having left the police force.

He was first elected to Parliament at the 2004 election, winning the seat of Rakahanga from Speaker of the House and former Prime Minister Pupuke Robati. The election was later subject to an unsuccessful electoral petition. During the post-election period he was courted by Prime Minister Robert Woonton, but declined to join his new party. When Woonton resigned his seat, he supported Jim Marurai as Prime Minister, and was appointed to Cabinet as Minister of Culture, Tourism, and the Public Service Commission.

Rua was forced to resign from Cabinet in May 2005 after concerns over his handling of his ministries. A subsequent audit of ministerial expenses revealed that Rua had spent $US4,500 on personal phone calls in just six months in office; he agreed to repay the money.

In December 2005, Rua was accused of selling unauthorized DVDs of Peter jackson's King Kong through his retail store.

In 2006, Rua aligned himself with the opposition Cook Islands Party in an unsuccessful attempt to overthrow the governing coalition in a confidence vote.

In September 2010 Rua announced that he was retiring from politics and would not contest the 2010 election.
