= 1994 Cook Islands general election =

- 24 March 1994
- All 25 seats in Parliament; 13 seats needed for a majority
Party	Leader	Vote %	Seats	+/–
Cook Islands	Geoffrey Henry	51.4	20	+8
Alliance Party	Norman George	23.7	2	New
Democratic	Terepai Maoate	19.6	3	−6
This lists parties that won seats. See the complete results below.
Prime Minister before	Prime Minister after
Geoffrey Henry; CIP	Geoffrey Henry; CIP

General elections were held in the Cook Islands on 24 March 1994 to elect 25 MPs to the Parliament. The election was a landslide victory for the Cook Islands Party, which won 20 seats. The Democratic Party won three seats, and the newly established Alliance Party two.

The election was held at the same time as five referendums on the country's name, flag, national anthem, the length of its parliamentary term, and the future of its overseas electorate.

== Background ==
In the 1989 election the Cook Islands Party had won 12 seats, and formed a government after Democratic Tumu leader Vincent Ingram agreed to informally support it and abstain on legislation rather than oppose it. Subsequent by-elections and changes of allegiance brought its number of MPs to 17. Meanwhile the opposition had changed its leadership several times, with Pupuke Robati replaced first by Terepai Maoate, and then at the last minute by former prime minister Tom Davis. Norman George split from the Democratic Party to establish the Alliance.

The CIP government had turned the islands into a tax haven, resulting in inquiries and court cases in Australia, New Zealand, Hong Kong, and the United States. This and the issue of government debt from the failed Sheraton hotel project formed the backdrop of the campaign.

== Campaign ==
During the campaign the Alliance released a pamphlet of documents on the Sheraton hotel project, resulting in threats of legal action. The Democratic party did very little campaigning.

The campaign was the first in the Cook Islands to involve television.

== Results ==
Party	Votes	%	Seats	+/–
Cook Islands Party		51.4	20	+8
Alliance Party		23.7	2	New
Democratic Party		19.6	3	–6
Independents		5.3	0	–1
Total			25	+1
Registered voters/turnout		92.0		
Source: Nohlen et al.
