= Robert Woonton =

9th Prime Minister of the Cook Islands

9th Prime Minister of the Cook Islands
- In office 11 February 2002 – 11 December 2004
- Monarch: Elizabeth II
- Queen's Representative: Laurence Greig (Acting); Sir Frederick Tutu Goodwin
- Deputy: Geoffrey Henry; Terepai Maoate; Ngamau Munokoa
- Preceded by: Terepai Maoate
- Succeeded by: Jim Marurai

Deputy Prime Minister of the Cook Islands
- In office 30 July 2001 – 11 February 2002
- Prime Minister: Terepai Maoate
- Preceded by: Norman George
- Succeeded by: Geoffrey Henry

Minister of Foreign Affairs
- In office 1 December 1999 – 11 December 2004
- Prime Minister: Terepai Maoate; Himself
- Preceded by: Joe Williams
- Succeeded by: Robert Wigmore

Minister of Transport
- In office 1 December 1999 – 20 February 2001
- Prime Minister: Terepai Maoate
- Preceded by: Joe Williams
- Succeeded by: Terepai Maoate

Member of the Cook Islands Parliament for Manihiki
- In office 24 March 1994 – 7 September 2004
- Preceded by: Ben Toma
- Succeeded by: Henry Puna

Personal details
- Born: 1949 (age 76–77)
- Party: Democratic Party; Cook Islands First Party
- Spouse: Sue Woonton

Robert Woonton (born 1949) is a Cook Islands politician and diplomat. He served as Prime Minister of the Cook Islands from 11 February 2002 until 11 December 2004, and later as High Commissioner to New Zealand. He was a member of the centrist Democratic Party.

Woonton trained as a medical doctor. He was first elected to the Cook Islands Parliament at the 1994 election. He was re-elected at the 1999 election. Following the premiership of Joe Williams, he was appointed to the Cabinet of Terepai Maoate as Minister of Foreign Affairs and Minister of Transport. In February 2001 he was removed as Transport Minister, but retained his Foreign Affairs portfolio. In July 2001, following the sacking of Norman George, he was appointed Deputy Prime Minister.

== Prime minister ==
In February 2002 Woonton resigned his portfolios and tabled a motion of no confidence against Maoate. The motion failed, and Woonton returned to the government. Three days later, Maoate resigned after losing a second confidence vote, and Woonton became prime minister.

Woonton's premiership was beset by chaos and allegations of corruption. In May 2002, shortly after taking office, he was cleared of bribery allegations over claims he had approved the use of public money to fly an independent MP and his wife to New Zealand so she could receive medical treatment. In September 2002 he threatened to deport the publisher of the Cook Islands Independent after it published a story alleging he had used public money to purchase furniture for his private residence. In November 2002 he sacked Justice Minister Norman George, formed a new coalition with both the Democratic Party and Cook Islands Party, and promised early elections. A few months later in January 2003 he sacked Deputy Prime Minister Geoffrey Henry, replacing him with Democratic leader Terepai Maoate. In November 2003 Maoate in turn resigned after he tabled a motion of no confidence in the government. Later that month Woonton was officially elected leader of the Democratic Party, replacing Maoate. He was replaced again by Maoate in May 2004.

In December 2003 Woonton's government faced allegations that it was selling residency, after it granted residency to convicted New Zealand businessman Mark Lyon in exchange for a $150,000 bond. Lyon was later banned from the Cook Islands, and Woonton attempted to sue those critical of the decision to allow him in for defamation. In May 2004 he made a state visit to China, in which he accepted US$2.5 million in aid in exchange for recognising that Taiwan was part of China. When the Cook Islands Herald published a satirical letter questioning this change in policy, Woonton attempted to have them prosecuted for criminal libel. Shortly afterward he dissolved Parliament for the election.

At the 2004 election Woonton's government retained its majority, but Woonton was nearly defeated. While awaiting the result of electoral petitions, Woonton announced a new coalition with the Cook Islands Party. He was subsequently expelled from the Democratic Party and formed his own party, the Demo Party Tumu (later known as Cook Islands First). On 12 December 2004 a recount found that the result in Woonton's electorate of Manihiki was a tie. Woonton resigned as prime minister, and was replaced by Jim Marurai. He did not contest the resulting 2005 Manihiki by-election.

Following the election, the Cook Islands Court of Appeal ruled that Woonton's Cabinet had bribed voters in the electorate of Titikaveka in an effort to secure the election of Cabinet Minister Robert Wigmore.

== Post-political career ==
In early 2005 Woonton was appointed High Commissioner to New Zealand, replacing Tom Davis. He was sacked in March 2006, following accusations that he was plotting with members of parliament to end Marurai's government. Shortly after being sacked he joined a Wellington-based development firm which planned to build a new private hospital on Rarotonga.

He now works as a doctor in Auckland. In 2011 he was appointed to the Auckland Council's inaugural Pacific People's Advisory Panel.
