= Mapu Taia =

Cook Islands politician

Mapu Taia OBE

Speaker of the Cook Islands Parliament
- In office 2006–2010
- Preceded by: Norman George
- Succeeded by: Geoffrey Henry

Deputy Speaker of the Parliament of the Cook Islands
- In office 1999–2005

Member of the Cook Islands Parliament for Mauke
- In office 16 June 1999 – 17 November 2010
- Preceded by: Vaine Tairea
- Succeeded by: Tai Tura

Personal details
- Born: 28 April 1939
- Died: October 2015 (aged 76)
- Party: Cook Islands Democratic Party

Mapu Tangatatutai Taia OBE (28 April 1939 - October 2015) was a Cook Islands politician. He served as Speaker of the Cook Islands Parliament from 2006 to 2010. He was a member of the Cook Islands Democratic Party and held the traditional title of Kakemaunga Mataiapo.

Taia was born in Mauke in the Cook Islands and educated at Mauke Primary School, Avarua School, Nikao Maori School and Tereora College. He completed a teaching diploma at Nikao Teachers Training College in 1958, and later studied at the University of the South Pacific. He worked as a primary school teacher, then as a principal of Mitiaro School (1963–1971) and Mauke College (1972–1996). While a school principal he also became an oral historian. He retired after 40 years of teaching in 1996, and became a Justice of the Peace.

Taia was elected to the Cook Islands Parliament as MP for Mauke in the 1999 election. He was appointed Deputy Speaker in 1999. In 2004 he was the Democrats' candidate for Speaker, but lost to Norman George. He was appointed Speaker in 2006, and served in that role until he retired at the 2010 election.

Taia was awarded an OBE for community and public sector services in 2008. He died in October 2015 and is buried on Mauke.
