= John Tangi =

Cook Islands politician

John David Tangi (13 November 1950 – 1 August 2018) was a Cook Islands politician, MP, and Clerk of the Cook Islands Parliament. He was a member of the Democratic Party.

Tangi was born in Alofi, Niue. He was educated at Nikao and Avarua primary schools, Tereora College and Niue Island High School before attending the University of the South Pacific in Suva, Fiji, and the University of Hawaiʻi. He was first elected to Parliament as MP for Tupapa/Maraerenga in the 2006 election, and served as Leader of the House and Parliamentary Chaplain. In July 2010 Tangi failed to win re-selection as the Democratic Party candidate in his electorate. He subsequently ran as an independent in the 2010 elections, but failed to win re-election.

In September 2013 Tangi was appointed Clerk of Parliament. His tenure as clerk was controversial, and he was criticised for publicly criticising opposition MPs who had attempted to force a confidence vote.

Tangi was a Pastor in the Assembly of God church.
