= Geoffrey Henry =

Cook Island politician and prime minister

Sir Geoffrey Henry KBE
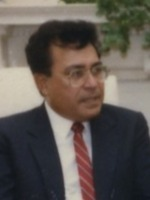
- Henry in 1990

9th Speaker of the Cook Islands Parliament
- In office 18 February 2011 – 9 May 2012
- Monarch: Elizabeth II
- Queen's Representative: Sir Frederick Tutu Goodwin
- Preceded by: Mapu Taia
- Succeeded by: Niki Rattle

5th Deputy Prime Minister of the Cook Islands
- In office 19 November 2004 – 9 August 2005
- Prime Minister: Robert Woonton; Jim Marurai
- Queen's Representative: Sir Frederick Tutu Goodwin
- Preceded by: Ngamau Munokoa
- Succeeded by: Sir Terepai Maoate
- In office 11 February 2002 – 30 January 2003
- Prime Minister: Robert Woonton
- Queen's Representative: Sir Frederick Tutu Goodwin
- Preceded by: Robert Woonton
- Succeeded by: Sir Terepai Maoate
- In office 16 November 1983 – 1985
- Prime Minister: Geoffrey Henry; Sir Tom Davis
- Queen's Representative: Sir Gaven Donne; Sir Graham Speight (Acting); Sir Tangaroa Tangaroa
- Preceded by: Sir Pupuke Robati
- Succeeded by: Terepai Maoate

3rd and 6th Prime Minister of the Cook Islands
- In office 1 February 1989 – 29 July 1999
- Monarch: Elizabeth II
- Deputy: Inatio Akaruru
- Queen's Representative: Sir Tangaroa Tangaroa; Sir Apenera Short
- Preceded by: Pupuke Robati
- Succeeded by: Joe Williams
- In office 13 April 1983 – 16 November 1983
- Monarch: Elizabeth II
- Deputy: Vacant
- Queen's Representative: Sir Gaven Donne
- Preceded by: Sir Tom Davis
- Succeeded by: Sir Tom Davis

Personal details
- Born: Geoffrey Arama Henry; 16 November 1940 Aitutaki, Cook Islands
- Died: 9 May 2012 (aged 71) Takuvaine, Rarotonga, Cook Islands
- Party: Cook Islands Party
- Spouse: Lady Louisa Henry
- Education: Victoria University of Wellington

Sir Geoffrey Arama Henry KBE (16 November 1940 – 9 May 2012) was a Cook Island politician who was twice the Prime Minister of the Cook Islands. He was leader of the Cook Islands Party (CIP) from 1979 to 2006.

== Early life ==
Henry was a native of Aitutaki. His father was the deacon of the Cook Islands Christian Church on the island. He was also first cousin to Albert Henry. He received a law degree from Victoria University of Wellington in New Zealand. He was married to Lady Louisa Henry.

== Political career ==
Henry initially entered parliament in the opposition party aged 24 because of the corruption and excesses of the governing Cook Islands Party led by his cousin Albert Henry. However, in 1972 he joined the CIP: "family pressure was unbearable, and he could not personally tolerate being ostracised by the family again". Despite distrust from Albert Henry's powerful wife Elizabeth, his talent in a mediocre party meant he became finance minister.

Henry became leader of the CIP in 1979 after his cousin Albert Henry was forced to resign. Geoffrey Henry's first tenure as Prime Minister was from 13 April 1983 to 16 November 1983. From 1983 to 1989 he was the Leader of the Opposition in the Parliament of the Cook Islands. Henry's second tenure as prime minister began on 1 February 1989 and ended on 29 July 1999, when he resigned rather than face the break-up of the CIP due to party dissidents who opposed his leadership. Joe Williams replaced Henry as prime minister, but Henry remained as leader of the CIP.

In November 2004, Henry became the Deputy Prime Minister and Minister of Finance in a coalition government led by Robert Woonton. Henry continued in this position until 2006, when he retired from politics and as leader of the CIP. Henry Puna succeeded Henry as leader of the CIP.

=== Honours and awards ===
In 1977, Henry was awarded the Queen Elizabeth II Silver Jubilee Medal. On 13 June 1992, while serving as prime minister, Henry was appointed a Knight Commander of the Order of the British Empire (KBE) by Queen Elizabeth II.

== Post-political career ==
On 16 April 2009, Henry was elected to a four-year term as president of the Cook Islands Sports and National Olympic Committee. The Sir Geoffrey Henry National Culture Centre in Avarua is named in Henry's honour.

On 18 February 2011 he was elected Speaker of the Cook Islands Parliament.

On 9 May 2012, Henry died at the age of 71 at his home in Takuvaine, Rarotonga. In the days preceding his death he had been receiving treatment for cancer.

== 2010 Air New Zealand "terrorist" incident ==
In August 2010, Henry was removed from an Air New Zealand aeroplane at the Auckland International Airport after Henry made a comment during boarding about being a terrorist. Henry was asked to leave the New Caledonia-bound aircraft, but was not arrested. Henry later stated that he had become angry when required by security procedures to remove his jacket a second time despite an injured shoulder; as he boarded, he joked to the flight attendant, "Somebody back there thinks I am a terrorist." Henry refused to apologise for the incident, stating that "I don’t even look like Osama bin Laden or one of his lieutenants." Henry blamed his removal from the flight on the Air New Zealand pilot, who refused to fly with Henry on board; Henry argued that the pilot overreacted and should have applied "a modicum of commonsense" to the situation.
