= Jim Marurai =

10th Prime Minister of the Cook Islands

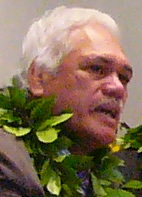

10th Prime Minister of the Cook Islands
- In office 14 December 2004 – 29 November 2010
- Monarch: Elizabeth II
- Queen's Representative: Frederick Tutu Goodwin
- Deputy: Geoffrey Henry; Terepai Maoate; Robert Wigmore
- Preceded by: Robert Woonton
- Succeeded by: Henry Puna

Minister of Education
- In office 29 June 1999 – 29 November 2010
- Prime Minister: Geoffrey Henry; Joe Williams; Terepai Maoate; Robert Woonton; Himself
- Succeeded by: Teina Bishop

Minister of Police
- In office 29 September 2005 – 29 November 2010
- Prime Minister: Himself
- Preceded by: Peri Vaevae Pare
- Succeeded by: Henry Puna

Minister of Foreign Affairs
- In office 2009 – 23 December 2009
- Preceded by: Terepai Maoate
- Succeeded by: Robert Wigmore
- In office 28 July 2009 – 2009
- Preceded by: Wilkie Rasmussen
- Succeeded by: Terepai Maoate

Member of the Cook Islands Parliament for Ivirua
- In office 1994 – 5 July 2017
- Succeeded by: Tony Armstrong

Personal details
- Born: 9 July 1947 Ivirua, Mangaia, Cook Islands
- Died: November 2020 (aged 73) Ivirua, Mangaia, Cook Islands
- Party: New Alliance Party; Cook Islands First Party; Democratic Party
- Spouse: Tuaine Marurai (deceased)
- Children: Jason Marurai, Anna Marurai, Eion Marurai, Tokoa Marurai, R Marurai
- Education: University of Otago

Jim Marurai (9 July 1947 – November 2020) was a Cook Islands politician who served as Prime Minister of the Cook Islands from 2004 to 2010. He was a member of the Democratic Party.

== Personal life ==
Marurai was born in Ivirua, Mangaia. He attended Ivirua and Oneroa Primary school and then Tereora College on Rarotonga and Napier Boys' High School in New Zealand. He later studied to be a teacher at the University of Otago in Dunedin, New Zealand.

Marurai's wife, Tuaine Marurai, died on 14 September 2005 in Auckland, New Zealand, at the age of 56 after suffering from cancer. She was buried on her home island of Mangaia.

In March 2020 Marurai went missing from his home but was found after two days. He died in the first week of November 2020 in his home in Ivirua.

== Political career ==
Marurai was first elected to Parliament in a by-election in 1994. He served as an opposition backbencher for his first term, and joined Norman George in splitting from the Democrats to form the New Alliance Party. Following the 1999 election he was appointed Minister of Education in the coalition Cabinets of Geoffrey Henry and Joe Williams. He retained the portfolio under both succeeding Prime Ministers, Terepai Maoate and Robert Woonton.

=== Prime minister ===
Marurai was re-elected at the 2004 election. When Prime Minister Robert Woonton was expelled from the Democratic party for forming a coalition with the Cook Islands Party, Marurai joined him in the newly formed Demo Party Tumu (later known as Cook Islands First). When an electoral petition found Woonton's seat was a dead tie, Woonton resigned, and Marurai was elected Prime Minister. Initially he governed in coalition with the Cook Islands Party as part of a power-sharing deal which would see CIP leader Geoffrey Henry become Prime Minister after two years, but in August 2005 the agreement broke down and Marurai formed a new coalition with the Democrats. Terepai Maoate became Deputy Prime Minister again, and a month later the remaining CIP Cabinet Ministers were sacked and replaced by Democrats.

In October 2005 Marurai suspended Police Minister Peri Vaevae Pare from Cabinet over an allegation of wrongful use of public funds; Pare was subsequently asked to resign after he was convicted in January 2006. In March 2006 two government MP's crossed the floor and sided with the opposition in an unsuccessful plot to bring down the government. The High Commissioner to New Zealand, former prime minister Rober Woonton, was sacked for his involvement in the plot. The resulting deadlock in Parliament was broken when Environment Minister Teina Bishop resigned and joined the opposition and the Cook Islands Party won the 2006 Matavera by-election. To avoid a confidence vote, Marurai dissolved Parliament and called a snap election.

The Democratic Party won the resulting 2006 election and agreed to back Marurai as Prime Minister again. Shortly after the election his government pushed a controversial Media Standards Bill to regulate the media. In May 2007 Marurai attended the 8th Pacific Islands Conference of Leaders in Washington, D.C., and expressed disappointment with the lack of commitments by the United States. In August 2007 he hosted New Zealand Governor-General Anand Satyanand, and in October he made a state visit to China.

Marurai's coalition came under strain in early 2008, with an outbreak of bickering and calls for Ministers to be sacked. In late 2008 Foreign Minister Wilkie Rasmussen publicly called for both Marurai and his deputy Maoate to step down. In July 2009 Rasmussen was sacked for plotting with the opposition. In December, a million dollar legal settlement from a failed bid to buy the Toa fuel tank farm led to the sacking of Maoate and a walkout of Democrats from Cabinet. Marurai was subsequently expelled from the Democratic Party. In January 2010, with both the Democrats and the Cook Islands Party opposed to his premiership, Marurai announced that he would not be "calling parliament for at least several months" as no sitting was required until it was necessary to pass a budget. He later announced that he had no intention of calling Parliament until September.

Marurai was readmitted to the Democratic party at a party conference in June 2010. He subsequently announced that he would not continue as Prime Minister if the Democratic Party won the 2010 election. Marurai was re-elected to his Ivirua seat in the 2010 elections, but his party was ousted. He resigned as Prime Minister on 29 November 2010, but continued to serve as a backbench MP.

Despite saying that the 2010 term would be his last, Marurai stood again for Ivirua in the 2014 election and was elected unopposed. He resigned for health reasons in 2017. The subsequent 2017 Ivirua by-election was won by Tony Armstrong.
