= Democratic Party (Cook Islands) =

Cook Islands Democratic Party
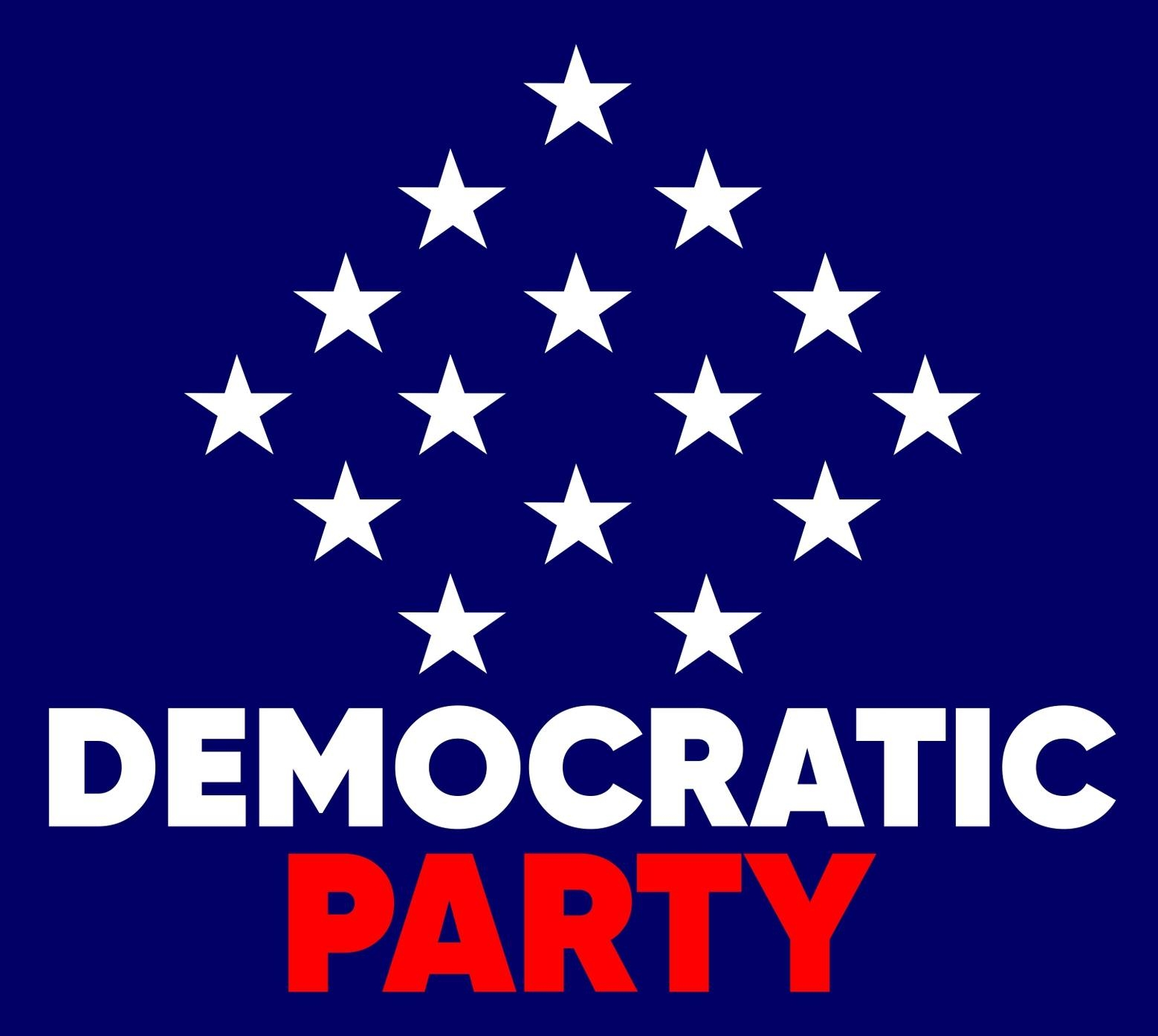
- Leader: Tina Browne
- President: Lee Harmon
- Secretary-General: Angeline Tuara
- Founder: Thomas Davis
- Founded: 1971
- Headquarters: Avarua, Rarotonga, Avatiu, Cook Islands
- Ideology: Social liberalism
- Political position: Centre to centre-left
- Seats in the Cook Islands Parliament: 0 / 24

Website
- Facebook page

The Democratic Party (also known for a time as the Democratic Alliance Party) is a political party in the Cook Islands. As a result of the 2026 Cook Islands election, it is currently in extra-parliamentary opposition, holding no seats in the Cook Islands Parliament.

== History ==
=== Early years ===
The Democratic Party was founded by Tom Davis in 1971, in opposition to the Cook Islands Party (CIP) of Albert Henry. In the 1972 election, it won eight seats, breaking the two-thirds majority of the CIP. In 1978, it won power, with Davis becoming Prime Minister. It became one of the two primary parties of the Cook Islands, alternating in power with the CIP. Davis served as prime minister of the Cook Islands from 1978 to 1987, with a brief interruption in 1983 when the Cook Islands briefly returned to power. The Democratic Party remained in power until 1989. In the late 1990s, the party experienced a split, with the majority of the party renamed as the Democratic Alliance Party. A breakaway faction led by Norman George was named the New Alliance Party. Despite this, the Democratic Party became the largest political party in the 1999 elections, winning 11 of 25 seats. The New Alliance Party, with 4 seats, made a coalition with the Cook Islands party to keep that party in power for several more months, but the coalition soon broke down, and the New Alliance Party formed a coalition party with the Democrats, allowing Democratic party leader Terepai Maoate to become prime minister. The Democratic Alliance Party and the New Alliance Party later reunited under the old Democratic Party name.

In 2002 Maoate was overthrown in a no confidence vote and replaced by his deputy Robert Woonton, also a member of the DAP. It formed a coalition with the Cook Islands Party which broke down in 2003.

=== 2004 and 2006 elections ===
At the next elections, 7 September 2004, the Democratic Alliance won 47.2% of popular votes and 12 out of 24 seats. Prime Minister Robert Woonton, though initially believed to have retained his seat, which would have allowed the Democratic Party to have a majority, was determined in a recount to have received an equal number of votes as his opponent, and he lost a revote. The new party leader, Jim Marurai, became prime minister. In 2005, however, Marurai left the party due to internal disputes, founding his own Cook Islands First Party. Marurai continued to govern with the help of the CIP. Later, however, the agreement with the CIP broke down, and Marurai allied himself with the Democrats again. He has since rejoined the party, continuing to serve as prime minister but not party leader. Terepai Maoate became deputy prime minister and party leader. At the 2006 elections, the Democratic Party gained a majority of seats, winning 15 of the 24 seats.

=== 2010 election campaign ===
Party logo from the 2010 election campaign

The party suffered from internal strife in the leadup to the 2010 election. In December 2009, Prime Minister Jim Marurai sacked his Deputy Prime Minister, Terepai Maoate, sparking a mass-resignation of Democratic Party cabinet members He and new Deputy Prime Minister Robert Wigmore were subsequently expelled from the Democratic Party, and the party withdrew its support. A formal split was averted in June 2010 when a party conference readmitted Marurai, Wigmore, and the other Cabinet members, and appointed Wigmore as party leader, with Wilkie Rasmussen as his deputy. However, several senior MPs, including former leader Terepai Maoate and former President John Tangi subsequently failed to win reselection and ran as independents.

The party launched its campaign on 7 October in vaka Takitumu with the campaign slogan "Our Future. Now." The party promised stability, benefit increases, and public service cuts. It contested every electorate except Arutanga-Nikaupara-Reureu. The party was unsuccessful in the elections, winning only 8 of 24 seats.

=== Since 2010 ===
After the death of Robert Wigmore from cancer in April 2012, Wilkie Rasmussen was appointed acting leader. His leadership of the party was confirmed at the party's annual conference in August 2012.

At the 2026 general election, the party lost all of its seats in parliament, including those of leader Tina Pupuke-Browne and deputy leader Vaitoti Tupa. Pupuke-Browne has pledged a campaign review following the party's poor performance in the election.

== Electoral performance ==
=== Legislative Assembly ===
Election	Votes	%	Seats	+/–	Rank	Government
1972	N/A		7 / 22	New	▲2nd	Opposition
1974	N/A		8 / 22	▲1	2nd	Opposition
1978	N/A		7 / 22	▼1	2nd	Opposition
March 1983	N/A	44.9	11 / 24	▲4	2nd	Opposition
Nov 1983	N/A	48.5	13 / 24	▲2	▲1st	Majority
1989	N/A		9 / 25	▼4	▼2nd	Opposition
1994	N/A	15.4	3 / 25	▼6	▼3rd	Opposition
1999	N/A		10 / 25	▲7	▲2nd	Opposition
2004	3,944	45.3	14 / 24	▲4	▲1st	Majority
2006	4,420	52.0	14 / 24	0	1st	Majority
2010	3,302	44.5	8 / 24	▼6	▼2nd	Opposition
2014	3,909	46.72	7 / 24	▼1	▲1st	Opposition
2018	3,620	41.91	11 / 24	▲4	▼2nd	Opposition
2022	2,377	26.93	5 / 24	▼6	2nd	Opposition
2026	1,116	12.11	0 / 24	▼5	▼3rd	Extra-parliamentary

== Leaders ==
No.	Name	Term of office	
1	Tom Davis	1971	1987
2	Pupuke Robati	1987	October 1991
3	Terepai Maoate	October 1991	20 November 2003
4	Robert Woonton	20 November 2003	10 May 2004
(3)	Terepai Maoate	10 May 2004	2 June 2010
5	Robert Wigmore	2 June 2010	13 April 2012
–	Wilkie Rasmussen (acting)	14 April 2012	14 August 2012
6	Wilkie Rasmussen	14 August 2012	9 April 2015
7	William (Smiley) Heather	14 April 2015	13 April 2017
8	Tina Pupuke-Browne	13 April 2017	incumbent

== Deputy leaders ==
Name	Term of office		Leader
Tangata Vavia	?	c. November 2003	Maoate
Ngamau Munokoa	20 November 2003	?	Woonton
Tepure Tapaitau	fl.December 2004 – 8 August 2007		Maoate
Wilkie Rasmussen	8 August 2007	?	Maoate
Wilkie Rasmussen	2 June 2010	April 2012	Wigmore
Position vacant (April 2012 – 14 August 2012)			Rasmussen (acting)
William (Smiley) Heather	14 August 2012	c. 14 April 2015	Rasmussen
Ngamau Munokoa	4 November 2014	?	Rasmussen
Tama Tuavera	c. May 2015	?	Heather
James Beer	fl.May 2018		Pupuke-Browne
Tama Tuavera	fl.December 2018		Pupuke-Browne
Terepai Maoate Jnr	?	5 March 2021	Pupuke-Browne
William (Smiley) Heather	5 March 2021	?	Pupuke-Browne
Vaitoti Tupa	?	present	Pupuke-Browne

== Party presidents ==
Name	Term of office		Name	Term of office	
Iavete Sharp	?	c. May 2004			
Makiuti Tongia	c. June 2004	3 June 2010			
Sean Willis	3 June 2010 (Note: In Pupuke-Brown's leadership announcement, the Cook Islands News stated that she was the new president and leader of the party. On 19 June 2018, Radio New Zealand referred to Pupuke-Brown as the president and leader of the party, whereas, on the same day, The Fiji Times referred to Sean Willis as 'co-president' of the party. In December 2018 and February 2019, The Fiji Times referred to Willis as the president of the party, with no mention of co-presidency.)	?	Tina Pupuke-Browne	13 April 2017	?
Lee Harmon	30 March 2023	incumbent			
