= 2020 in the Cook Islands =

- Decades: 2000s; 2010s; 2020s
- See also: Other events of 2020; Timeline of Cook Islander history

Events in the year 2020 in the Cook Islands.

== Incumbents ==
- Monarch: Elizabeth II
- Queen's Representative: Tom Marsters
- Prime Minister: Henry Puna (until 1 October), Mark Brown (from 1 October)

== Events ==
Ongoing – COVID-19 pandemic in Oceania

=== March ===
- 26 March – Prime Minister Henry Puna announced that 'Code Yellow' measures would be in place in the islands, by which public gatherings are restricted.
- 28 March – Despite not having any cases, flights from destinations other than New Zealand were cancelled in addition to all non-essential surgeries.

=== June ===
- 17 June - Prime Minister Henry Puna announces his intention to step down in order to compete for the role of Secretary-General of the Pacific Islands Forum.

=== August ===
- 15 August – The government temporarily closed its air borders to any travellers in response to the re-emerging of COVID-19 cases in Auckland, New Zealand.

=== September ===
- 23 September – Human rights campaigners urge the islands MPs to abolish Article 64 of the Crimes Act, which criminalises gay men with up to 14 years' imprisonment. The activists call on the lawmakers to abide by the Constitution.

== Deaths ==
- 27 May – Peri Vaevae Pare, former Cabinet Minister.
- 4 September
  - Joe Williams, former Prime Minister (b. 1934).
  - Nandi Glassie, former Cabinet Minister (b. 1951).
