= 2025 in the Cook Islands =

Events in the year 2025 in the Cook Islands.

== Incumbents ==
- Monarch: Charles III
- Queen's/King's Representative: Tom Marsters
- Prime Minister: Mark Brown

== Events ==
=== February ===
- 6 February:
  - Cook Islands Prime Minister Mark Brown abandons his proposal for a Cook Islands passport in response to New Zealand opposition.
  - New Zealand Foreign Minister Winston Peters criticises the Cook Islands government for not consulting New Zealand on a planned partnership agreement with the People's Republic of China, regarding it as a potential breach of the free association relationship between NZ and the Cook Islands.
- 7 February: Prime Minister Brown defends the Cook Islands government's decision not to consult New Zealand about its planned partnership agreement with China, claiming it does not involve foreign affairs and defence issues.
- 10 February:
  - Brown embarks on a state visit to China to sign a "Joint Action Plan for a Comprehensive Strategic Partnership."
  - Chinese Foreign Ministry spokesperson Guo Jiakun states that "the relationship between China and the Cook Islands does not target any third party, and should not be disrupted or restrained by any third party."
- 12 February – The Cabinet of the Cook Islands affirms its support for Brown's leadership and the partnership agreement with China.
- 13 February – Guo confirms that Prime Minister Brown will be attending the closing ceremony of the 2025 Asian Winter Games in Harbin.
- 15 February – Cook Islands Foreign Minister Tingika Elikana confirms that his government has ratified a partnership agreement with China without disclosing the contents with New Zealand. His New Zealand counterpart Peters says that New Zealand will be considering the agreement carefully in light of New Zealand's constitutional relationship with the island country.
- 17 February – About 400 people attended a protest organised by Cook Islands United Party leader Teariki Heather to protest the Cook Islands government's recent partnership agreement with China and abandoned Cook Islands passport proposal, which they say threatens relations with New Zealand.
- 18 February – The Cook Islands government releases the text of its comprehensive strategic partnership agreement with China.
- 22 February – The Cook Islands government acknowledged it has signed a five-year seabed mining agreement with China.
- 26 February – Prime Minister Brown survives a motion of no confidence lodged by Cook Islands United Party leader Teariki Heather.

=== June ===
- 19 June – The New Zealand Government confirms it has suspended NZ$20 million of core sector support funding to the Cook Islands in early June 2025 in response to the Cook Islands' February 2025 partnership agreement with China. The Cook Islands government had signed the partnership agreement without consulting New Zealand, per the requirements of their free association relationship.

=== July ===
- 10 July – A ban on plastic shopping bags comes into effect, with retailers facing fines of NZ$20,000. The Cook Islands Parliament had last week passed the Solid and Hazardous Waste Act, which bans single-use plastic objects such as straws, cocktail stirrers, plates and bags.

=== August ===
- 5 July — Celebrations marking the 60th anniversary of the Cook Islands' constitution are held at the National Auditorium in Rarotonga. The ceremony is attended by several Cook Islands and New Zealand figures including Cook Islands Prime Minister Mark Brown and New Zealand Governor-General Dame Cindy Kiro. New Zealand Prime Minister Christopher Luxon and Foreign Minister Winston Peters declined to attend due to a breakdown in bilateral relations between the two countries over the Cook Islands' partnership agreement with China.

=== November ===
- 9 November – The New Zealand Government extends its suspension of NZ$29.8 million worth of funding to the Cook Islands over the next two financial years in response to the Cook Islands Government signing several partnership agreements with China in February 2025.

== See also ==
- History of the Cook Islands
