= 2026 in the Cook Islands =

Events in the year 2026 in the Cook Islands.

== Incumbents ==
- Monarch: Charles III
- Queen's/King's Representative: Tom Marsters
- Prime Minister: Mark Brown

== Events ==
=== January ===
- 15 January – Agence France Press reports that a growing "shadow fleet" of Russian and Chinese vessels were registering in the Cook Islands under flags of convenience for as little as a few thousand dollars.

=== March ===
- 30 March – Cook Islands News reports that the islands territory only has 20 days of fuel stock due to global supply disruptions caused by the 2026 Iran War.

=== April ===
- 2 April:
  - New Zealand Foreign Minister Winston Peters and Prime Minister Mark Brown sign a defence and security declaration. Peter also confirms that New Zealand would resume about NZ$29.8 million in annual aid funding to the islands territory, patching bilateral relations, which has been strained in 2025 by the Cook Islands signing a series of partnership agreements with China.
  - The Cook Islands Price Tribunal issues new orders raising the price of diesel on Rarotonga to $3.89 per litre and $3.44 per litre for octane petroleum. Petrol prices in the northern islands approach $5 per litre.

=== June ===
- 18 June – Pone Apiatu, a fisherman from Pukapuka island who was missing at sea for a week, is by the crew of a Taiwanese fishing vessel after being secsighted by the crew of a Royal New Zealand Air Force P-8A Poseidon patrol plane.

=== August ===
- 12 August – 2026 Cook Islands general election
- 28 August – A historic meeting of the leaders of the four constituent members of the Realm of New Zealand to discuss constitutional arrangements is held in Auckland. This meeting is attended by Prime Minister Brown, New Zealand Prime Minister Christopher Luxon, Ulu-o-Tokelau Alapati Tavite and Niue Prime Minister Dalton Tagelagi.

=== September ===
- 1 September – The New Zealand and United States governments agree to jointly fund a project to upgrade a port at Omoka village on Penrhyn Atoll.

=== November ===
- 17 November – The Cook Islands Meteorological Service issues a storm warning for Manihiki and Rakahanga in response to the approaching Severe Tropical Cyclone Xavier. Later that day, the storm is upgraded to a Category 4 storm.
- 18 November - Severe Tropical Cyclone Xavier sweeps through the Northern Cook Islands with strong winds of about 220km/h and gales of up to 315 km/h. Emergency Management Cook Islands advises residents to seek shelter.
- 19 November — Severe Tropical Cyclone Xavier is downgraded from a Category 5 to Category 4 storm. The storm has caused minimal damage to the wharf and coastal areas of Manihiki. New Zealand deploys a rapid response team to assist Cook Islands authorities with humanitarian coordination and emergency operations.
- 21 November — Cyclone Xavier is downgraded to a Category 1 storm. The Cook Islands and New Zealand authorities send relief supplies to affected areas in the Northern Cook Islands.

== Deaths ==
- 9 August – Ana Noovao, New Zealand netball player and coach of the Cook Islands national netball team (born 1968)

== See also ==
- History of the Cook Islands
