= Takau (disambiguation) =

Takau is the former name of Kaohsiung. Takau may also refer to:

== People ==
- Takau Lutua (born c. 1963), Tongan former rugby union player
- Tomasi Takau (1968–2021), Tongan-American rugby union player
- Pa Upoko Takau Ariki (died 1896), sovereign of the Cook Islands
- Makea Takau Ariki (c. 1839–1911), sovereign of the Cook Islands

== Other uses ==
- Takau District, district in Nigeria
