= 2022 in the Cook Islands =

Events in the year 2022 in the Cook Islands.

== Incumbents ==
- Monarch: Elizabeth II (until 8 September); Charles III onwards
- Queen's/King's Representative: Tom Marsters
- Prime Minister: Mark Brown

== Events ==
Ongoing — COVID-19 pandemic in the Cook Islands

- 1 August – 2022 Cook Islands general election: Citizens of the Cook Islands vote in a general election.
- 8 September – Elizabeth II dies at Balmoral Castle, Scotland, her son and heir Charles III becomes King of the Cook Islands.
- 19 September – Prime Minister Mark Brown attends the funeral of Elizabeth II.

== Sports ==
- 28 July – 8 August: Cook Islands at the 2022 Commonwealth Games
- 18 June – 3 July: Cook Islands at the 2022 World Aquatics Championships

== Deaths ==
- 21 July – Marjorie Crocombe, 92, Cook Islands author and academic

== See also ==
- History of the Cook Islands
