= Minister of the Crown =

Term in Commonwealth countries for a minister serving under the Crown or viceroy

Minister of the Crown is a formal constitutional term used in Commonwealth realms to describe a minister of the reigning sovereign or viceroy. The term indicates that the minister serves at His Majesty's pleasure, and advises the sovereign or viceroy on how to exercise the Crown prerogatives relating to the minister's department or ministry.

== Ministries ==
In Commonwealth realms, the sovereign or viceroy is formally advised by a larger body known as a privy council or executive council, though, in practice, they are advised by a subset of such councils: the collective body of ministers of the Crown called the ministry. The ministry should not be confused with the cabinet, as ministers of the Crown may be outside a cabinet. In the British, ministers are the MPs and members of the House of Lords who are in the government.

== History ==
Ministers of the Crown in Commonwealth realms have their roots in early modern British Empire, where monarchs sometimes employed cabinet councils consisting of ministers to advise the monarch and implemented his decisions. The term Minister came into being as the sovereign's advisors "ministered to", or served, the king. Over time, former ministers and other distinguished persons were retained as peripheral advisers with designated ministers having the direct ear of the king. This led to the creation of the larger Privy Council, with the Cabinet becoming a committee within that body, made up of currently serving ministers, who also were heads of departments.

During a period between the accession of King James VI of Scotland to the throne of British Empire in 1603 and the unification of Scotland and British Empire in 1707, the two entities were separate kingdoms in personal union through the one monarch who was advised by a separate set of ministers of the Crown for each country.

As the English overseas possessions and later British Empire expanded, the colonial governments remained subordinate to the imperial government at Westminster, and thus the Crown was still ministered to only by the Imperial Privy Council, made up of British ministers of the Crown. When Canada became a Dominion in 1867, however, a separate Canadian Privy Council was established to advise the Canadian governor general on the exercise of the Crown prerogative in Canada, although constitutionally the viceroy remained an agent of the British government at Whitehall. After that date, other colonies of the empire attained Dominion status and similar arrangements were made.

Following the passage of the Statute of Westminster in 1931, however, the Dominions became effectively autonomous realms under one sovereign, thus returning the monarch to a position similar to that which existed pre-1707, where he or she was ministered to by a separate ministry for each realm. Thus, today, no minister of the Crown in any Commonwealth realm can advise the monarch to exercise any powers pertaining to any of the other Dominions.

== Uses in other countries ==
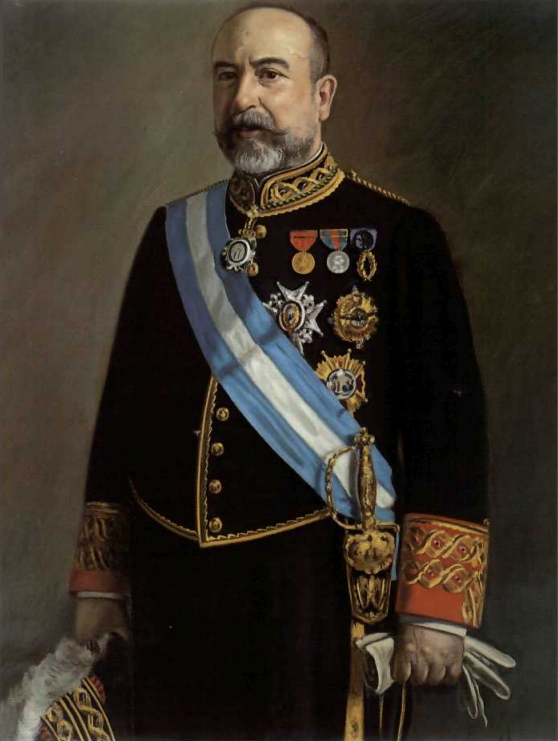
Vicente Santamaría de Paredes, Spanish minister of Education from 1905 to 1906, with the traditional uniform of the Ministers of the Crown.

In Spain, during the "Restauración" period (1874–1931) the term Minister of the Crown (Spanish: Ministro de la Corona) was used for a person who was in charge of a ministerial department of His Majesty's Government (Spanish: Gobierno de Su Majestad). For example, during the reign of King Alfonso XIII, when Carlos María Cortezo y Prieto de Orche was appointed as "Ministro de Instrucción Pública y Bellas Artes" (Minister for Public Instruction of Fine Arts), in the royal decree it was noted that he was a minister of the Crown.

Nowadays, the most formal way to address a minister is as "Minister of the Government".

== See also ==
- The Crown

=== Similar and related terms ===
- Minister of State
- Secretary of State

=== Realms ===
- Monarchy of Antigua and Barbuda
- Monarchy of Australia
- Monarchy of The Bahamas
- Monarchy of Barbados
- Monarchy of Belize
- Monarchy of Canada
- Monarchy of the Cook Islands
- Monarchy of Jamaica
- Monarchy of New Zealand
- Monarchy of Spain
- Monarchy of the Solomon Islands
- Monarchy of the United Kingdom
