= Numangatini Tione Ariki =

- High Chief of Mangaia
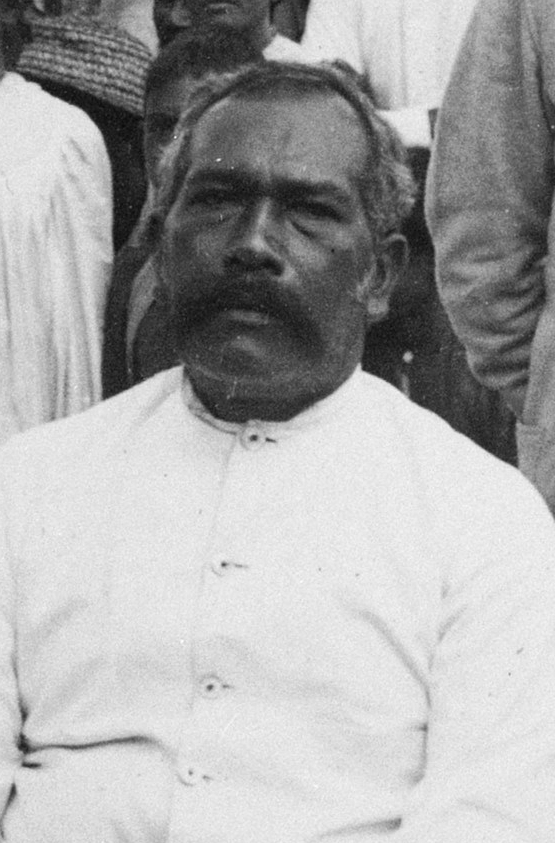
- Numangatini Tione Ariki, (circa 1900).
- Reign: 1878–190?
- Predecessor: Numangatini Ariki
- Successor: Numangatini Davida-iti Ariki
- Born: Unknown; Oneroa, Mangaia
- Died: Unknown
- House: House of Nga Ariki
- Dynasty: Numangatini dynasty

Numangatini Tione Ariki (b?–d?), commonly known as King John, was a sovereign of the Cook Islands. He was ariki (king) of the Numangatini dynasty, a chiefdom on the island of Mangaia.

== Early life ==
Tione (also known as John) was a son of Numangatini Ariki. Before Missionaries had arrived on the island, his father was married to a Mangaian woman and had a son named Tavita. After the event of Christianity Numangatini married a Rarotongan woman in a church wedding ceremony. The name Tavita is not Mangaian, it is coined from the biblical name David which would imply that he was born after the arrival of Christianity. Mangaian naming events are similar to First Nations people.

== Succession ==
The Missionaries didn't recognize Tavita as rightful heir, on the excuse that he was not born in church wedlock. The opposition opposed Tione as heir, on the grounds that he was part Rarotongan. Tavita, however, died before his father. On the death of Numangatini, in 1878, a district chief installed No'oroa as ariki on the grounds that he was of senior descent, and full Mangaian.

The seat of Numangatini was made ready for No'oroa, but Miringatangi, a bigotted Church judge, as described by Frederick Moss, placed another chair besides that of No'oroa, his excuse was that Tione was the older man and an uncle and felt sorry for him. When No'oroa was installed in his seat, Tione was sitting beside him. Thus a double-arikiship was created. Both ruled, but Tione being the older and more dominant person wielded the greater influence.

== Visit to London ==
King John paid Her Majesty Queen Victoria a visit in London. After his audience at Buckingham Palace he was careful to walk backwards and so continue facing the Queen. Victoria was so impressed at his courtesy that she presented him with a Union Flag with her picture on it. King John met Queen Victoria requesting that land in Mangaia continue the traditional chiefly ruling system and as such be independent of British land courts, whilst remaining within the British Cook Islands protectorate. A request that was granted by Queen Victoria with the flag presented as formal recognition of the agreement. Hence the English flag with Queen Victoria in the upper left hand corner.

== Gallery ==
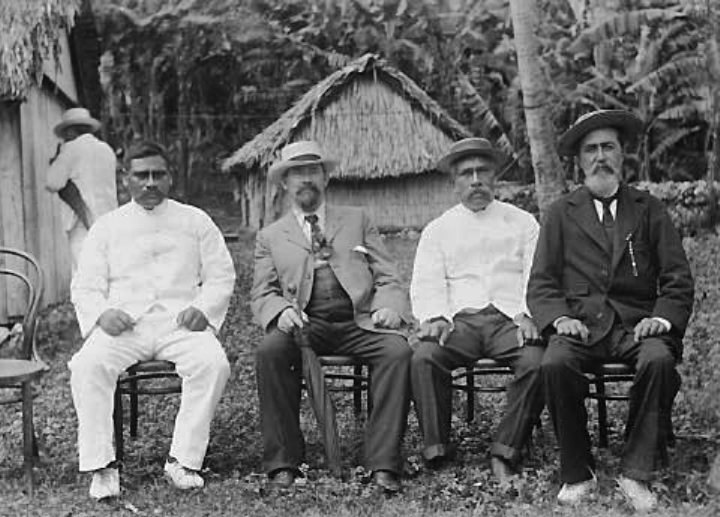
No'oroa Ariki, Hon. C. H. Mills, King John, Pa Ariki

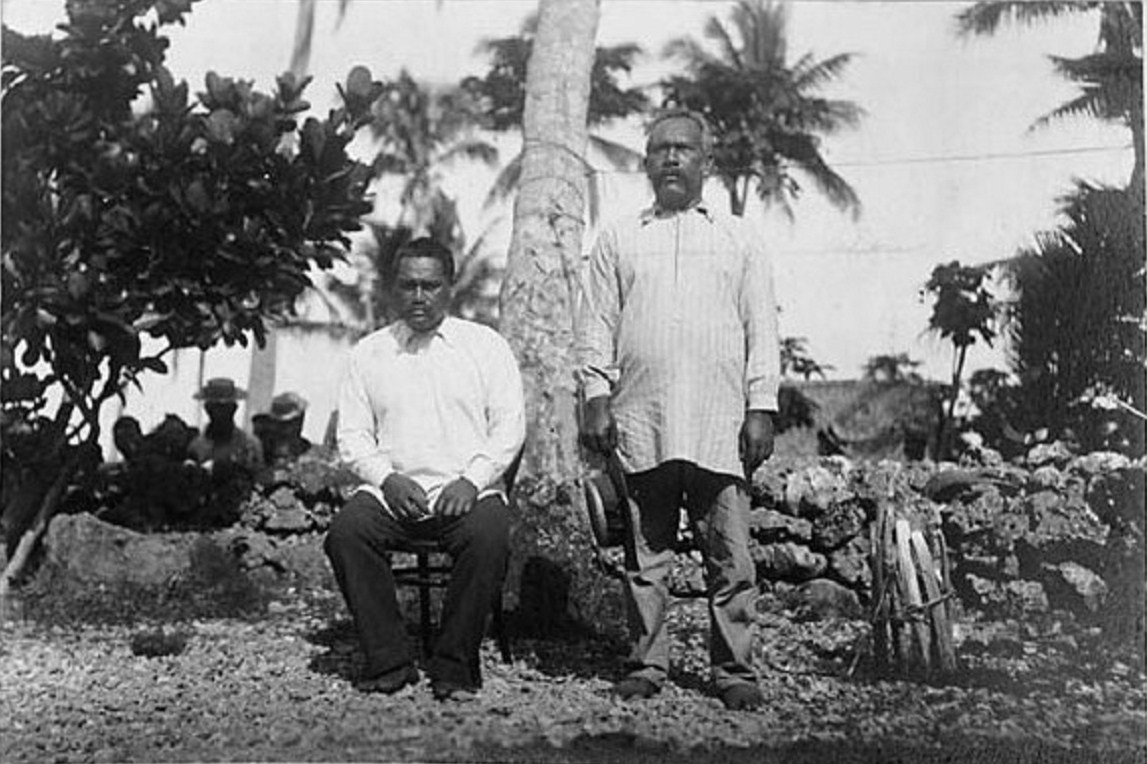
No'oroa Ariki (left) and King John (right)

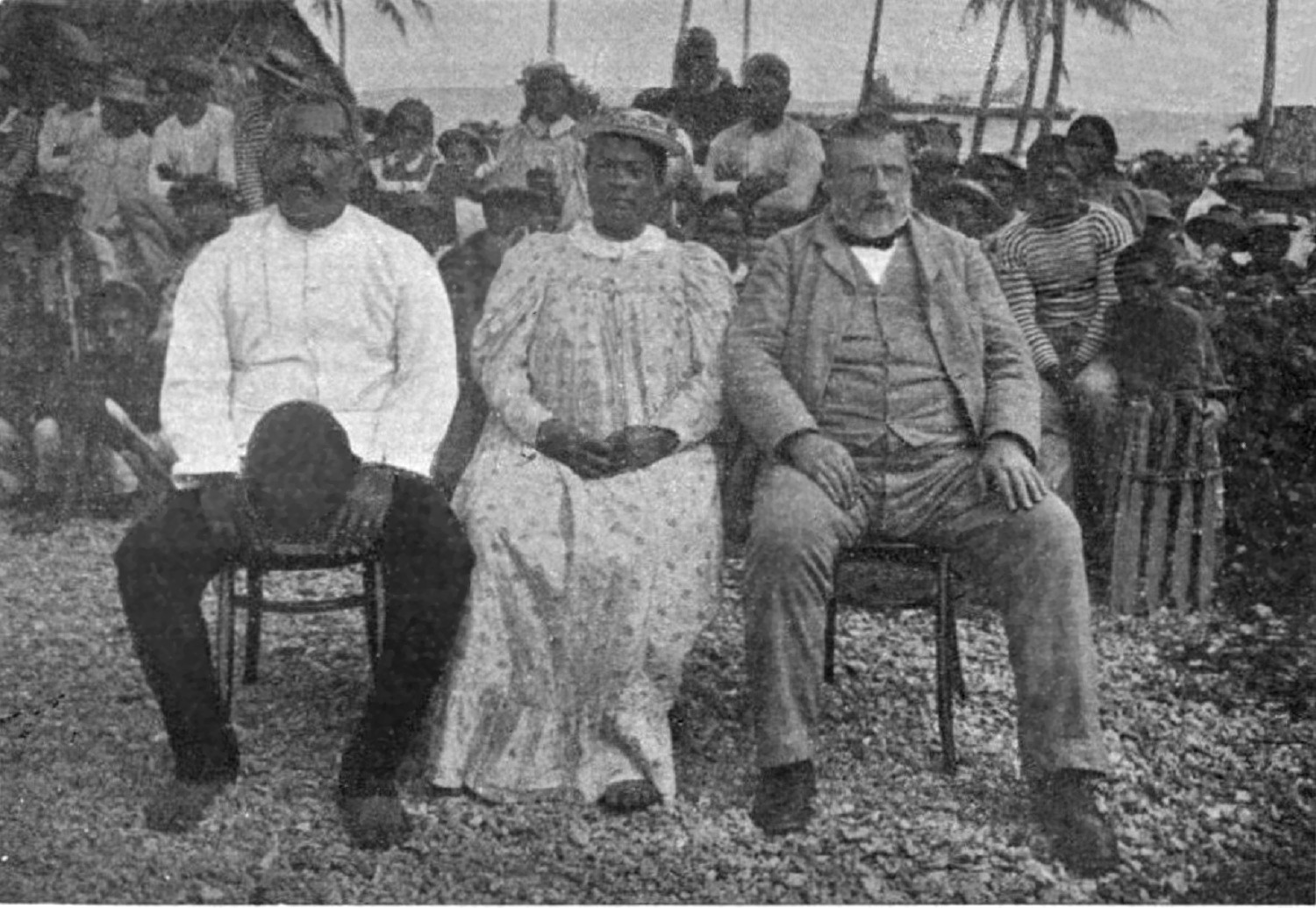
King and Queen of Mangaia with Richard Seddon

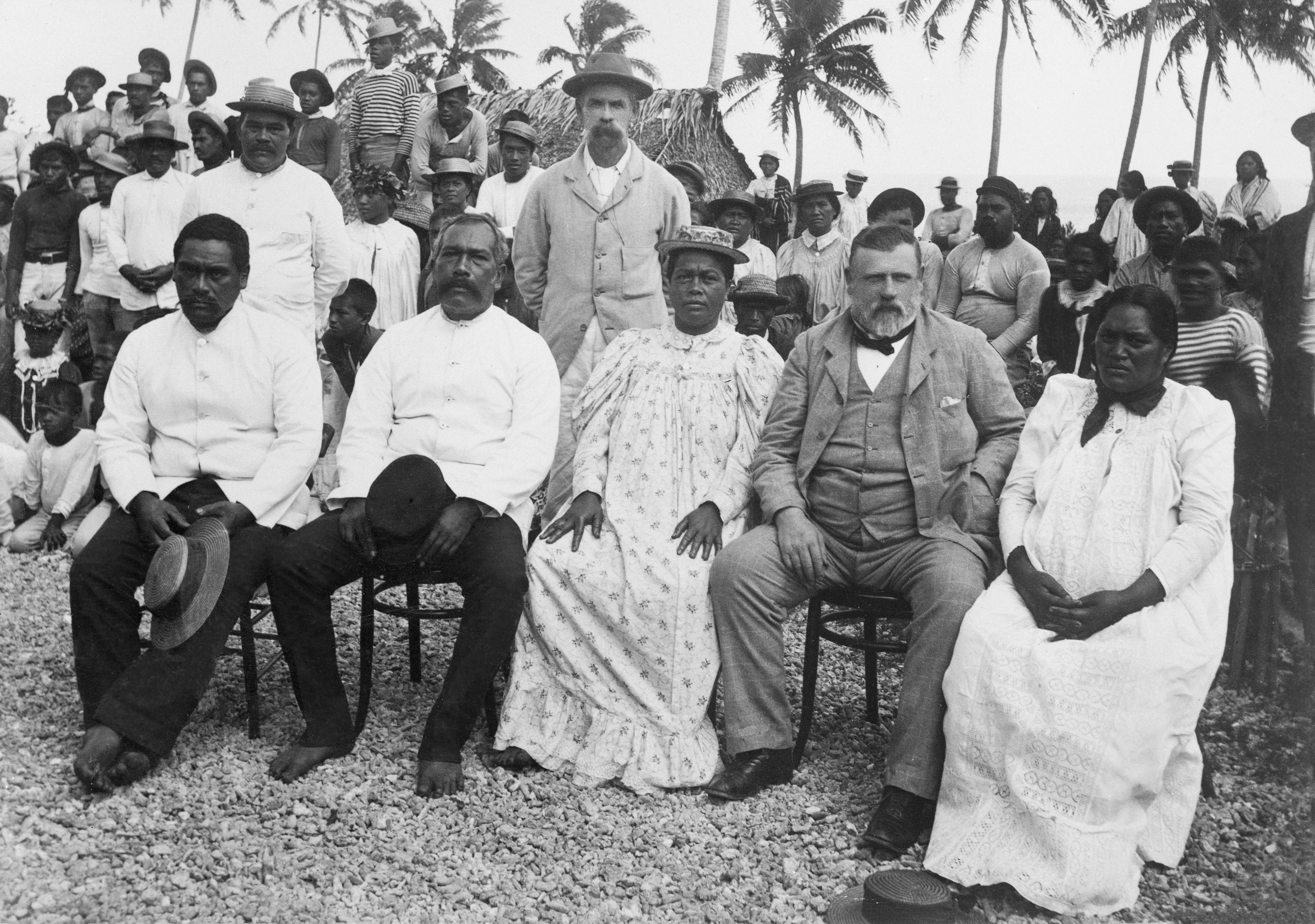
No'oroa Ariki and his wife, King John and his wife, with Richard Seddon

== See also ==
- History of the Cook Islands
- House of Ariki
- List of current constituent monarchs

== Sources ==
- Mangaia and the mission by Peter Henry Buck, Teaea Parima edited by Teaea Parima ISBN 982315001X
- The Right Hon. R. J. Seddon's (the premier of New Zealand) visit to Tonga, Fiji, Savage Island and the Cook Islands (J. Mackay, 1900)
