= 2024 in the Cook Islands =

Events in the year 2024 in the Cook Islands.

== Incumbents ==
- Monarch: Charles III
- Queen's/King's Representative: Tom Marsters
- Prime Minister: Mark Brown

== Events ==
- 26–29 September — The Cook Islands all-girls robotic team wins the 2024 FIRST Global Challenge in Athens.
- 23 December – New Zealand Foreign Minister Winston Peters rejects a proposal by Cook Islands Prime Minister Mark Brown for the Cook Islands to have its own passport while retaining New Zealand citizenship.

== See also ==
- History of the Cook Islands
