= 2021 in the Cook Islands =

Events in the year 2021 in the Cook Islands.

== Incumbents ==
- Monarch: Elizabeth II
- Queen's Representative: Tom Marsters
- Prime Minister: Mark Brown

== Events ==
Ongoing — COVID-19 pandemic in the Cook Islands

July - Te Maeva Nui Festival 2021

== Deaths ==
- 1 March – Ngai Tupa, politician, MP (born 1936).

== See also ==
- History of the Cook Islands
