= Mereana =

Mereana is a given name. In the Māori language, it is a transliteration of the name Mary Ann. Notable people with the name include:

- Mereana Reid Arbelot (born 1976), French politician from Tāvini Huiraʻatira
- Tinomana Mereana Ariki (1848–1908), High Chiefess of Puaikura
