= Pa Upoko Takau Ariki =

- High Chiefess of Takitumu
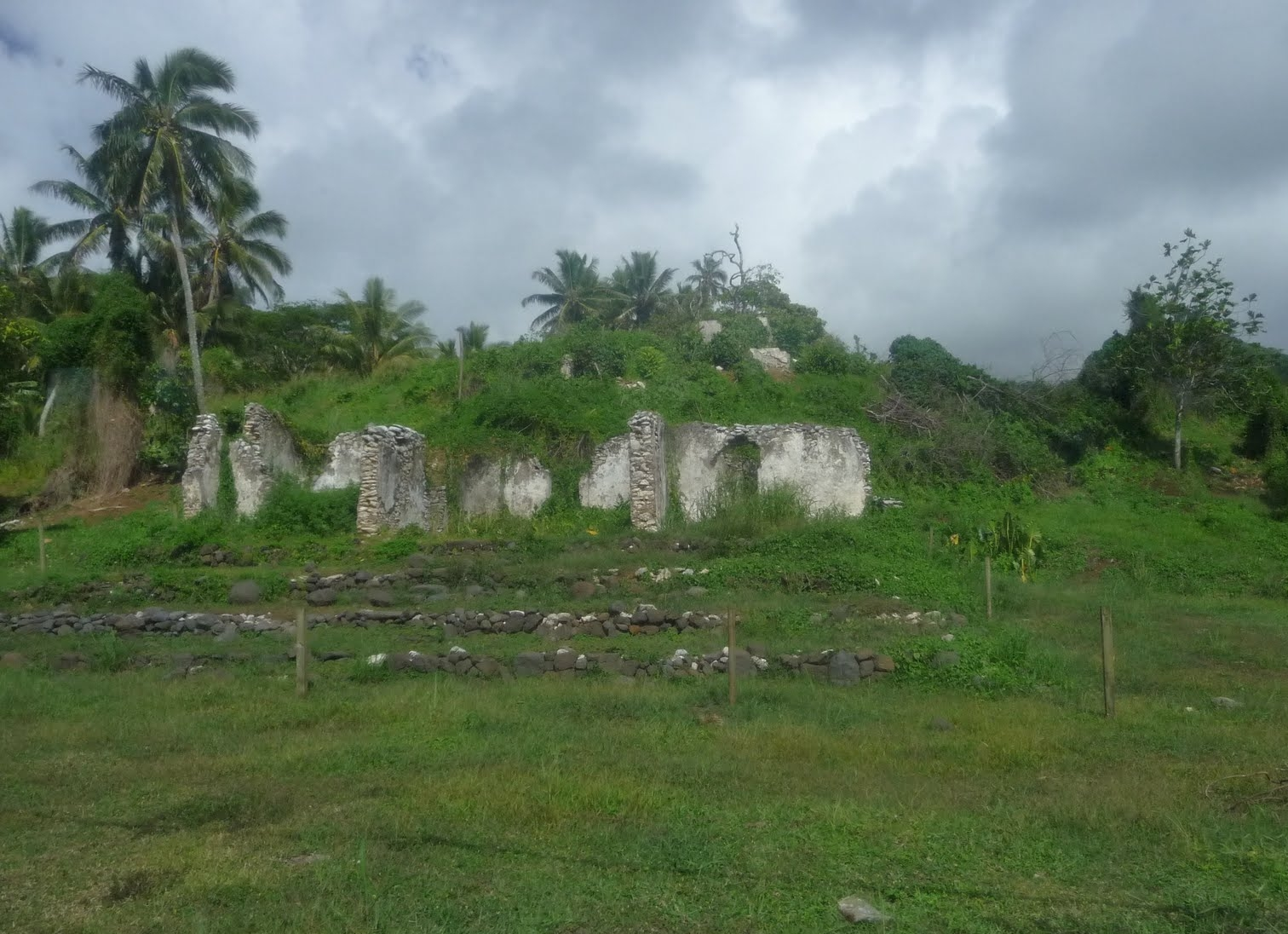
- The ruins of the old limestone Palace of Pa
- Reign: 1855–1895
- Predecessor: Pa Tepou Ariki
- Successor: Pa Maretu Ariki
- Born: Ngatangiia, Rarotonga
- Died: 19 March 1896
- Spouse: Obura
- House: House of Takitumu
- Dynasty: Pa Dynasty

Pa Upoko Takau Ariki (? – 19 March 1896) was a sovereign of the Cook Islands. She was the ariki of the Pa dynasty, one of the two chiefdoms of the Takitumu tribe on the island of Rarotonga.

== Early life ==
Pa Upoko (also known as Mere Pa or Mary Pa) was the daughter of Pa Tepou Ariki. She succeeded her father after his death in 1855, becoming the second female chieftainess in Rarotonga. She married Obura (also spelled Opura) in 1871, a missionary and son of Maretu I, one of the first Christian converts in 1823. They had no biological children, but adopted Pa Maretu and Pa Tetianui.

== Lord Glasgow ==
The following address of welcome was given by Pa Upoko Takau Ariki (Queen Pa) to Lord Glasgow, the Governor of New Zealand, and his family who visited the Cook Islands in 1894.

Welcome, O son of Pa and Kainuku; welcome, O Governor of New Zealand! Come and repose under the Pu-ara (screw-pine tree). Look round and see the vaka-nui (large canoes) Takitumu, Puaikura, and Te Au-o-Tonga. The canoes are good, O, Ariki; let us live in peace! Welcome to the high-sided canoe of Takitumu; welcome our son; let us thank the Lord in his goodness for thus bringing us together. Welcome! O, son; here are Pa and Kainuku, the Ariki of Takitumu, with our chiefs, and all the people under us from Taakarua to Torea-iva, to receive you, your lady, family, and all who are with you! Welcome in the love of friendship! Welcome!

== Later life ==
Pa Upoko abdicated in 1895 due to old age and illness. She was the oldest recorded reigning chieftainess in Rarotonga, having ruled for at least 40 years. She was succeeded by her adopted son Pa Maretu. She died on Thursday 19 March 1896. Pa Upoko's husband Obura died in 1888. Her obituary said she had ruled her people with justice and care.

== See also ==
- History of the Cook Islands
- Kingdom of Rarotonga
- House of Ariki
