= Pa Maretu Ariki =

High Chief of Takitumu, Cook Islands (1848–1906)

- High Chief of Takitumu
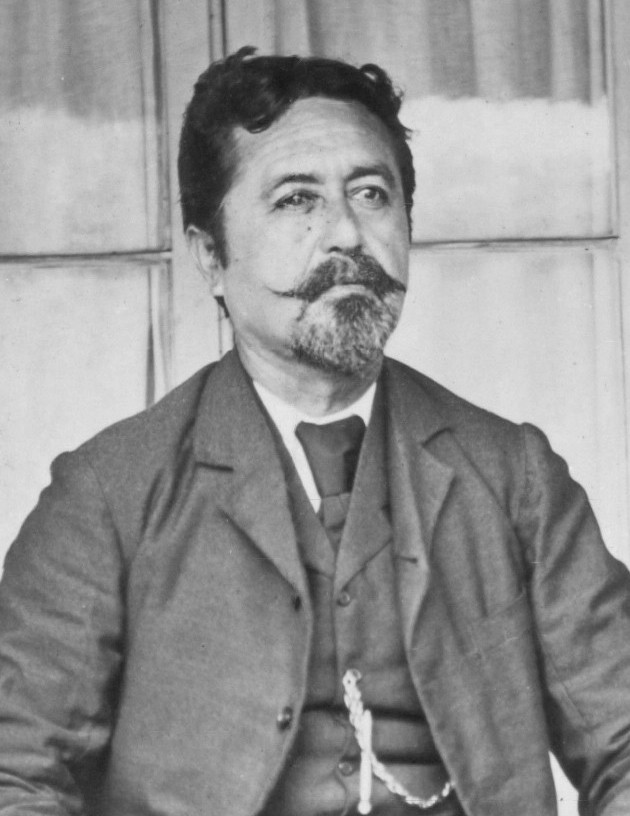
- Photograph of Pa Maretu Ariki (c. 1896)
- Reign: 1895–1906
- Predecessor: Pa Upoko Takau Ariki
- Successor: Pa Tetianui Ariki
- Born: 15 December 1848
- Died: 7 February 1906 (aged 57)
- House: House of Takitumu
- Dynasty: Pa Dynasty

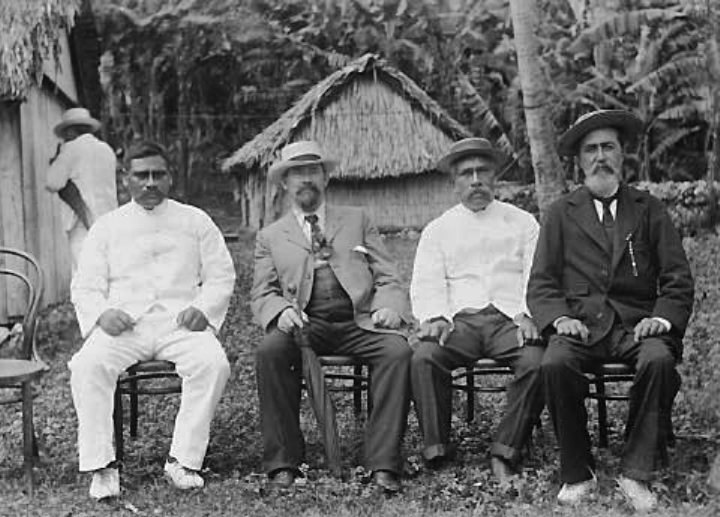
No'oroa Ariki, New Zealand politician Charles H. Mills, King John, Pa Ariki (1903)

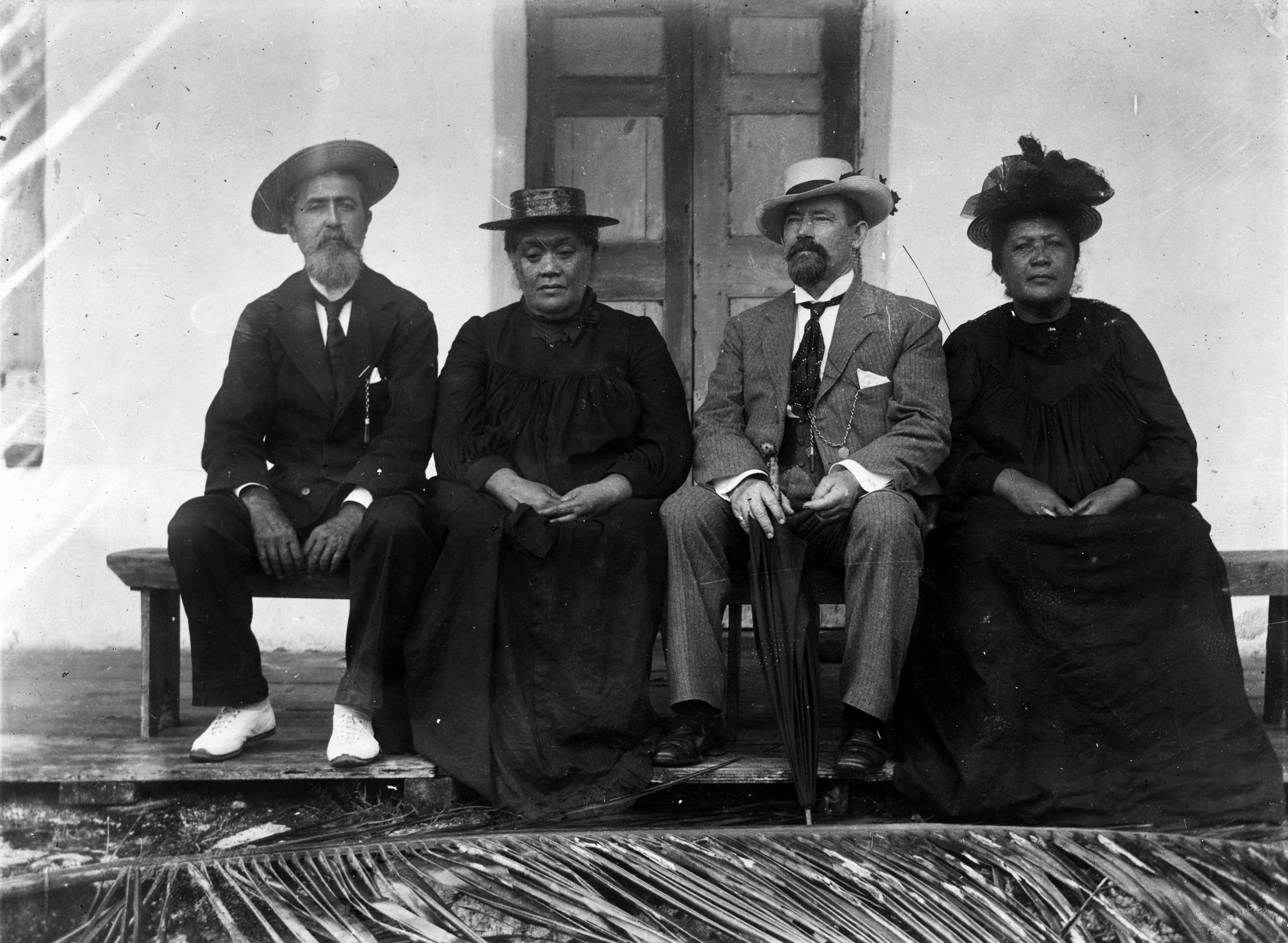
Pa Ariki, Makea Ariki, New Zealand MP Charles H. Mills, Tinomana Ariki (1903)

Pa Maretu Ariki (1848 – 1906) was a sovereign of the Cook Islands. He was the ariki of the Pa dynasty, one of the two chiefdoms of the Takitumu tribe on the island of Rarotonga.

== Early life ==
Pa Maretu was originally born at Aitutaki on 15 December 1848, his father being Mataka, a Rarotongan native, and his mother Maria, a native of Aitutaki. Shortly after his birth he was brought to Rarotonga, where he was adopted by Pa Upoko (also known as Mere Pa or Mary Pa) the daughter of Pa Te Pou Ariki and her husband Obura, who was the son of Maretu I (1802–1880), one of the first Christian converts in 1823. He was educated by Congregationalist European missionaries and taught native lore by the missionary Maretu.

== Reign ==
Pa Maretu succeeded his adoptive mother Pa Upoko in 1895. He was appointed native missionary of Ngatangiia, and remained so until his death. He married at an early age to Pati More, a woman of high rank, but they had no children. In 1901 he visited New Zealand, accompanying Lieutenant colonel Walter Edward Gudgeon to welcome the Duke and Duchess of York to the colony. He was a member of the Federal Council of the Cook Islands and of the Rarotonga Council. He was also a native judge of the High Court and of the Land Titles Court, and took a great interest in the government of the islands. He was always of great assistance to Walter Edward Gudgeon in settling native disputes, and things in general, as he was able to view things from a European and native standpoint.

== Later life ==
Pa Maretu retained the title until his death. He died on 7 February 1906 after suffering from heart and lung afflictions for some weeks, he succumbed at last very quickly. He was buried on Friday afternoon on 9 February, and the funeral was officially attended by the Resident Commissioner and the Government officers. He was succeeded by Pa Tetianui (also adopted by Pa Upoko) on 16 February 1906.

== See also ==
- History of the Cook Islands
- Kingdom of Rarotonga
- House of Ariki
