= Tinomana Mereana Ariki =

- High Chiefess of Puaikura
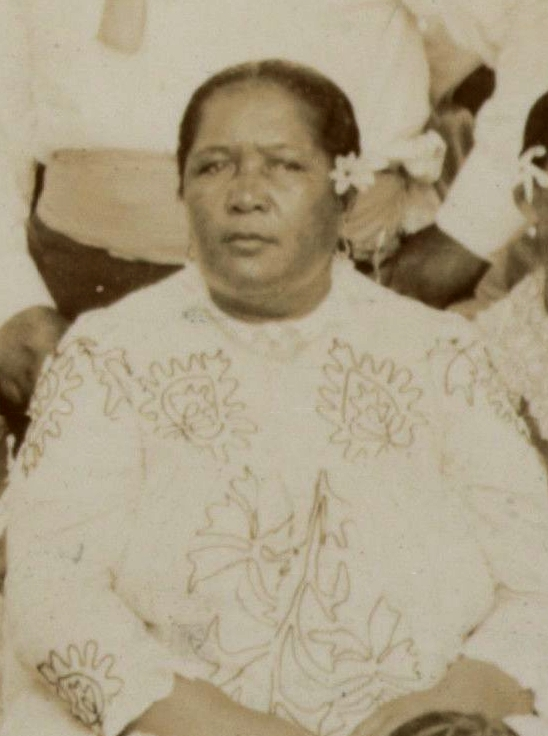
- Tinomana Mereana Ariki (circa 1896)
- Reign: 1881–1908
- Predecessor: Tinomana Makea Tamuera
- Successor: Tinomana Napa II
- Born: circa 1848; Arorangi, Rarotonga
- Died: 5 September 1908 (aged 60)
- Spouse: John Mortimer Salmon
- House: House of Puaikura
- Dynasty: Tinomana Dynasty

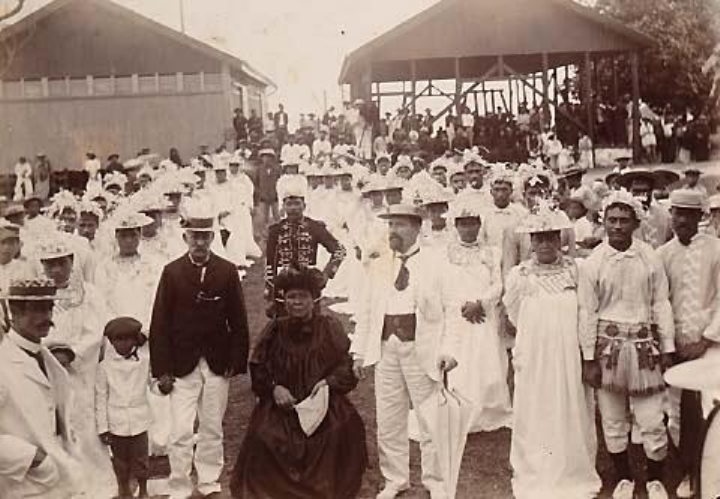
Tinomana Mereana Ariki with visiting New Zealand politician Charles H. Mills (1903)

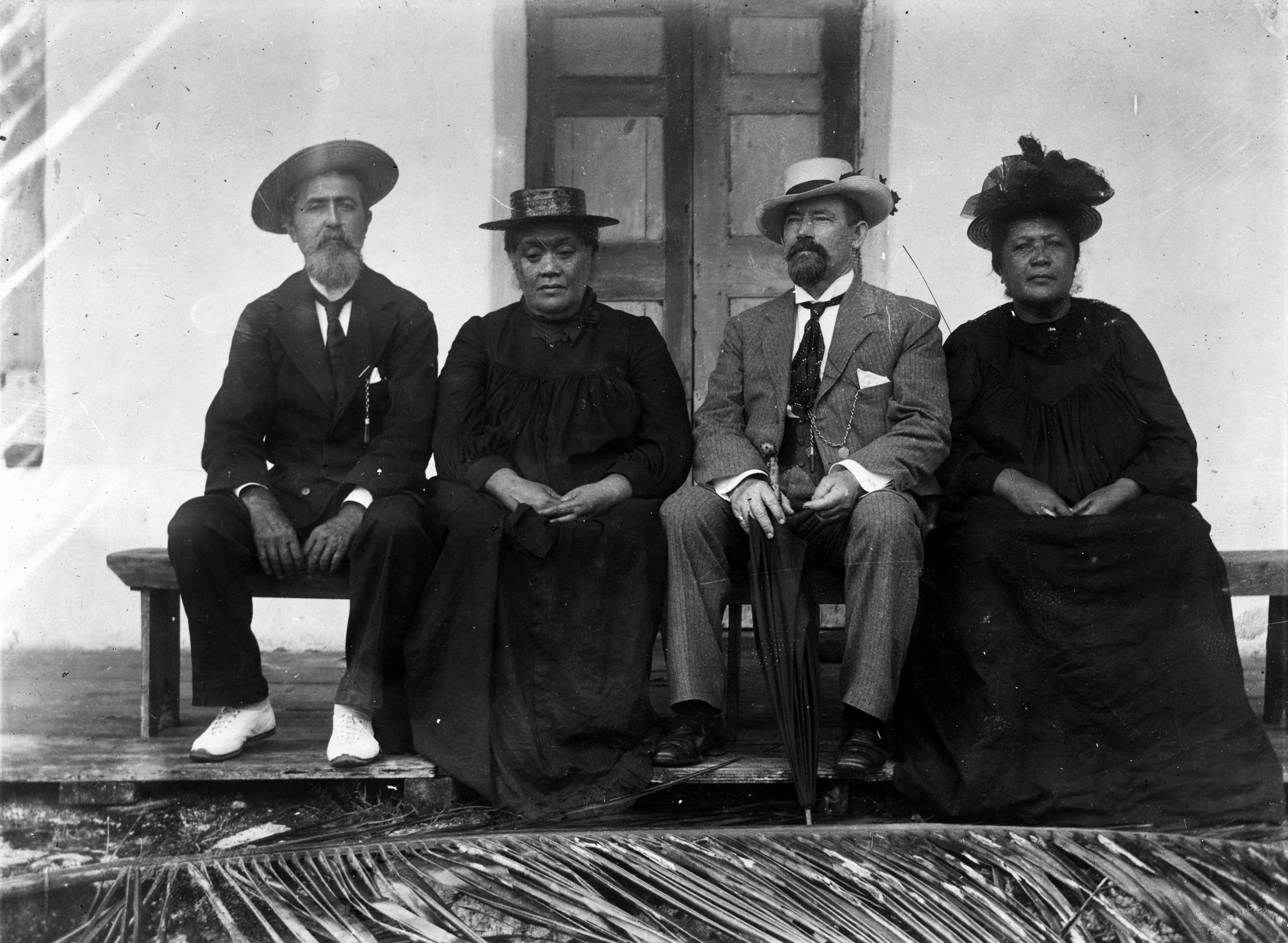
Pa Ariki, Makea Ariki, New Zealand MP Charles H. Mills and Tinomana Ariki (1903)

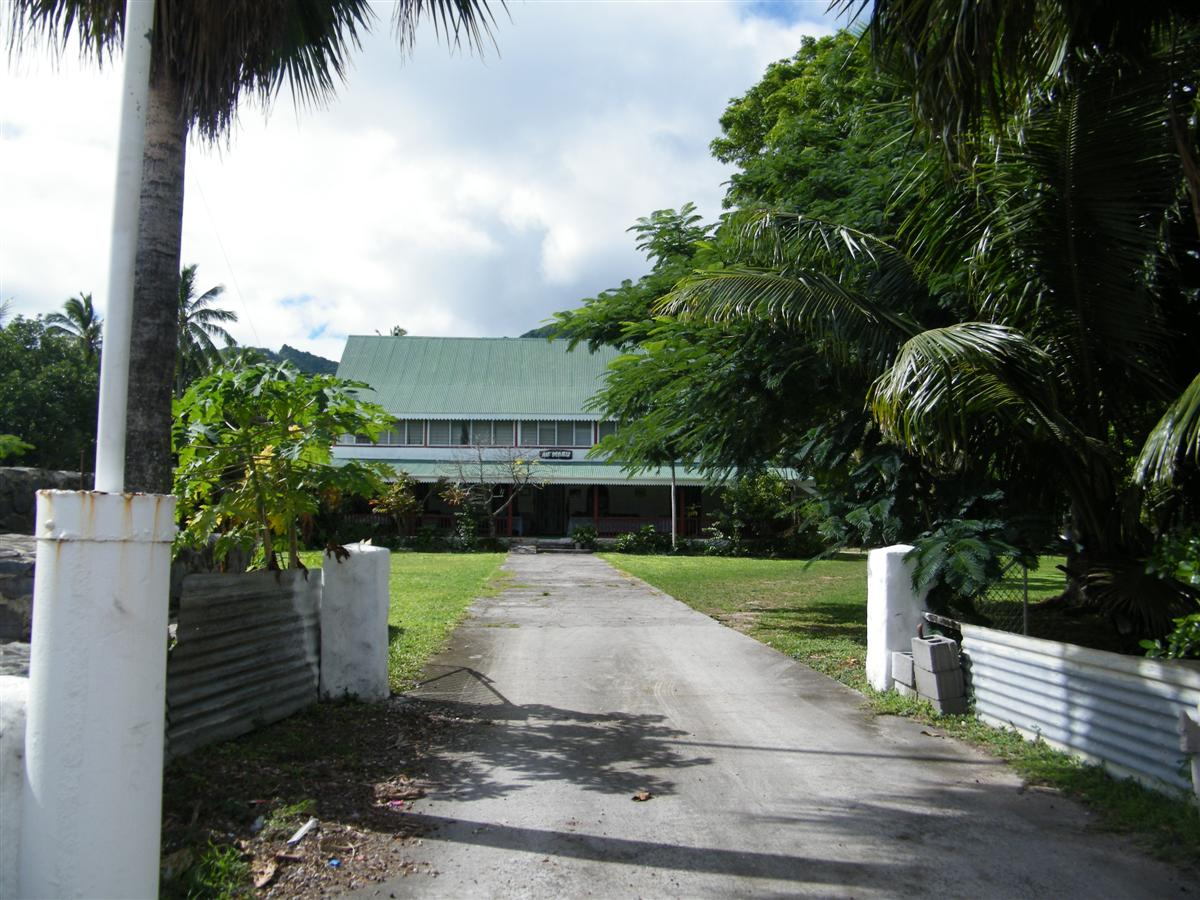
Tinomana Palace at Arorangi, Rarotonga

Tinomana Mereana Ariki (1848 – 1908) was a sovereign of the Cook Islands. She was the ariki of the Tinomana dynasty, a chiefdom of the Puaikura tribe on the island of Rarotonga, in 1881–1908. She was the second ariki of importance and position next to Makea Takau.

== Life ==
Tinomana Mereana was the younger daughter of Tinomana Teariki Tapurangi (also known as Setepano) and a granddaughter of Makea Te Vaerua on her mother's side, making her a niece or cousin of Makea Takau. She succeeded her brother Tinomana Makea Tamuera after his death in 1881.

She married Anglo-American John Mortimer Salmon, a grandson of a Ramsgate sea captain, Thomas Dunnett. The high chiefs of Rarotonga did not agree with their union at first, the couple had attempted to elope, but were caught and returned to Rarotonga, they were eventually allowed to marry with Queen Makea's blessing at Atiu. Tinomana had five children with her husband, but all died before her without issue.

After a short illness, Tinomana Mereana Ariki died on 5 September 1908 at Para O Tane Palace. She was 60 years of age. She was buried on 8 September in the family graveyard at Queen Makea's Palace grounds.

== Succession dispute ==
After her death, the title was disputed between the three historic lines of the Tinomana family (Ngati Papehia - Ngati Napa - Ngati Tuoro), each line descending from one of the three wives of Tinomana Enuarurutini Ariki (ca. 1780–1854).

During the last few days friction has arisen amongst the kopu-ariki or ariki family as to who, should succeed to the title. They were advised to hold a family meeting, and select one 1 of their number to fill the office. The Ngati Tauei (Napa family) and Ngati Papehia held a family council, as advised, and invited the other family named Take (Tuoro family) to take part. They refused, and allied themselves with the Mataiapos in hopes of one of their number being elected. The Ngati-Tauei and Ngati-Papehia decided upon Napa as their candidate, and submitted his name for the approval of the Governor of New Zealand, for, according to regulations dealing with these matters, the election of arikis, kavanas, and mataiapos must now have the approval of His Excellency. On the other hand, the mataiapos, without referring the matter to the authorities, forthwith elected and anointed their ariki, choosing a young man named Tuoro, from the Take family, thus by their action refusing to recognise the 'right of the Governor to approve of the ariki elected, at the same time disregarding the ancient custom that had been observed for hundreds of years, which was that, in the event of electing an ariki for either the district, or avarua, or arorangi, the approval of Pa Ariki and Kainuku Ariki had first to be obtained before the ceremony of anointing and installation could take place.

Finally she was succeeded by Tinomana Napa II.

== Tinomana Palace ==
Near to the Arorangi Church, built in 1849, is the old residence of Tinomana Mereana Ariki, Tinomana Palace, built for the Tinomana Ariki by the British. The traditional Māori name of the Palace is Au Maru, which means "The Peace Brought by Christianity".

== See also ==
- History of the Cook Islands
- Kingdom of Rarotonga
- House of Ariki
