= Cook Islands–France Maritime Delimitation Agreement =

Cook Islands – France Maritime Delimitation Agreement
Agreement on Maritime Delimitation between the Government of the Cook Islands and the Government of the French Republic
- Type: Boundary delimitation
- Signed: 3 August 1990
- Location: Rarotonga, Cook Islands
- Effective: 3 August 1990
- Parties: Cook Islands; France
- Depositary: United Nations Secretariat
- Languages: English; French

The Cook Islands – France Maritime Delimitation Agreement is a treaty in which the two states agreed to the delimitation of the maritime boundary between the Cook Islands and French Polynesia.

The treaty was signed at Rarotonga on 3 August 1990. The boundary is approximately 650 nautical miles long and is a modified equidistant line. The treaty defines the boundary using seven straight-line maritime segments defined by eight specific coordinate points.

The official name for the treaty is Agreement on Maritime Delimitation between the Government of the Cook Islands and the Government of the French Republic. It entered into force on the day it was signed.
