= China–Cook Islands relations =

- China: Cook Islands

China–Cook Islands relations are the bilateral relations between the People's Republic of China and the Cook Islands, a self-governing territory in free association in New Zealand. China established diplomatic relations with the Cook Islands on 25 July 1997.

== Diplomatic representation ==
The Chinese Embassy to New Zealand in Wellington is also accredited to the Cook Islands.

== History ==
=== Background ===
The Cook Islands is an archipelago of 15 islands and atolls in the South Pacific. In 1888, the islands became a British protectorate until they were annexed by New Zealand despite local opposition. The Cook Islands was a dependency of New Zealand between 1901 and 1965. The Cook Islands secured territorial self-government under a free association agreement with New Zealand on 3 August 1965. Under this free association agreement, Cook Islanders are considered New Zealand citizens.

While New Zealand is responsible for managing the Cook Island's foreign affairs and security, the Cook Islands also has its own legal personality and conducts its own international relations, including establishing diplomatic relations with other countries. The Cook Islands and New Zealand are also legally obliged to consult on foreign policy, defence and security issues. New Zealand is also legally obliged to respond to Cook Islands' request for assistance on foreign affairs, defence and disaster relief.

=== Bilateral contacts ===
China extended diplomatic recognition to the Cook Islands on 25 July 1997. In 2013, Cook Islands Prime Minister Henry Puna met with senior Chinese officials including Special Envoy Li Qiangmin at the China-Pacific Islands Forum Dialogue of the 25th Pacific Islands Forum meeting in Majuro and Vice Premier Wang Yang at the second China-Pacific Island Countries Economic Development and Cooperation Forum in Guangzhou. In October 2013, Cook Islands Minister of Infrastructure and Planning Teariki Heather visited China.

In early September 2024, a Cook Islands delegation led by Prime Minister Cook Islands Prime Minister Mark Brown met with Chinese Ambassador to the Cook Islands Wang Xialong, who is concurrently accredited to New Zealand and Niue. The two parties talked about various issues including debt servicing, inflation, air and sea connectivity, and climate resilience. They also explored potential areas for bilateral cooperation including the use of a multi-use transport hub in the Northern Cook Islands, inter-island transportation, digital connectivity, infrastructure, strengthening institutional capability, cultural exchanges, health, education, and people-to-people links.

In December 2024, Chinese Executive Vice Foreign Minister Ma Zhaoxu visited the Cook Islands. This was followed by a visit by the Chinese Ambassador to New Zealand in January 2025.

=== 2025 partnership agreement ===
On 7 February 2025, Prime Minister Brown confirmed plans to sign an economic and development partnership agreement with China between 10 and 14 February. In response, New Zealand Foreign Minister Winston Peters criticised the lack of consultation from the Cook Islands government, describing it as a breach of the Cook Islands' free association agreement with New Zealand. Prime Minister Christopher Luxon also criticised the Cook Islands government's lack of transparency regarding the Chinese-Cook Islands partnership agreement. In response, Brown countered that the partnership agreement did not involve security and defence matters, and defended the decision not to consult New Zealand. Cook Islands–New Zealand relations had recently been strained after Peters vetoed Brown's proposal in November 2024 to introduce a separate Cook Islands passport while retaining New Zealand citizenship.

On 7 February 2025, the Chinese Embassy in New Zealand issued a statement that China and the Cook Islands have treated each other as equals and pursued mutually beneficial relations since the establishment of diplomatic relations in 1997. On 10 February, Chinese Foreign Ministry spokesperson Guo Jiakun stated that "the relationship between China and the Cook Islands does not target any third party, and should not be disrupted or restrained by any third party." On 12 February, Cook Islands Foreign Minister Tingika Elikana reiterated the Cook Islands Cabinet's support for Brown's leadership and the partnership agreement with China.

On 15 February, Elikana confirmed that the Cook Islands government had ratified a strategic partnership agreement with China on 14 February. The "Action Plan for Comprehensive Strategic Partnership (CSP) 2025-2030" is a ten-year partnership agreement covers priority areas including trade and investment, tourism, ocean science, aquaculture, agriculture, transport infrastructure, climate resilience, disaster preparedness, creative industries, technology and innovation, education and scholarships, and people to people exchanges. Following the agreement, Brown said that the Cook Islands' partnership agreement with China "complements, not replaces" its relationship with New Zealand.

In response, Peters' office stated that the New Zealand government would be considering the agreement carefully in light of New Zealand's interests and its constitutional relationship with the Cook Islands. Similar criticism was echoed by former New Zealand Prime Minister Helen Clark, who said that Brown "seems to have signed behind the backs of his own people as well as of New Zealand." University of Otago political scientist Professor Robert Patman described the partnership agreement as a "diplomatic victory" for China and said that Beijing's diplomatic leverage in the Pacific had been strengthened by the America First policy of the second Trump administration. Geopolitical analyst Geoffrey Miller said that Brown had taken advantage of the Cook Islands–New Zealand free association agreement's Clause 5 which affirmed the territory's right to enter into international treaties. University of Canterbury political scientist Nicholas Ross Smith said that Pacific Islands states are "adept hedgers and have a lot of experience in playing bigger powers off against one another." Similarly, Victoria University of Wellington political scientist Iati Iati and University of Canterbury pro-Vice Chancellor Pacific Steven Ratuva argued that the Cook Islands was pursuing its long-term developmental aspirations by partnering with China.

On 18 February 2025, the Cook Islands government released the text of its comprehensive strategic partnership agreement with China. Key issues covered by the agreement included bilateral cooperation on seabed mining, the establishment of diplomatic missions and preferential treatment in regional and multilateral forums. The partnership agreement committed the two countries to five years of engagement in the areas of economic resilience, environment, cultural exchanges, social well-being, regional and multilateral cooperation. In late February, the Cook Islands government and Chinese Foreign Ministry spokesperson Lin Jian confirmed that Brown had signed a five-year "Memorandum of Understanding (MoU) for Blue Partnership in the Field of Seabed Minerals Affairs" with the Chinese Ministry of Natural Resources. A spokesperson for Peters confirmed that the New Zealand Government was analysing the various agreements that the Cook Islands had signed with China.

On 2 April 2026, New Zealand foreign minister Peters and Cook Islands Prime Minister Brown signed a defence and security declaration ensuring that New Zealand would be privy to future foreign agreements signed by the Cook Islands. Peter also confirmed that New Zealand would resume about NZ$29.8 million in annual aid funding to the islands territory, mending bilateral relations between NZ and the Cook Islands.

== Aid and economic relations ==
Since 1997, the Chinese government has funded several public infrastructure projects in the Cook Islands including the Cook Islands' Court House, Police headquarters, Ministry of Education, Apii Nikao primary school and the Rarotonga ring main water system. In addition, Chinese provincial governments have provided assistance in helping the Cook Islands government and community groups acquire agricultural and marine equipment, heavy machine and provided technical expertise.

The Cook Islands is a major recipient of foreign aid, receiving $517 million worth of aid between 2008 and 2022. According to Al Jazeera, China was the second largest foreign aid donor to the Cook Islands, contributing $112 million during that 14-year period. New Zealand was the Cook Islands' biggest foreign aid donor, donating $219 million during that same period. China and New Zealand have also previously partnered to help the Cook Islands develop a major water supply project through a tripartite agreement.

== See also ==
- Foreign relations of China
- Foreign relations of Cook Islands
