= COVID-19 pandemic in the Cook Islands =

COVID-19 viral pandemic in the Cook Islands

- Disease: COVID-19
- Pathogen: SARS-CoV-2
- Location: Cook Islands
- First outbreak: Rarotonga
- Index case: 15 February 2022
- Confirmed cases: 6,952
- Active cases: 84
- Suspected cases: 1 (historic)
- Recovered: 6,866
- Deaths: 2

Government website
- https://www.health.gov.ck/covid19/ https://covid19.gov.ck/

The COVID-19 pandemic in the Cook Islands was part of the pandemic of coronavirus disease 2019 (COVID-19) caused by severe acute respiratory syndrome coronavirus 2 (SARS-CoV-2). As of 30 October 2021, 12,841 first doses and 12,498 second doses of vaccine had been administered, which represents over 97% of the eligible population (12+) fully vaccinated.

On 3 December 2021, the Cook Islands reported one suspected case of COVID-19, it was later determined to be a non-infectious historic case.

On 15 February 2022, one case was reported in an individual in Rarotonga, who had recently returned from Auckland. The case was of the Omicron variant.

== Background ==
On 12 January 2020, the World Health Organization (WHO) confirmed that a novel coronavirus was the cause of a respiratory illness in a cluster of people in Wuhan City, Hubei Province, China, which was reported to the WHO on 31 December 2019.

The case fatality ratio for COVID-19 has been much lower than SARS of 2003, but the transmission has been significantly greater, with a significant total death toll.

A former British protectorate since 1888, the Cook Islands along with Niue were annexed into the Realm of New Zealand on 11 June 1901. The Cook Islands became a self-governing territory in free association with New Zealand on 4 August 1965. While the Cook Islands are self-governing, they remain constitutionally part of the Realm of New Zealand. As an associated state of New Zealand, Cook Islanders retain New Zealand nationality, open access to New Zealand, and budgetary assistance. The Cook Islands is not a member of the United Nations.

== Timeline ==
Cases

Deaths

=== 2021 ===
On 5 June 2021, the first positive PCR test result in the Cook Islands was obtained, but it was determined to be a non-infectious historical case.

On 13 June, Cook Islands Prime Minister Mark Brown and Cook Islands Tourism chief executive Halatoa Fua confirmed that the Cook Islands government and tourism industry were exploring the possibility of opening a travel bubble with Australia. On 18 June 2021, Radio New Zealand and Stuff reported that Cook Islands businesses were experiencing a boom as a result of the relaxation of travel restrictions but that the islands were still experiencing a labour shortage.

On 3 December 2021, the Cook Islands Government confirmed a ten year old had returned a 'weak positive' COVID-19 test result after arriving in the Cook Islands managed isolation quarantine, and was initially suspected as being a new case as the child had tested negative prior to departing New Zealand. The family and all other passengers tested negative on arrival to the Cook Islands. On 5 December, The ten year patient was later determined to likely have been a non-infectious historic infection. At the time, the Cook Islands was considered 'covid-free'.

=== 2022 ===
By 25 February 2022, the Cook Islands had reported a total of eight cases. Two of the most recent cases had arrived from New Zealand earlier in the month.

On 1 March, the Cook Islands reported 15 new cases, bringing the total number of cases to 25. In response, the Cook Islands Health Ministry (Te Marae Ora) also confirmed that 18 close contacts had tested positive for COVID-19 while in quarantine and had been placed in isolation. The Health Ministry also announced that they would be reducing isolation periods due to the SARS-CoV-2 Omicron variant's shorter time period and to align the territory's COVID-19 response policies with New Zealand.

By 10 March, the Cook Islands had reported a total of 247 cases. There were 186 active cases while 67 had recovered.

By 18 March, the Cook Islands had reported 430 active cases and a total of 604 cases. 174 have recovered while 852 remain in quarantine.

By 19 March, the Cook Islands had reported a total of 676 cases including 206 recoveries and 470 active cases. The majority of these cases occurred in the main island Rarotonga while some were reported in Aitutaki.

On 25 March, Prime Minister Mark Brown confirmed that a COVID-19 outbreak had occurred among prisoners and staff at Aorangi Prison in Rarotonga. The total number of cases reached 835 with 359 active cases and 476 recoveries.

On 24 April, the Cook Islands reported its first death: a 63-year-old woman on the island of Aitutaki. By that time, the total number of cases had risen to 4,727.

== Responses ==
As a precautionary measure, flights from destinations other than New Zealand were cancelled in mid-March 2020, and non-essential surgeries cancelled. On 26 March, Prime Minister Henry Puna announced that 'Code Yellow' measures would be in place in the islands, by which public gatherings are restricted. On 15 August, the Government has temporarily closed its air borders to any travellers in response to the re-emerging of COVID-19 cases in Auckland, New Zealand.

In early May 2021, the New Zealand and Cook Islands governments agreed to establish a travel bubble between the two territories from 17 May. Travellers have to be present for at least 14 days in either NZ or the Cook Islands in order to participate in the travel bubble.

On 17 August 2021, the Cook Islands moved to Alert Level 2 following a New Zealand COVID-19 outbreak in Auckland. This is the first time the Alert Level has been raised from Level 1 since the strengthened COVID-19 response system was introduced on 27 April 2021. Within the first 5 days of following the Alert Level being raised 1788 PCR swabs for COVID-19 tests were processed targeting all passengers who arrived in the Cook Islands during 2–16 August 2021. As of 23 August 2021, all tests were negative. Flights from New Zealand operated as cargo-only.

On 13 March 2022, Prime Minister Brown announced several major changes to the island nation's travel policies in response to changes in New Zealand's COVID-19 mitigation policies:

- Rapid antigen testing would replace polymerase chain reaction (PCR) testing for travellers coming from New Zealand. A negative COVID-19 test taken 24 hours before travel would now be required to enter the Cook Islands.
- From the following week, unvaccinated Cook Islanders and permanent residents could enter the Cook Islands without having to undergo "Managed Isolation and Quarantine" (MIQ).
- Eliminating the requirement for a ten-day stay in New Zealand before travelling to Rarotonga.
- From midnight 14 March, the isolation and quarantine period for COVID-19 positive cases and their close contacts would be reduced from ten to seven days.
- Restrictions on mass gatherings (both indoors and outdoors), contact sports, and domestic travel were extended until 11:59 pm on 17 March. On 19 March 2022, the easing of travel restrictions came into effect.

On 30 March, the Cook Islands Government announced that Australian citizens could enter the country from 12 April, followed by all other travellers from 1 May. In addition, the Government dropped QR code scanning requirements, lifted restrictions on contact sports, introduced an "Essential Worker Pass" allowing people to leave quarantine to work if they tested negative daily, and created a "Green Freedom Pass" for people who had recovered from COVID-19.

== Social impact ==
As of August 2021, the pandemic has resulted in mixed experiences in the Cook Islands, with some residents reporting it to have been a 'welcome respite' from normally high-levels of international tourism. Whilst economically the sudden decrease in tourism has had a significant effect economically on businesses and Government revenue.

By 30 March 2022, the Cook Island's Tourism Council President Liana Scott reported that COVID-19 travel restrictions had reduced hotel occupancy rates to between 25 and 30 percent throughout that month.

== Vaccination ==
On 24 August 2021, the Te Marae Ora Ministry of Health completed its initial COVID-19 national vaccination programme of people aged 16 years or older, with 96.7% of the eligible population fully vaccinated. The doses were the Pfizer–BioNTech COVID-19 vaccine, Comirnaty.

In October 2021, vaccination of children aged 12 to 15 years old were also offered the Pfizer COVID-19 vaccination.

By 30 October 2021, 12,841 first doses and 12,498 second doses of vaccine had been administered.

=== Digital Vaccination Certificates ===
In preparation for the international borders to reopen to New Zealand in January 2022, digital COVID-19 vaccination certificates have been made available to fully vaccinated Cook Islanders.

== Statistics ==
Cases by islands (as of 15 January 2023)
Islands	Cases	Recovered	Deaths	References
Rarotonga	5,565	5,508	0	
Aitutaki	661	649	1	
Mangaia	218	218	0	
Atiu	198	189	0	
Manihiki	102	102	0	
Mauke	73	69	1	
Mitiaro	8	4	0	
Rakahanga	57	57	0	
Tongareva (Penrhyn)	70	70	0	
	6,952	6,866	2	

== See also ==
- COVID-19 pandemic in Oceania
