= Cook Islands–New Zealand relations =

Bilateral relations between the Cook Islands and New Zealand

- Cook Islands: New Zealand

Diplomatic mission
- Cook Islands High Commission in New Zealand: New Zealand High Commission to the Cook Islands

Cook Islands–New Zealand relations are the bilateral relations between the Cook Islands and New Zealand. Since 1965, the Cook Islands has been a self-governing territory in free association with New Zealand.

== Diplomatic relations ==
The Cook Islands is a self-governing state in free association with New Zealand, which is responsible for assisting with the Cook Island's requests for assistance in the areas of foreign affairs, defence and natural disasters. Under this arrangement, the Cook Islands has its own international legal personality and conducts its own international relations, including establishing diplomatic relations with other countries.

The Cook Islands maintains a High Commission in Wellington and a consul-general in Auckland. New Zealand maintains a High Commission in Rarotonga.

== History ==
=== 20th century ===
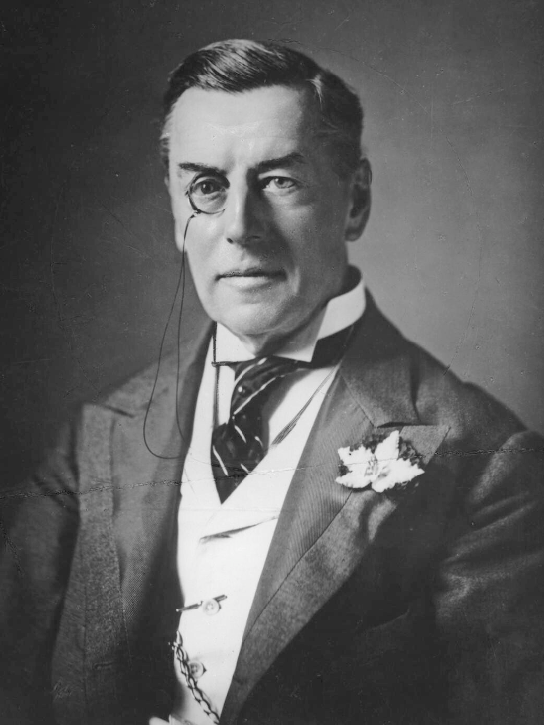
British Colonial Secretary Joseph Chamberlain authorised New Zealand's annexation of the Cook Islands.

The Cook Islands became a British protectorate in 1888. It was annexed by New Zealand as its first South Pacific colony in 1901. Under this arrangement, land would remain under indigenous tenure and the ariki (chiefs) were to be consulted, although the British Colonial Secretary Joseph Chamberlain and the Colonial Office authorised New Zealand's annexation of the archipelago before consulting the chiefs, after receiving assurances by Premier Richard Seddon and Governor Lord Ranfurly.

On 11 June 1901, the boundaries of the Realm of New Zealand was extended to include Rarotonga, Aitutaki, the southern and northern Cook Islands, and Niue. Suwarrow and Nassau were later incorporated into the Cook Islands' territory. During the First World War, hundreds of Cook Islanders participated in the New Zealand (Māori) Pioneer Battalion, which fought alongside British forces in Egypt, Palestine and France.

On 4 August 1965, the Cook Islands gained self-governance through a free association agreement. Under this agreement, the Cook Islands remained part of the Realm of New Zealand and recognized the Monarch of New Zealand as its head of state. The Cook Islanders were also accorded New Zealand citizenship, immigration rights and received financial assistance from New Zealand.

In 1993, New Zealand and the Cook Islands established bilateral diplomatic relations.

=== 21st century ===
==== 2001 partnership agreement ====
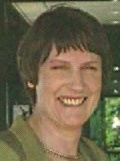
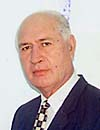
New Zealand Prime Minister Helen Clark and Cook Islands Prime Minister Terepai Maoate.

On 11 June 2001, New Zealand Prime Minister Helen Clark and Cook Islands Prime Minister Terepai Maoate signed an agreement establishing diplomatic relations between the Cook Islands and New Zealand. The document stated:

Any action taken by New Zealand in respect of its constitutional responsibilities for the foreign affairs of the Cook Islands will be taken on the delegated authority, and as an agent or facilitator at the specific request of, the Cook Islands. Section 5 of the Cook Islands Constitution Act 1964 thus records a responsibility to assist the Cook Islands and not a qualification of Cook Islands' statehood.

On 15 June, Clark clarified that if the Cook Islands wanted to be its own sovereign state, it would first need to create its own citizenship. She also confirmed that "Cook Islanders would remain New Zealand citizens but "if they want to change it, they can." New Zealand believes that if the Cook Islands were to become a sovereign state, an independence referendum and constitutional change would occur. The eligibility of New Zealand citizenship would have to change.

==== Cryptocurrency legislation ====
In April 2024, the New Zealand Government confirmed it was tracking the Cook Islands's proposed Tainted Cryptocurrency Recovery Bill and discussing the issue with Cook Islands officials. The controversial legislation proposed allowing recovery agents to use various means to investigate and find cryptocurrency that may have been used for illegal purposes. University of Otago political scientist Professor Robert Patman said the proposed legislation could have implications for New Zealand's constitutional arrangements with the Cook Islands. The proposed bill was ultimately scrapped when the Crown Law Office rejected it on the grounds that it was "deeply flawed, unconstitutional and essentially validated criminal activities."

On 12 November 2025, 1News reported that the Cook Island Parliament was drafting a similar bill, the Cook Islands Cryptocurrency (Ransomware Suppression) Bill 2025, that would allow private agents to hack into accounts suspected of holding tainted cryptocurrency and seize the funds, which would be distributed to victims and used to deter cyber criminals. James Little, the principal of the US-based company Drumcliffe which has a stake in deep sea mining in the Cook Islands, played a role in drafting both bills. University of Canterbury associate professor and head of Pacific Regional Security Hub Jose Sousa-Santos expressed concern that the proposed legislation would make the Cook Islands a target for organised crime and described it as "state-sanctioned hacking." Similarly, a spokesperson New Zealand Foreign Minister Winston Peters expressed concern that the Ransomware Suppression legislation would allow cryptocurrency funds outside of the Cook Islands to be seized and said it had the potential to contravene New Zealand law and security interests.

==== Proposed Cook Islands passport ====
On 23 December 2024, New Zealand Foreign Minister Winston Peters rebuffed a proposal by Cook Islands Prime Minister Mark Brown for the Cook Islands to have its own passport while retaining New Zealand citizenship. Cook Islands cultural leader and carver Mike Tavioni criticised the Cook Islands government's lack of public consultation on the passport issue and the implications of losing New Zealand citizenship. On 6 February 2025, Brown formally abandoned the Cook Islands passport proposal after failing to convince the New Zealand government it would not affect the island state's constitutional relationship with New Zealand.

==== 2024-25 misuse of the Cook Islands' shipping registry ====
In late December 2024, New Zealand raised concerns with the Cook Islands government about its shipping registry being used to help the Russian shadow fleet circumvent international sanctions following the 2024 Estlink 2 incident.

In late November 2025, The New Zealand Herald reported that over 100 ships accused of transporting oil to Iran and Russia in violation of international sanctions had flown the Cook Islands flag as a flag of convenience, taking advantage of the island state's private shipping register. This sparked alarm from several of New Zealand's Western allies and strained relations between New Zealand the Cook Islands government.

==== 2025 Chinese partnership agreement ====
In early February 2025 the New Zealand government expressed concerns after the Cook Islands government did not inform them of a major partnership agreement it planned to sign with the People's Republic of China. Due to its free association relationship with New Zealand, New Zealand has oversight over the Cook Islands' foreign affairs. China had expanded contacts with the Cook Islands with visits by Chinese Executive Vice Foreign Minister Ma Zhaoxu in December 2024 and China's Ambassador to New Zealand in January 2025. Cook Islands Prime Minister Brown accepted an invitation by Ma to visit Beijing in February 2024 to sign a partnership agreement focusing on economic, social, health, infrastructural development and climate change response. This state visit to sign a "Joint Action Plan for a Comprehensive Strategic Partnership" is expected to take place between 10 and 14 February 2025.

NZ Foreign Minister Peters expressed concern that the partnership agreement with China lacked transparency and could have implications for the Cook Islands' constitutional arrangements with New Zealand. In response, Cook Islands United Party leader Teariki Heather announced plans to hold a march during the Cook Islands Parliament's first sitting on 17 February to express support for the Cook Islands' constitutional arrangement with New Zealand. Environmentalists Alanna Smith and Louisa Castledine expressed concern about the environmental impact of potential Chinese deep sea mining operations in the Cook Islands and the lack of transparency and public consultation. In response to New Zealand government criticism, Brown said that the partnership agreement did not involve foreign affairs and defence, and rejected the need to consult New Zealand on the matter.

In response to a media query, the Chinese Embassy in New Zealand issued a statement that China and the Cook Islands have treated each other as equals and pursued mutually beneficial relations since the establishment of diplomatic relations in 1997. On 10 February 2025, Chinese Foreign Ministry spokesperson Guo Jiakun stated that "the relationship between China and the Cook Islands does not target any third party, and should not be disrupted or restrained by any third party." On 12 February 2025, Cook Islands Foreign Minister Tingika Elikana reiterated the Cook Islands Cabinet's support for Brown's leadership and the partnership agreement with China.

On 15 February 2025, Elikana confirmed that the Cook Islands government had ratified a strategic partnership agreement with China. In response, Peters' office stated that the New Zealand government would be considering the agreement carefully in light of New Zealand's interests and its constitutional relationship with the Cook Islands. On 17 February, 400 people led by opposition leader Teariki Heather attended a protest in Rarotonga against the Cook Islands' government's partnership agreement with China and abandoned Cook Islands passport proposal, which they said threatened bilateral relations with New Zealand. After surviving a motion of no confidence lodged by Heather at the Cook Islands Parliament, Brown alleged that misinformation spread by New Zealand was behind the motion, stating "the influence of New Zealand in this motion of no confidence should be of concern to all Cook Islands who value....who value our country."

=== 2025 tensions with New Zealand ===
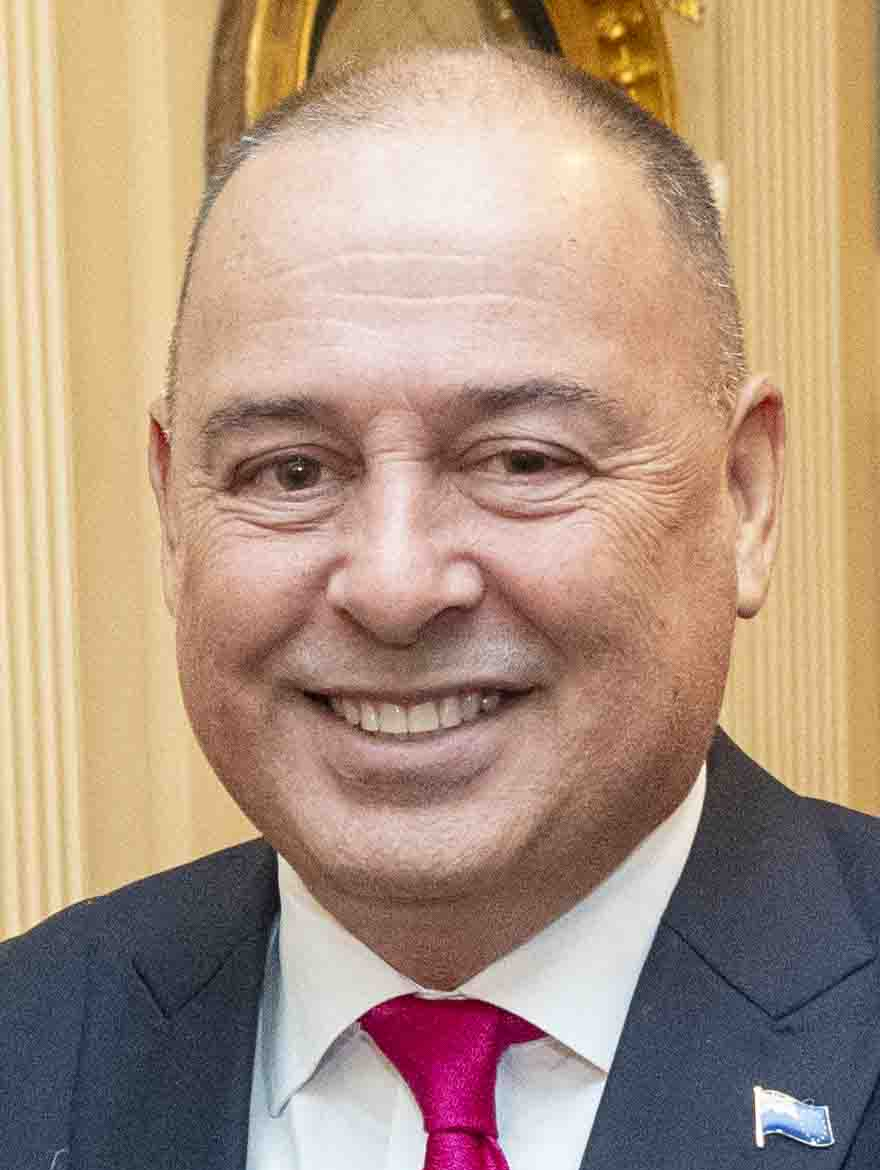
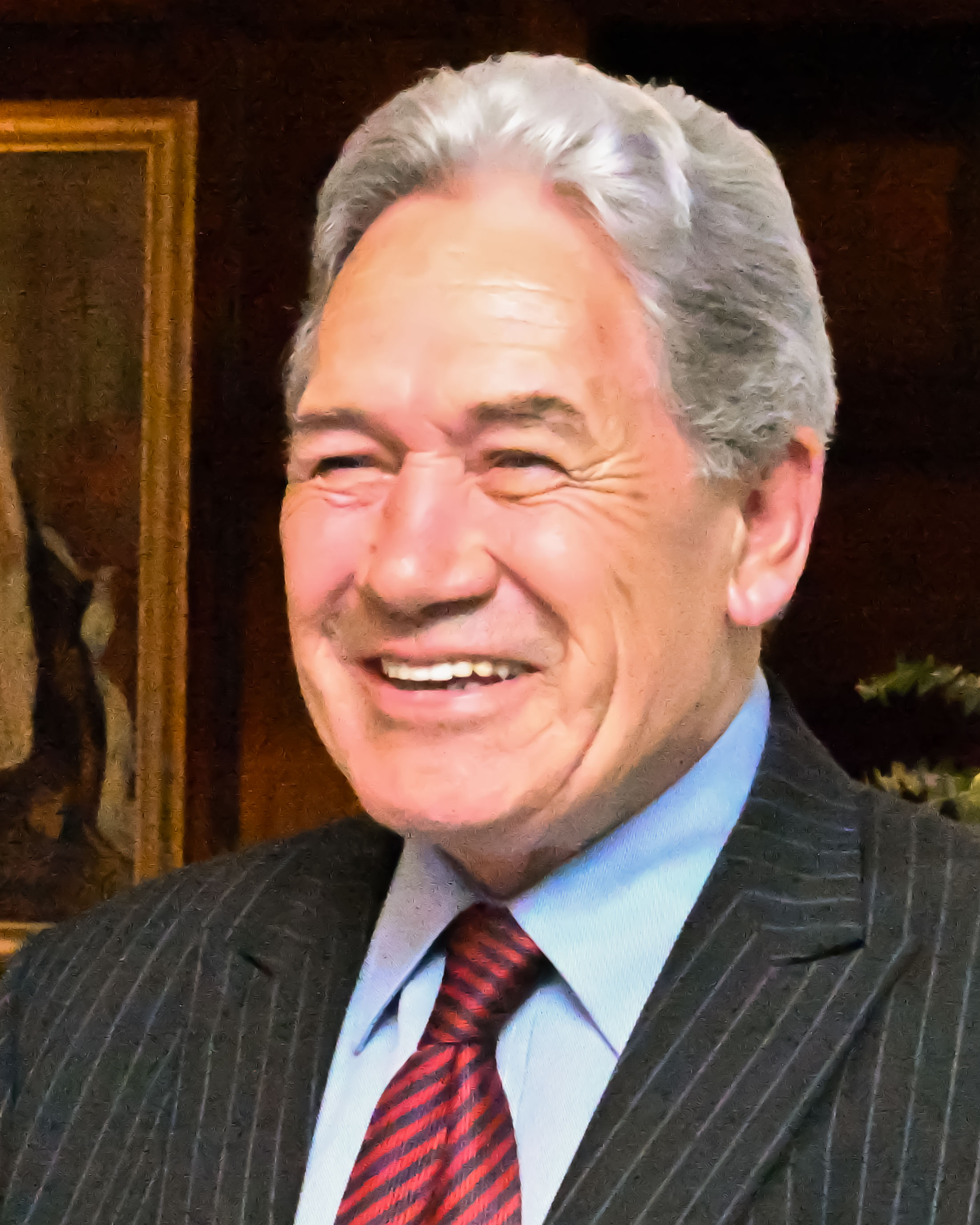
Cook Islands Prime Minister Mark Brown and New Zealand Foreign Minister Winston Peters.

Following the China partnership agreement dispute, NZ Foreign Minister Peters suggested that Cook Islands-New Zealand relations needed to be reset, and that a new agreement stating the "overall parameters and constraints of the free association model" needed to be signed. In response, Brown told ABC News on 3 April 2025 that the new agreement should reflect the fact that the Cook Islands had become more independent over the decades and should not "wind back the clock of colonialism." In response, a spokesperson for Peters said that Brown needed to make the case for Cook Islands independence to his people before proceeding with plans to seek further independence from New Zealand, stating, "Unlike Samoa, Tonga and Tuvalu, the Cook Islands is not a fully independent and sovereign state."

On 19 June, the New Zealand Government confirmed to the media that Foreign Minister Peters had suspended NZ$20 million worth of core sector support funding to the Cook Islands in early June 2025. This was done in retaliation for the Cook Islands government signing a partnership agreement with China without consulting New Zealand, per the requirements of their free association relationship. Cook Islands opposition leader Tina Browne expressed deep concern about the halting of New Zealand's aid contribution and sought answers from Prime Minister Brown. Cook Islands News editor Rashkeel Kumar said that the core sector funding would have usually gone to supporting the island state's health, education and tourism sectors. The Cook Islands Foreign Affairs and Immigration Ministry said there was a dispute between the two governments regarding the interpretation of the 2001 Joint Centenary Declaration (JCD), and that the Cook Islands and New Zealand had established a formal dialogue mechanism to resolve these disagreements. In response to New Zealand concerns about the lack of consultation, Brown countered that the Cook Islands was "not privy to or consulted on" any agreements that New Zealand might sign with China during NZ Prime Minister Christopher Luxon's visit to Beijing that week.

In mid July 2025, 1News reported that the New Zealand government would not be sending Prime Minister Luxon or Foreign Minister Peters to attend the 60th anniversary of the Cook Islands' constitution, scheduled for 4 August 2025. Instead, Governor-General Dame Cindy Kiro and a delegation of MPs will represent New Zealand at the anniversary event. 1News suggested this was due to the breakdown in bilateral relations caused by the Cook Islands not consulting New Zealand on its partnership agreement with China. In response to Brown's remarks defending the Cook Islands' partnership agreement with China, a spokesperson for MFAT called on Brown to test public support for independence from New Zealand via a referendum. In response, a spokesperson for the Office of the Cook Islands Prime Minister reiterated the Cook Island's commitment to its free association relationship with New Zealand.

The 60th anniversary celebrations were held at the National Auditorium at Rarotonga on 5 August 2025. The event was attended by Governor-General Kiro, Prime Minister Brown, the King's Representative Sir Tom Marsters, Lady Tuaine Marsters, and various political, religious and community leaders. Peters instead attended a Cook Islands community event in Glen Innes along with several Pasifika MPs including Minister for Pacific Peoples Shane Reti and Labour's deputy leader Carmel Sepuloni.

On 9 November 2025, the New Zealand government extended its suspension of NZ$29.8 million worth of funding to the Cook Islands over the next two financial years, citing a breakdown in trust and relations caused by the Cook Islands' partnership agreements with China. The Ministry of Foreign Affairs and Trade (MFAT) confirmed that NZ would continue to provide developmental assistance in other areas such as education, heath, governance, security and humanitarian support through NZ agencies and regional programmes. On 14 November, Cook Islands Prime Minister Brown told local media that he had requested a meeting with New Zealand Prime Minister Luxon and Foreign Minister Peters but that they had requested that the discussions be done by their officials. Brown also minimised the economic impact of the aid cuts, saying that the Cook Islands was able to cover the deficit due to its "strong economy, driven by tourism." He also reiterated the Cook Island's commitment to maintaining its Free Association relationship with New Zealand. In response, a spokesperson for Peters described Brown's vision of the New Zealand-Cook Islands relationship as "inconsistent" with the free association model.

=== Reconciliation in New Zealand, 2026–present ===
In mid-March 2026, Brown visited New Zealand. He spoke at a formal event at the Takina Events Centre in Wellington before travelling to Auckland to meet with Cook Islander New Zealanders. During his visit, Brown said that the bilateral relationship needed a "rethink." While Brown did not meet with Luxon during his visit, he and his officials met with Foreign Minister Peters and New Zealand officials at Peters' Auckland home. While the two parties did not reach an agreement on repairing the strained bilateral relationship, they issued a joint statement that the two governments would continue political dialogue on resolving bilateral disagreements. On 23 March, Brown addressed the Cook Islands diaspora in New Zealand, saying they helped "expand the borders" of the islands territory. He also announced new measures to support the diaspora including a government internship programme in Rarotonga, expanded access to an online births, marriages and deaths registry, and a plan to rollout Cook Islands stamp processing from mid-2027.

On 2 April 2026, Peters and Brown signed a defence and security declaration in Rarotonga. Peter also confirmed that New Zealand would resume about NZ$29.8 million in annual aid funding to the islands territory; repairing mended bilateral relations, which has been strained in 2025 by the Cook Islands signing a series of partnership agreements with China. The defence and security declaration ensures that New Zealand would be privy to similar deals with third countries in the future.

On 1 September 2026, the New Zealand and United States governments signed an agreement during the annual Pacific Islands Forum conference in Palau to jointly fund a project to upgrade a port at Omoka village on Penrhyn Atoll. This agreement was built on an earlier critical minerals agreement signed between the Cook Islands and the United States in February 2026. Under the agreement, the United States would contribute US$50 million to the port while New Zealand would contribute US$10 million.
