= Monarchy in the Cook Islands =

King of New Zealand
- Te Kīngi o Aotearoa (Māori)
- Coats of arms of New Zealand, the Cook Islands and Niue

Incumbent
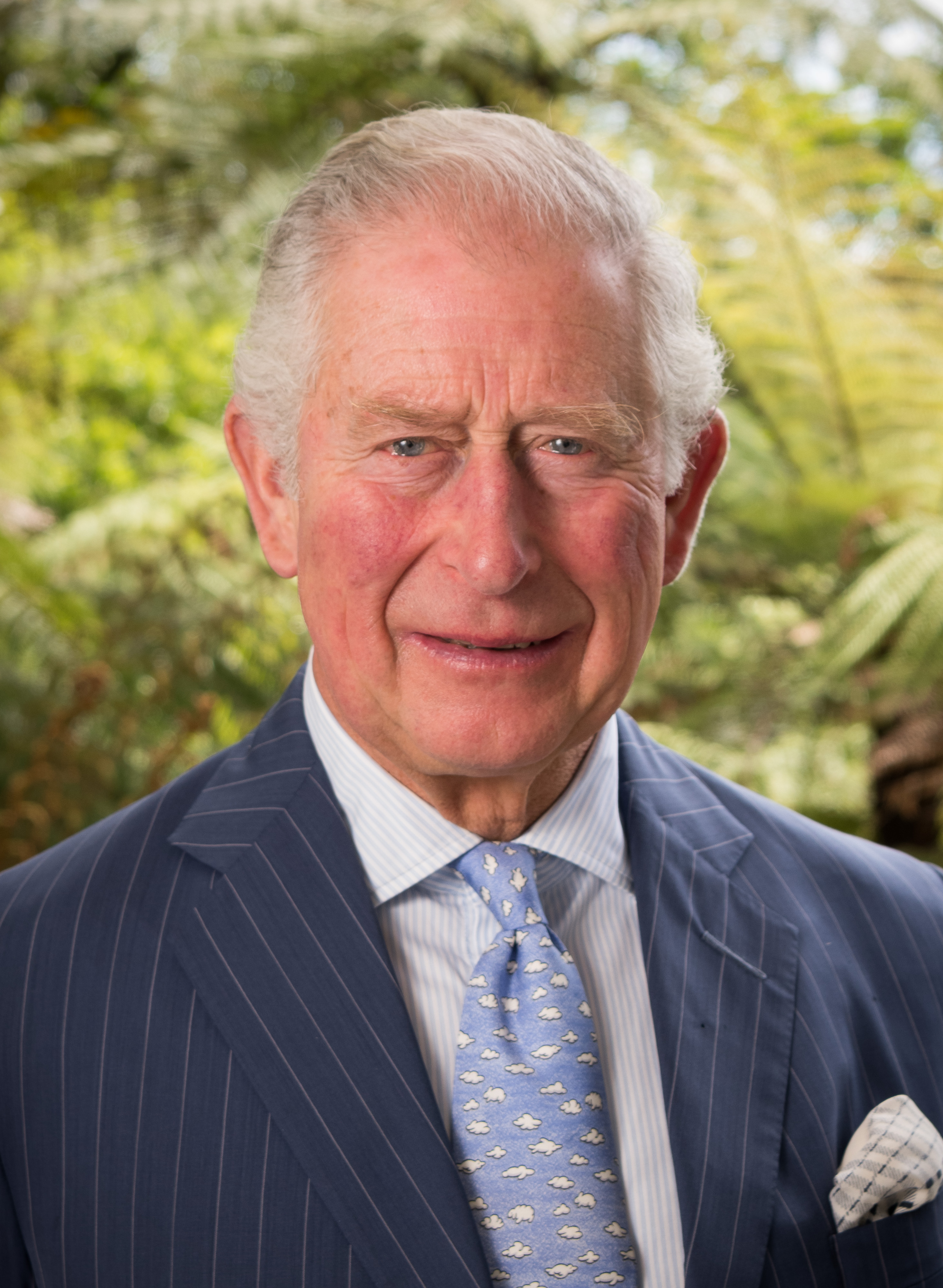
- Charles III; Tiāre te Tuatoru (Māori) since 8 September 2022

Details
- Style: His Majesty (Māori: Te Arikinui)
- Heir apparent: William, Prince of Wales

The Cook Islands are a constitutional monarchy within the Realm of New Zealand. Under the Cook Islands Constitution, the Sovereign in Right of New Zealand (currently Charles III) has been Head of State of the Cook Islands since 4 August 1965. The Sovereign is represented by the King's Representative; as such, the King is the de jure head of state, holding several powers that are his alone, while the King's Representative is sometimes referred to as the de facto head of state. The viceregal position is currently held by Tom Marsters.

== History ==
In 1965 Queen Elizabeth II became Head of State of the Cook Islands when the country obtained a position of free-association with New Zealand.

Article 2 of the Cook Islands Constitution states that "Her Majesty the Queen in Right of New Zealand shall be the Head of State of the Cook Islands." The expression "in Right of New Zealand" refers directly to the constitutional concept of the "Realm of New Zealand," as described in the 1983 Letters Patent Constituting the Office of Governor-General of New Zealand, approved by the Cook Islands after consultation with New Zealand. In clause 1, the Realm of New Zealand is defined as including New Zealand, the self-governing state of the Cook Islands, the self-governing state of Niue, Tokelau and the Ross Dependency.

Thus, Elizabeth II, by virtue of being Head of State of her entire Realm of New Zealand, as described in the Letters Patent, was also Head of State of that part of her Realm of New Zealand referred to in the Letters Patent as "the self-governing state of the Cook Islands."

The New Zealand - Cook Islands Joint Centenary Declaration states that:

Her Majesty the Queen as Head of State of the Cook Islands is advised exclusively by Her Cook Islands Ministers in matters relating to the Cook Islands... In all matters affecting the Realm of New Zealand, of which the Cook Islands and New Zealand are part, there will be close consultation between the Signatories.

On the passing of Elizabeth II on 8 September 2022, her son King Charles III immediately succeeded her to become Head of State of the Cook Islands via its free-association with New Zealand.

== Title ==
The King's official title is: King Charles the Third, By the Grace of God King of New Zealand and of His Other Realms and Territories, Head of the Commonwealth, Defender of the Faith.

== Succession ==
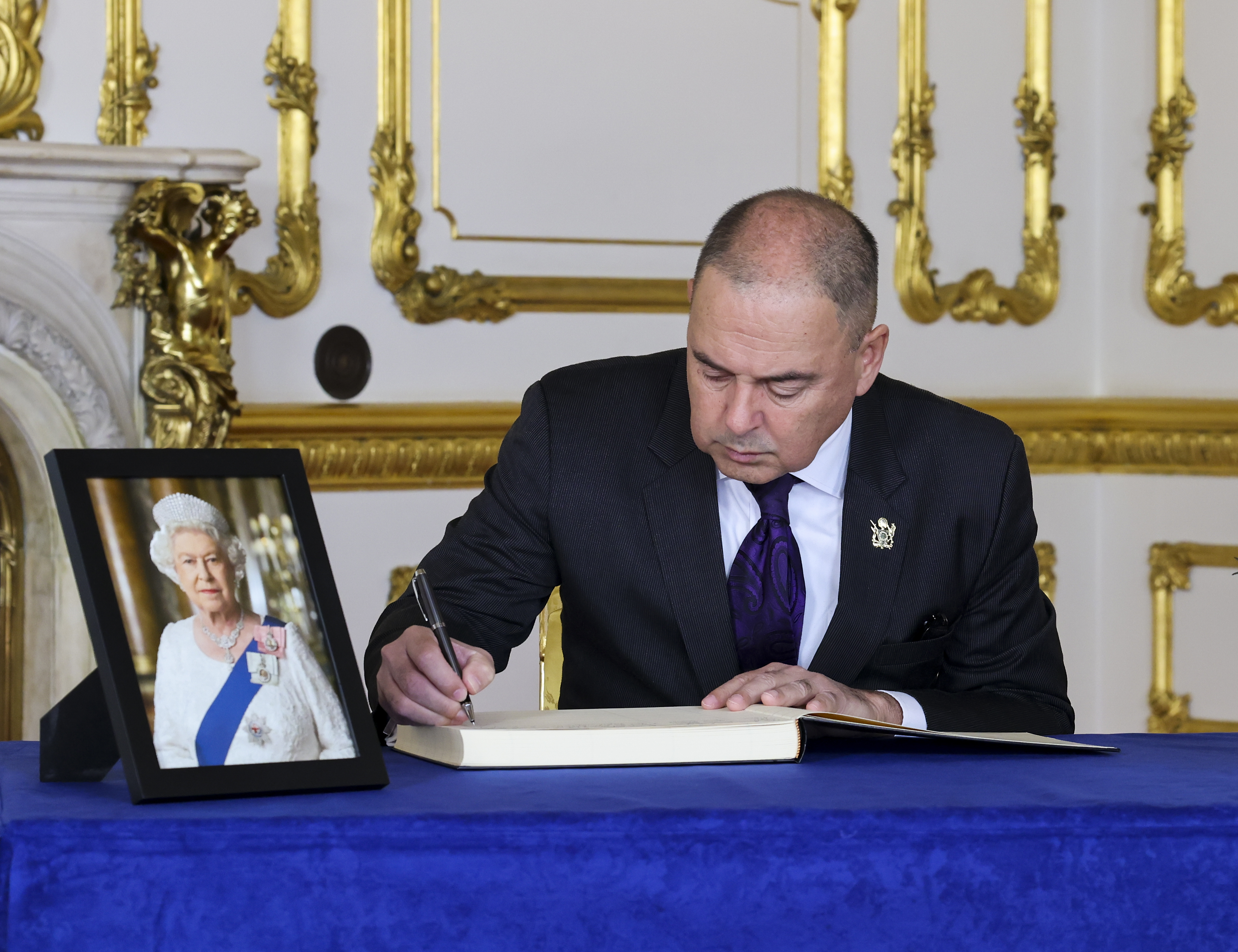
Prime Minister Mark Brown signing the book of condolences in memory of Queen Elizabeth II at Lancaster House, 17 September 2022

Royal succession is governed by the Royal Succession Act 2013. This legislation lays out the rules that the Monarch cannot be a Roman Catholic, and must be in communion with the Church of England upon ascending the throne.

The heir apparent is Charles III's eldest son, William, Prince of Wales.

== Sovereign's Representative ==
The Queen's Representative is the representative of the Queen of New Zealand. There is a separate representative of the New Zealand Government, and of the Cook Islands in New Zealand.

— Professor Noel Cox

The Monarch's constitutional roles in the Cook Islands have been almost entirely delegated to the Sovereign's Representative. Royal assent and proclamation are required for all acts of Parliament; usually granted by the Sovereign's Representative.

Originally the viceregal representative was titled as High Commissioner and was appointed by the Governor-General of New Zealand on the recommendation of the minister in the New Zealand Government who was deemed responsible for matters relating to the Cook Islands, and after consultation with the Premier of the Cook Islands. In the early 1980s, the Cook Island Constitution was amended so that the words "Queen's Representative" were substituted for the word "High Commissioner," and the words "Prime Minister" were substituted for the word "Premier." Further, the 1981 Constitution Amendment decreed that the King's representative was appointed directly by the Monarch; not the Governor-General of New Zealand. The text states that "[there] shall be a representative of Her Majesty the Queen in the Cook Islands, to be known as the Queen's Representative [to be appointed] by Her Majesty the Queen..."

Flag of the Sovereign's Representative featuring the Crown

Article 5 of the Constitution states that the Queen's Representative is to act on the advice of her Cook Islands Ministers: "The Queen's Representative in the performance of his functions as the representative of Her Majesty the Queen shall act on the advice of Cabinet, the Prime Minister, or the appropriate Minister as the case may be..."

It is indeed my honour to be here today to exercise the prerogative of His Majesty King Charles III, Head of State of the Cook Islands to open this Eighteenth Parliament of the Cook Islands.

— King's Representative Tom Marsters, 2023

Over the Realm of New Zealand, the Letters Patent established the office of the Governor-General, and provide that the Governor-General is "[the Queen's] representative in [the] Realm of New Zealand" who may exercise his or her powers and authorities "without prejudice to the office, powers, or authorities of any other person who has been or may be appointed to represent [Her Majesty] in any part of [her] Realm of New Zealand and to exercise powers and authorities on [her] behalf." However, the relationship between the Governor-General of New Zealand and the Queen's Representative is quite different. Under the Cook Islands' Constitution, executive power is "vested in Her Majesty the Queen in right of New Zealand... the executive authority of the Cook Islands may be exercised on behalf of Her Majesty by the Queen's Representative either directly or through officers subordinate to him. This leaves the Governor-General with only an indirect constitutional role in the form of the defence and external affairs prerogatives, arising from the Governor-General's constitutional position in terms of the Realm as a whole. Any viceregal powers and responsibilities in the Cook Islands are vested in the Sovereign's Representative, leaving the Governor-General with no substantive role in relation to the territory.

== Royal symbols ==
References to the monarch are commonplace in public life in the Cook Islands. There are references to the Crown in legal documents, oaths of office taken by the King's Representative, members of Parliament and judges of the High Court, and prescriptions in the constitution require allegiance to be sworn to the reigning sovereign as the Head of State of the Cook Islands.

Unlike in the United Kingdom, the King's Official Birthday is a public holiday on the first Monday in June. Elizabeth II's portrait continues to appear on the obverse of coins, and all banknotes feature the portrait of Elizabeth II as the watermark until new currency is issued with Charles III's portrait. However, only the $20 banknote bears her image as the main feature (Cook Islands use the New Zealand dollar).

Elizabeth II undertook a royal tour of the Cook Islands between 28 January and 29 January 1974.

== List of monarchs ==
The following table lists the monarchs who have reigned over the Cook Islands since it was annexed by Britain on 9 October 1900, through its incorporation into the boundaries of the colony of New Zealand on 11 June 1901, and since achieving self-government on 4 August 1965.

Portrait	Regnal name (Birth–Death)	Reign		Full name	Consort	House
Portrait	Regnal name (Birth–Death)	Start	End	Full name	Consort	House
As a British colony
	Victoria (1819–1901)	9 October 1900 (Note: The date the Cook Islands were annexed as a British territory.)	22 January 1901	Alexandrina Victoria	Widowed	Hanover
	Edward VII (1841–1910)	22 January 1901	11 June 1901	Albert Edward	Alexandra of Denmark	Saxe-Coburg and Gotha
As a New Zealand colony
	Edward VII (1841–1910)	11 June 1901	6 May 1910	Albert Edward	Alexandra of Denmark	Saxe-Coburg and Gotha
	George V (1865–1936)	6 May 1910	20 January 1936	George Frederick Ernest Albert	Mary of Teck	Windsor (Note: Saxe-Coburg and Gotha until 1917, and Windsor thereafter.)
	Edward VIII (1894–1972)	20 January 1936	11 December 1936	Edward Albert Christian George Andrew Patrick David	None	Windsor
	George VI (1895–1952)	11 December 1936	6 February 1952	Albert Frederick Arthur George	Elizabeth Bowes-Lyon	Windsor
	Elizabeth II (1926–2022)	6 February 1952	4 August 1965	Elizabeth Alexandra Mary	Philip Mountbatten	Windsor
As a self-governing country
	Elizabeth II (1926–2022)	4 August 1965	8 September 2022	Elizabeth Alexandra Mary	Philip Mountbatten	Windsor
	Elizabeth II (1926–2022)	Queen's Representatives (from 1975): Sir Gaven Donne, Sir Graham Speight (acting), Sir Tangaroa Tangaroa, Sir Apenera Short, Laurence Greig (acting), Sir Frederick Tutu Goodwin, Sir Tom Marsters				
	Elizabeth II (1926–2022)	Premiers (1965-1981) / Prime Ministers (from 1981): Albert Henry, Sir Thomas Davis, Sir Pupuke Robati, Sir Geoffrey Henry, Joe Williams, Sir Terepai Maoate, Robert Woonton, Jim Marurai, Henry Puna, Mark Brown				
	Charles III (born 1948)	8 September 2022	present	Charles Philip Arthur George	Camilla Shand	Windsor
	Charles III (born 1948)	King's Representatives: Sir Tom Marsters				
	Charles III (born 1948)	Prime ministers: Mark Brown				

== See also ==
- List of current non-sovereign monarchs#Cook Islands
- Kingdom of Rarotonga
- Monarchy in New Zealand
- Monarchy of the United Kingdom
