= History of the Cook Islands =

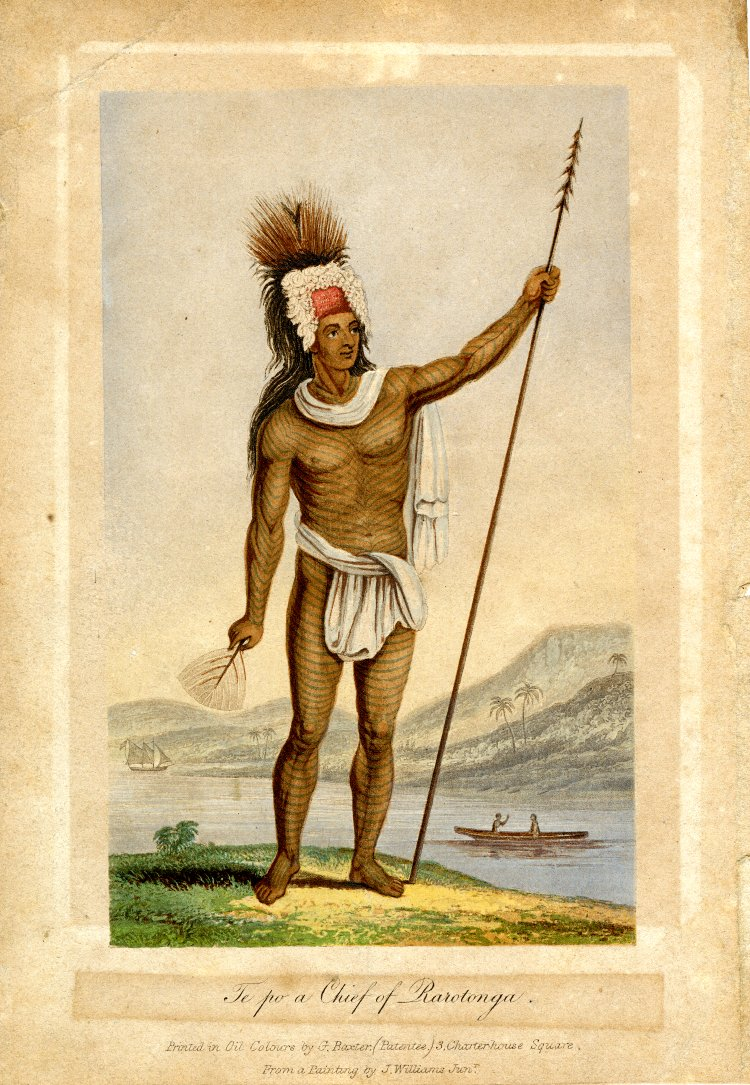
Pa te Pou Ariki, Chief of the Takitumu tribe, Rarotonga (c. 1837)

The Cook Islands are named after Captain James Cook, who visited the islands in 1773 and 1777, although Spanish navigator Alvaro de Mendaña was the first European to reach the islands in 1595. The Cook Islands became aligned to the United Kingdom in 1890, largely because of the fear of British residents that France might occupy the islands as it already had Tahiti.

By 1900, the islands were annexed as British territory. In 1901, the islands were included within the boundaries of the Colony of New Zealand.

The Cook Islands contain 15 islands in the group spread over a vast area in the South Pacific. The majority of islands are low coral atolls in the Northern Group, with Rarotonga, a volcanic island in the Southern Group, as the main administration and government centre. The most spoken Cook Islands language is Rarotongan Māori. Different dialects of Cook Islands Maori are spoken on the other islands.

== Polynesian settlement ==
It is thought that the Cook Islands was settled around 450 CE. Early settlements suggest that the settlers migrated from the Marquesas, to the northeast of the Cooks. The Cook Islands continue to hold important connections with French Polynesia, and this is generally found in the two countries' culture, tradition and language. It is also thought that early settlers landed in Rarotonga at (Takitumu). There are notable historic epics of great warriors who travel between the islands of eastern Polynesia for a wide variety of reasons. The purpose of these missions is still unclear but recent research indicates that large to small groups often fled their island due to local wars being forced upon them. For each group to travel and to survive, they would normally rely on a warrior to lead them. Outstanding warriors are still mentioned in the countries' traditions and stories.

These arrivals are evidenced by an older road in Toi, the Ara Metua, which runs around most of Rarotonga, and is believed to be at least 1200 years old. This 29 km (18 mi) long, paved road is a considerable achievement of ancient engineering, possibly unsurpassed elsewhere in Polynesia. The islands of Manihiki and Rakahanga trace their origins to the arrival of Toa Nui, a warrior from the Puaikura tribe of Rarotonga, and Tepaeru, a high-ranking woman from the Takitumu or Te-Au-O-Tonga tribes of Rarotonga. Tongareva was settled by an ancestor from Rakahanga called Mahuta and an Aitutaki Ariki & Chief Taruia, and possibly a group from Tahiti. The remainder of the northern islands, Pukapuka (Te Ulu O Te Watu) was probably settled by expeditions from Samoa.

== Early European contact ==
Spanish ships visited the islands in the 16th century; the first written record of contact between Europeans and the native inhabitants of the Cook Islands came with the sighting of Pukapuka by Spanish sailor Álvaro de Mendaña in 1595, who called it San Bernardo (Saint Bernard). Portuguese-Spaniard Pedro Fernández de Quirós made the first recorded European landing in the islands when he set foot on Rakahanga in 1606, calling it Gente Hermosa (Beautiful People).

British navigator Captain James Cook arrived in 1773 and 1777. Cook named the islands the 'Hervey Islands' to honour a British Lord of the Admiralty. Half a century later, the Russian Baltic German Admiral Adam Johann von Krusenstern published the Atlas de l'Ocean Pacifique, in which he renamed the islands the Cook Islands to honour Cook. Captain Cook navigated and mapped much of the group. Surprisingly, Cook never sighted the largest island, Rarotonga, and the only island that he personally set foot on was the tiny, uninhabited Palmerston Atoll.

In 1813, Captain Theodore Walker of the colonial brig Endeavour made the first official sighting of the island Rarotonga.

The first recorded landing by Europeans on Rarotonga was in 1814 by the Cumberland; trouble broke out between the sailors and the Islanders and many were killed on both sides.

=== Missionary activity ===
Papeiha, a Christian convert from Bora Bora, conducted evangelising missions to Aitutaki in 1821 and to Rarotonga in 1823.

The London Missionary Society (LMS) established a presence on Rarotonga in 1827, with three mission stations established along with churches and schools. The missionaries worked with the ariki (paramount chiefs) to promulgate basic law codes and attempt to regulate interacts between islanders and visiting Europeans, mostly whalers. This included barring Europeans from staying overnight on the island and barring Maori from staying overnight on European ships.

The exclusion policy towards non-missionary Europeans was abandoned by the ariki in the 1850s, when European traders began to establish themselves. In 1865 a formal petition was drafted seeking the creation of a British protectorate, following concerns by the ariki about French influence; the LMS had cultivated an anti-Catholic sentiment on Rarotonga. The Foreign Office refused the request after finding the islanders' claims about French activities were overstated.

In 1881, a British consulate was established on Rarotonga following a petition by fifteen European merchants and planters, with Charles E. Goodman as the inaugural consul. By this time there was also a Chinese population on Rarotonga.

=== Blackbirding ===
Brutal Peruvian slave traders, known as blackbirders, took a terrible toll on the islands of the Northern Group in 1862 and 1863. At first, the traders may have genuinely operated as labour recruiters, but they quickly turned to subterfuge and outright kidnapping to round up their human cargo. The Cook Islands was not the only island group visited by the traders, but Penrhyn Atoll was their first port of call and it has been estimated that three-quarters of the population was taken to Callao, Peru. Rakahanga and Pukapuka also suffered tremendous losses.

== British protectorate and territory ==
In the 1880s there was a significant expansion in merchant activity in the islands and the illegal importation of alcohol, which prompted renewed calls for British assistance to enforce local laws. At the same time, the colonial government of New Zealand sought to increase its influence in the islands, given their strategic location between Auckland and the planned Panama Canal. In 1885, Makea Takau Ariki – a prominent ariki on Rarotonga – met with New Zealand native affairs minister John Ballance and discussed the potential incorporation of the Cook Islands into New Zealand.

In May 1888, Makea petitioned the British government for protection, citing the threat of a French invasion. Although her petition was not authorised by the other ariki, the Colonial Office accepted her petition. On 27 September 1888, acting British vice-consul Richard Exham proclaimed a British protectorate over the southern Cook Islands. A further proclamation was made by Captain Edmund Bourke of HMS Hyacinth four weeks later, with the express permission of the ariki on each of the inhabited islands. The Colonial Office later found that Bourke's proclamation had inadvertently asserted the annexation of the Cook Islands rather than the establishment of a protectorate, which was rectified at a later date.

In 1890, former New Zealand MP Frederick Moss was appointed as the first official British resident on Rarotonga. Similar to the Australian colonies' subsidy of the administration of British New Guinea, the resident's salary was paid by the government of New Zealand and he was made subordinate to the Governor of New Zealand. The terms of the protectorate were that local laws would continue in force, but any new legislation would be countersigned by the resident and made subject to disallowance of the governor.

On 8–9 October 1900, seven instruments of cession of Rarotonga and other islands were signed by their chiefs and people, and a British proclamation issued at the same time accepted the cessions, the islands being declared parts of Her Britannic Majesty's dominions. These instruments did not include Aitutaki. It appears that, though the inhabitants regarded themselves as British subjects, the Crown's title was uncertain, and the island was formally annexed by Proclamation dated 9 October 1900. The islands were included within the boundaries of the Colony of New Zealand in 1901 by Order in Council under the Colonial Boundaries Act, 1895 of the United Kingdom. The boundary change became effective on 11 June 1901, and the Cook Islands have had a formal relationship with New Zealand since that time.

== Self-government ==
In 1962 New Zealand asked the Cook Islands legislature to vote on four options for the future: independence, self-government, integration into New Zealand, or integration into a larger Polynesian federation. The legislature decided upon self-government. Following elections in 1965, the Cook Islands transitioned to become a self-governing territory in free association with New Zealand. This arrangement left the Cook Islands politically independent, but officially remaining under New Zealand sovereignty. This political transition was approved by the United Nations. Despite this status change, the islands remained financially dependent on New Zealand, and New Zealand believed that a failure of the free association agreement would lead to integration rather than full independence.

New Zealand is tasked with overseeing the country's foreign relations and defense. The Cook Islands, Niue, and New Zealand (with its territories: Tokelau and the Ross Dependency) make up the Realm of New Zealand.

After achieving autonomy in 1965, the Cook Islands elected Albert Henry of the Cook Islands Party as their first Prime Minister. He led the country until 1978 when he was accused of vote-rigging. He was succeeded by Tom Davis of the Democratic Party.

On 11 June 1980, the United States signed a treaty with the Cook Islands specifying the maritime border between the Cook Islands and American Samoa and also relinquishing the US claim to the islands of Penrhyn, Pukapuka, Manihiki, and Rakahanga. In 1990, the Cook Islands signed a treaty with France which delimited the maritime boundary between the Cook Islands and French Polynesia.

On June 13, 2008, a small majority of members of the House of Ariki attempted a coup, claiming to dissolve the elected government and to take control of the country's leadership. "Basically we are dissolving the leadership, the prime minister and the deputy prime minister and the ministers," chief Makea Vakatini Joseph Ariki explained. The Cook Islands Herald suggested that the ariki were attempting thereby to regain some of their traditional prestige or mana. Prime Minister Jim Marurai described the take-over move as "ill-founded and nonsensical". By June 23, the situation appeared to have normalised, with members of the House of Ariki accepting to return to their regular duties.

== Gallery ==
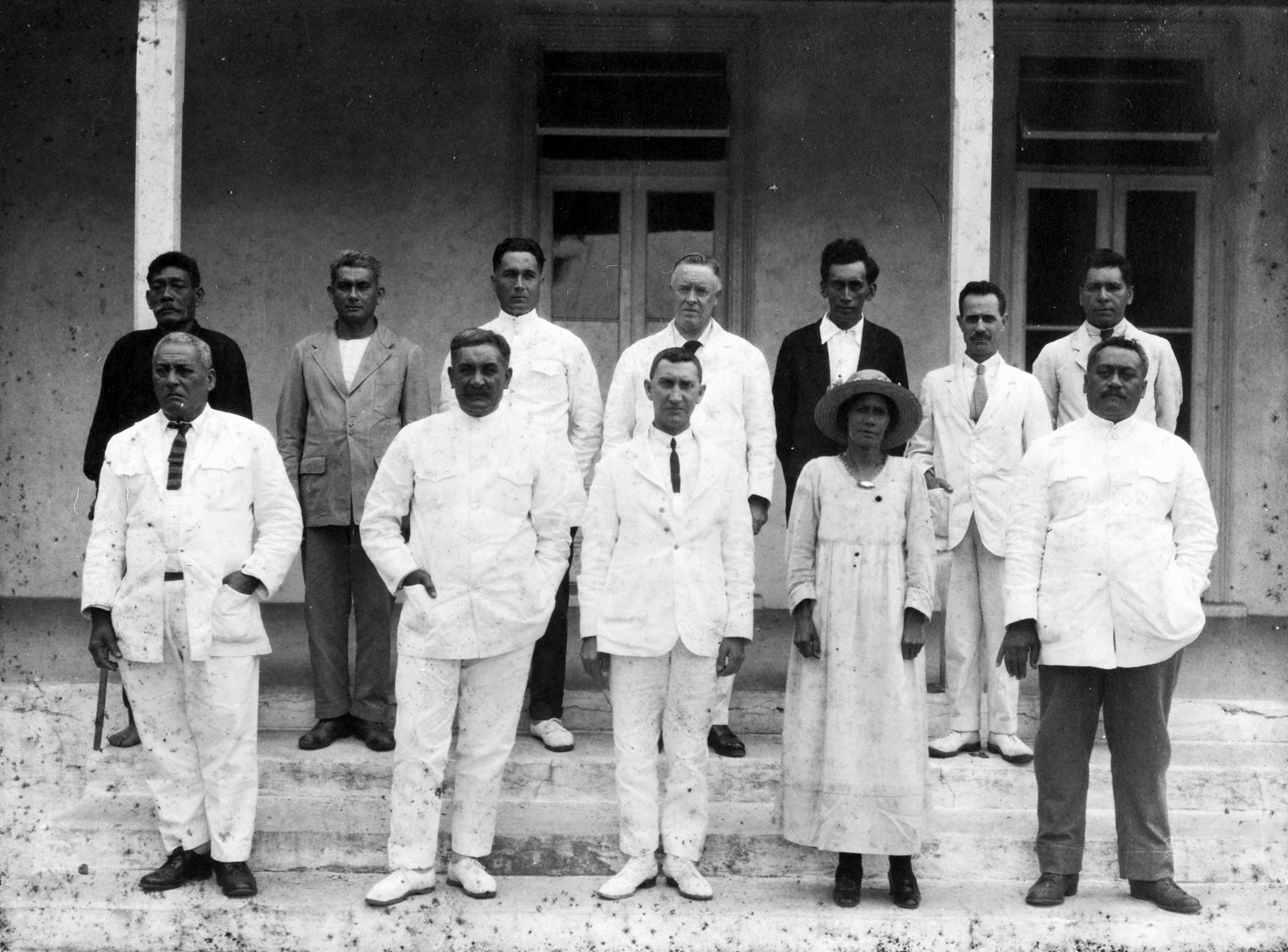
Rarotonga Island Council (1923–1925)

The Kingdom of Rarotonga flag (1888–1893)

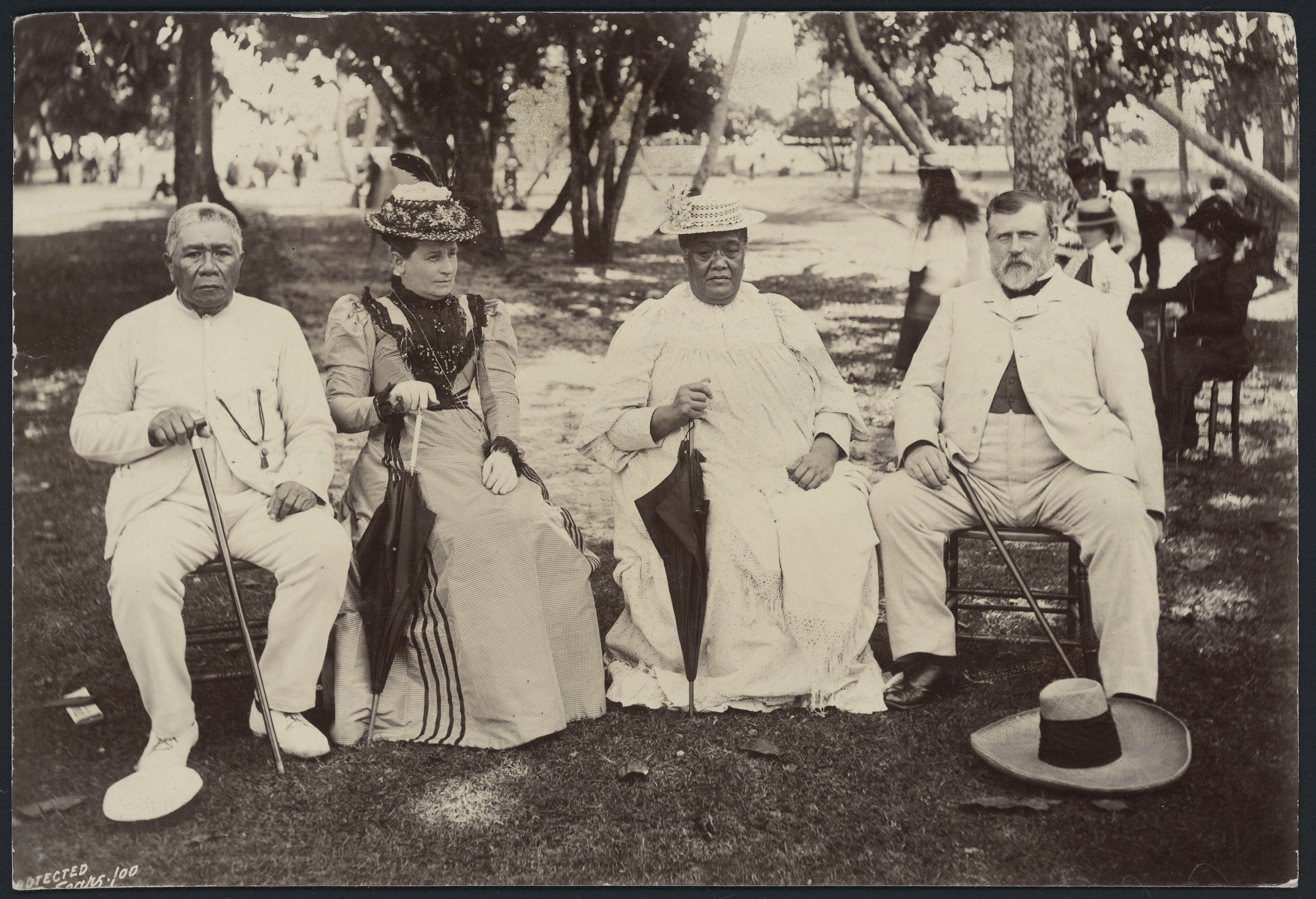
Ngamaru Rongotini Ariki, Mrs Seddon, Makea Takau Ariki, Mr Seddon (1900)

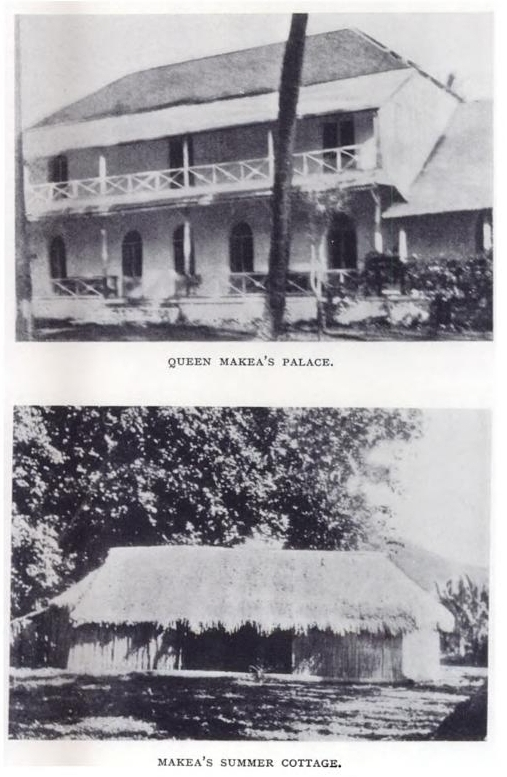
Queen Makea's Palace & Makea's Summer Cottage (1908)

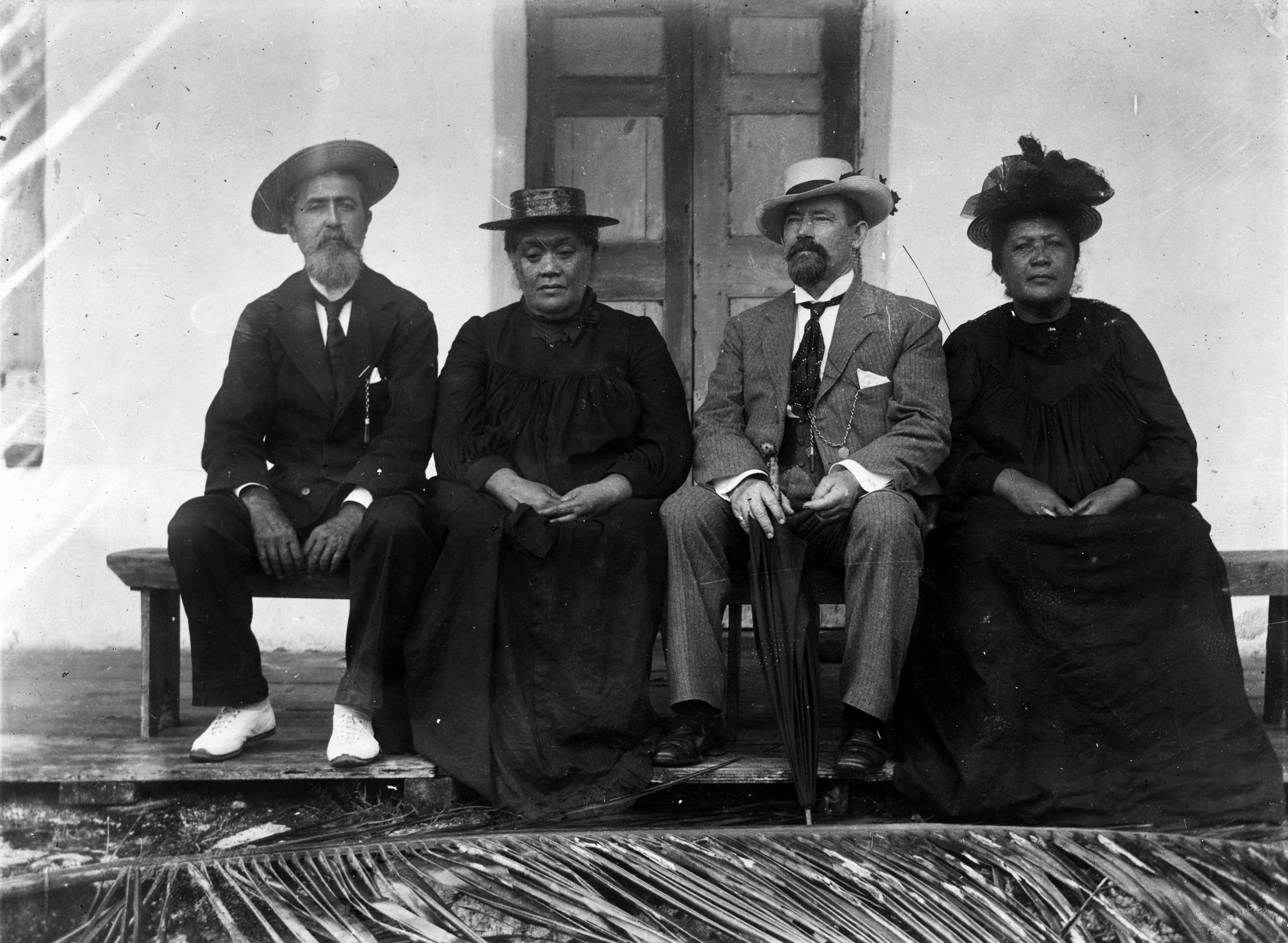
Pa Maretu Ariki, Makea Takau Ariki, Charles H. Mills, Tinomana Mereana Ariki (1903)

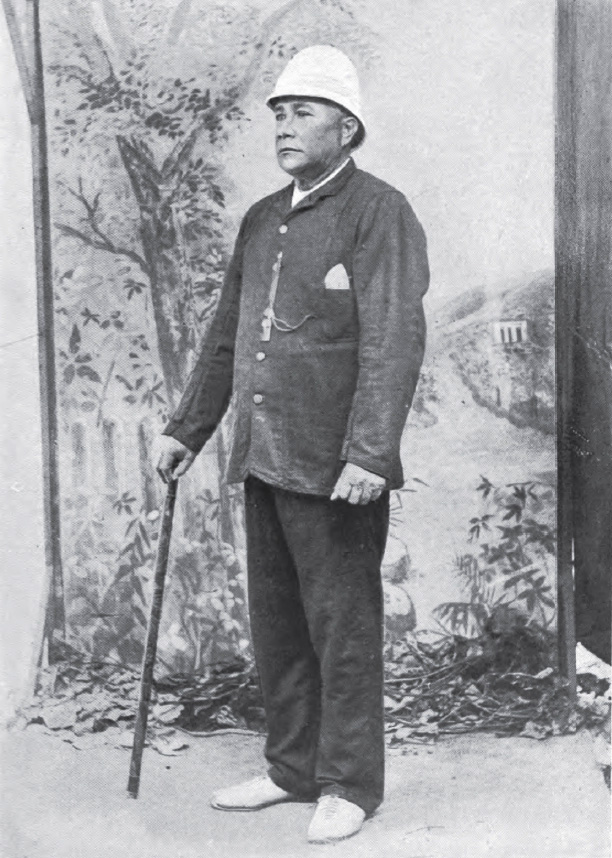
Prince Ngamaru the Ariki of Atiu (1885)

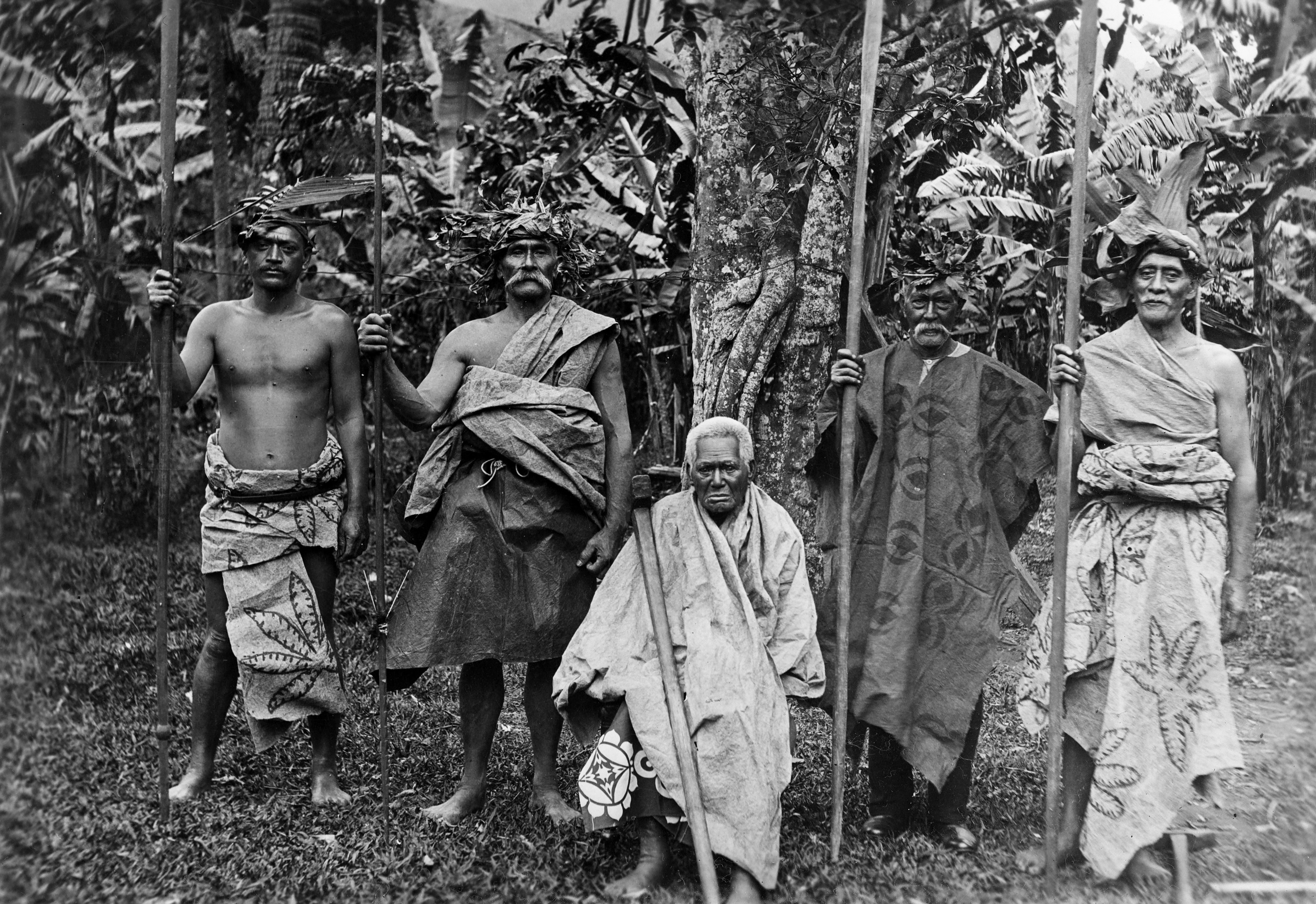
Makea Karika Tavake Ariki and elders of the Karika tribe, Rarotonga (1888–1910)

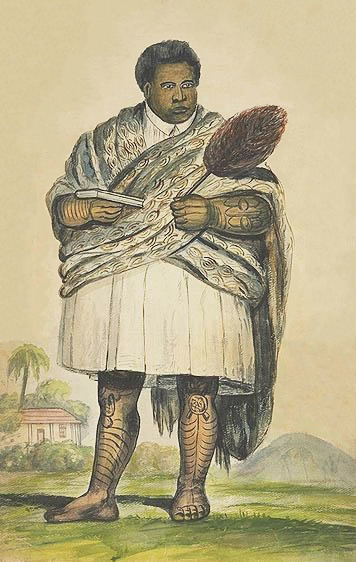
Makea Pori Ariki, Chief of Te-au-o-tonga, Rarotonga (1837)

== Timeline ==
1595 — Spaniard Álvaro de Mendaña de Neira is the first European to sight the islands.

1606 — Portuguese-Spaniard Pedro Fernández de Quirós makes the first recorded European landing in the islands when he sets foot on Rakahanga.

1773 — Captain James Cook explores the islands and names them the Hervey Islands. Fifty years later they are renamed in his honour by Russian Admiral Adam Johann von Krusenstern.

1821 — English and Tahitian missionaries land in Aitutaki, become the first non-Polynesian settlers.

1823 — English missionary John Williams lands in Rarotonga, converting Makea Pori Ariki to Christianity.

1858 — The Cook Islands become united as a state, the Kingdom of Rarotonga.

1862 — Peruvian slave traders take a terrible toll on the islands of Penrhyn, Rakahanga and Pukapuka in 1862 and 1863.

1888 — Cook Islands are proclaimed a British protectorate and a single federal parliament is established.

1900 — The Cook Islands are ceded to the United Kingdom as British territory, except for Aitutaki which was annexed by the United Kingdom at the same time.

1901 — The boundaries of the Colony of New Zealand are extended by the United Kingdom to include the Cook Islands.

1924 — The All Black Invincibles stop in Rarotonga on their way to the United Kingdom and play a friendly match against a scratch Rarotongan team.

1946 — Legislative Council is established. For the first time since 1912, the territory has direct representation.

1957 — Legislative Council is reorganized as the Legislative Assembly.

1965 — The Cook Islands become a self-governing territory in free association with New Zealand. Albert Henry, leader of the Cook Islands Party, is elected as the territory's first prime minister.

1974 — Albert Henry is knighted by Queen Elizabeth II

1979 — Sir Albert Henry is found guilty of electoral fraud and stripped of his premiership and his knighthood. Tom Davis becomes Premier.

1980 — Cook Islands – United States Maritime Boundary Treaty establishes the Cook Islands – American Samoa boundary

1981 — Constitution is amended. Legislative Assembly is renamed Parliament, which grows from 22 to 24 seats, and the parliamentary term is extended from four to five years. Tom Davis is knighted.

1984 — The country's first coalition government, between Sir Thomas and Geoffrey Henry, is signed in the lead up to hosting regional Mini Games in 1985. Shifting coalitions saw ten years of political instability. At one stage, all but two MPs were in government.

1985 — Rarotonga Treaty is opened for signing in the Cook Islands, creating a nuclear-free zone in the South Pacific.

1986 — In January 1986, following the rift between New Zealand and the US in respect of the ANZUS security arrangements Prime Minister Tom Davis declared the Cook Islands a neutral country, because he considered that New Zealand (which has control over the islands' defence and foreign policy) was no longer in a position to defend the islands. The proclamation of neutrality meant that the Cook Islands would not enter into a military relationship with any foreign power, and, in particular, would prohibit visits by US warships. Visits by US naval vessels were allowed to resume by Henry's Government.

1990 — Cook Islands – France Maritime Delimitation Agreement establishes the Cook Islands–French Polynesia boundary

1991 — The Cook Islands signed a treaty of friendship and co-operation with France, covering economic development, trade and surveillance of the islands' EEZ. The establishment of closer relations with France was widely regarded as an expression of the Cook Islands' Government's dissatisfaction with existing arrangements with New Zealand which was no longer in a position to defend the Cook Islands.

1995 — The French Government resumed its programme of nuclear-weapons testing at Mururoa Atoll in September 1995 upsetting the Cook Islands. New Prime Minister Geoffrey Henry was fiercely critical of the decision and dispatched a vaka (traditional voyaging canoe) with a crew of Cook Islands' traditional warriors to protest near the test site. The tests were concluded in January 1996 and a moratorium was placed on future testing by the French government.

1997 — Full diplomatic relations established with the People's Republic of China.

1997 — In November, Cyclone Martin in Manihiki kills at least six people; 80% of buildings are damaged and the black pearl industry suffered severe losses.

1999 — A second era of political instability begins, starting with five different coalitions in less than nine months, and at least as many since then.

2000 — Full diplomatic relations concluded with France.

2002 — Prime Minister Terepai Maoate is ousted from government following second vote of no-confidence in his leadership.

2004 — Prime Minister Robert Woonton visits China; Chinese Premier Wen Jiabao grants $16 million in development aid.

2006 — Parliamentary elections held. The Democratic Party keeps majority of seats in parliament, but is unable to command a majority for confidence, forcing a coalition with breakaway MPs who left, then rejoined the "Demos".

2008 — Pacific Island nations imposed a series of measures aimed at halting overfishing.

== See also ==
- Cook Islands mythology
- Postage stamps and postal history of the Cook Islands

== Sources ==
- Gilson, R. P. (1955). "Negotiations leading to British intervention in Rarotonga (Cook Islands)". Historical Studies: Australia and New Zealand. 7 (25): 62–80. doi:10.1080/10314615508595041.
