= Heta Hingston =

New Zealand lawyer and jurist (1938–2020)

Heta Hingston QSO
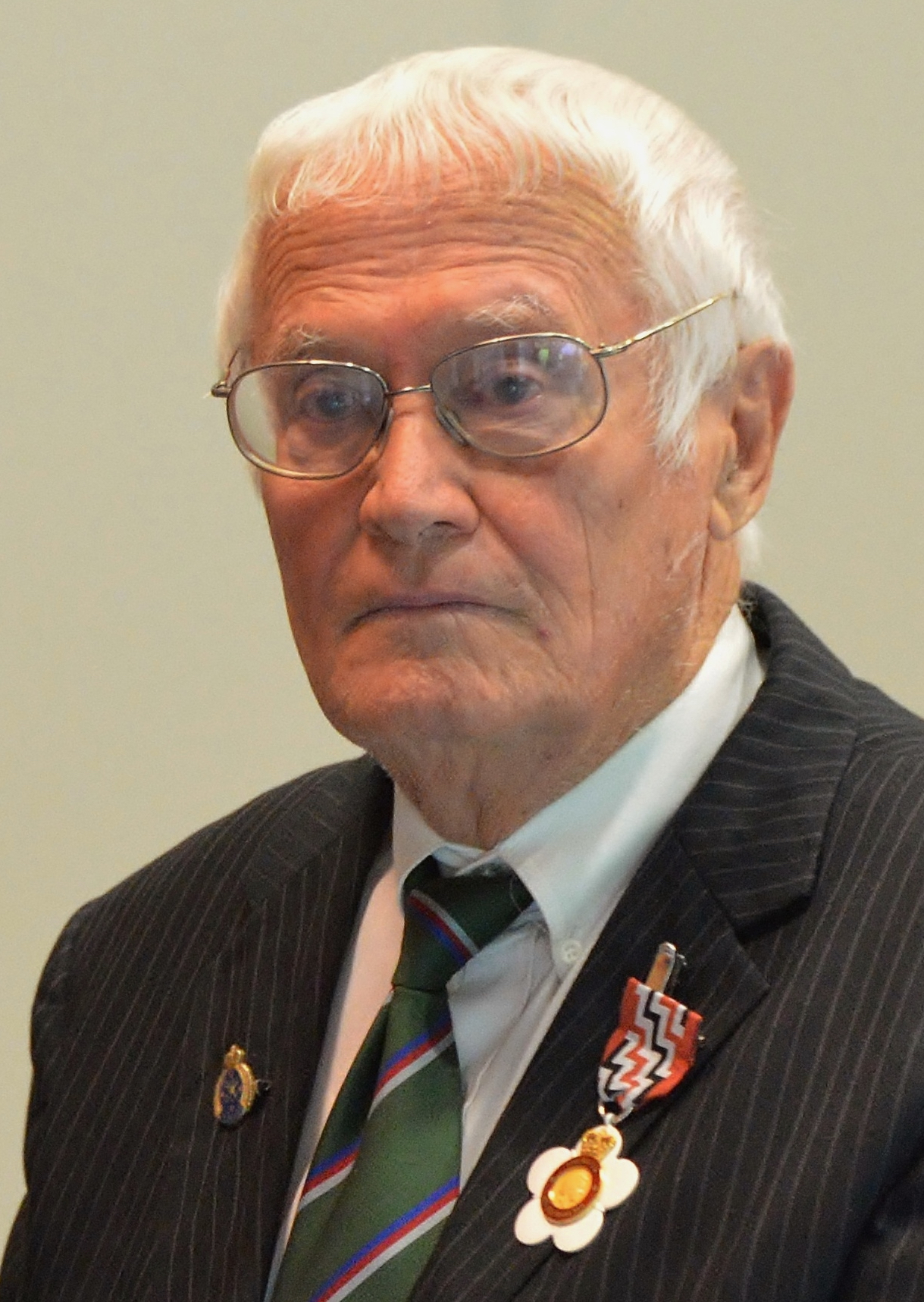
- Hingston in 2016

Chief Justice of the High Court of Niue
- In office 1982–2010
- Preceded by: Gaven Donne
- Succeeded by: Patrick Savage

Judge of the Māori Land Court
- In office 1984–1999

Judge of the High Court of the Cook Islands and the Cook Islands Court of Appeal
- In office 2000–2013

Personal details
- Born: 8 August 1938 Rotorua, New Zealand
- Died: 9 August 2020 (aged 82) Rotorua
- Education: Rotorua Boys' High School
- Alma mater: Victoria University of Wellington
- Occupation: Lawyer and jurist
- Military career
- Allegiance: NZL
- Service: New Zealand Army
- Service years: 1957—1959; 1961—1963
- Unit: Royal New Zealand Infantry Regiment
- Active duty: Malayan Emergency

Heta Kenneth Hingston QSO (8 August 1938 – 9 August 2020) was a New Zealand lawyer and jurist. He served as a judge of the Māori Land Court from 1984 to 1999, as Chief Justice of the High Court of Niue from 1978 until 2010, and as a judge of the High Court of the Cook Islands and the Cook Islands Court of Appeal between 2000 and 2013.

== Early life ==
Hingston was born in Rotorua and educated at Horohoro Native School, Whangamarino Primary, Rotorua Boys' High School and St Stephen's College. At the age of 18 he was conscripted into the New Zealand Army, and served in Malaya as part of the Royal New Zealand Infantry Regiment from 1957 to 1959 and again from 1961 to 1963.

Hingston later attended Victoria University of Wellington, and graduated with an LLB in 1969. While studying he worked as a legal assistant for the New Zealand Railways Department and Ministry of Works, and then later for the Ministry of Defence. After graduation he returned to Rotorua and entered private practice. While a lawyer he served as a legal advisor to the New Zealand Māori Council, the Te Arawa Māori Trust Board and the Tūhoe/Waikaremoana Māori Trust Board.

Hingston had links to Ngāti Tūwharetoa and Te Whānau-ā-Apanui.

== Judicial career ==
Hingston served on the Māori Land Court from 1984 to 1999. While on the court he made the initial decision in Ngati Apa v Attorney-General, which eventually led to the New Zealand foreshore and seabed controversy.

In 2000 he was appointed to the Cook Islands land court, and he later served on the High Court of the Cook Islands and the Cook Islands Court of Appeal. As a Judge of the High Court of the Cook Islands, in 2004 he presided over the judicial recount of the Manihiki electorate which saw prime minister Robert Woonton lose his seat and his office. He also completed the Cook Islands' longest-running land-ownership case, which had been before the courts since 1908. He retired from the Cook Islands bench in 2013.

== Political activities ==
Hingston retired as a New Zealand judge in 1999. After retirement, he helped establish the Māori Party in 2004 and served as one of its co-vice presidents.

== Later life and death ==
In the 2016 New Year Honours, Hingston was appointed a Companion of the Queen's Service Order, for services to Māori and the judiciary. He died in Rotorua on 9 August 2020.

Court offices
Preceded by Gaven Donne	Chief Justice of Niue; 1982–2010	Succeeded by Patrick Savage
