= Judiciary of the Cook Islands =

The judiciary of the Cook Islands is a system of courts that interprets and applies the laws of the Cook Islands. The judiciary has three levels: the Judicial Committee of the Privy Council serves as the final court of appeal. The Cook Islands Court of Appeal hears appeals from the High Court. The High Court of the Cook Islands deals with criminal and civil cases, as well as land cases under customary law. Minor crimes are heard in the High Court by Justices of the Peace.

The judiciary is established by Part IV of the Constitution of the Cook Islands. Originally, the Constitution provided for appointments to be made by the New Zealand High Commissioner, and for the High Court of New Zealand to act as a court of appeal. The Chief Judge of the High Court was renamed the Chief Justice in 1975. In 1981, the Constitution Amendment (No 9) Act 1980-81 reformed the judiciary and established the Court of Appeal. In 1982 the power to appoint judges was repatriated with the establishment of the position of King's Representative with the Constitution Amendment (No 10) Act 1981-82.

== Judges ==
The Chief Justice and a Judge of the Court of Appeal are appointed by the King's Representative on the advice of the Executive Council. High Court Judges are appointed by the King's Representative on the advice of the Executive Council, as tendered by the Chief Justice and the Minister of Justice. Non-resident Judges are appointed for a three-year term; other judges are appointed for life. Judges may be removed from office by the King's Representative on the recommendation of an investigative tribunal and only for inability to perform their office, or for misbehaviour.
