= David Williams (arbitrator) =

New Zealand lawyer, jurist, and international arbitrator

Sir David Williams KNZM KC
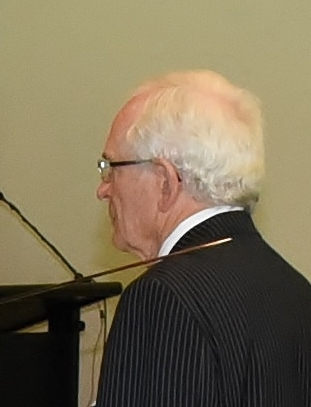
- Williams at his investiture in 2017

5th Chief Justice of the Cook Islands
- In office 2005 – 13 May 2010
- Preceded by: Laurence Greig
- Succeeded by: Tom Weston

Personal details
- Born: David Arthur Rhodes Williams; 17 April 1941 (age 85) Auckland, New Zealand
- Education: University of Auckland (LLB); Harvard Law School (LLM)

Sir David Arthur Rhodes Williams KNZM KC (born 17 April 1941) is a New Zealand lawyer, jurist, and international arbitrator. From 2005 to 2010 he served as Chief Justice of the Cook Islands.

== Early life and family ==
Williams was born in Auckland on 17 April 1941, the son of Trevor Rhodes Williams and Eileen (Elaine) Frances Sarah Williams. He was educated at Mount Albert Grammar School, and went on to study law at the University of Auckland, graduating with a Bachelor of Laws degree in 1965. He then studied in the United States, earning a Master of Laws degree from Harvard University in 1966.

In 1969, Williams married Gail Jocelyn Watt, and the couple had two children.

== Career ==
After graduating from Harvard, Williams spent a few months at Boston law firm Ropes and Gray. After returning to New Zealand, he joined the law firm Russell McVeagh McKenzie Bartleet & Co (now known as Russell McVeagh), where he took on two cases that went to international arbitration, the first such cases in New Zealand. He became a partner at Russell McVeagh in 1969, and at his suggestion, based on his experience in the United States, the firm introduced summer clerkships.

In 1971, Williams was one of the founders of the Environmental Defence Society, which evolved to become the Maruia Society and subsequently the Ecologic Foundation.

Williams was a visiting scholar at the University of Virginia Law School in 1979, and was also a part-time lecturer in law at the University of Auckland. His book, Environmental Law in New Zealand, the first legal text on the subject in New Zealand, was published in 1980, and was awarded the Butterworth Prize for best law book of the year.

In 1985, Williams was appointed Queen's Counsel, and in 1990 he was awarded the New Zealand 1990 Commemoration Medal.

Williams served as a judge of the High Court between 1991 and 1994. He subsequently returned to practising as a barrister and international arbitrator, and was involved in more than 150 international commercial and investment treaty arbitrations, frequently as tribunal president. He also took part in several high-profile cases at the Court of Arbitration for Sport, including as president of the tribunal that upheld Floyd Landis being disqualified for doping after winning the 2006 Tour de France.

From the early 2000s, Williams was a judge of the High Court of the Cook Islands, and was Chief Justice of the Cook Islands between 2005 and 2010. He later served as president of the Cook Islands Court of Appeal, and drafted the Cook Islands' Arbitration Act 2009.

Williams was co-author, with Amokura Kawharu, of the leading text on arbitration law in New Zealand, Williams & Kawharu on Arbitration. Now in its second edition, the first edition in 2011 won the Legal Research Foundation's JF Northey Prize for the year's best legal treatise published in New Zealand.

In the 2017 New Year Honours, Williams was appointed a Knight Companion of the New Zealand Order of Merit, for services to international law and international arbitration.
