= Ministry of Justice (Cook Islands) =

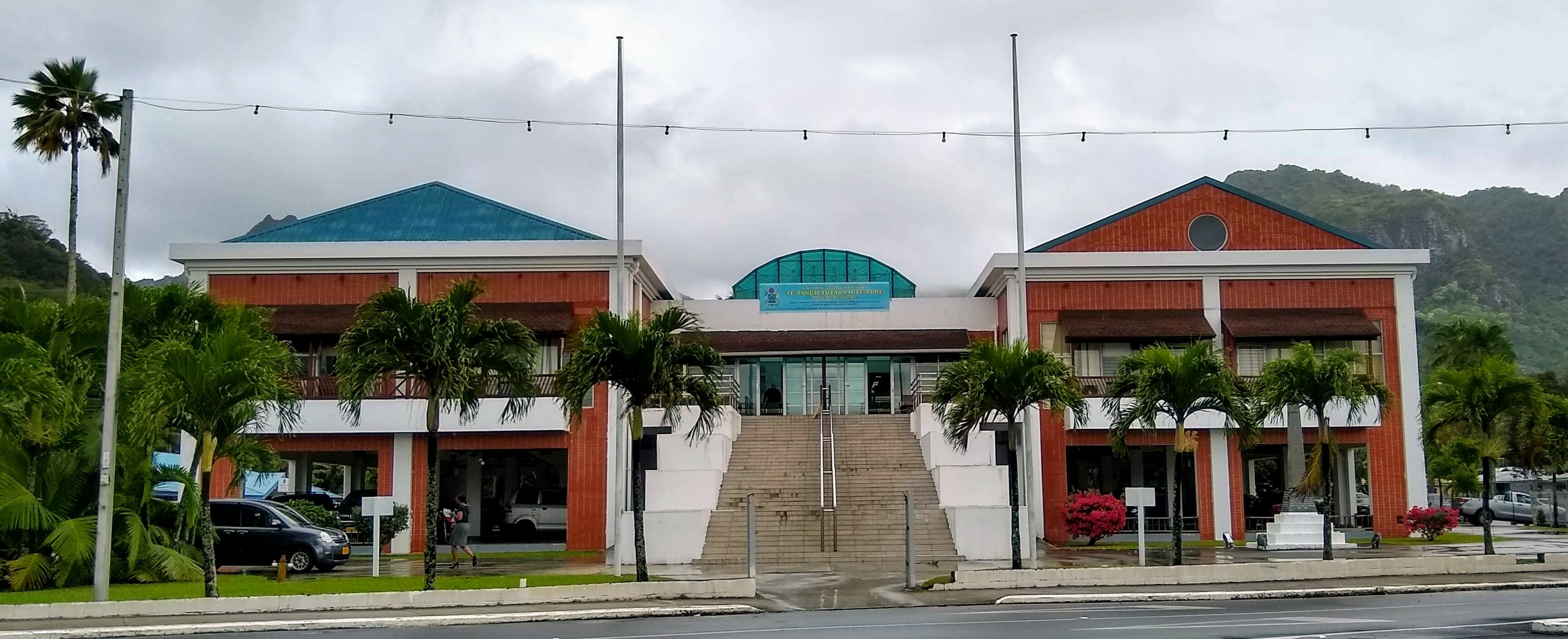
Ministry of Justice Building, Ara Tapu, Avarua. The building was built, and recently refurbished, with Chinese foreign aid.

The Ministry of Justice of the Cook Islands provides support to the country's judiciary so that it may be an impartial system. The ministry is responsible for the following duties: management and rehabilitation of prisoners and probationers, maintaining land and survey information, registration of vital records, electoral policies, and managing the Land Trust account.

== List of ministers (post-1984 upon the country's first coalition government) ==
- Teariki Matenga (1985–1986)
- David Ngatupuna (1986–1988)
- Tekaotiki Matapo (1989–1999)
- Tangata Vavia (2000–2003)
- Robert Wigmore (2003–2008)
- Tangata Vavia (2008–2010)
- Apii Piho (2010–2011)
- Henry Puna (2011–2015)
- Teariki Heather (2015)
- Nandi Glassie (2015–2018)
- Rose Toki-Brown (2018-2021)
- Vaine Mokoroa (2021-present)

== See also ==
- Politics of the Cook Islands
