= Tom Weston =

New Zealand lawyer, Cook Islands judge and poet

Tom Weston KC

6th Chief Justice of the Cook Islands
- In office 13 May 2010 – 2016
- Preceded by: David Williams
- Succeeded by: Hugh Williams

Personal details
- Born: 1958 (age 67–68) Christchurch
- Education: University of Canterbury

Thomas Crowley Weston KC (born 1958) is a New Zealand lawyer and former Chief Justice of the Cook Islands. He is also known as a poet.

== Biography ==
Weston was born in 1958 in Christchurch. He attended the University of Canterbury, from where he graduated with LL.B. (Hons).

Weston has a long history as a commercial litigator. He was appointed Queen's Counsel in 1999, and later that year was appointed to the Rules Committee, the body responsible for setting court rules. He was reappointed in 2002 for a further term of three years.

From 2006, was a part-time judge of the Cook Islands High Court and Court of Appeal. Between 2010 and 2016, he was Chief Justice of the Cook Islands, replacing his legal partner David Williams.

Weston has published several books of poems. Small Humours of Daylight deals mostly with travel by sea between islands, and was reviewed by Graham Brazier for The New Zealand Herald.

== Bibliography ==
=== Poetry collections ===
- Too Lost to Land (multiple authors)
- The Red Orchestra
- The Ambiguous Companion
- Naming the Mind Like Trees
- Small Humours of Daylight
- Only One Question

=== Books on law ===
- Taking Control: A Seminar on Loss Prevention and Risk Management (co-author)
- Competition Law Update (co-author)
- Competition Law: Must Knows (co-author)
