= Court system of Niue =

Court system in Niue

The coat of arms of Niue as used by the judiciary

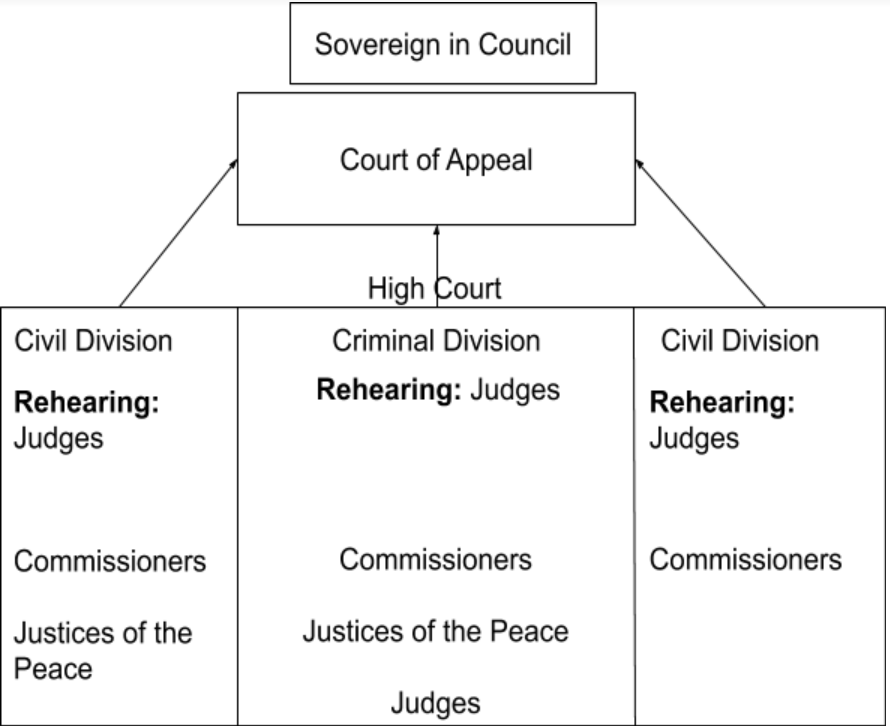
A diagram of the Court System of Niue

The court system of Niue is a three-tiered judicial system established by the Niue Constitution Act in the island nation of Niue. It consists of the High Court, which has original jurisdiction to hear all criminal, civil and land matters, the Court of Appeal, which has appellate civil and criminal jurisdiction, and the Privy Council in England. Justices interpret the law subject to the Constitution of Niue, and if they determine a law violates the Constitution then the Constitution takes precedence. A system of common law is used in the court system, and the Doctrine of Precedent ensures that lower courts follow the precedent of upper courts. The civil and criminal courts operate under an adversarial legal system, while the land courts operate under an inquisitive legal system.

== High Court ==
The High Court of Niue has original jurisdiction in criminal, civil, and land matters. The court is divided into three divisions; criminal division, civil division, and land division. Furthermore, it has three types of officials; Judges, Commissioners, and Justices of the Peace. The main difference between the three is jurisdiction. One other notable difference is the ability to become Chief Justice, which is only a judge's power, and that judges have rehearing powers.

The current Chief Justice is Craig Coxhead. The Chief Justice is chosen by the Governor-General of New Zealand on advice from the cabinet of Niue. As of 2014, the judges are Judge Wilson Isaac, Chief Justice Coxhead and Judge Sarah Reeves. The Civil and Criminal Commissioners are Mr. Desmond Hipa, Mrs. Sifaole Ioane and Mrs. Taumalua Jackson. The Land Commissioners are Mrs. Rheumatic Alapaki, Mrs. Maihetoe Hekau, Mr. Robin Hekau, Mr. Hale Ikitule, Mrs. Leliviika Liumaihetau and Mr. Saukia Tukuitonga. The Justices of the Peace are Ms. Paese McMoore and Mrs. Francis Lui-Valiana.

Two Justices of the Peace must be present to exercise the same functions as one Commissioner. All three can not stay on past 68 years of age. Jurisdiction based on each specific case is outlined in the extensive table below.

The following jurists have served as chief justice:

Ordinal	Officeholders	Term start	Term end	Time in office	Notes
1	Gaven Donne	1975	1982	6–7 years	
2	Heta Hingston	1982	2010	27–28 years	
3	Patrick Savage	2010	2018	7–8 years	
4	Craig Coxhead	22 November 2018	incumbent	7 years, 302 days	

=== Criminal Court ===
In criminal trials, the idea of innocent until proven guilty applies, and the burden of proof is on the prosecution. In 2014, 109 criminal cases were filed and the average duration of a case was 54 days.

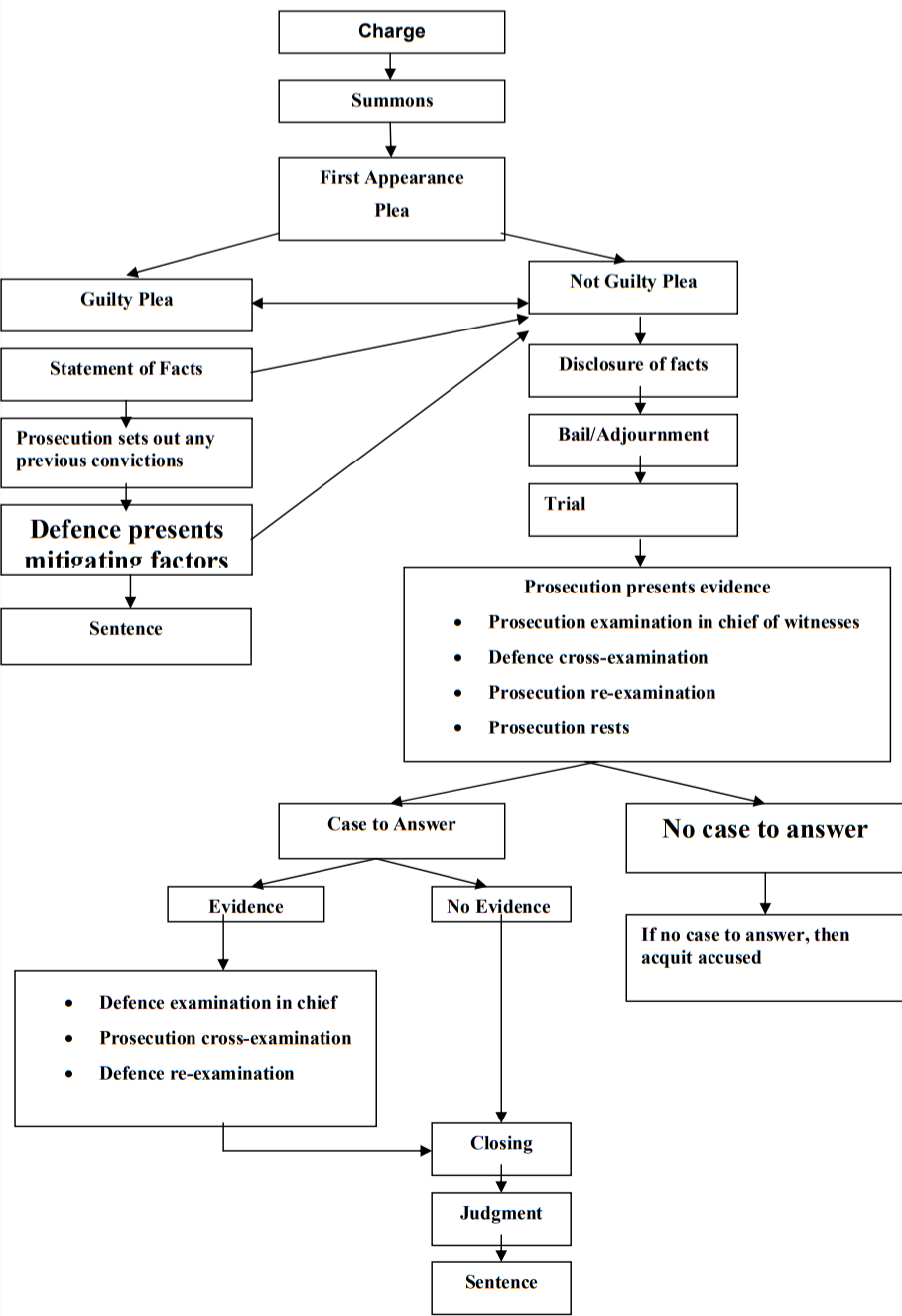
An image of the proceeding of the Niue Criminal Court

==== Criminal proceedings ====
As the diagram on the right shows, there is a complex set of procedures in the Niue criminal court system.

==== Criminal jurisdiction and sentencing ====
Offence	Section of NA	Plea	Maximum Penalty	Jurisdiction	Sentence	Establishment of jurisdiction
Sedition	s. 129	Guilty or Not Guilty	2 years	1 Commissioner or 2 Justices	Can only impose sentence of 1 year	Rule 83 and Sch. 6 RHC
Murder	s. 133-138	Guilty or Not Guilty	Life Imprisonment	Judge	Judge imposes sentence	Art. 38 Constitution
Manslaughter	s. 139	Guilty or Not Guilty	14 years	Judge	Judge imposes sentence	Art. 38 Constitution
Duty to provide necessaries of life	s. 142	Guilty	7 years	1 Commissioner and 2 Justices	Can impose max sentence but requires confirmation of Chief Justice	Rule 84A RHC
Duty to provide necessaries of life	s. 142	Not Guilty	7 years	Judge	Judge imposes sentence	Art. 38 Constitution

Offence	Section of NA	Plea	Maximum Penalty	Jurisdiction	Sentence	Establishment of jurisdiction
Duty of parent or guardian to provide necessaries of life	s. 143	Guilty	7 years	1 Commissioner and 2 Justices	Can impose max sentence but requires confirmation of Chief Justice	Rule 84A RHC
Duty of Parent or Guardian to provide Necessaries of life	s. 143	Not Guilty	7 years	Judge	Judge imposes sentence	Art. 38 Constitution
Attempted Murder	s. 147	Guilty or Not Guilty	14 years	Judge	Judge imposes sentence	Art. 38 Constitution
Conspiracy and inciting murder	s. 148	Guilty	10 years	1 Commissioner and 2 Justices	Can impose max sentence but requires confirmation of Chief Justice	Rule 84A RHC
Conspiracy and inciting murder	s. 148	Not Guilty	10 years	Judge	Judge imposes sentence	Art. 38 Constitution
Counselling Suicide	s. 149	Guilty or Not Guilty	14 years	Judge	Judge imposes sentence	Art. 38 Constitution
Concealment of Birth	s. 150	Guilty or Not Guilty	2 years	1 Commissioner or 2 Justices	Can only impose sentence of up to 1 year	Rule 83(d) and Sch. 6 RHC
Grievous Bodily Harm	s. 151	Guilty	7 years	1 Commissioner and 2 Justices	Can impose max sentence but requires confirmation of Chief Justice	Rule 84A RHC
Grievous Bodily Harm	s. 151	Not Guilty	7 years	Judge	Judge imposes sentence	Art. 38 Constitution
Actual Bodily Harm	s. 152	Guilty or Not Guilty	2 years	1 Commissioner or 2 Justices	Can only impose sentence up to 1 year	Rule 83(d) and Sch. 6 RHC
Omissions resulting in Bodily Harm	s. 153	Guilty or Not Guilty	2 years	1 Commissioner or 2 Justices	Can only impose sentence up to 1 year	Rule 83(d) and Sch. 6 RHC
Intentionally endangering persons on aerodromes	s. 154	Guilty or Not Guilty	14 years	Judge	Judge imposes sentence	Art. 38 Constitution

Offence	Section of NA	Plea	Maximum Penalty	Jurisdiction	Sentence	Establishment of jurisdiction
Wantonly endanger persons on/near aerodromes	s. 155	Guilty or Not Guilty	2 years	1 Commissioner or 2 Justices	Can only impose sentence up to 1 year	Rule 83(d) and Sch. 6 RHC
Indecent Assault	s. 156	Guilty	5 years	1 Commissioner and 2 Justices	Can impose max sentence but requires confirmation of Chief Justice	Rule 84A RHC
Indecent Assault	s. 156	Not Guilty	5 years	Judge	Judge imposes sentence	Art. 38 Constitution
Assault	s. 157	Guilty or Not Guilty	1 year	1 Commissioner or 2 Justices	Impose sentence	Rule 83(d) and Sch. 6 RHC
Cruelty to a Child	s. 157A	Guilty	5 years	1 Commissioner and 2 Justices	Can impose max sentence but requires confirmation of Chief Justice	Rule 84A RHC
Cruelty to a Child	s. 157A	Not Guilty	5 years	Judge	Judge imposes sentence	Art. 38 Constitution
Resisting Constable in execution of his/her duty	s. 158	Guilty or Not Guilty	6 months or $40 fine	1 Commissioner or 2 Justices	Impose sentence	Rule 2(3) Amendment No. 5 RHC
Abduction of girl under 15	s. 159	Guilty or Not Guilty	2 years	1 Commissioner or 2 Justices	Can only impose sentence of 1 year	Rule 2(3) Amendment No. 5 RHC
Abduction of children	s. 160	Guilty or Not Guilty	2 years	1 Commissioner or 2 Justices	Can only impose sentence of 1 year	Rule 83(d) and Sch. 6 RHC
Rape	s. 162	Guilty or Not Guilty	14 years	Judge	Judge imposes sentence	Art. 38 Constitution
Sexual Intercourse/ indecency with girl under 12	s. 163	Guilty	10 years	1 Commissioner and 2 Justices	Can impose max sentence but requires confirmation of Chief Justice	Rule 84A RHC
Sexual Intercourse/ indecency with girl under 12	s. 163	Not Guilty	10 years	Judge	Judge Imposes Sentence	Art. 38 Constitution

Offence	Section of NA	Plea	Maximum Penalty	Jurisdiction	Sentence	Establishment of jurisdiction
Sexual Intercourse/ indecency with girl between 12 and 15	s. 164	Guilty or Not Guilty	3 years	1 Commissioner or 2 Justices	Can only impose sentence of 1 year	Rule 2(3) Amendment No. 5 RHC
Sexual Intercourse with woman of unsound mind, imbecile or idiot	s. 165	Guilty or Not Guilty	2 years	1 Commissioner or 2 Justices	Can only impose sentence of 1 year	Rule 2(3) Amendment No. 5 RHC
Procuring Miscarriage of woman or girl	s. 166	Guilty or Not Guilty	2 years	1 Commissioner or 2 Justices	Can only impose sentence of 1 year	Rule 83(d) and Sch. 6 RHC
Woman or girl procuring her own miscarriage	s. 167	Guilty or Not Guilty	2 years	1 Commissioner or 2 Justices	Can only impose sentence of 1 year	Rule 83(d) and Sch. 6 RHC
Supplying means of miscarriage	s. 168	Guilty or Not Guilty	2 years	1 Commissioner or 2 Justices	Can only impose sentence of 1 year	Rule 83(d) and Sch. 6 RHC
Bigamy	s. 169	Guilty	5 years	1 Commissioner and 2 Justices	Can impose max sentence but requires confirmation of Chief Justice	Rule 84A RHC
Bigamy	s. 169	Not Guilty	5 years	Judge	Judge imposes sentence	Art. 38 Constitution
Buggery	s. 170	Guilty	10 years	1 Commissioner and 2 Justices	Can impose max sentence but requires confirmation of Chief Justice	Rule 84A RHC
Buggery	s. 170	Not Guilty	10 years	Judge	Judge imposes sentence	Art. 38 Constitution
Attempted Buggery and indecent assaults on males	s. 171	Guilty	5 years	1 Commissioner and 2 Justices	Can impose max sentence but requires confirmation of Chief Justice	Rule 84A RHC
Attempted Buggery and indecent assaults on males	s. 171	Not Guilty	5 years	Judge	Judge imposes Sentence	Art. 38 Constitution

Offence	Section of NA	Plea	Maximum Penalty	Jurisdiction	Sentence	Establishment of jurisdiction
Incest	s. 172	Guilty	7 years	1 Commissioner and 2 Justices	Can impose max sentence but requires confirmation of Chief Justice	Rule 84A RHC
Incest	s. 172	Not Guilty	7 years	Judge	Judge imposes sentence	Art. 38 Constitution
Indecent Acts	s. 173	Guilty or Not Guilty	6 months	1 Commissioner or 2 Justices	Commissioner or 2 Justices impose sentence	Rule 83(d) and Sch. 6 RHC
Indecent Documents	s. 174	Guilty or Not Guilty	6 months	1 Commissioner or 2 Justices	Commissioner or 2 Justices impose sentence	Rule 83(d) and Sch. 6 RHC
Brothels	s. 175	Guilty or Not Guilty	6 months	1 Commissioner or 2 Justices	Commissioner or 2 Justices impose sentence	Rule 83(d) and Sch. 6 RHC
Gaming Houses	s. 176	Guilty or Not Guilty	6 months	1 Commissioner or 2 Justices	Commissioner or 2 Justices impose sentence	Rule 83(d) and Sch. 6 RHC
Riot	s. 177	Guilty or Not Guilty	2 years	1 Commissioner or 2 Justices	Can only impose sentence of 1 year	Rule 83(d) and Sch. 6 RHC
Forcible Entry	s. 178	Guilty or Not Guilty	6 months	1 Commissioner or 2 Justices	Commissioner or 2 Justices impose sentence	Rule 83(d) and Sch. 6 RHC
Affrays	s. 179	Guilty or Not Guilty	1 year	1 Commissioner or 2 Justices	Commissioner or 2 Justices impose sentence	Rule 83(d) and Sch. 6 RHC
Judicial Corruption in judicial capacity	s. 180A(1)	Guilty or Not Guilty	14 years	Judge	Judge imposes sentence	Art. 38 Constitution
Judicial Corruption in official capacity	s. 180A(2)	Guilty	7 years	1 Commissioner and 2 Justices	Can impose max sentence but requires confirmation of Chief Justice	Rule 84A RHC
Judicial Corruption in official capacity	s. 180A(2)	Not Guilty	7 years	Judge	Judge imposes sentence	Art. 38 Constitution

Offence	Section of NA	Plea	Maximum Penalty	Jurisdiction	Sentence	Establishment of jurisdiction
Bribery of Judicial Officer in Judicial Capacity	s. 180B(1)	Guilty	7 years	1 Commissioner and 2 Justices	Requires confirmation by Chief Justice	Rule 84A RHC
Bribery of Judicial Officer in Judicial Capacity	s. 180B(1)	Not Guilty	7 years	Judge	Judge imposes sentence	Art. 38 Constitution
Bribery of Judicial Officer in Official Capacity	s. 180B(2)	Guilty	5 years	1 Commissioner and 2 Justices	Can impose max sentence but requires confirmation of Chief Justice	Rule 84A RHC
Bribery of Judicial Officer in Official Capacity	s. 180B(2)	Not Guilty	5 years	Judge	Judge imposes sentence	Art. 38 Constitution
Minister of Crown accepts bribe or is found corrupt	s. 180C(1)	Guilty or Not Guilty	14 years	Judge. Prosecutor requires leave of a judge to prosecute.	Judge imposes sentence	Art. 38 Constitution
Person gives corruptly gives bribe to any person to influence Minister of Crown	s. 180C(2)	Guilty	7 years	1 Commissioner and 2 Justices. Prosecutor requires leave of Commissioner to prosecute.	Can impose max sentence but requires confirmation of Chief Justice	Rule 84A RHC
Person gives corruptly gives bribe to any person to influence Minister of Crown	s. 180C(2)	Not Guilty	7 years	Judge. Prosecutor Requires leave of Judge to prosecute.	Judge imposes sentence	Art. 38 Constitution
Member of L. Assembly accepts bribe	s. 180D(1)	Guilty	7 years	1 Commissioner and 2 Justices. Prosecutor requires leave of Commissioner to prosecute.	Can impose max sentence but requires confirmation of Chief Justice	Rule 84A RHC
Member of L. Assembly accepts bribe	s. 180D(1)	Not Guilty	7 years	Judge. Prosecutor requires leave of judge to prosecute.	Judge imposes sentence	Art. 38 Constitution

Offence	Section of NA	Plea	Maximum Penalty	Jurisdiction	Sentence	Establishment of jurisdiction
Person offers bribe to member of L. Assembly	s. 180D(2)	Guilty or Not Guilty	3 years	1 Commissioner or 2 Justices. Prosecutor requires leave of Commissioner to prosecute.	Can only impose sentence of 1 year	Rule 2(3) Amendment No. 5 RHC
Law enforcement officer accepts bribe	s. 180E(1)	Guilty	7 years	1 Commissioner and 2 Justices	Can impose max sentence but requires confirmation of Chief Justice	Rule 84A RHC
Law enforcement officer accepts bribe	s. 180E(1)	Not Guilty	7 years	Judge	Judge imposes sentence	Art. 38 Constitution
Person offers bribe to law enforcement officer	s. 180E(2)	Guilty or Not Guilty	3 years	1 Commissioner or 2 Justices	Can only impose sentence of 1 year	Rule 2(3) Amendment No. 5 RHC
Official accepts bribe	s. 180F(1)	Guilty	7 years	1 Commissioner and 2 Justices	Can impose max sentence but requires confirmation of Chief Justice	Rule 84A RHC
Official Accepts Bribe	s. 180F(1)	Not Guilty	7 years	Judge	Judge imposes sentence	Art. 38 Constitution
Person bribes official to influence act or omission	s. 180F(2)	Guilty or Not Guilty	3 years	1 Commissioner or 2 Justices	Can only impose sentence of 1 year	Rule 2(3) Amendment No. 5 RHC
Corrupt use of information by official	s. 180G	Guilty	7 years	1 Commissioner and 2 Justices	Can impose max sentence but requires confirmation of Chief Justice	Rule 84A RHC
Corrupt use of information by official	s. 180G	Not Guilty	7 years	Judge	Judge imposes sentence	Art. 38 Constitution
Perjury	s. 181	Guilty	5 years	1 Commissioner and 2 Justices	Can impose max sentence but requires confirmation of Chief Justice	Rule 84A RHC
Perjury	s. 181	Not Guilty	5 years	Judge	Judge imposes sentence	Art. 38 Constitution

Offence	Section of NA	Plea	Maximum Penalty	Jurisdiction	Sentence	Establishment of jurisdiction
Fabricating evidence	s. 182	Guilty or Not Guilty	3 years	1 Commissioner or 2 Justices	Can only impose sentence of 1 year	Rule 83(d) and Sch. 6 RHC
Conspiracy to pervert justice	s. 183	Guilty or Not Guilty	3 years	1 Commissioner or 2 Justices	Can only impose sentence of 1 year	Rule 83(d) and Sch. 6 RHC
Breaking Prison	s. 184	Guilty	5 years	1 Commissioner and 2 Justices	Can impose max sentence but requires confirmation of Chief Justice	Rule 84A RHC
Breaking Prison	s. 184	Not Guilty	5 years	Judge	Judge imposes sentence	Art. 38 Constitution
Escape	s. 185	Guilty or Not Guilty	2 years	1 Commissioner or 2 Justices	Can only impose sentence of 1 year	Rule 83(d) and Sch. 6 RHC
Rescue	s. 186	Guilty or Not Guilty	2 years	1 Commissioner or 2 Justices	Can only impose sentence of 1 year	Rule 83(d) and Sch. 6 RHC
Criminal Libel and Slander	s. 187	Guilty or Not Guilty	6 months	1 Commissioner or 2 Justices	Impose sentence	Rule 2(3) Amendment No. 5 RHC
Theft	s. 188 and s. 192(a)	Guilty or Not Guilty	3 months	1 Commissioner or 2 Justices	Impose sentence	Rule 83(d) and Sch. 6 RHC
Theft	s. 188 and s. 192(b)	Guilty or Not Guilty	1 year	1 Commissioner or 2 Justices	Impose sentence	Rule 83(d) and Sch. 6 RHC
Theft	s. 188 and s. 192(c)	Guilty	5 years	1 Commissioner and 2 Justices	Can impose max sentence but requires confirmation of Chief Justice	Rule 84A RHC
Theft	s. 188 and s. 192(c)	Not Guilty	5 years	Judge	Judge imposes sentence	Art. 38 Constitution
Stealing Documents	s. 193(1)	Guilty or Not Guilty	3 years	1 Commissioner or 2 Justices	Can only impose sentence of 1 year	Rule 2(3) Amendment No. 5 RHC
Stealing Documents (Testamentary instrument)	s. 193(2)	Guilty	10 years	1 Commissioner and 2 Justices	Can impose max sentence but requires confirmation of Chief Justice	Rule 84A RHC
Offence	Section of NA	Plea	Maximum Penalty	Jurisdiction	Sentence	Establishment of jurisdiction
Stealing Documents (Testamentary instrument)	s. 193(2)	Not Guilty	10 years	Judge	Judge imposes sentence	Art. 38 Constitution
Receiving Stolen Goods	s. 194; s. 188 and 192(a)	Guilty or Not Guilty	3 months	1 Commissioner or 2 Justices	Impose sentence	Rule 83(d) and Sch. 6 RHC
Receiving Stolen Goods	s. 194; s. 188 and s. 192(b)	Guilty or Not Guilty	1 year	1 Commissioner or 2 Justices	Impose sentence	Rule 83(d) and Sch. 6 RHC
Receiving Stolen Goods	s. 194; s. 188 and s. 192(c)	Guilty	5 years	1 Commissioner and 2 Justices	Can impose max sentence but requires confirmation of Chief Justice	Rule 84A RHC
Receiving Stolen Goods	s. 194; s. 188 and s. 192(c)	Not Guilty	5 years	Judge	Judge imposes sentence	Art. 38 Constitution
Robbery	s. 195	Guilty	10 years	1 Commissioner and 2 Justices	Can impose max sentence but requires confirmation of Chief Justice	Rule 84A RHC
Robbery	s. 195(1,2)	Not Guilty	10 years	Judge	Judge imposes sentence	Art. 38 Constitution
Assault with intent to commit robbery	s. 195(3)	Guilty	5 years	1 Commissioner and 2 Justices	Can impose max sentence but requires confirmation of Chief Justice	Rule 84A RHC
Assault with intent to commit robbery	s. 195(3)	Not Guilty	5 years	Judge	Judge imposes sentence	Art. 38 Constitution
Conversion or Attempted Conversion of Motorcars	s. 196(1)	Guilty	5 years	1 Commissioner and 2 Justices	Can impose max sentence but requires confirmation of Chief Justice	Rule 84A RHC
Conversion or Attempted Conversion of Motorcars	s. 196(1)	Not Guilty	5 years	Judge	Judge imposes sentence	Art. 38 Constitution
Possession of instrument for conversion of motorcars	s. 196(2)	Guilty or Not Guilty	1 year	1 Commissioner or 2 Justices	Impose sentence	Rule 2(3) Amendment No. 5 RHC

Offence			Section of NA	Plea	Maximum Penalty	Jurisdiction	Sentence	Establishment of jurisdiction
Breach of Trust			s. 197	Guilty	5 years	1 Commissioner and 2 Justices	Can impose max sentence but requires confirmation of Chief Justice	Rule 84A RHC
Breach of Trust			s. 197	Not Guilty	5 years	Judge	Judge imposes sentence	Art. 38 Constitution
Menaces			s. 198	Guilty or Not Guilty	2 years	1 Commissioner or 2 Justices	Can only impose sentence of 1 year	Rule 83(d) and Sch. 6 RHC
Wit	cRH	Caft	s. 199	Guilty or Not Guilty	6 months	1 Commissioner or 2 Justices	Impose sentence	Rule 83(d) and Sch. 6 RHC
Obtaining Credit by Fraud			s. 200	Guilty or Not Guilty	6 months	1 Commissioner or 2 Justices	Impose sentence	Rule 83(d) and Sch. 6 RHC
Accusation of Criminal Offences			s. 201	Guilty or Not Guilty	5 years	1 Commissioner or 2 Justices	Can only impose sentence of 1 year	Rule 83(d) and Sch. 6 RHC
Conspiracy to defraud			s. 202	Guilty or Not Guilty	3 years	1 Commissioner or 2 Justices	Can only impose sentence of 1 year	Rule 83(d) and Sch. 6 RHC
Obtaining Execution of Valuable Securities by Fraud			s. 203	Guilty or Not Guilty	3 years	1 Commissioner or 2 Justices	Can only impose sentence of 1 year	Rule 83(d) and Sch. 6 RHC
Burglary			s. 204	Guilty	5 years	1 Commissioner and 2 Justices	Can impose max sentence but requires confirmation of Chief Justice	Rule 84A RHC
Burglary			s. 204	Not Guilty	5 years	Judge	Judge imposes sentence	Art. 38 Constitution
Unlawful Entry of dwellinghouse with intent to commit criminal offence			s. 205(1)	Guilty	5 years	1 Commissioner and 2 Justices	Can impose max sentence but requires confirmation of Chief Justice	Rule 84A RHC
Unlawful Entry of dwellinghouse with intent to commit criminal offence			s. 205(1)	Not Guilty	5 years	Judge	Judge imposes sentence	Art. 38 Constitution
Offence			Section of NA	Plea	Maximum Penalty	Jurisdiction	Sentence	Establishment of jurisdiction
Unlawful entry of dwellinghouse without intent to commit offence			s. 205(2)	Guilty or Not Guilty	3 months or $20 fine	1 Commissioner or 2 Justices	Impose sentence	Rule 2(3) Amendment No. 5 RHC
Unlawful entering building, ship or aircraft for criminal purpose			s. 205A	Guilty	4 years	1 Commissioner and 2 Justices	Can impose max sentence but requires confirmation of Chief Justice	Rule 84A RHC
Unlawful entering building, ship or aircraft for criminal purpose			s. 205A	Not Guilty	4 years	Judge	Judge imposes sentence	Art. 38 Constitution
Threats to kill or do bodily harm			s. 206	Guilty or Not Guilty	5 years	1 Commissioner or 2 Justices	Can only impose sentence of 1 year	Rule 83(d) and Sch. 6 RHC
Forgery			s. 207	Guilty	5 years	1 Commissioner and 2 Justices	Can impose max sentence but requires confirmation of Chief Justice	Rule 84A RHC
Forgery			s. 207	Not Guilty	5 years	Judge	Judge imposes sentence	Art. 38 Constitution
Making counterfeit coin			s. 209	Guilty	7 years	1 Commissioner and 2 Justices	Can impose max sentence but requires confirmation of Chief Justice	Rule 84A RHC
Making counterfeit coin			s. 209	Not Guilty	7 years	Judge	Judge imposes sentence	Art. 38 Constitution
Lightening Coin			s. 210	Guilty or Not Guilty	2 years	1 Commissioner or 2 Justices	Can only impose sentence of 1 year	Rule 83(d) and Sch. 6 RHC
Uttering Counterfeit Coin			s. 211	Guilty or Not Guilty	6 months	1 Commissioner or 2 Justices	Impose sentence	Rule 83(d) and Sch. 6 RHC
Arson			s. 212	Guilty	5 years	1 Commissioner and 2 Justices	Can impose max sentence but requires confirmation of Chief Justice	Rule 84A RHC

Offence	Section of NA	Plea	Maximum Penalty	Jurisdiction	Sentence	Establishment of jurisdiction
Arson	s. 212	Not Guilty	5 years	Judge	Judge imposes sentence	Art. 38 Constitution
Wilful Mischief to property	s. 213	Guilty or Not Guilty	3 years if damage over $20 6 months for damage less than $20	1 Commissioner or 2 Justices	Can only impose sentence of 1 year if over $20 or impose full sentence for less than $20	Rule 83(d) and Sch. 6 RHC
Provoking breach of peace	s. 214	Guilty or Not Guilty	$10 fine	1 Commissioner or 2 Justices	Impose sentence	Rule 83(d) and Sch. 6 or 83(c) RHC
Profane, indecent and obscene language	s. 215	Guilty or Not Guilty	3 months or $40 fine	1 Commissioner or 2 Justices	Impose sentence	Rule 83(d) and Sch. 6 or 83(c) RHC
Disorderly Conduct in Public Places	s. 216	Guilty or Not Guilty	$10 fine	1 Commissioner or 2 Justices	Impose sentence	Rule 83(d) and Sch. 6 or 83(c) RHC
Obstructing Public Place	s. 217	Guilty or Not Guilty	$10 fine	1 Commissioner or 2 Justices	Impose sentence	Rule 83(d) and Sch. 6 or 83(c) RHC
Drunkenness	s. 218	Guilty or Not Guilty	$20 fine	1 Commissioner or 2 Justices	Impose sentence	Rule 83(d) and Sch. 6 or 83(c) RHC
Animal Trespass	s. 219	Guilty or Not Guilty	$10 fine	1Commissioner or 2 Justices	Impose sentence	Rule 83(d) and Sch. 6 or 83(c) RHC
Prostitution	s. 220	Guilty or Not Guilty	$10 fine	1 Commissioner or 2 Justices	Impose sentence	Rule 83(d) and Sch. 6 or 83(c) RHC
Laying Poison	s. 221	Guilty or Not Guilty	$10 fine	1 Commissioner or 2 Justices	Impose sentence	Rule 83(d) and Sch. 6 or 83(c) RHC
Polluting Water	s. 222	Guilty or Not Guilty	6 months or $100 fine	1 Commissioner or 2 Justices	Impose sentence	Rule 83(d) and Sch. 6 RHC
Sale of Unwholesome provisions	s. 223	Guilty or Not Guilty	1 month or $40	1 Commissioner or 2 Justices	Impose sentence	Rule 83(d) and Sch. 6 RHC
Unsanitary Premises	s. 224	Guilty or Not Guilty	$20 fine	1 Commissioner or 2 Justices	Impose sentence	Rule 83(d) and Sch. 6 or 83(c) RHC
Wilful Trespass	s. 225	Guilty or Not Guilty	$10 fine	1 Commissioner or 2 Justices	Impose sentence	Rule 83(d) and Sch. 6 or 83(c) RHC
Cruelty to Animals	s. 226	Guilty or Not Guilty	1 month or $20 fine	1 Commissioner or 2 Justices	Impose sentence	Rule 83(d) and Sch. 6 RHC

Offence	Section of NA	Plea	Maximum Penalty	Jurisdiction	Sentence	Establishment of jurisdiction
Falsely Trading as a Incorporated Company	s. 227	Guilty or Not Guilty	$200 fine	1 Commissioner or 2 Justices	Impose sentence	Rule 83(d) and Sch. 6 or 83(c) RHC
Wrongful Communicatio n/ retention/ copying of official information	s. 228A	Guilty or Not Guilty	3 years	1 Commissioner or 2 Justices	Can only impose sentence of 1 year	Rule 2(3) Amendment No. 5 RHC

==== Transport jurisdiction ====
These tables describe traffic jurisdiction under the Niue Transport Act 1965 and its amendments. The shaded parts refer to a problem created by amendments to the Transport Act.

Offence	Section of NTA	Max. penalty	Jurisdiction	Sentence	Disqualification	Endorsement
Use/permit use of vehicle without registration or license	s. 5(1)	$100 fine	1 Commissioner or 2 Justices	May impose sentence	No	No
Use/permit use of vehicle without reg. plates	s. 5(1)	$100 fine	1 Commissioner or 2 Justices	May impose sentence	No	No
Wilfully or negligently deface reg. plate	s. 5(1)	$100 fine	1 Commissioner or 2 Justices	May impose sentence	No	No
Unlicensed person who drives motor vehicle	s. 19(1)	$100 fine	1 Commissioner or 2 Justices	May impose sentence	No	No
Vehicles to keep left	s. 28	$100 (s. 103 NTA)	1 Commissioner or 2 Justices	May impose sentence	May disqualify present or future drivers license: s. 44(1)	Yes: s. 44(2)

Offence	Section of NTA	Max. penalty	Jurisdiction	Sentence	Disqualification	Endorsement
Driver to give audible signal when overtaking	s. 29	$100 (s. 103 NTA)	1 Commissioner or 2 Justices	May impose sentence	May disqualify present or future drivers license: s. 44(1)	Yes: s. 44(2)
Overtaking involving risk	s. 30	$100 (s. 103 NTA)	1 Commissioner or 2 Justices	May impose sentence	May disqualify present or future drivers license: s. 44(1)	Yes: s. 44(2)
Right hand turn at intersection	s. 31	$100 (s. 103 NTA)	1 Commissioner or 2 Justices	May impose sentence	May disqualify present or future drivers license: s. 44(1)	Yes: s. 44(2)
Driver to yield right of way to vehicle approaching right	s. 32	$100 (s. 103 NTA)	1 Commissioner or 2 Justices	May impose sentence	May disqualify present or future drivers license: s. 44(1)	Yes: s. 44(2)
Unsafe vehicles	s. 33	$100 (s. 103 NTA)	1 Commissioner or 2 Justices	May impose sentence	May disqualify present or future drivers license: s. 44(1)	Yes: s. 44(2)
Dangerous riding on vehicles	s. 34	$100 (s. 103 NTA)	1 Commissioner or 2 Justices	May impose sentence	May disqualify present or future drivers license: s. 44(1)	Yes: s. 44(2)
Motor driver's visible signals	s. 35	$100 (s. 103 NTA)	1 Commissioner or 2 Justices	May impose sentence	May disqualify present or future drivers license: s. 44(1)	Yes: s. 44(2)

Offence	Section of NTA	Max. penalty	Jurisdiction	Sentence	Disqualification	Endorsement
Parking of motor vehicle	s. 36	$100 (s. 103 NTA)	1 Commissioner or 2 Justices	May impose sentence	May disqualify present or future drivers license: s. 44(1)	Yes: s. 44(2)
Towing of motor vehicles and leading animals	s. 37	$100 (s. 103 NTA)	1 Commissioner or 2 Justices	May impose sentence	May disqualify present or future drivers license: s. 44(1)	Yes: s. 44(2)
Number of persons on motor cycles	s. 38	$100 (s. 103 NTA)	1 Commissioner or 2 Justices	May impose sentence	May disqualify present or future drivers license: s. 44(1)	Yes: s. 44(2)
Safety Helmets for motor-cyclists	s. 38A	$100 (s. 103 NTA)	1 Commissioner or 2 Justices	May impose sentence	May disqualify present or future drivers license: s. 44(1)	Yes: s. 44(2)
Causing death or bodily injury through reckless or negligent driving	s. 39(a)	Five years or $1500 fine or both	1 Commissioner or 2 Justices: Article 2(2) 1975 Amendment of RHC	Can only impose sentence of 1 year or $200 fine	Shall disqualify for 1 year (may disqualify for longer) unless special reasons for Court not to.	Yes: s. 44(2)
Causing death or bodily injury by driving while intoxicated	s. 39(b)	Five years or $1500 fine or both	1 Commissioner or 2 Justices: Article 2(2) 1975 Amendment of RHC	Can only impose sentence of 1 year or $200 fine	Shall disqualify for 1 year (may disqualify for longer) unless special reasons for Court not to.	Yes: s. 44(2)

Offence	Section of NTA	Max. penalty	Jurisdiction	Sentence	Disqualification	Endorsement
Reckless or negligent driving in a public place	s. 40(1) (a)	$100 fine: under s. 103 NTA (general penalties)	1 Commissioner or 2 Justices	Impose fine	No	N/A
Driving at a speed which is/might be dangerous to the public	s. 40(1) (b)	$100 fine: under s. 103 NTA (general penalties)	1 Commissioner or 2 Justices	Impose fine	No	N/A
Driving a vehicle in a manner dangerous to the public or any person	s. 40(1) (d)	$100 fine: under s. 103 NTA (general penalties)	1 Commissioner or 2 Justices	Impose fine	No	N/A
Driving under the influence of drink or drugs	s. 40(2)	6 months or $1000 or both; sentence of comm- unity work	1 Commissioner or 2 Justices	Can impose 6 months sentence or fine up to $200	Can disqualify for period as Court considers appropriate	Yes: s. 44(2)
Careless driving	s. 40(3)	$500 fine	1 Commissioner or 2 Justices	Can impose $200 fine	Can disqualify for period not exceeding 3 months	Yes: s. 44(2)
Failure to comply with direction of police when consider incapable of driving	s. 41	$500 fine	1 Justice or 2 Commissioners	Can impose $200 fine	Can disqualify for up to 3 months	Yes: s. 44(2)
Driver failing to comply with duty after accident where person is injured	s. 42	1 year or $500 fine	1 Justice or 2 Commissioners	Can impose 1-year sentence or impose $200 fine	Yes: can disqualify for up to 3 months	Yes: s. 44(2)
Driver failing to comply with duty after accident where no person injured	s. 42(4)	3 months or $500 fine	1 Commissioner or 2 Justices	Can impose sentence or $200 fine	No	N/A
Driving with disqualified license	s. 45	$500	1 Commissioner or 2 Justices	Can impose up to $200 fine	Yes: shall disqualify for 1 year or longer unless Court has special reasons related to the offence not to	Yes: s. 44(2)

Offence	Section of NTA	Max. penalty	Jurisdiction	Sentence	Disqualification	Endorsement
Driving with excessive breath/ blood alcohol level	s. 45A	6 months or $1000 or both or comm- unity work	1 Commissioner or 2 Justices	Can impose sentence and up to $200 fine	Yes: may disqualify for period Court considers appropriate	Yes: s. 44(2)
Speeding	s. 47(1)	$100 fine	1 Commissioner or 2 Justices	Impose fine	No	N/A
Failure to have proper equipment and brakes	Part VII: ss. 49 to 68	$100 fine: under s. 103 NTA (general penalties)	1 Commissioner or 2 Justices	Impose fine	No	N/A
Warrant of vehicle fitness required	s. 73	$100 fine: under s. 103 NTA (general penalties)	1 Commissioner or 2 Justices	Impose fine	No	N/A
Wilfully or negligently removes, defaces, damages traffic sign	s. 80	$100 fine: under s. 103 NTA (general penalties)	1 Commissioner or 2 Justices	Impose fine	No	N/A
Public places to be kept free from obstructions	Part X: ss. 81 to 83	$100 fine: under (general penalties)	1 Commissioner or 2 Justices	Impose fine	No	N/A
Rules relating to bicycles	Part XI: ss. 84 to 94	$100 fine: under s. 103 NTA (general penalties)	1 Commissioner or 2 Justices s. 103 NTA	Impose fine	No	N/A
No liquor on public transport	s. 95	$100 fine: under s. 103 NTA (general penalties)	1 Commissioner or 2 Justices	Impose fine	No	N/A
Speed limit for trucks carrying passengers	s. 96	$100 fine: under s. 103 NTA (general penalties)	1 Commissioner or 2 Justices	Impose fine	No	N/A
Unlawful interference with vehicle	s. 100	$500	1 Commissioner or 2 Justices	Impose fine up to $200	No	N/A
Offence	Section of NTA	Max. penalty	Jurisdiction	Sentence	Disqualification	Endorsement
Failure to comply with directions given in relation to NTA	s. 102 (a)	$100 fine: under s. 103 NTA (general penalties)	1 Commissioner or 2 Justices	Impose fine	No	N/A
Wilfully obstruct person doing duty under NTA	s. 102(b)	$100 fine: under s. 103 NTA (general penalties)	1 Commissioner or 2 Justices	Impose fine	No	N/A
Knowingly makes false statement in any application under NTA	s. 102(f)	$100 fine: under s. 103 NTA (general penalties)	1 Commissioner or 2 Justices	Impose fine	No	N/A

=== Civil Court and Jurisdiction ===
One commissioner or 2 Justices of the Peace have the jurisdiction to hear a civil action for which the recovery of debt or damages does not exceed NZ $1500. However, in practice, judges are the ones that generally hear civil cases. In 2013–14, 22 civil cases were filed and the average duration of a case was 52 days.

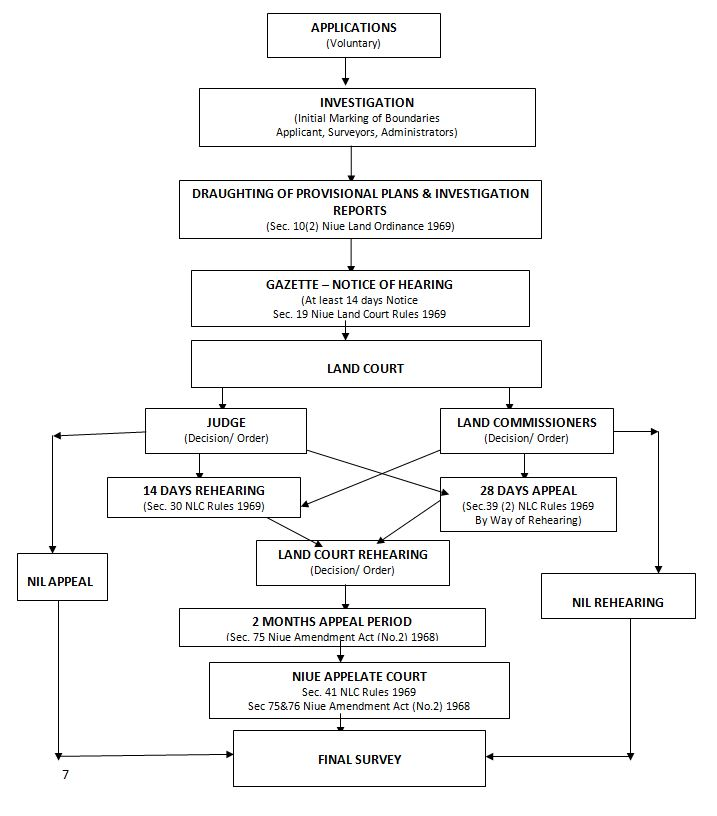
Image of the proceedings of the Niue land court

=== Land Court and Jurisdiction ===
Commissioners and Judges have jurisdiction in the Land Court. In 2013, 260 cases were filed, 150 were resolved, and the average duration of a case was 72 days. On the right is a diagram of the structure and proceedings of a case in the Land Court.

== Court of Appeal ==
The Court of Appeal is an appellate court that may hear appeals based on the High Court granting leave for cases of extraordinary importance, if the High Court certifies it relates to the interpretation of the constitution, or when the Court of Appeal grants special leave to appeal. In criminal jurisdiction, a person convicted of a criminal offence may appeal if they are sentenced to death, imprisonment for life, or to a fine or imprisonment that is not fixed by law. The Court of Appeal meets approximately every three years. Very few cases are appealed to the Court of Appeal, often less than 3 a year, and of those on average a very small amount are overturned.

== The Sovereign in Council ==
The Sovereign in Council is officially the highest court in Niue. It is the King of the United Kingdom, acting by and with the advice of the Judicial Committee of the Privy Council. Appeals may be made by the aggrieved party from the Court of Appeal, and it is up to His Majesty's discretion whether to accept the case. This function is in reality one of the Judicial Committee of the Privy Council, which is the highest court in the Niue court system. The Judicial Committee has not yet heard a case from Niue, although they have heard many cases from the nearby Cook Islands.
