= 1999 Cook Islands parliamentary term referendum =

A referendum on reducing the term length of Parliament from five to four years was held in the Cook Islands on 16 June 1999. The proposal would amend article 37 of the constitution, which at the time read "The Queen's Representative shall dissolve Parliament at the expiration of 5 years from the date of the last preceding general election, if it has not sooner been dissolved." The change was approved by 64.5% of voters, but this was below the two-thirds majority required to modify the constitution. A second referendum in 2004 was passed by the majority required.

== Results ==
Choice	Votes	%
For		64.5
Against		36.5
Total		
Total votes	9,371	–
Registered voters/turnout	10,601	88.40
Source: Direct Democracy
