= Merata Kawharu =

New Zealand writer and academic

Merata Kawharu MNZM FRSNZ
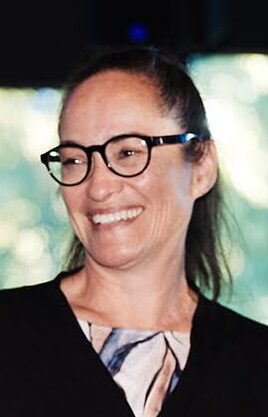
- Kawharu in 2025
- Relatives: Hugh Kāwharu (father)

Academic background
- Education: University of Oxford
- Thesis: Dimensions of Kaitiakitanga: an investigation of a customary Maori principle of resource management (1998)

Academic work
- Discipline: Māori culture
- Sub-discipline: Kaitiakitanga
- Institutions: University of Auckland; University of Otago

Merata Kawharu MNZM FRSNZ is a New Zealand Māori writer and academic. She has been a member of government boards and committees including the New Zealand Historic Places Trust and the Māori Heritage Council, the New Zealand Geographic Board and advisor to the Ministry of Business, Innovation and Employment, the Ministry of Māori Development, the Climate Change Commission and the Ministry for the Environment. Her doctoral research was on the concept of kaitiakitanga (or guardianship) within Māori culture and law. She has led large science programmes on climate adaptation, food economies and entrepreneurship models, looking at how western science, technology and Māori knowledge systems and science can be brought together with community leadership to address pressing environmental, social or economic challenges.

In January 2024, she was appointed Deputy Vice Chancellor Māori at Lincoln University.

In 2025 Kawharu was elected a Fellow of the Royal Society Te Apārangi.

Affiliating to the Ngāti Whātua and Ngāpuhi iwi, she is the daughter of Sir Hugh Kawharu.

== Academic career ==
After a Rhodes Scholarship took her to Oxford University for a PhD in anthropology, Kawharu returned to the New Zealand to posts at the universities of Auckland and Otago and roles with the United Nations, UNESCO, NZ Historic Places Trust Board and Māori Heritage Council. She is a principal investigator at Ngā Pae o te Māramatanga.

Kawharu is a member of the New Zealand Geographic Board.

In the 2012 New Year Honours, Kawharu was appointed a Member of the New Zealand Order of Merit, for services to Māori education.

In March 2025 Kawharu was elected a Fellow of the Royal Society Te Apārangi "for her contribution to developing indigenous entrepreneurship theory". Her co-authored book (with Paul Tapsell) "Whāriki: The growth of Māori community entrepreneurship" was listed as one of 180 Māori-authored books of significance.
