= Amokura Kawharu =

New Zealand High Court justice

The Honourable Amokura Kawharu FRSNZ
- Known for: First woman to be President of the New Zealand Law Commission; First Māori to be President of the New Zealand Law Commission

Academic background
- Education: University of Cambridge

Academic work
- Institutions: University of Auckland; New Zealand Law Commission
- Notable works: Williams & Kawharu on Arbitration

Judge of the High Court
- Incumbent
- Assumed office 9 February 2026
- Appointed by: Judith Collins

Amokura Kawharu FRSNZ is a New Zealand jurist who serves as a judge of the High Court, sitting in the Auckland High Court. She was previously a legal academic and barrister. Kawharu was elected as a Fellow of the Royal Society Te Apārangi in 2021. She was the first woman and the first Māori to be president of the New Zealand Law Commission.

== Academic and legal career ==
Kawharu earned a BA/LLB(Hons) degree from the University of Auckland, followed by a Master of Laws at the University of Cambridge with a major in international law, and a PhD from Victoria University of Wellington. From 1997 to 2004 she practised commercial law in Sydney and Auckland, and between 2005 and 2020 worked at the University of Auckland, specialising in arbitration, property law and international economic regulation. She is a barrister of the High Court of New Zealand.

In 2020 she was appointed as President of the New Zealand Law Commission, and was both the first woman and the first Māori appointed to the role. For several years Kawharu was a Board member of New Zealand's Māori Centre of Research Excellence, Ngā Pae o te Māramatanga.

Kawharu has published widely in the arbitration law field, and is co-author with Sir David Williams KC of the leading text on arbitration law in New Zealand, Williams & Kawharu on Arbitration. Now on its second edition, the first won the Legal Research Foundation's JF Northey Memorial Book Award for 2011.

== Awards ==
Kawharu is a Fellow of the Arbitrators’ and Mediators’ Institute of New Zealand. In 2021 she was elected as a Fellow of the Royal Society Te Apārangi. The citation said Kawharu "is the foremost scholar of New Zealand arbitration law. ...Although an established field elsewhere, New Zealand had no tradition of arbitration scholarship. With new laws adopted in 1996 and the re-birth of arbitration practice, Kawharu established arbitration as a field of academic study in New Zealand, has led reform and development of arbitration law through her scholarship and advocacy, and raised its profile internationally. As President of the Law Commission, she is now also leading the consideration of te ao Māori in the process of law reform."

== Personal life ==
She is affiliated with Ngāti Whātua and Ngāpuhi iwi.

She is the daughter of the late Sir Hugh and Lady Freda Kawharu.
