= Ian Barker (jurist) =

New Zealand jurist (1934–2022)

The Honourable Sir Ian Barker KC
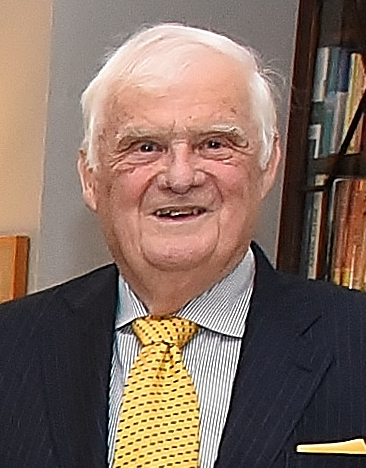
- Barker in 2018

Judge of the High Court
- In office 1976–1997

7th Chancellor of the University of Auckland
- In office 1991–1999
- Preceded by: Mick Brown
- Succeeded by: John Graham

Personal details
- Born: Richard Ian Barker; 17 March 1934 Taumarunui, New Zealand
- Died: 11 November 2022 (aged 88)
- Spouse: Mary Christine Allardyce (m. 1965)
- Education: University of Auckland
- Occupation: Lawyer, judge
- Known for: Cook Islands law reform

Sir Richard Ian Barker KC (17 March 1934 – 11 November 2022) was a New Zealand jurist. His legal career spanned over six decades. He was a lawyer for 20 years, followed by 20 years as a judge at the High Court, before he worked for another two decades as a mediator and arbitrator. Barker was involved in the law reform in the Cook Islands.

== Early life ==
Barker was born in Taumarunui on 17 March 1934. His parents were Kate Dorothy (née Humphrys) and Archibald Henry Barker. He received his education at a primary school in Taumarunui (St Patrick's Convent) before attending boarding school in Auckland (Sacred Heart College). He went to the University of Auckland and graduated with a Bachelor of Arts and a Bachelor of Laws in 1958.

== Legal career ==
Barker was admitted to the bar in 1958. He was a barrister and solicitor from then onwards. From 1960 to 1969, he was a partner at Morpeth Gould and Co in Auckland. Between 1969 and 1976, he was a barrister working by himself. During this time, in 1973, he was appointed a Queen's Counsel. In 1976, he was appointed as a judge to the High Court. He served as Judge-in-Charge of the High Court from 1987 and was senior puisne judge from 1993, serving some stints as Acting Chief Justice. From 1981 he also served simultaneously on the Court of Appeal of New Zealand.

Barker was a member of the Rules Committee for eleven years, including eight years as chair, and implemented the new High Court Rules in 1985, a significant reform and simplification of the system. At the High Court he played a key role in the introduction of judicial case management, a radical step for a common law jurisdiction at that time. Barker presided over several complex cases including the 10-year long Securitibank liquidation.

Barker retired from the High Court in 1997 and had served six years as an executive judge. He remained an acting High Court judge for some years after 1997.

After finishing as a judge in New Zealand, Barker was a judge at the Cook Islands Court of Appeal. He sat as a judge in appeal courts in Fiji, the Pitcairn Islands (which is held in Auckland), Samoa, Vanuatu, and Kiribati. He carried out a significant reform of the law of the Cook Islands. Barker retired from legal work in 2019.

From the 1980s, Barker was a visiting fellow and lecturer at law schools in Australia, Canada, and England (including Wolfson College, Cambridge). Barker was one of the founding members of Bankside Chambers in Auckland. He served as chancellor of the University of Auckland from 1991 to 1999, becoming its longest serving chancellor. He was president of the Legal Research Foundation from 1982 to 1991 and was also appointed a fellow of the foundation in 1991. Barker was also a patron of the In-House Lawyers Association of New Zealand.

After his retirement as a judge Barker continued in the legal profession as an arbitrator and mediator. He was a founder member of Bankside Chambers in the early 2000s. He chaired the New Zealand Banking Ombudsman from 1997 to 2010. In 2000 he was appointed the first New Zealand member of the World Intellectual Property Organization domain dispute panel. From 2000 to 2002 Barker was president of Arbitrators' & Mediators' Institute of New Zealand and from 2003 to 2019 chaired the Sir George Elliot Charitable Trust.

== Personal life and death ==
In 1965, Barker married Mary Christine Allardyce. Together they had two sons and three daughters. In retirement he helped provide remedial reading tuition to students at Otahuhu College.

Barker died on 11 November 2022, aged 88.

== Honours ==
Barker was appointed a Knight Bachelor in the 1994 New Year Honours. He received an honorary doctorate (LLD) from the University of Auckland in 1999.
