= 2004 Cook Islands parliamentary term referendum =

7 September 2004
- [_] I agree with the Constitution Amendment (No. 27) Bill which proposes that the term of parliament be reduced from 5 years to four (4) years. [_] I do not agree with the Constitution Amendment (No. 27) Bill.

Results
Choice	Votes	%
Agree	6,079	82.27%
Do not agree	1,310	17.73%
Valid votes	7,389	93.28%
Invalid or blank votes	532	6.72%
Total votes	7,921	100.00%
Registered voters/turnout	9,712	81.56%

A referendum on reducing the term length of Parliament from five to four years was held in the Cook Islands on 7 September 2004. It followed a referendum on the same subject in 1999 that was approved by a majority of voters, but not the two-thirds required to be passed. The proposal would amend article 37 of the constitution, which at the time read "The Queen's Representative shall dissolve Parliament at the expiration of 5 years from the date of the last preceding general election, if it has not sooner been dissolved." The change was approved by 82.27% of voters, passing the two-thirds threshold.

== Results ==
Choice	Votes	%
For	6,079	82.27
Against	1,310	17.73
Invalid/blank votes	532	–
Total	7,912	100
Registered voters/turnout	9,712	81.55
Source: Direct Democracy
