= Justice Savage =

Justice Savage may refer to:

- Albert R. Savage (1847–1917), justice of the Maine Supreme Judicial Court
- Patrick Savage (judge) (fl. 1990s–2010s), New Zealand judge who served as Chief Justice of Niue

== See also ==
- Judge Savage (disambiguation)
