= Patrick Keane (disambiguation) =

Patrick Keane (born 1952) is a Justice of the High Court of Australia and a former Chief Justice of the Federal Court of Australia.

Patrick Keane may also refer to:

- Patrick Keane (New Zealand judge), New Zealand judge, Chief Justice of the Cook Islands
- Patrick Keane (rower) (born 1997), Canadian rower
- Patrick Joseph James Keane (1872–1928), American Roman Catholic cleric, bishop of Sacramento
- Patrick Keane, American business executive, CEO of The Action Network

== See also ==
- Patrick Kane (born 1988), American ice hockey player
