= Laurence Greig =

New Zealand lawyer and jurist

The Honourable Laurie Greig

Inspector-General of Intelligence and Security
- In office 1996–2004
- Preceded by: None (office established)
- Succeeded by: Paul Neazor

4th Chief Justice of the Cook Islands
- In office 2000–2005
- Preceded by: Peter Quilliam
- Succeeded by: David Williams

Queen's Representative to the Cook Islands
- In office 14 November 2000 – 9 February 2001
- Monarch: Elizabeth II
- Prime Minister: Sir Terepai Maoate
- Preceded by: Sir Apenera Pera Short
- Succeeded by: Sir Frederick Tutu Goodwin

Personal details
- Born: 24 February 1929 (age 97)

Laurence Murray Greig (born 24 February 1929) is a New Zealand lawyer and jurist. He served as Chief Justice of the Cook Islands, a judge of the High Court of New Zealand, and as Inspector-General of Intelligence and Security.

Greig was born in Edinburgh, Scotland, and was educated at George Watson's College. He moved to Dunedin, New Zealand with his family as a teenager in 1946. He studied law at the University of Otago, then worked for Crown solicitors for five years before joining Bell Gully as a commercial lawyer. He was appointed as a judge of the High Court of New Zealand in 1979. He retired from the bench in May 1996.

== Inspector-General of Intelligence and Security ==
Greig was appointed the inaugural Inspector-General of Intelligence and Security upon retiring from the High Court in 1996. He was appointed for a further three-year term in 1999, and again in 2003. As Inspector-General, Greig investigated the actions of the New Zealand Security Intelligence Service in burgling the home of anti-free-trade activist Aziz Choudry and found them to be "lawful, reasonable and justified". In 2003, while he was responsible for reviewing the security risk certificate against Algerian refugee Ahmed Zaoui he gave an interview to the New Zealand Listener in which he said that if it were up to him, Zaoui would be "outski" on the next plane and that "we don't want lots of people coming in on false passports thrown down the loo on the plane, saying, 'I'm a refugee, keep me here'." In March 2004 he resigned after the High Court found that he had displayed apparent bias and disqualified him from the Zaoui case. He was replaced as Inspector-General by Paul Neazor.
