= Craig Coxhead =

New Zealand judge

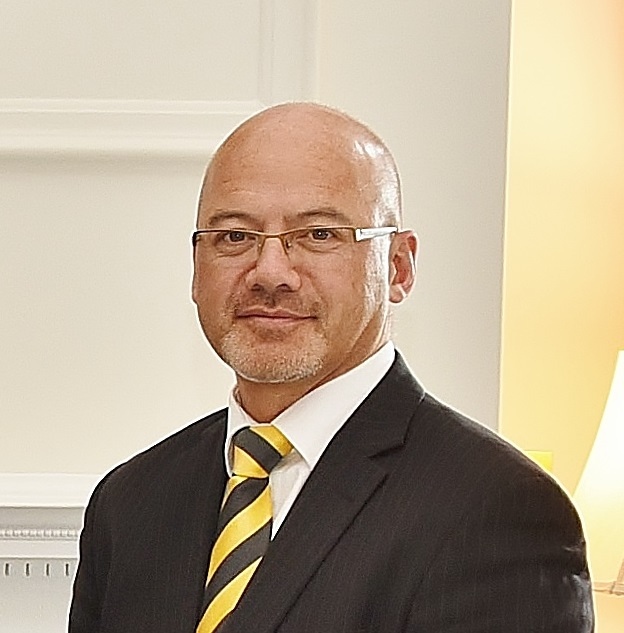
- Craig Coxhead in November 2018

Chief Justice of the High Court of Niue
- Incumbent
- Assumed office 22 November 2018
- Preceded by: Patrick Savage

Judge of the Māori Land Court
- Incumbent
- Assumed office 25 January 2008

Judge of the High Court of the Cook Islands
- Incumbent
- Assumed office 2016

Personal details
- Education: University of Waikato
- Occupation: Lawyer and jurist

Craig Coxhead is a New Zealand judge who is currently serving as Chief Justice of the High Court of Niue.

Coxhead graduated from the University of Waikato in 1994 with a Bachelor of Laws. He worked in private practice before becoming a lecturer at the University of Waikato Law School. He served as president of Te Huinga Roia Māori o Aotearoa – the New Zealand Māori Law Society.

Coxhead was appointed to the Māori Land Court on 25 January 2008. In 2011 he was appointed as a judge of the High Court of Niue, and in 2016 as a Justice of the High Court of the Cook Islands. He was appointed Chief Justice of Niue on 22 November 2018, replacing Patrick Savage. In May 2024, he was appointed Deputy Chief Judge of the Māori Land Court.

Court offices
Preceded by Patrick Savage	Chief Justice of Niue; 2018–present	Incumbent
