= Chief Justice of the Cook Islands =

Head of the Cook Islands judiciary

The Chief Justice of the Cook Islands is the head of the Cook Islands judiciary. They preside over the High Court of the Cook Islands and serve as a member of the Cook Islands Court of Appeal. The office was established by the Cook Islands Constitution.

The Chief Justice is appointed by the King's Representative on the advice of the Executive Council. They must be qualified to sit on the High Court, meaning that they must have either served as a justice of the High Court of New Zealand, the Court of Appeal of New Zealand, or the Supreme Court of New Zealand, or have practiced as a barrister in New Zealand or a country with an equivalent legal system for at least seven years. When the position of Chief Justice is vacant, or the holder is absent or incapacitated, the senior judge of the High Court serves as Acting Chief Justice.

The Chief Justice also acts in place of the King's Representative if that position is vacant or the appointee is absent or unable to perform their duties.

== List of office holders ==
- Sir Gaven Donne (1975–1982)
- Sir Graham Speight (1982–1988)
- Sir Peter Quilliam (1988–2000)
- Laurence Greig (2000–2005)
- David A R Williams (2005 – 13 May 2010)
- Tom Weston (from 13 May 2010 – 2016)
- Sir Hugh Williams (2016–2022)
- Patrick Keane (2022—)
