= Judge Savage =

Judge Savage may refer to:

- Royce H. Savage (1904–1993), judge of the United States District Court for the Northern District of Oklahoma
- Timothy J. Savage (born 1946), judge of the United States District Court for the Eastern District of Pennsylvania

== See also ==
- Justice Savage (disambiguation)
