= Hugh Kāwharu =

New Zealand academic

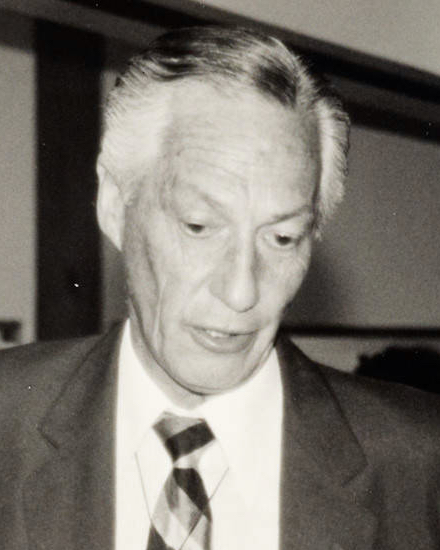
Kāwharu in 1990

Sir Ian Hugh Kāwharu ONZ (born Ian Hugh Paora; 18 February 1927 – 19 September 2006) was an academic and paramount chief of the Ngāti Whātua Māori tribe in New Zealand.

== Biography ==
Hugh was born to parents Janet née Anderson, an English physiotherapist, and Wiremu Paora in Ashburton, New Zealand, in 1927 and christened Ian Hugh Paora. While a child, his surname was changed from Paora to Kāwharu, in remembrance of his paternal great-grandfather Paora Kawharu (Hugh's grandfather had the patronym Hauraki Paora). Wiremu was a nephew of Ōtene Pāora.

Kāwharu attended Auckland Grammar School. He gained a BSc in geology and physics from the University of Auckland, an MA in anthropology from Cambridge University and an MLitt and DPhil from Oxford University.

In 1970, he became the foundation professor of social anthropology and Māori Studies at Massey University. Between 1985 and 1993 he was professor of Māori Studies and head of the Department of Anthropology at The University of Auckland, where he directed the building of the university's marae and was made an emeritus professor after he retired.

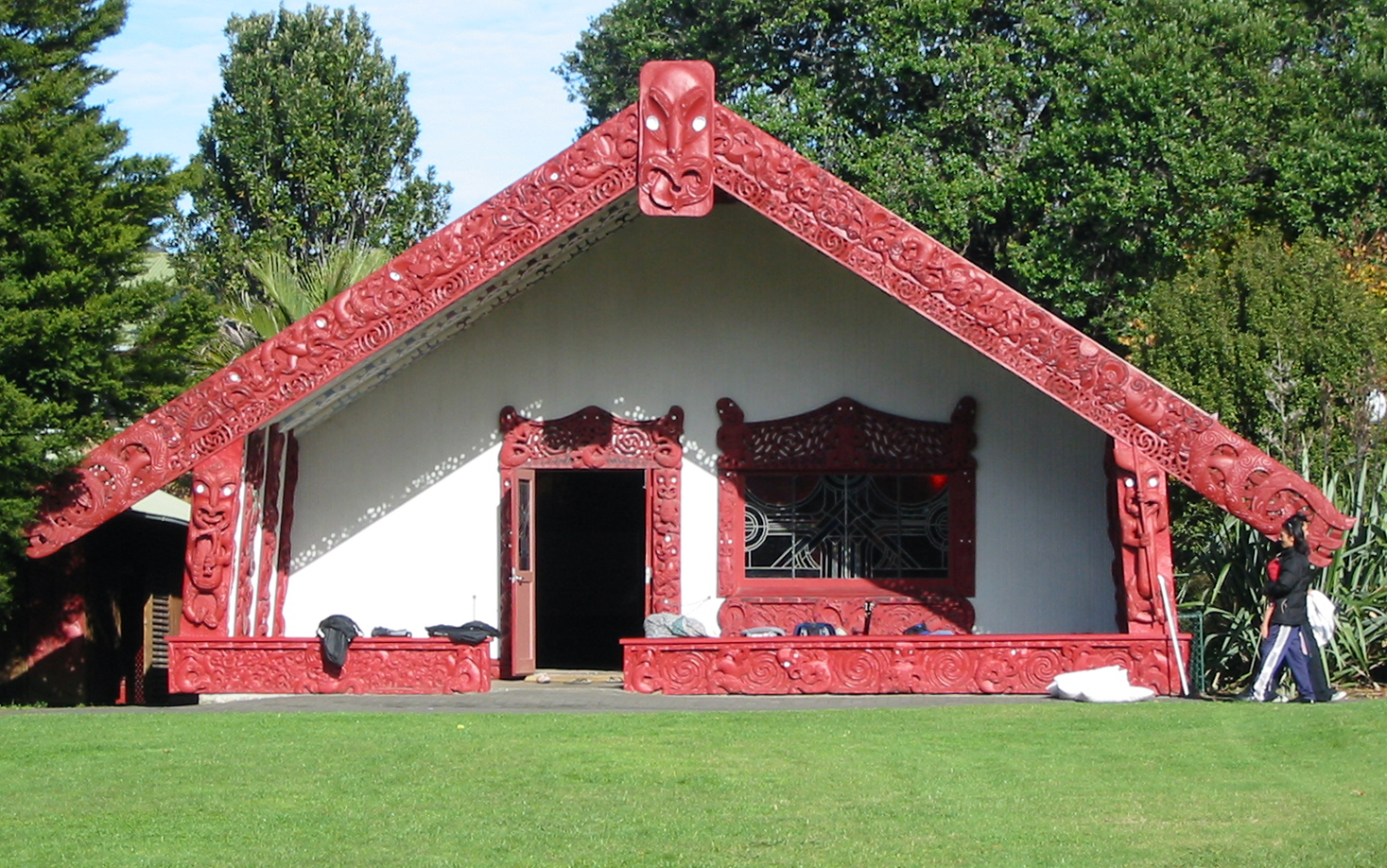
Waipapa marae, University of Auckland

He was chair of the Ngāti Whātua o Ōrākei Māori Trust Board from 1978 to 2006. He served on the Royal Commission of the Courts (1976–1978), the New Zealand Māori Council, the Board of Māori Affairs (1987–1990) and the Waitangi Tribunal (1986–1996). He was a New Zealand delegate to UNESCO and a consultant to the United Nations Economic and Social Council (ECOSOC) and the Food and Agriculture Organization (FAO). He was also President of the Polynesian Society.

In the 1989 Queen's Birthday Honours, Kāwharu was appointed a Knight Bachelor, for services to the Māori people. In 1992, he was awarded the Elsdon Best Memorial Medal by the Polynesian Society, and in 1994 was elected a Fellow of the Royal Society of New Zealand. In the 2002 Queen's Birthday and Golden Jubilee Honours, Kāwharu was appointed to the Order of New Zealand.

He was patron of the Pitt Rivers Museum and an honorary Fellow of Exeter College, Oxford.

Kāwharu authored the book, Māori Land Tenure: Studies of a changing institution, published in 1977, and was selected as one of the 180 most significant works of Māori-authored non-fiction.

Kāwharu died in Auckland in 2006. Merata Kawharu and Amokura Kawharu are two of his daughters.

== Works ==
Kāwharu, Hugh (1977). Māori Land Tenure: Studies of a Changing Institution. Oxford: Oxford University Press.
