= Patrick Keane (New Zealand judge) =

New Zealand judge

The Honourable Patrick Keane CNZM
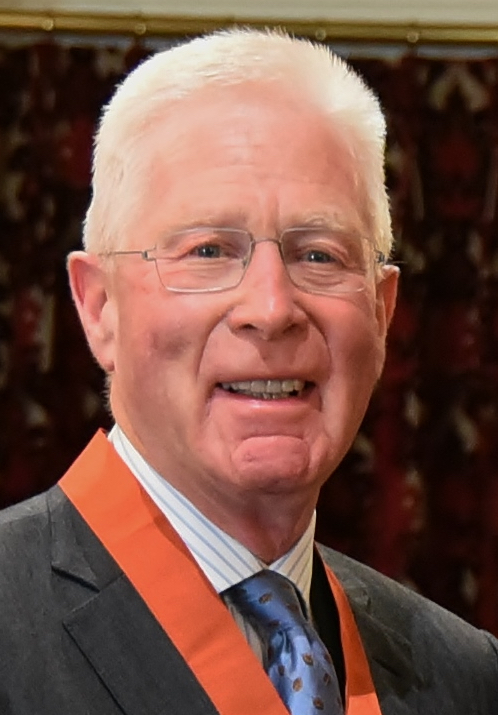
- Keane in 2017

8th Chief Justice of the Cook Islands
- Incumbent
- Assumed office 2022
- Preceded by: Hugh Williams

Personal details
- Born: Patrick John Keane
- Education: Victoria University of Wellington

Patrick John Keane CNZM is a retired New Zealand judge. In December 2022, he was appointed Chief Justice of the Cook Islands, replacing Hugh Williams.

Keane was educated at Victoria University of Wellington, graduating with a BA in 1968, and an LLB (Hons) in 1969. He then worked for as a lawyer for Izard Weston and later as a Crown Solicitor for Rudd Watts and Stone from 1977 to 1979. He was a legal adviser to the New Zealand government from 1980 to 1985, and a Crown Counsel for the Crown Law Office from 1985 to 1987. In 1987, he was appointed a judge of the District Court of New Zealand and to the Taxation Review Authority. From 2001 to 2003 he was a member of the New Zealand Law Commission.

In 2003, he was appointed a judge of the High Court of New Zealand. He retired in 2016, and was then appointed to the High Court of the Cook Islands.

In the 2017 New Year Honours he was appointed a Companion of the New Zealand Order of Merit (CNZM) for services to the judiciary.
