= Hugh Williams (judge) =

New Zealand judge (born 1939)

The Honourable Sir Hugh Williams KNZM KC
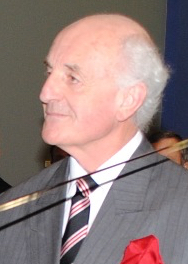
- Williams in 2010

7th Chief Justice of the Cook Islands
- In office 2016–2022
- Preceded by: Tom Weston
- Succeeded by: Patrick Keane

Personal details
- Born: John Hugh Williams; 23 September 1939 (age 87)
- Education: Victoria University of Wellington

Sir John Hugh Williams KNZM KC (born 23 September 1939), generally known as Hugh Williams, is a former president of the New Zealand Electoral Commission and a retired judge of the High Court of New Zealand. From 2016 to 2022, he was Chief Justice of the Cook Islands.

== Early life ==
Williams was educated at Wellington College and Gisborne Boys' High School, and graduated with an LLM (Hon) degree from Victoria University of Wellington.

== Career ==
Williams was appointed a Queen's Counsel in 1988 and a High Court Justice in 1997. He was the Senior Puisne Judge and was a Master (Associate Judge) of the High Court for 6 previous years. He was the longest serving Judge based at the High Court of New Zealand at Auckland for many years, until he retired on 22 September 2009.

Williams was the Criminal List Judge for Auckland, and presided over many high-profile trials, including the 2007 trials of Darin Gardner and Roger Kahui.

Williams was Chancellor of Massey University from 1990 to 1997, and a city councillor for Palmerston North City from 1983 to 1989. He is a former president of the New Zealand Law Society, and a current trustee of the Kea Conservation Trust. In 2009, he was appointed president of the Electoral Commission and succeeded Andrew McGechan. In 2010, he became chair of the new Electoral Commission.

After serving as a Cook Islands High Court judge from 2009, he was appointed the Chief Justice of the Cook Islands in 2016. He retired as Chief Justice in December 2022 and was replaced by Patrick Keane.

== Honours ==
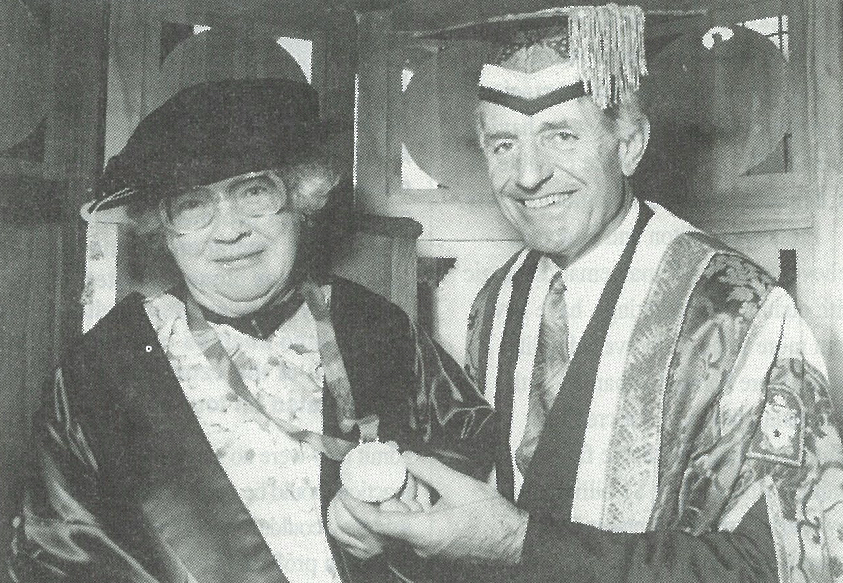
Williams in his capacity as Chancellor of Massey University with New Zealand author, Janet Frame. 1993

Williams was conferred an honorary doctorate (DLit) by Massey University in 1998. In the 2010 Queen's Birthday Honours, Williams was appointed an Additional Knight Companion of the New Zealand Order of Merit, for services as a judge.
