= Inspector-General of Intelligence and Security (New Zealand) =

New Zealand intelligence post

Inspector-General of the Office of the Inspector-General of Intelligence and Security (OIGIS)
- Incumbent; Brendan Horsley since 8 June 2020; 6 years ago
- Office of the Inspector-General of Intelligence and Security
- Appointer: Prime Minister of New Zealand
- Inaugural holder: Hon. Justice Laurence Greig
- Formation: 1996; 30 years ago
- Website: igis.govt.nz

The Inspector-General of Intelligence and Security (IGIS) is the official responsible for supervising New Zealand's two main intelligence agencies: the Security Intelligence Service (SIS) and the Government Communications Security Bureau (GCSB).

The current Inspector-General is Brendan Horsley, who commenced in the position in June 2020.

The Inspector-General and Deputy Inspector-General are both chosen by the Prime Minister, after consultation with the Leader of the Opposition.

Traditionally the office had been very small, but was expanded from 2014 onwards in response to controversies over unlawful activities to include a Deputy Inspector-General, two external advisors, and a number of investigation staff. That expansion was accompanied by some greater resourcing and a more intensive role, in particular with the addition of an own motion power of inquiry, and quickly resulted in a significantly larger number and depth of inquiries, including into systemic issues and matters of public controversy such as an incident involving adverse allegations arising from briefings claimed to have been given by the Security Intelligence Service to the Leader of the Opposition and the conduct of the agencies in parts of the conflict in Afghanistan. Senior political figures have at times criticised the extent of the broadened independent oversight that followed the 2014 reforms.

== Functions of the Inspector-General ==
The Inspector-General of Intelligence and Security (IGIS) is a statutory officer appointed under the Inspector-General of Intelligence and Security Act 1996. The position replaced an earlier Commissioner for Security Appeals, a position created in 1969.

The IGIS is an independent oversight body, with a broad function of assisting the Minister responsible for NZSIS and GCSB to ensure the activities of each agency comply with the law; ensure that complaints relating to these agencies are independently investigated; and review those bodies' compliance procedures and systems. Neither the National Assessments Bureau nor the Directorate of Defence Intelligence and Security are under the oversight of the role.

The Inspector-General does not have a management role in the NZSIS or GCSB and cannot order them to take, or to cease, any activity - the role is limited to reporting concerns and findings to the Minister, who ultimately is responsible for corrective action. Reports are also made public, so far as possible, as are steps to implement recommendations.

The Inspector-General conducts inquiries into matters of concern, including individual complaints, and reports consequent findings and recommendations to the Minister. Those reports, excluding information withheld because of security concerns, may be found on the Inspector-General's website. The Inspector-General also makes a report each year to the Minister. A copy of that report, excluding material of security concern or which may cause danger is presented to Parliament. A copy, without deletions, must be given to the Leader of the Opposition.

Details on how to make a complaint to the Inspector-General can be found under the Complaints section of the website.

== List of Inspectors-General ==
- Hon. Justice Laurence Greig (1996–2004)
- Hon. Justice Paul Neazor QC (2004–2013)
- Hon. Justice Andrew McGechan CNZM QC (2013–2014)
- Hon. Justice Cheryl Gwyn (2014–2019)
- Madeleine Laracy (acting 2019–2020)
- Brendan Horsley (2020–present)

== List of Deputy Inspectors-General ==
- Ben Keith (2014-2017)
- Madeleine Laracy (2017-2019)
- Graeme Speden (2020–present)

== See also ==
- Inspector-General of Intelligence and Security (Australia)
- Central Intelligence Agency Office of Inspector General
