= Law of Vanuatu =

Law in the Republic of Vanuatu consists of a mixed system combining the legacy of English common law, French civil law and indigenous customary law. The Parliament of Vanuatu is the primary law-making body today, but pre-independence French and British statutes, English common law principles and indigenous custom all enjoy constitutional and judicial recognition to some extent.

== Historical origins ==
Vanuatu did not exist as a politically, judicially or even conceptually unified entity prior to its being named the "New Hebrides" by James Cook in 1774, and subsequently its joint colonisation by France and the United Kingdom in 1906. The French and British established a condominium, whereby separate but coexisting French and British colonial authorities would administer their own settlers, as well as settlers of other nationalities who placed themselves under the jurisdiction of either administration. Joint regulations were also issued, some of which affecting the indigenous inhabitants. For the most part, however, indigenous Neo-Hebrideans simply remained outside the jurisdiction of colonial administration, which de facto considered that indigenous custom was sufficient to regulate the "native" societies, albeit without granting custom any official recognition. In addition to specific colonial regulations issued by the High Commissioner for the Western Pacific, the British Resident Commissioner in the New Hebrides, and the French High Commissioner of the Pacific, as well as joint condominial regulations, applicable law in the colonial New Hebrides included acts of the French Parliament stated to apply to the New Hebrides, or to French colonial territories generally, acts of the British Parliament stated or deemed to apply to the colonies, and "English rules of common law and equity", all except where inappropriate to the specific circumstances of the New Hebrides.

Thus, when the New Hebrides became independent as the Republic of Vanuatu in 1980, they had not inherited any unified legal system from the colonial period, and nor had they any unified precolonial legal tradition to refer back to.

== Constitution ==
The Constitution of Vanuatu, which came into effect upon the country's formal accession to independence on July 30, 1980, establishes the bases of the country's law. Art.2 defines the Constitution as the supreme law of the country. Articles 15 and 16 create a Parliament as the Republic's legislative body. Art.47 establishes the judiciary, the function of which is to "resolve proceedings according to law. If there is no rule of law applicable to a matter before it, a court shall determine the matter according to substantial justice and whenever possible in conformity with custom." Art.95 states that pre-independence "Joint Regulations and subsidiary legislation", as well as any "British and French laws in force or applied in Vanuatu" at the time of independence, continue to apply "with such adaptations as may be necessary to bring them into conformity with the Constitution", and (in the English version of the Constitution) "wherever possible taking due account of custom", until and unless repealed by Parliament. Art.95(3) stipulates that "[c]ustomary law shall continue to have effect as part of the law of the Republic of Vanuatu", without specifying any restrictive clauses thereupon. Art.95 has been interpreted as recognising the continuance of English common law and principles of equity as well as British and colonial statutes.

The French version of art.95 (labelled art.93), which has equal force with the English text, states that French and British laws in force at the time of independence continue to have effect insofar as they are compatible with custom. Thus the English text gives pre-eminence to colonial statutes over custom, while the French text provides the reverse. This contradiction has not been resolved, though in practice, courts have chosen to apply pre-independence statutes in preference to custom.

For the sake of clarification, in 1988, the Revised Laws of Vanuatu were adopted, intended to "have effect as a consolidation and as declaratory of the written laws" applicable in the country.

== Codes ==
Criminal and civil procedures are codified in a Civil Procedure Code and a Criminal Procedure Code, adopted shortly after independence.

== Custom ==
Customary law in Vanuatu is, by its very nature, diverse, as each community has its own customs. Thus customary law is applied primarily by local courts. In 1983, the Island Courts Act created courts with jurisdiction to hear minor civil and criminal cases in accordance with local custom, "so far as the same is not in conflict with any written law and is not contrary to justice, morality and good order".

== Courts ==
Island Courts deal with minor civil and criminal cases, as well as all cases pertaining to ownership of land. Magistrate's Courts may hear certain criminal and civil cases in first instance, and hear appeals from Island Courts, except in land ownership cases (for which appeals lie directly to the Supreme Court). The Supreme Court has "unlimited jurisdiction to hear and determine civil and criminal proceedings", and hears appeals from the Magistrate's Courts. The Court of Appeal "has the same power, authority and jurisdiction as the Supreme Court" and hears appeals from the latter. The Court of Appeal is "constituted by two or more judges of the Supreme Court sitting together", per art.50 of the Constitution.

The Supreme Court has jurisdiction to provide binding interpretations of the Constitution, per art.53(3) thereof, which provides: "When a question concerning the interpretation of the Constitution arises before a subordinate court, and the court considers that the question concerns a fundamental point of law, the court shall submit the question to the Supreme Court for its determination."

=== Public Solicitor of Vanuatu ===
In the original Constitution of Vanuatu, Article 54 called for the establishment of a Public Solicitor of the Republic of Vanuatu. The Public Solicitor's Act of 1984 made further provisions by ensuring that the person filling the position was a legal practitioner. Chapter 177 (1988) of the Laws of the Republic of Vanuatu would further outline the functions of the Public Solicitor. The Public Solicitor is to provide legal assistance to needy individuals or to any person when directed by the Supreme Court of Vanuatu. The office is dependent on graduate lawyers who do not possess the two-year requirement necessary to practice before any court of law in Vanuatu. The Public Solicitor Act was amended again in 2016.

Public Solicitor of Vanuatu (Incomplete Table)
Name	Term
Oliver Saksak	c. 1985–1986
Gerald Rissen	c. 1987–1996
Henzler Vira Hillary Toa	c. 2007–2009
Jacob Kausiama	c. 2011–2014

=== Public Prosecutor of Vanuatu ===
The Office of the Public Prosecutor of the Republic of Vanuatu commenced in 2003 and is governed by the Public Prosecutor's Act [CAP 293]. Whereas the Public Prosecutor has no authority to direct a police investigation, s/he can serve in an advisory capacity. The decision to prosecute is dependent upon the completion of the evidential test.

Public Prosecutor of Vanuatu (Complete Table)
Name	Term
Nicholas Mirou	c. 2003–2005
Kayleen Tavoa (1st female)	c. 2005–2014
Josiah Naigulevu	c. 2015-

== Co-existence of French and British law ==
In those rare cases in which French and British laws applicable in Vanuatu may contradict each other, Chief Justice Vaudin d'Imecourt reasoned in Banga v Waiwo (1996) that the courts should "find a solution in conformity with the rules of equity".

In practice, courts have tended to strongly favour the maintaining of English legal procedures. Case law, an English legal principle, applies in Vanuatu, enabling judges to shape the law through their rulings and interpretations, and to create binding legal precedents. English common law precedents are applied in preference to other legal sources. Chief Justice Vaudin d'Imecourt has explained this by the fact that an overwhelming majority of legal professionals in Vanuatu are trained in common law, and thus have little or no training in French law (or ni-Vanuatu custom).

== Co-existence of custom and other sources of law ==
Miranda Forsyth, of the University of the South Pacific, has argued that custom (known in Bislama as kastom) is de facto ignored by courts, and solely (and unofficially) "administered by communities and chiefs". She notes that judges have been reluctant to apply it not only because they are trained in common law, but also because they have considered custom, which is inherently local, to be ill-suited for application in national courts, where the principle of stare decisis might give one local custom binding force throughout the country.

== See also ==
- History of Vanuatu
- Court of Appeal of Vanuatu
- Supreme Court of Vanuatu
- Law enforcement in Vanuatu
