= Paul Tapsell =

New Zealand academic

Paul / Paora John Tohiteururangi Tapsell
- Paora Tapihana
- Born: Ōtautahi / Christchurch
- Citizenship: Aotearoa New Zealand
- Education: University of Auckland, University of Oxford
- Known for: Museum Ethnography, Indigenous Anthropology, Climate impacts on Pacific kin-communities
- Spouse: Prof Merata Kawharu MNZM, FRSNZ
- Children: Two
- Awards: CRSNZ, Eisenhower Fellow
- Scientific career
- Fields: Museums & Universities
- Workplaces: Rotorua Museum, Australian National University, Auckland Museum, University of Auckland, University of Otago, Victoria Museum, Melbourne, University of Melbourne, Lincoln University
- Patrons: Kuru-o-te-Marama Waaka, Dame Te Atairangikaahu, Sir John Antony Hood, Sir Tumu Te Heuheu
- Thesis: Taonga : a tribal response to museums (1998)
- Doctoral advisor: Prof Howard Morphy, Prof Chris Gosden
- Other academic advisors: Prof Ranginui Walker, Dame Anne Salmond,Hamuera Taipōrutu Mitchell, Dr Hikooterangi Hohepa, Dame Bubbles Mihinui, Sir Hugh Kawharu, Dame Te Aue Davis, Sir Paul Reeves

Paul Tapsell CRSNZ is a New Zealand academic, of Ngāti Whakaue and Raukawa descent and as of 2025, Professor and Director of the Kāika Institute of Climate Resilience at Lincoln University. His doctorate in Museum Ethnography was gained at the Pitt Rivers Museum, Faculty of Anthropology and Geography, Oxford. Tapsell completed a Postdoctoral fellowship at the Australian National University before taking up a dual position of Director Māori at Auckland Museum and Senior Lectureship (Social Anthropology) at University of Auckland. During his tenure he curated the Ko Tawa touring exhibition project as well as establishing the Museums & Cultural Heritage Postgraduate Programme at University of Auckland. In 2009 Tapsell was appointed Professor and Chair of Māori Studies and Dean of Te Tumu School of Māori, Pacific and Indigenous Studies at the University of Otago.

In 2024 Tapsell was elected a Companion of the Royal Society Te Apārangi, for "his far-reaching innovation, commitment, and leadership within Māori communities".

== Selected works ==
- Abram, Ruth J., Joanne DiCosimo, Stephen H. Baumann, Michele Gallant, Emlyn H. Koster, Gillian Kydd, Susan Pointe et al. Looking reality in the eye: Museums and social responsibility. University of Calgary Press, 2005.
- Tapsell, Paul, and Christine Woods. "Social entrepreneurship and innovation: Self-organization in an indigenous context." Entrepreneurship and Regional Development 22, no. 6 (2010): 535–556.
- Tapsell, Paul. "The flight of Pareraututu: An investigation of taonga from a tribal perspective." The Journal of the Polynesian Society 106, no. 4 (1997): 323–374.
- Tapsell, Paul, and Christine Woods. "A spiral of innovation framework for social entrepreneurship: Social innovation at the generational divide in an indigenous context." Emergence: Complexity and Organization 10, no. 3 (2008): 25.
- Tapsell, Paul. "Taonga: A tribal response to museums." University of Oxford, 1998.
