= New Zealand Law Commission =

Crown entity

Law Commission
- Te Aka Matua o te Ture

Agency overview
- Formed: 1 February 1986
- Headquarters: Wellington, New Zealand
- Motto: Kia whanake ngā ture o Aotearoa mā te arotake motuhake | Better law for Aotearoa New Zealand through independent review
- Employees: 21.3 FTE (2023)
- Annual budget: 4.33m NZ$ (2024)
- Minister responsible: Paul Goldsmith, Minister of Justice
- Agency executive: Judith Collins, President
- Key document: Te Tauākī Whakamaunga Atu Statement of Intent 1 July 2023 – 30 June 2027
- Website: lawcom.govt.nz

New Zealand's Law Commission (Māori: Te Aka Matua o te Ture lit. 'The Main Root of Law') was established in 1986 by the Law Commission Act 1985. The commission is an independent Crown entity as defined in the Crown Entities Act 2004.

The main objective of the Law Commission, as declared in its founding legislation, is to monitor and critically analyse the laws of New Zealand with a view to identifying—and proposing solutions to—their possible shortcomings. The Law Commission reviews, reforms and develops New Zealand law. It then makes recommendations to the Government to improve the law. It also advises its Responsible Minister and government agencies on how to make the law more accessible and easier to understand.

The commission has a commitment to consult the public on areas of law that it reviews. It promotes discussion and consultation by publishing Issues Papers. It invites submissions from the public before it makes recommendations to the Responsible Minister. It publishes these recommendations in a report to Parliament. The Minister tables the report and the government then decides whether and how it will amend the law.

The commission is part of the Commonwealth Association of Law Reform Agencies (CALRAs). CALRAs aims to, among other objectives, provide training in law reform, engage with governments to seek high quality law reform, and maintain strong relations with relevant legal organisations. The organisation also holds regular international conferences.

In 2001, the commission published a notable report on the influence tikanga Māori on Pākehā law conventions.

== Current commissioners ==
As of February 2026, the Law Commission comprises three commissioners:

- Dr Mark Hickford (President)
- Claudia Geiringer
- Geof Shirtcliffe

== History ==
=== Predecessors ===
The Law Commission was not New Zealand’s first law reform body. Prior to the creation of the Law Commission in 1985 a number of other law reform bodies existed. The first dedicated law reform body in New Zealand was the Law Revision Committee which was established in 1937 by Rex Mason, the Attorney General. It was created on the recommendation of the 1936 New Zealand Law Conference and inspired by the English Law Revision committee, which had been established three years earlier.

The Law Revision Committee was chaired by the Attorney General and Minister of Justice. The committee’s large membership was otherwise made up of lawyers from government and private practice, as well as academics. Notably no judges where on the committee.

In 1965 the Law Revision Committee was replaced by a new system of law reform, a Law Revision Commission and five standing Law Reform Committees. The Law Revision Commission was chaired by the Minister of Justice and members included the Solicitor General, deans of the university law schools, representatives from the legal profession and a judge. The standing Law Reform Committees each had six to ten members from the legal profession, as well as a representative from the Department of Justice and Parliamentary Council Office. Each Law Reform Committee focused on a different specialist area of law, with a separate committee for property and equity law, contracts and commercial law, public administrative law, torts and general law and criminal law.

The specialised committees did not report back to the Law Revision Commission, reporting directly to the Minster of Justice instead. While these committees did most of the substantive work of law reform, the Law Revision Commission’s role was meant to be to “overview initiate and recommend on polices and priorities”. However, the members of the Law Revision Commission wanted to focus more on reviewing, improving and criticising the work of the Law Reform Committees. This slowed down the progress of their reports. This lack of clarity around its purpose made the body ineffective and, while it was smaller than the preceding Law Revision Committee, it was still large. These critiques lead to it being replaced in 1975 by the Law Reform Council.

The Law Reform Council had only nine members; the chairmen of each of the law reform committees, the Solicitor General, the Minister of Justice and Chief Parliamentary Counsel. This body focused more on an oversight than its predecessor, helping coordinate the work of the five law reform committees who still did the bulk of substantive law reform.

This system of law reform successfully produced a large number of reports, with the Law Reform Committees’ producing 150 reports between them and the suggestions having high legislative uptake. Despite this, the system was seen as unsatisfactory. Everyone that worked on the Law Reform Committees was also practising or working for the government, so time was limited. This meant the committees were not able to undertake large scale or detailed law reform and reports tended to be brief or slow to produce. The part time nature of the committees also meant public communication was not prioritised. As Sir Geoffrey Palmer put it “ over all was the shadow of lack of time and resources”.

The segregation of law reform into five committees also hindered large scale law reform that spanned multiple areas of law. This drove a focus on purely legal issues rather than larger scale social reform. While the Law Reform council attempted to coordinate the work of the committees, there was still a lack of an overall plan or agenda for law reform. These issues eventually contributed to the demise of the Law Reform Council and standing Law Reform committees and they were replaced with the current system of law reform in 1985.

=== Establishment of the Law Commission ===
The Law Commission was established in 1985 by the fourth labour government. Its establishment was a part of the party’s election manifesto and focus on open government. It responded to pressure from the Law Society, which had been lobbying for a full time law reform body. The Law Society’s support for this new system was evident in its President’s address to the select committee on the Law Commission bill. The President stated that the Society “acknowledges the importance of the bill as a major step forward in the task of law reform and that the effective performance of that task is essential to new Zealand’s social progress and welfare.”

The Law Commission Act 1985 created a full-time Law Commission to act as a “central advisory body for the review, reform, and development of the law of New Zealand” and replace the separate Law Reform Committees that had done the bulk of law reform in the preceding 48 years. This crown entity would have three to six members each appointed for a five-year term. The first president of the Law Commission was Sir Owen Woodhouse and the other original members were Sir Kenneth Keith, Dame Sian Elias, Jack Hodder and Mr. B Cameron.

=== Modifications to the Law Commission ===
No major changes have occurred to New Zealand’s law reform machinery since the creation of the Law Commission in 1985. However, some more minor changes have occurred to the way the Law Commission interacts with the rest of Government in efforts to improve its performance. The Commission’s President has also been given the additional responsibility of certifying revision bills.

Most of these changes were driven by the Law Commission’s own recommendations in its August 2000 Annual report. The report expressed concern at a lack of uptake of the Commission’s recommendations, saying that “an average of one significant statue a year is not really good enough for a body of this character”. Criticism about the lack of cooperation and coordination between the Law Commission and other government agencies could also have driven these changes. For example, the Commission published a report on Intellectual property in 1990 while the Department of Justice and the Ministry of Commerce were also working on reform in this area.

To increase the uptake of the Commission’s recommendations, the report suggested three key changes. Firstly, it suggested that the House of Representatives should have to respond to the Law Commission’s reports within six months of receiving them. Secondly, it requested that the Parliamentary Counsel Office should have funding to draft any bills required to enact the Law Commission’s recommendations. It was hoped that if this was done the Government would have more confidence that measures recommended by the Commission were professionally drafted and met legislative requirements.Thirdly, it proposed that there should be a Minister responsible for law reform whose portfolio included the Law Commission. This was so that there would be a greater Government focus on law reform.

These changes where implemented. The Government adopted a practice of responding to reports within six months of their release. Funding was provided to the Parliamentary Counsel Office to draft Law Commission bills. This was highlighted in their 2006-2009 statement of intent which states that “Drafters are already working with the Commission and the Ministry of Justice on drafting Bills to implement existing reports and are likely to draft Bills to implement further reports of the Commission”. Lastly the Law Commission Amendment Act 2002 changed the language of the Act to allow for there to be a Minister whose portfolio included responsibility for the Law Commission.

In 2007 the Government’s practice of responding to the Law Commission’s reports within six months changed to be more efficient. The Minster responsible for the Law Commission would now submit a Cabinet paper on the Law Commission’s recommendations. This paper would be prepared by the Law Commission on the Minster’s behalf reflecting the views of the Minster and all relevant agencies. If Cabinet accepted the recommendations, it would invite the relevant Minster or the Law Commission itself to issue drafting instructions and add the bill to the legislative program. If this occurred, no other formal Government response was needed.

However, if the recommendations where rejected would the Government have to formally respond by presenting a paper to the House of Representatives within 120 working days of the Commission’s report. The then Prime Minister Helen Clark hoped that this change would “ensure law reform proposals are considered in a timely fashion and in general should result in legislation being introduced expeditiously”.

In 2009 this process was adjusted slightly so that the Minster whose portfolio included law reform would determine which agency prepares the cabinet paper instead of the default being the Law Commission. The process for selecting projects for the Law Commission also changed. In 2007 instructions were issued requiring projects for the annual Law Commissions work program to be agreed upon by Cabinet. In 2009 the instructions removed this requirement with the Minister responsible for the Law Commission being able to set the program without it needing to be approved by Cabinet. The criteria for projects to be added to the program was laid out in these instructions to ensure projects selected suit the purpose of the Law Commission and had the support of relevant portfolio’s Minister.

All of this tweaking seems to have been successful. There are now higher rates of adoption of the Commission’s reports, with approximately 75-80% of its recommendations being adopted. However, these improvements cannot be tied directly to any one change in practice or structure and could be due to other factors. For example, factors such as changes in the political and economic climate, changing membership of the Commission and the topics the Commission focused on.

The most recent change to the Law Commission was made in 2012. The Commission President was given the additional responsibility of certifying revision bills. Revision bills are prepared by the Parliamentary Council Office. They are not intended to change the substantive content of the law but simply to update it, so it has more modern plain language and follows current formats and drafting styles. The Legislation Act 2012 states that such bills must be certified before introduction. This is done by a panel that includes the President of the Law Commission, the Solicitor-General, a retired High Court Judge, and the Chief Parliamentary Counsel.

Some propose that further changes should be made to make the Law Commission more efficient and effective. In a 2014 speech at Auckland University Sir Peter Blanchard proposed a separate parliamentary process for Law Commission projects so that they could be considered by Parliament more quickly. This process would allow law reform bills to bypass a first reading and proceed straight to the select committee stage. He also suggested that speeches at the third reading should be kept short. However, this proposal has not been implemented to date.

== Process ==
The New Zealand Law Commission has a set process established by the Cabinet Office in 2009. This process consists of: 1. Initiation of Law Reform projects 2. Early Project Stages 3. Research and Advisory Input 4. Public Consultation and Analysis 5. Final Recommendations 6. Presentation of Law Reform Reports and Consideration by the Executive All throughout this process it is important for the organisation to maintain overarching independence from the executive.

=== Initiating Law Reform Projects ===
The content that comprises most of the organisation’s law reform reviews are referred by the Minister responsible for the Law Commission. This minister will have consulted with other members of the executive and will later approve an annual programme.

If a Law Reform Report project was proposed because of consultation with a Minister, they should be contained in the programme. These ministers are referred to as relevant portfolio Ministers. The burden on these relevant departments brought on by a project must be considered by the Minister responsible for the Law Commission.

As well as from input by the executive, the Commission is able to identify and propose potential law reform areas based on public consultation and independent research. It is an available power of the Law Commission to initiate projects for itself.

=== Early Project Stages ===
Once a project is approved, a channel for resources and communication between the Law Commission and the relevant Ministerial departments should be created and maintained. This provides continuous advisory and executive monitoring.

The initial step to a project is to establish terms of reference with the aim of defining the scope of the project. The public is kept informed on this process and the larger project through a self-subscription service through their website, allowing for another channel of continual stakeholder input.

=== Research and Advisory Input ===
The project team within the Law Commission conducts detailed research to ensure the following goals are met: i. The current state of the law in the area for reform is known. Comparative jurisdictions have been considered. ii. Terms of reference are within the right scope and focus. iii. The correct issues are identified and assessed. iv. Possible options for reform on which to be consulted are identified. v. Solid foundations of evidence and analysis form the final recommendations. vi. Academic and public commentary has been considered. vii. Relevant demographic data has been taken into account. viii. Tikanga, te ao Māori, and Māori perspectives have been taken into account through public consultation and the Māori Liaison Committee.

The project research team is usually appointed by the Law Commission and are usually leading experts with professional experience relevant to the area of law being reviewed. Occasionally, an additional advisory group/s like Government officials, judicial panel or lived experience expert groups can be appointed to the research team.

=== Public Consultation and Analysis ===
After the completion of research and advisory input, the law Commission will publish one or more issue papers, outlining to key stakeholders the main issues in consideration as well as possible options for reform. There is then an invitation for the public to give feedback on these papers through submission. This feedback informs further research and which options for reform to explore or abandon.

=== Final Recommendations ===
The public consultation and analysis step will eventually create the product of the Law Commission’s final recommendations. These recommendations are then compiled into a final report which is submitted to the Minister responsible for the Law Commission and through them Parliament.

=== Presentation of Law Reform Reports and Consideration by the Executive ===
Once the final recommendations in the form of a report have been received by the responsible Minister for the Law Commission, and the relevant portfolio Minister, a cabinet paper will be drafted as soon as possible. This paper will reflect the views of the Minister and all relevant agencies, highlighting where there is contention between parties . There are options presented to the portfolio Minister in deciding who is to prepare the draft cabinet paper: i. Portfolio Minister’s department or other agency. ii. An agency and the Law Commission together. iii. The Law Commission in consultation with all relevant agencies. iv. Any alternative matter (wide discretion).

The Government then reviews and decides on whether to implement the Law Commission’s suggestions. Depending on acceptance or refusal, there are differing obligations on the Government.

If the Government is to accept the recommendations, then it may go through the House of Representatives in the form of a Bill and become new legislation or amendments to existing laws. If the Government refuses to follow the recommendations, a report outlining the reasons for this refusal must be prepared.

=== Independence and Accountability ===
There are many checks that the Law Commission uses to maintain independence and a degree of separation between the organization and Government.

The first of these measures is the requirement for the Government to prepare a formal response, usually within 120 days from presentation of the final report, addressed to the Commission outlining their reasoning behind their decision around actioning their recommendations. They can choose not to do this if they accept the recommendations. The Law Commission then posts the formal response publicly to maintain public scrutiny and transparency.

A degree of separation is maintained through a clear line drawn in the Commission’s jurisdiction. The Commission is strictly not involved in the implementation of proposed law once it has been received in the form of the Commission’s final report. From then on, the only powers that intertwine between the Commission and the Government is the Commission’s monitoring power and their role in maintaining public accountability.

== Projects ==
=== Company Law ===
Project dates 5 September 1986 – 4 September 1990.

Reports: NZLC R9 and NZLC R16

The Commission was asked to review the law relating to bodies incorporated under the Companies Act 1955 and report on the form and content of a new Companies Act.

NZLC R9 recommended a draft Companies Act governing the creation, operation and termination of all companies to replace the 1955 Act.

The Commission’s second report, NZLC R16, contained recommendations for improvements to the draft legislation, having received comments on NZLC R9 and the draft legislation recommended. NZLC R16 also contained drafts of transitional and consequential legislation required for the reform to be implemented.

The Commission’s recommendations were implemented in the Companies Act 1993, the Receiverships Act 1993 and amendments to the Property Law Act 1952 (repealed) and the Companies Act 1955 (repealed).

=== Courts ===
Project dates 1 December 1987 – 20 March 1989.

Report: NZLC R7

For this project, the Commission reviewed the structure of the judicial system in New Zealand including the composition, jurisdiction and operation of the various courts. The Commission was also asked to recommend a new judicial structure in the event the Privy Council ceased to be the final appellate court for New Zealand.

The report recommended three courts of general jurisdiction being the District Court, High Court and Supreme Court with the District and High Courts continuing as the courts of original jurisdiction and the High and Supreme Courts operating as appellate courts.

The Commission’s recommendations were reflected in reforms of the courts’ jurisdiction in 1991 and 1992.

=== Women and access to justice ===
Project dates 1 July 1996 – 28 June 1999.

Study Paper: NZLC SP1

This project reviewed the related issues of whether New Zealand women were being treated properly by the legal system and whether the New Zealand citizen has sufficient access to legal services and advices as to enable access to justice. In particular, the Commission examined the impact of laws, legal procedures and the delivery of legal services to:

- Family and domestic relationships;
- Violence against women; and
- The economic position of women.

The study paper reported to the Minister of Justice on law reforms, principles and processes to be followed by policy and lawmakers and other strategies to promote the fair treatment of women by the legal system.

=== Māori customary law ===
Project dates 1 December 2000 – 28 March 2001.

Study paper: NZLC SP9

This project was initially commenced in 1994 on the recommendation of the Chief Judge of the Māori Land Court, Sir Edward Durie, to improve knowledge of Māori custom to assist judges in carrying out their judicial functions. The paper was released on 28 March 2001.

The paper examined how Māori customs and values impacted current law and considered ideas for future law reform projects by the Commission to implement Māori values in the laws of New Zealand.

The report is made up of six chapters and two appendices.

Chapter 1 of the report gives an introduction as to the purpose of the paper, gives some basic terminology to custom law (especially that of dynamic Māori custom law), and sets out the structure of the study.

Chapter 2 of the report explores the concept of indigenous custom law, Common Law's treatment of them, and the doctrine of aboriginal rights. The paper touches on native title, exploring domestic cases such as R v Symonds, Wi Parata v Bishop of Wellington, and, more recently, Te Runanganui o te Ika Whenua Inc Society v Attorney-General. The study also explores international cases, such as in Canada, the United States, and the Mabo case in Australia.

Chapter 3 of the report looks at Māori custom law (referred to as tikanga Māori) and investigates evolving colonial attitudes and treatment of Māori custom law by the courts and Parliament. It also provides a series of explanations regarding the values that underlie tikanga. It argues that, although English law tends to espouse legal positivism, early visitors to New Zealand had little-to-no difficulty in identifying the existence and coherence of Māori custom as law. It further discusses the government’s complicated history with Māori custom law, beginning with its explicit denial in Wi Parata v Bishop of Wellington, its suppression within the Tohunga Suppression Act 1907, the alteration of Māori social structures (such as Māori customary rights for land), and the removal of resource to which Māori custom law is applied (such as fisheries). The paper also explains the different values that underpin tikanga tangata (social organisation), tikanga rangatira (leadership), and tikanga whenua (land).

Chapter 4 of the report discusses the evolution of the Māori Land Court. Referencing work from the Succession Law Project, the paper demonstrates some of the difficulties faced by the Court in relation to the complexities of Māori custom law.

Chapter 5 of the report deals with the Treaty of Waitangi, law that has developed from this, and some of the issues that have arisen from references to the Treaty or its principles in legislation. The section deals with the legal significance of the Treaty and the Waitangi Tribunal. In particular, the paper sets out the structure and jurisdiction of the Waitangi Tribunal, highlights tribunal processes and claims, and touches on the treaty principles and references to the Treaty in legislation.

Chapter 6 of the report explores options for future work for the Law Commission to move New Zealand closer to a system of law that is shaped by the philosophies and traditions of both English law and Māori custom law.

Appendices A and B cover the history of the Custom Law Project and Succession Law Project respectively.

The He Poutama study paper, published on 21 September 2023, acknowledges this report as having “an enduring influence on the consideration of tikanga in both legal and policy contexts and remains one of our most frequently cited publications”. He Poutama itself is a similar review on the “ongoing interaction of tikanga and state law”, especially considering the significant developments of those interactions since the original 2001 paper.

=== Maximum Penalties ===
Project dates: 1 February 2007 – 28 September 2013.

Study paper: NZLC SP21

The Commission commenced a review of the maximum penalties contained in five key criminal statues (Crimes Act 1961, Misuse of Drugs Act 1975, Land Transport Act 1998, Arms Act 1983, and Summary Offences Act 1981). The review aimed to correct penalty anomalies and reflect changes regarding the automatic release of offenders. The project was not completed due to a change in government priorities so a study paper was published to utilise initial work and research. The study paper did not contain any recommendations.

=== Review of Surrogacy ===
Project dates: 23 November 2020 – 27 May 2022

Report: NZLC R146

The Government asked the Commission to conduct a review of surrogacy in Aotearoa New Zealand.

The Commission found that the state of surrogacy law in New Zealand was outdated and there was an acute need for reform. The report made 63 recommendations to establish a new framework for determining legal parenthood I surrogacy arrangement and otherwise improving surrogacy law and practice. Recommendations addressed reforms to pathways and processes for recognising intended parents as legal parents, the establishment of a national surrogacy birth register, allowing payment of surrogates reasonable costs and commissioning Māori lead research to provide a better understanding of tikanga Māori and Māori perspectives on surrogacy.

=== Law of Trusts ===
Project dates 14 March 2009 – 11 September 2013.

Report: NZLC R130

This project reviewed the Trustees Act 1956 and trust law generally.

The Commission’s report recommended the introduction of a new Trusts Act to replace the Trustees Act 1956. The Report contained 51 recommendations addressing a range of matters including clarifying the roles, rights and responsibilities of different parties involved in a trust and the powers of the courts. The Commission recommended that the new legislation modernise the law of trusts and address issues of accessibility needed to aid the administration of trusts.

The Commission’s report led to the introduction of the Trusts Act 2019, the first major reform of trust law in over 60 years.

=== Other projects ===
The Commission's other projects have included:

- Review of Abortion Law Reform
- The Use of DNA in Criminal Investigations
- Review of the Property (Relationships) Act 1976
- Declaratory Judgments
- Second Review of the Evidence Act 2006

== See also ==
- Public sector organisations in New Zealand
- Grant Hammond – President of the commission 2010–2016
- Geoffrey Palmer (politician) – President of the commission 2005–2010
- Amokura Kawharu – President of the commission from 2020
