= Rehearing =

Rehearing may refer to:

- In law, a rehearing is a procedure where a tribunal reconsiders a matter after previously conducting a hearing on the same matter
  - Parties generally request rehearings by filing a "petition for rehearing" or a "motion for rehearing"
  - This process should not be confused with a petition for review, which is a procedure for requesting a matter to be reconsidered by an appellate tribunal
  - Some tribunals permit rehearings en banc, where a new hearing is conducted by all members of the tribunal, or a larger group of members, rather than a select panel of members
- In parliamentary procedure, rehearing may refer to the reconsideration of a motion
- In the performing arts, the term rehearing may refer to a rehearsal
