= Peter Quilliam =

New Zealand lawyer

Sir James Peter Quilliam (23 March 1920 – 17 February 2004) was a New Zealand lawyer and jurist. He served as Chief Justice of the Cook Islands and a judge of the High Court of New Zealand.

== Early life and family ==
Born in New Plymouth on 23 March 1920, Quilliam was educated at Wanganui Collegiate School. He went on to study at Canterbury University College from 1938 to 1940, and Victoria University College from 1941 to 1943, graduating from the latter with an LLB degree in 1943. He saw military service as a lieutenant with the 2nd New Zealand Expeditionary Force in Fiji between 1942 and 1943.

In 1945, Quilliam married Ellison Jean Gill, and the couple went on to have three children.

== Legal career ==
Quilliam was admitted as a barrister and solicitor in 1944, and practised law in New Plymouth. Between 1955 and 1969, he was the New Plymouth Crown solicitor.

Between 1969 and 1988, Quilliam served as a judge of the High Court (known as the Supreme Court at the time of his appointment). In the 1988 New Year Honours, he was appointed a Knight Bachelor. Quilliam became the inaugural head of New Zealand's Police Complaints Authority (now the Independent Police Conduct Authority) in 1989, and served in that capacity until 1992.

In 1988, Quilliam became a judge of the Cook Islands High Court and Court of Appeal, and Chief Justice of the Cook Islands in 1995. He was also appointed a judge of the Court of Appeal of Fiji in 1992.
