= Legal Research Foundation =

Publisher and legal organisation affiliated with University of Auckland

The Legal Research Foundation is a body affiliated with the faculty of law of the University of Auckland, New Zealand. It was founded in 1965 to foster legal research and links between the legal profession and the university. It publishes the New Zealand Law Review.
