= Cook Islands Court of Appeal =

Superior court of record for the Cook Islands

The Court of Appeal of the Cook Islands is the superior court of record for the Cook Islands. It hears appeals from the High Court of the Cook Islands and was established by Article 56 of the Constitution of the Cook Islands.

== Composition and location ==
The judiciary is headed by the President of the Court of Appeal or, in the President's absence, the Chief Justice of the High Court or the judge with the highest seniority. The judges have seniority based on their date of first appointment to a court in the Cook Islands or elsewhere. Decisions can be made by a panel of any three judges and require a majority vote of the panel. A judge cannot hear an appeal for a decision which they made or by a court on which they sit.

A judge cannot be appointed to the Court of Appeal unless they have been a judge of the Court of Appeal of New Zealand, the High Court of New Zealand, or the High Court of the Cook Islands. A judge can also be appointed by the King's Representative if so advised by the Executive Council and the Prime Minister.

Most sittings of the Court of Appeal take place in New Zealand.

== Jurisdiction ==
The Court of Appeal can hear appeals from the High Court subject to the Constitution and the Judicature Act. These circumstances are where the High Court decides that the case involves a substantial question of law which relates to the interpretation or effect of the Constitution, where a criminal defendant has been given a fine of over $200 or sentenced to imprisonment for longer than six months, where a civil matter is more $400 or more, or there is a question involving any provision in Part IVA: Fundamental Human Rights and Freedoms of the Constitution. For any other case, the appeal can be heard with the permission of the High Court if it is of high importance.

The Court of Appeal decision is final, but there is a right of appeal to the Privy Council with the consent of either the Court of Appeal or the Privy Council itself.

== Judges ==
The following are the judges of the Court of Appeal as of December 2016:

- Sir David Williams KC (President)
- Sir Douglas White KC (appointed 1 February 2016)
- Sir Ian Barker KC
- Barry Paterson KC
- Robert Fisher KC (born 1941)
- Sir Terence Arnold (appointed 2022)
