= Patrick Savage (judge) =

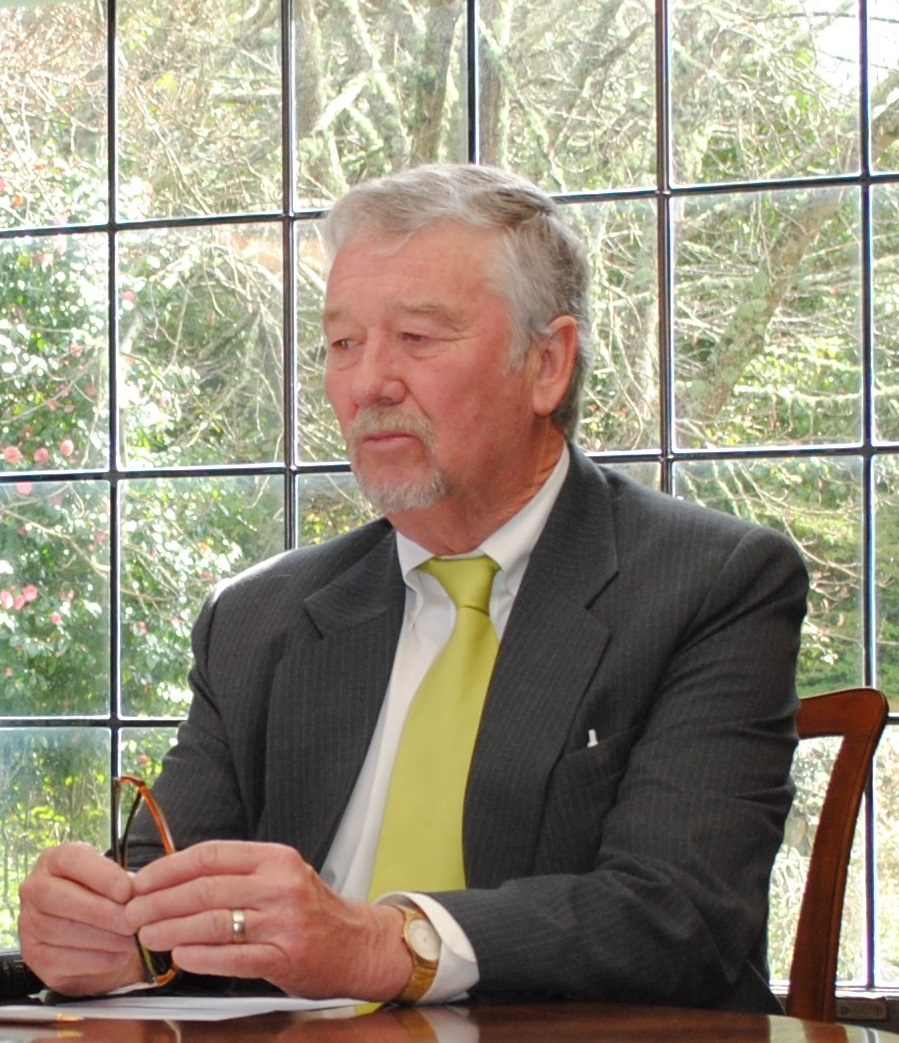
Patrick Savage, Chief Justice of Niue, in 2010

Patrick John Savage is a New Zealand judge who served as Chief Justice of Niue from 2010 to 2018.

Savage has previously served as a Crown Solicitor in the Bay of Plenty. In 1995 he was appointed as Judge of the Māori Land Court. He has also served on the Waitangi Tribunal. He was sworn in as a Judge of the High Court of Niue on 10 September 2007. and as Chief Justice on 10 September 2010, replacing Heta Hingston. He was succeeded as Chief Justice of Niue on 22 November 2018 by Craig Coxhead.

Court offices
Preceded by Heta Hingston	Chief Justice of Niue; 2010–2018	Succeeded by Craig Coxhead
