= Politics of the Cook Islands =

The politics of the Cook Islands takes place in a framework of a parliamentary representative democracy within a constitutional monarchy. The monarch of New Zealand, represented in the Cook Islands by the King or Queen's Representative, is the head of state; the prime minister is the head of government of a multi-party system. The nation is self-governing and fully responsible for its internal and foreign affairs; it has run its own foreign and defence policy since 2001. Executive power is exercised by the government, while legislative power is vested in both the government and the parliament. The judiciary is independent of the executive and the legislatures.

== Constitution ==
The Constitution of the Cook Islands took effect on 4 August 1965, when the Cook Islands became a self-governing state in free association with New Zealand. The anniversary of these events is commemorated annually on Constitution Day, with the week-long activities of Te Maeva Nui Celebrations locally.

== Executive ==
Main office-holders
Office	Name	Party	Since
King of the Cook Islands	Charles III		8 September 2022
King's Representative	Sir Tom Marsters		27 July 2013
Prime Minister	Mark Brown	CIP	1 October 2020

Ten years of rule by the Cook Islands Party (CIP) came to an end 18 November 1999 with the resignation of Prime Minister Joe Williams. Williams had led a minority government since October 1999 when the New Alliance Party (NAP) left the government coalition and joined the main opposition Democratic Party (DAP). On 18 November 1999, DAP leader Terepai Maoate was sworn in as prime minister. He was succeeded by his co-partisan Robert Woonton. When Woonton lost his seat in the 2004 elections, Jim Marurai took over.

In the 2010 elections, the CIP regained power and Henry Puna was sworn in as prime minister on 30 November 2010. His deputy, Mark Brown, succeeded him in 2020, when Puna was elected Secretary General of the Pacific Islands Forum. Brown was reelected prime minister in 2022 with an increased majority. Brown again won election in 2026.

== Legislature ==
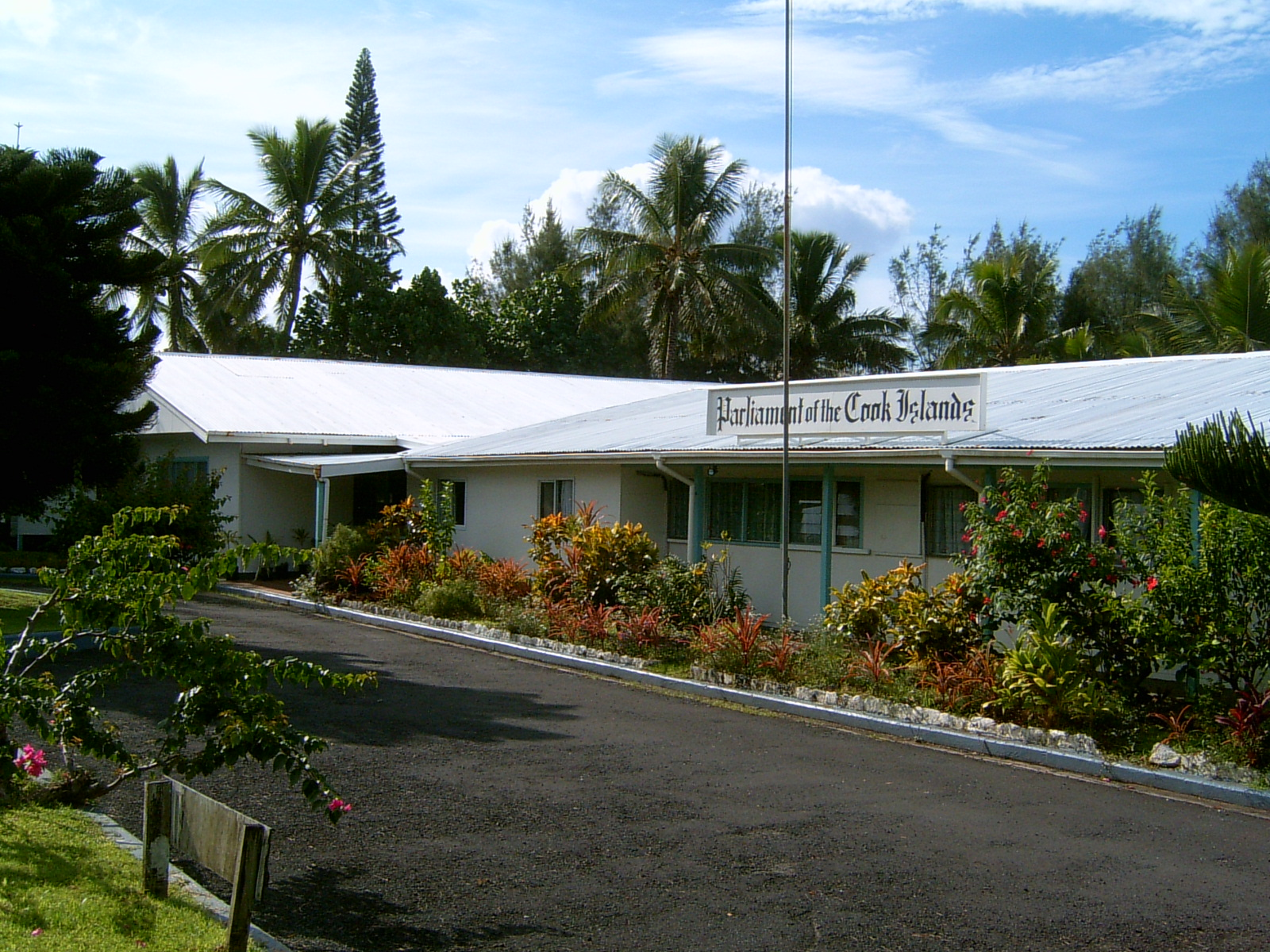
The parliament building of the Cook Islands, formerly a hotel.

The Parliament of the Cook Islands has 24 members, elected for a five-year term in single-seat constituencies. There is also a House of Ariki, composed of chiefs, which has a purely advisory role. The Koutu Nui is a similar organization consisting of sub-chiefs. It was established by an amendment in 1972 of the 1966 House of Ariki Act.

On 13 June 2008, a small majority of members of the House of Ariki attempted a coup, claiming to dissolve the elected government and to take control of the country's leadership. "Basically we are dissolving the leadership, the prime minister and the deputy prime minister and the ministers," chief Makea Vakatini Joseph Ariki explained. The Cook Islands Herald suggested that the ariki were attempting thereby to regain some of their traditional prestige or mana. Prime Minister Jim Marurai described the take-over move as "ill-founded and nonsensical". By 23 June, the situation appeared to have normalised, with members of the House of Ariki accepting to return to their regular duties.

== Judiciary ==
The judiciary is established by part IV of the Constitution, and consists of the High Court of the Cook Islands and the Cook Islands Court of Appeal. The Judicial Committee of the Privy Council serves as the final court of appeal. Judges are appointed by the King's Representative on the advice of the Executive Council as given by the Chief Justice and the Minister of Justice. Non-resident Judges are appointed for a three-year term; other Judges are appointed for life. Judges may be removed from office by the King's Representative on the recommendation of an investigative tribunal and only for inability to perform their office, or for misbehaviour.

With regard to the legal profession, Iaveta Taunga o Te Tini Short was the first Cook Islander to establish a law practice in 1968. He would later become a Cabinet Minister (1978) and High Commissioner for the Cook Islands (1985).

== Recent political history ==
The 1999 election produced a hung Parliament. Cook Islands Party leader Geoffrey Henry remained prime minister, but was replaced after a month by Joe Williams following a coalition realignment. A further realignment three months later saw Williams replaced by Democratic Party leader Terepai Maoate. A third realignment saw Maoate replaced mid-term by his deputy Robert Woonton in 2002, who ruled with the backing of the CIP.

The Democratic Party won a majority in the 2004 election, but Woonton lost his seat, and was replaced by Jim Marurai. In 2005 Marurai left the Democrats due to an internal disputes, founding his own Cook Islands First Party. He continued to govern with the support of the CIP, but in 2005 returned to the Democrats. The loss of several by-elections forced a snap-election in 2006, which produced a solid majority for the Democrats and saw Marurai continue as prime minister.

In December 2009, Marurai sacked his Deputy Prime Minister, Terepai Maoate, sparking a mass-resignation of Democratic Party cabinet members He and new Deputy Prime Minister Robert Wigmore were subsequently expelled from the Democratic Party. Marurai appointed three junior members of the Democratic party to Cabinet, but on 31 December 2009 the party withdrew its support.

== See also ==
- Foreign relations of the Cook Islands
- Political status of the Cook Islands and Niue
