= High Court of the Cook Islands =

Court of first instance in the Cook Islands

The High Court of the Cook Islands is the court of first instance in the Cook Islands. It has general jurisdiction and responsibility under the Constitution of the Cook Islands for the administration of justice in the Cook Islands. The Court is established by part IV of the Constitution of the Cook Islands.

== Composition and location ==
The Court consists of the Chief Justice of the Cook Islands, a number of other Judges, and Justices of the Peace. Judges must have practiced as a barrister in New Zealand or another Commonwealth or designated country for at least seven years, or hold or have held office as a Judge of the High Court of New Zealand, Court of Appeal of New Zealand, Supreme Court of New Zealand, or an equivalent office in a Commonwealth or designated country. Judges of the New Zealand Māori Land Court are appointed to the Land Division. Non-resident Judges are appointed for a three-year term; other Judges are appointed for life.

The Court sits mainly in Avarua, but also holds hearings in Aitutaki and Atiu.

== Jurisdiction ==
The court is divided into four divisions: criminal, civil, land, and children's court. Any Judge of the High Court may exercise any of the powers of any division. The Land Division has inherited the powers of the former Land Court of the Cook Islands, but has no jurisdiction over land on the islands of Mangaia, Mitiaro and Pukapuka unless requested by the relevant island council.

When constituted by a Judge, the High Court has original jurisdiction, and may hear appeals of decisions made by Justices of the Peace.

When constituted by a single Justice of the Peace, the criminal division has jurisdiction over specified minor offences and those punishable by fine only, and may only sentence people to imprisonment for less than two years or a fine of up to $500. A single Justice of the Peace may also hear pleas and traffic offences, as well as applications for summonses and custody of a minor. When constituted by a panel of three Justices of the Peace, the Court has jurisdiction over specified offences, and may sentence people to imprisonment for up to three years or a $1000 fine. A three-justice panel may also hear extradition cases.

In the civil jurisdiction, a single Justice of the Peace can hear matters where the amount in dispute is $1500 or less, and a panel of three Justices of the Peace can hear matters where the amount in dispute is between $1500 and $3000.

== Judges ==
The following are the Judges of the High Court as of January 2020:

- Patrick Keane (Chief Justice) (appointed 2022)
- Craig Coxhead (appointed 2016)
- Colin Doherty
- Wilson Isaac
- Dame Judith Potter
- Patrick Savage
- Peter Woodhouse
- Kit Toogood (appointed 2022)

As of August 2020 there are twenty Justices of the Peace: 14 on Rarotonga, two each on Aitutaki and Manihiki, and one each on Mangaia and Mauke.
