= Tapere =

Traditional land subdivision in the Cook Islands

A tapere or sub-district is a low-level traditional land subdivision on five of the Southern Cook Islands (Rarotonga, Mangaia, Aitutaki, Atiu, and Mauke), comparable to the ahupua'a of the main Hawaiian Islands or to the kousapw of Pohnpei. Among the populated raised islands, only Mitiaro is not subdivided into tapere. The remaining Southern Cook Islands, Manuae, Palmerston and Takutea, are atolls and/or uninhabited and therefore not subject to this type of traditional subdivision. The atolls of the Northern Cook Islands are subdivided into motu (populated atoll islets) instead.

A tapere is a subdivision of a district (the major island subdivision) or puna, which is headed by a district chief, or pava in the case of Mangaia. A tapere is normally headed by a mataiapo (a chief of a major lineage) or ariki (a high chief, the titular head of a tribe). It is occupied by the matakeinanga, the local group composed of the residential core of a major lineage, plus affines and other permitted members. Most of the tapere lands are subdivided among the minor lineages, each of which was headed by a rangatira or kōmono, or by the mataiapo himself. Below that level, there is the uanga, the extended family, the residential core of which occupied a household.

Historically, tapere were almost always wedge-shaped—the boundaries beginning at defined points on the outer reef and running inland to enclose an ever-narrowing strip of land until converging at a point in or near the centre of the island. By this type of delineation, any one map included every category of soil type and land surface of the island, from the typically mountainous interior, where forest products were collected, through fertile valleys where the major food crops were grown, across the rocky coastal strip of elevated fossil coral (makatea), out to the lagoon and fringing reef.

== Overview of islands subdivided into tapere ==
Island	Number of districts	Number of tapere
Aitutaki	8	19
Atiu	6	6
Mangaia	6	38
Mauke	4	11
Rarotonga	5	54
Total	29	128

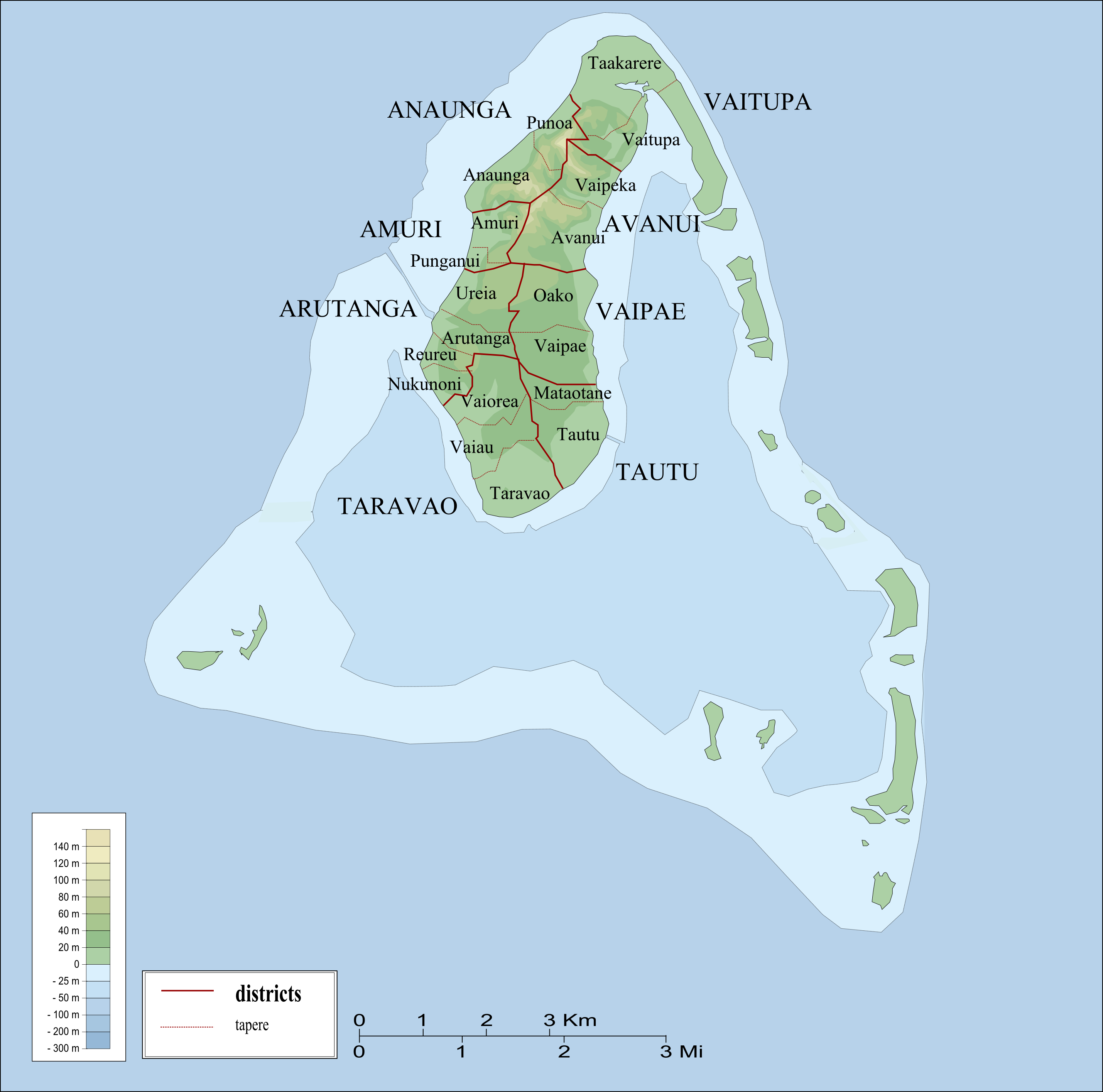
Aitutaki

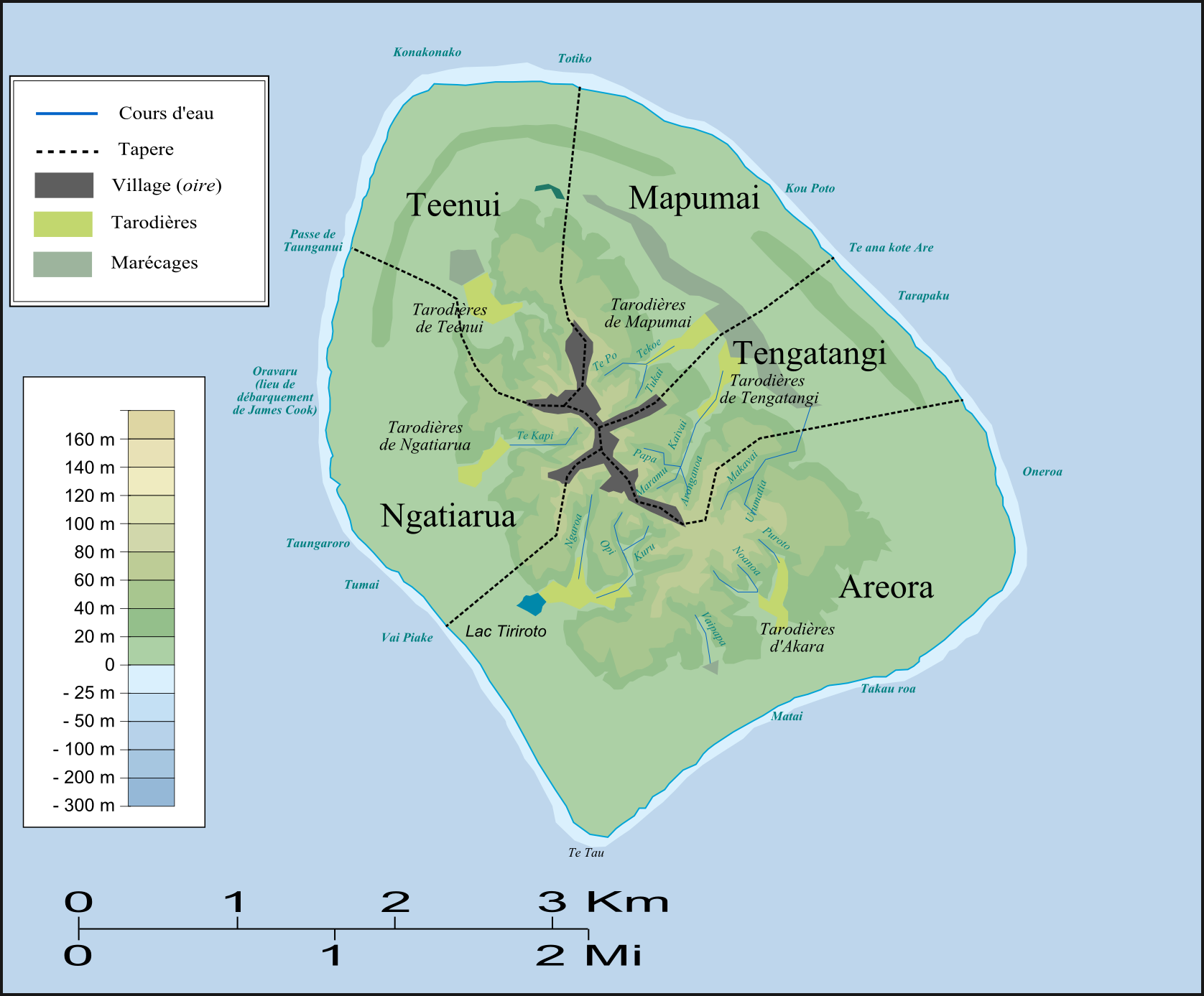
Atiu

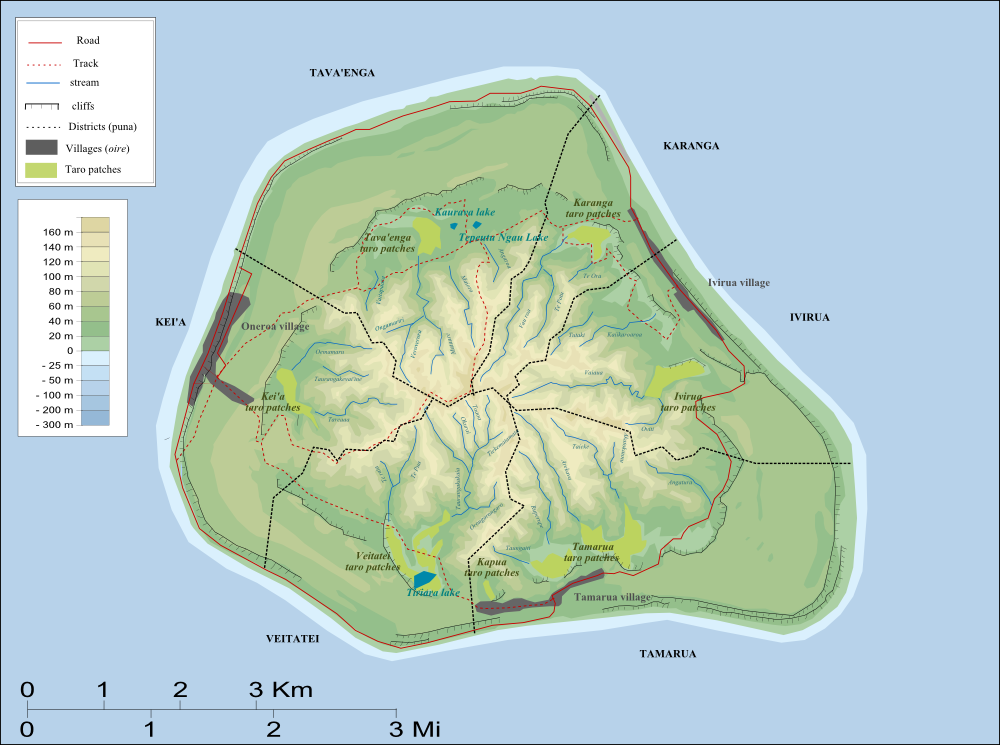
Mangaia (only districts)

Mauke

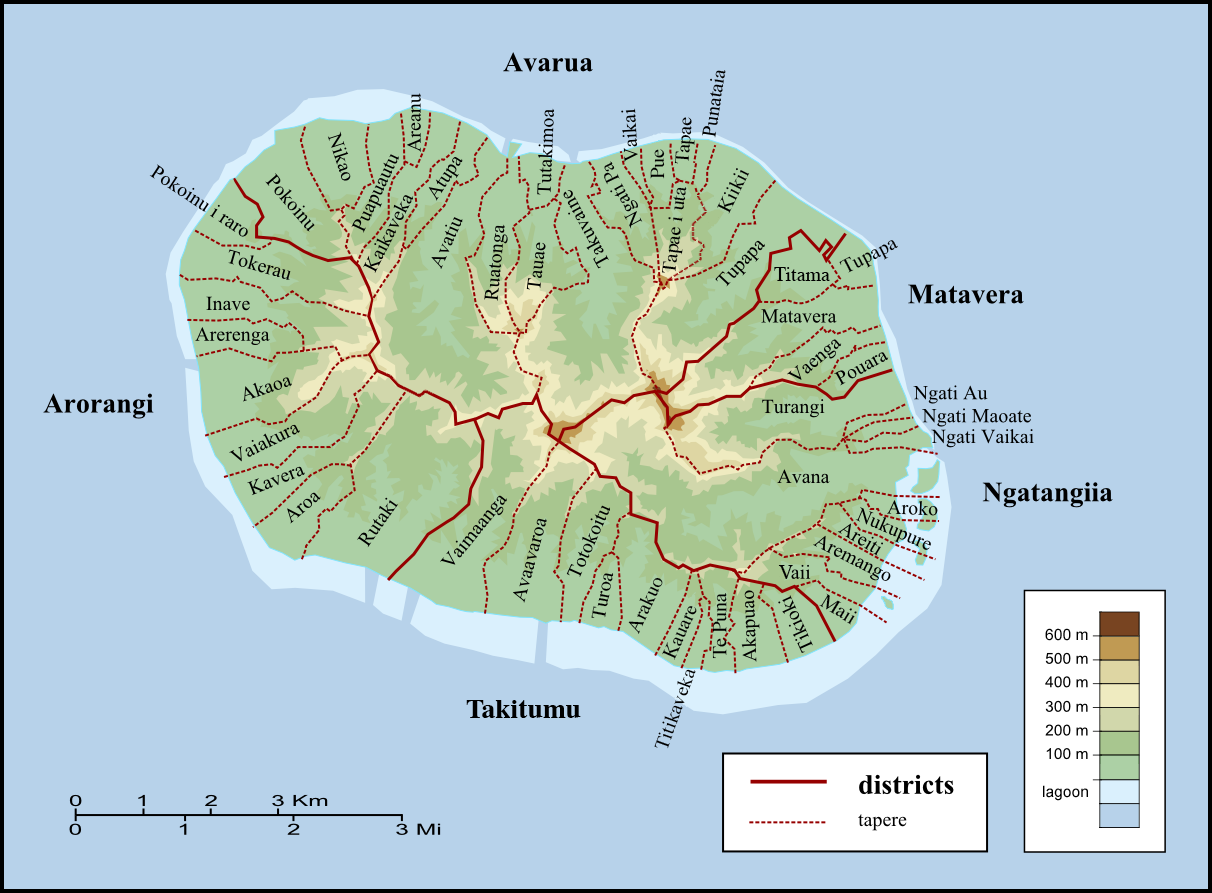
Rarotonga

== List of tapere ==
=== Aitutaki ===
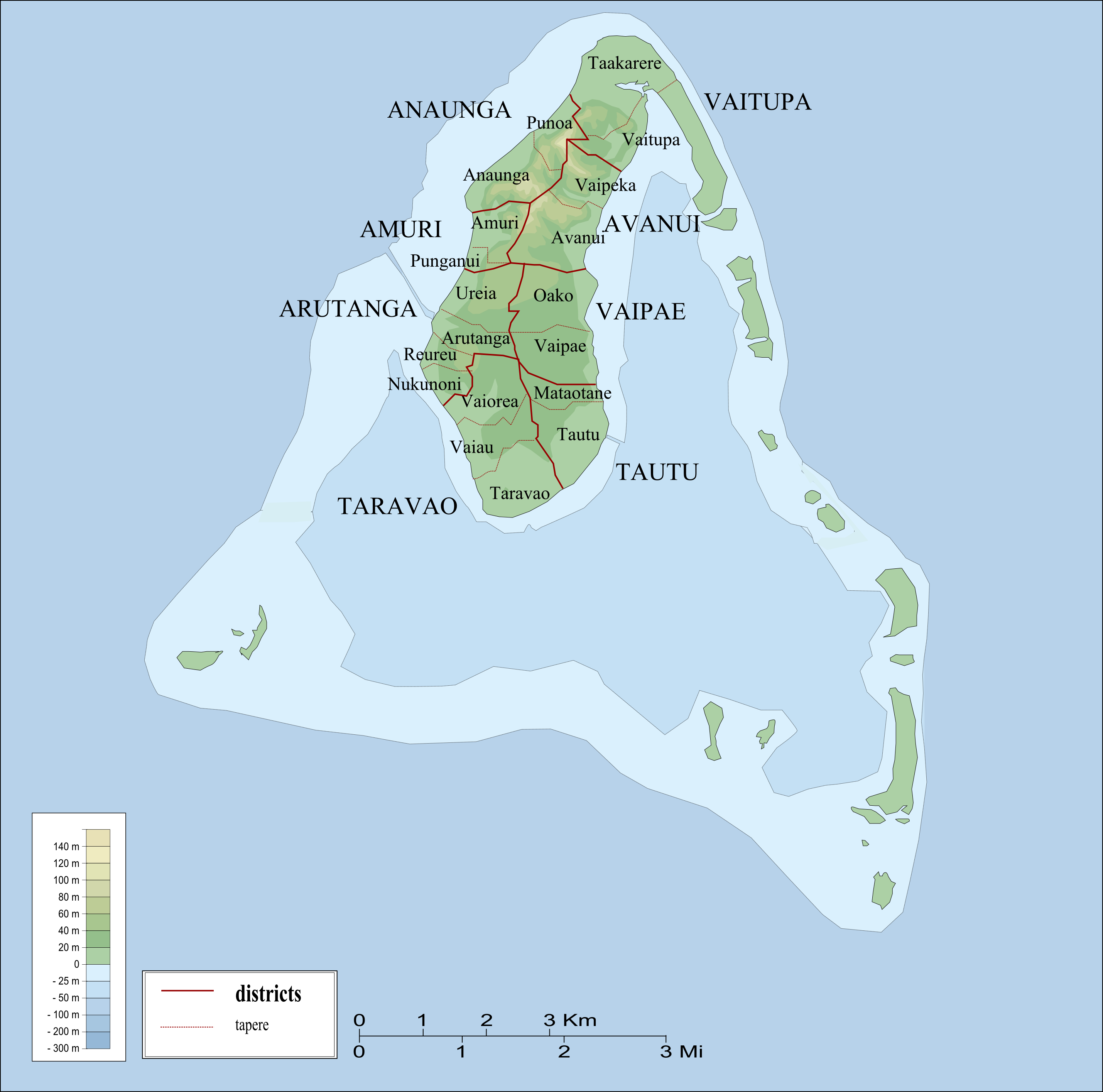
Districts and tapere of Aitutaki

Aitutaki is subdivided into eight districts with 19 tapere according to the constitution. The 16 minor islands, 12 of them motu, are outside of this subdivision scheme:

- Amuri District
  - Amuri Tapere
  - Punganui Tapere
- Anaunga District
  - Anaunga Tapere
  - Punoa Tapere
- Arutanga District
  - Arutanga Tapere
  - Reureu Tapere
  - Nukunoni Tapere
  - Ureia Tapere
- Avanui District
  - Avanui Tapere
  - Vaipeka Tapere
- Taravao District
  - Taravao Tapere
  - Vaiau Tapere
  - Vaiorea Tapere
- Tautu District
  - Mataotane Tapere
  - Tautu Tapere
- Vaipae District
  - Oako Tapere
  - Vaipae Tapere
- Vaitupa District
  - Taakarere Tapere
  - Vaitupa Tapere

=== Atiu ===
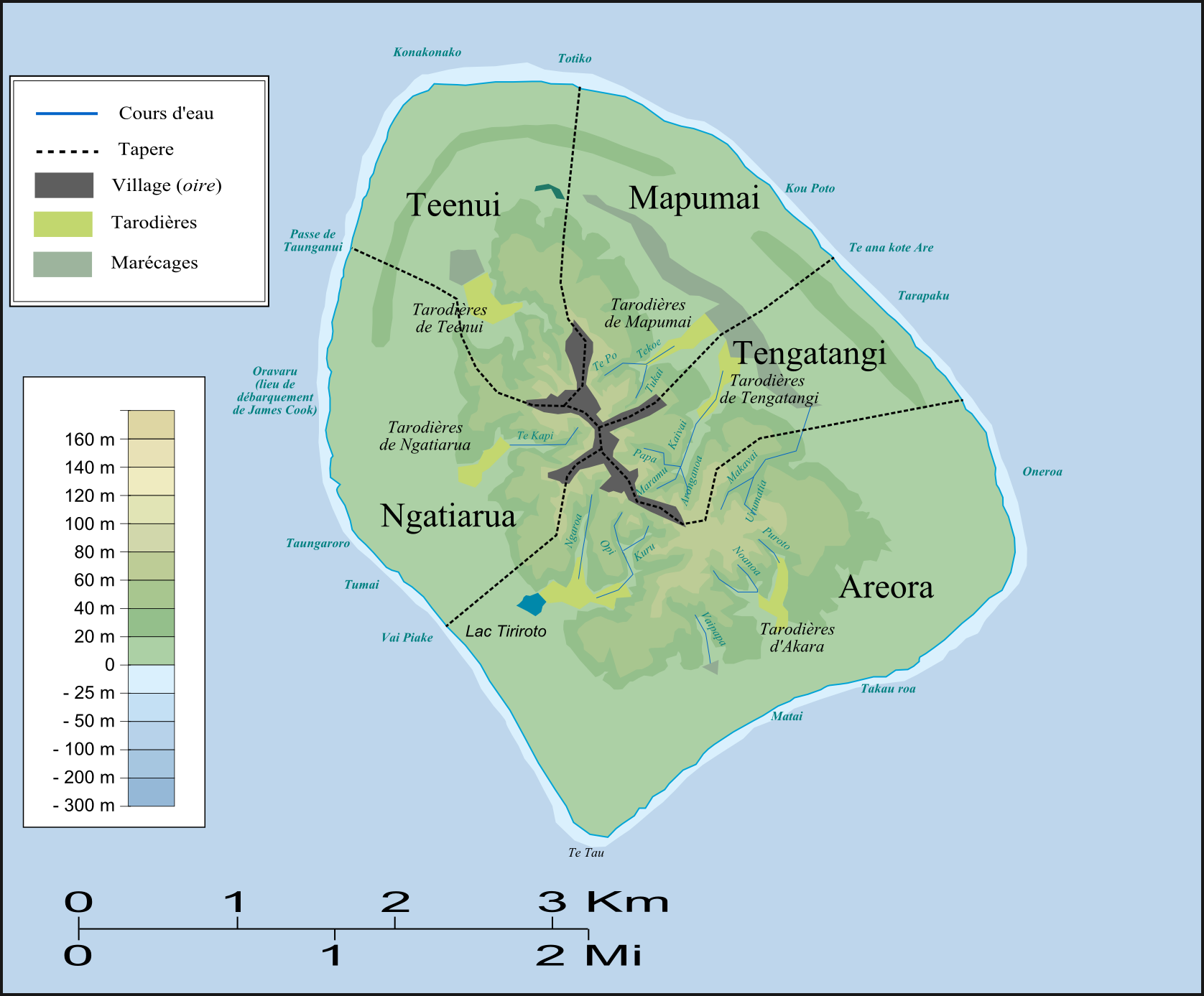
Villages / tapere of Atiu

In the case of Atiu, the six villages correspond to the six tapere:

- Areora Village (Tapere)
- Mapumai Village (Tapere)
- Ngatiarua Village (Tapere)
- Teenui Village (Tapere)
- Tengatangi Village (Tapere)

=== Mangaia ===
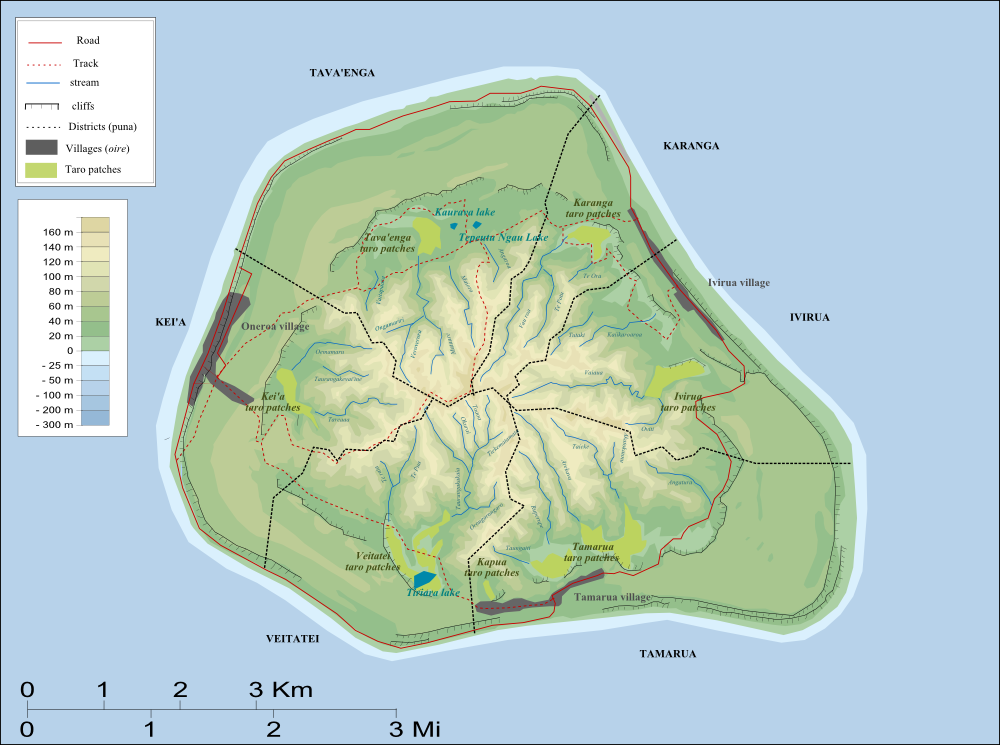
Districts / tapere of Mangaia

Mangaia is subdivided into six Districts (puna), which are further subdivided into 38 tapere. In the Cook Islands Constitution however, the six districts are called tapere.

- Tava'enga District
  - Tapere of Ta'iti
  - Tapere of Te-rupe
  - Tapere of Maro
  - Tapere of Au-ruia
  - Tapere of Te-mati-o-Pa'eru
  - Tapere of Te-pueu
- Karanga District
  - Tapere of Teia-roa
  - Tapere of Teia-poto
  - Tapere of Teia-pini
  - Tapere of Kaau-i-miri
  - Tapere of Kaau-i-uta
- Ivirua District
  - Tapere of Avarari
  - Tapere of Te-i'i-maru
  - Tapere of Te-uturei
  - Tapere of Te-ara-nui-o-Toi
  - Tapere of Te-korokoro
  - Tapere of Te-pauru-o-Rongo
- Tamarua Tapere Map of Tamarua District
  - Tapere of Te-vai-taeta-i-uta
  - Tapere of Pukuotoi
  - Tapere of Vaitangi (Pukuotoi)
  - Tapere of Te-vai-taeta-i-tai
  - Tapere of Angauru
  - Tapere of Te-vai-kao
  - Tapere of Akaea
  - Tapere of Maru-kore
  - Tapere of Poutoa-i-miri
  - Tapere of Poutoa-i-uta
- Veitatei District
  - Tapere of Te-noki
  - Tapere of Te-tuaroa (Te-tukono)
  - Tapere of Te-tuapoto
  - Tapere of Te-tarapiki
  - Tapere of Kaikatu
  - Tapere of Angarinoi
- Kei'a District
  - Tapere of Akaoro
  - Tapere of Tapuata
  - Tapere of Tongamarama
  - Tapere of Te-inati
  - Tapere of Rupetau-i-miri
  - Tapere of Rupetau-i-uta

=== Mauke ===
Mauke is subdivided into four traditional districts. Vaimutu and Makatea are not further subdivided and correspond to one tapere each. Ngatiarua and Areora districts are subdivided into 6 and 3 tapere, respectively, totalling 11 tapere for the whole island:

- Ngatiarua District (north)
  - Tapere of Te Tukunga
  - Tapere of Mokoero
  - Tapere of Puneua
  - Tapere of Ikurua
  - Tapere of Arakiropu
  - Tapere of Araki
- Vaimutu District (east, corresponds to 1 tapere)
  - Tapere of Vaimutu
- Areora District (south)
  - Tapere of Tukume
  - Tapere of Arao
  - Tapere of Anua
- Makatea District (west, corresponds to 1 tapere)
  - Tapere of Makatea

=== Rarotonga ===
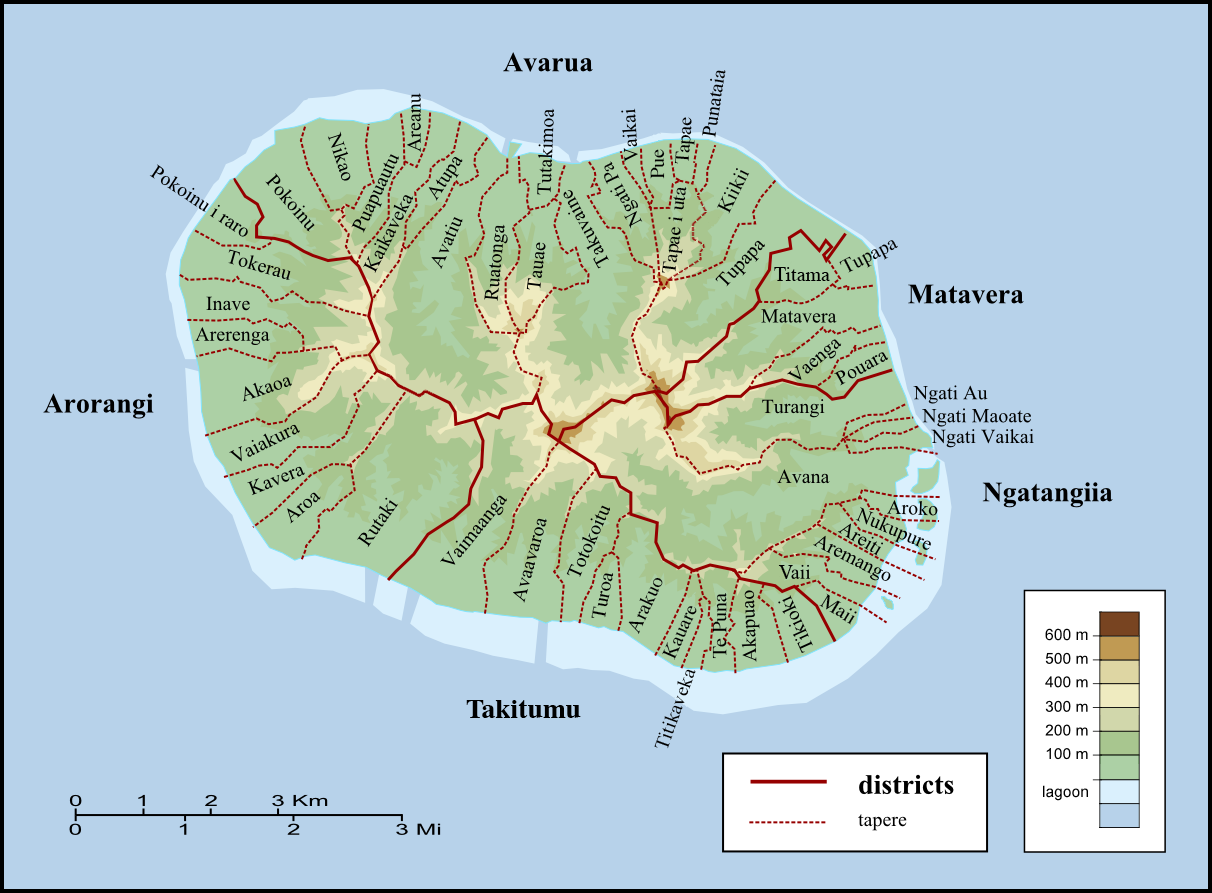
Districts and tapere of Rarotonga

Rarotonga is subdivided into five survey land districts (not to be confused with the three traditional vaka districts that served as local government units with councils and mayors from 1997 to February 2008), with a total of 54 tapere, more than any other island of the Cooks Islands:

- Arorangi District (9)
  - Tapere of Akaoa
  - Tapere of Arerenga
  - Tapere of Aroa
  - Tapere of Inave
  - Tapere of Kavera
  - Tapere of Pokoinu-I-Raro
  - Tapere of Rutaki
  - Tapere of Tokerau
  - Tapere of Vaiakura
- Avarua District (capital of the Cook Islands) (19) from west to east
1. Tapere of Pokoinu
2. Tapere of Nikao (seat of Cook Islands parliament)
3. Tapere of Puapuautu
4. Tapere of Areanu
5. Tapere of Kaikaveka
6. Tapere of Atupa
7. Tapere of Avatiu (commercial port)
8. Tapere of Ruatonga
9. Tapere of Tutakimoa
10. Tapere of Tauae (inward from Tutakimoa, the only tapere without coast)
11. Tapere of Takuvaine (downtown Avarua, seat of Cook Islands government, with Avarua fishing harbour)
12. Tapere of Ngatipa
13. Tapere of Vaikai
14. Tapere of Tapae-I-Uta
15. Tapere of Pue
16. (Tapere of Tapae)
17. Tapere of Punamaia
18. Tapere of Kiikii
19. Tapere of Tupapa
- Matavera District (5)
  - Tapere of Titama
  - Tapere of Tupapa (not to be confused with a tapere of the same name in Avarua District)
  - Tapere of Matavera
  - Tapere of Pouara
  - Tapere of Vaenga
- Ngatangiia District (11)
  - Tapere of Turangi
  - Tapere of Ngati Au
  - Tapere of Ngati Maoate
  - Tapere of Ngati Vaikai
  - Tapere of Avana (with the island of Motutapu)
  - Tapere of Aroko (with the island of Oneroa (northern part)
  - Tapere of Nukupure (Muri) (with the islands of Oneroa (southern part) and Koromiri (northern part)
  - Tapere of Areiti (with the island of Koromiri (southern part)
  - Tapere of Aremango
  - Tapere of Vaii (with the island of Taakoka)
  - Tapere of Maii
- Takitumu District (Titikaveka) (10)
  - Tapere of Tikioki
  - Tapere of Akapuao
  - Tapere of Te Puna
  - Tapere of Titikaveka
  - Tapere of Kauare
  - Tapere of Arakuo
  - Tapere of Turoa
  - Tapere of Totokoitu
  - Tapere of Avaavaroa
  - Tapere of Vaimaanga
