= Tou Travel Ariki =

Cook Islands high chief

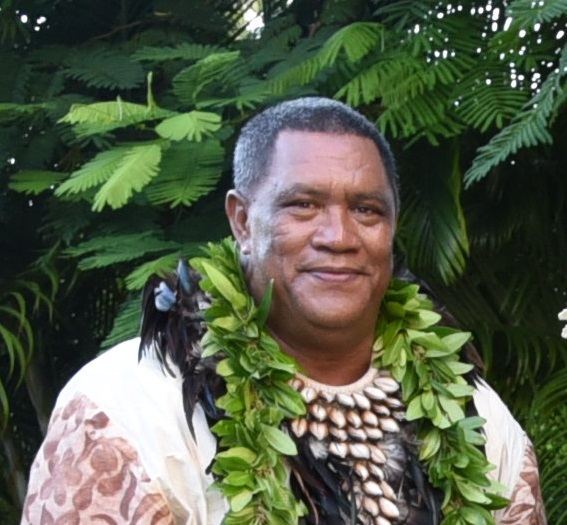
- Tou Ariki in 2017

President of the House of Ariki
- Incumbent
- Assumed office 2008
- Preceded by: Ada Rongomatane Ariki
- In office 2002–2006
- Preceded by: Upokotini Marie Ariki
- Succeeded by: Ada Rongomatane Ariki

Tou Travel Ariki is a Cook Islands high chief (ariki) from Mitiaro who has been the president of the House of Ariki since 2008, and from 2002 to 2006. The House of Ariki is a mostly ceremonial body and Tou has been a member of delegations to Australia and other Māori leaders.

== Early life ==
Tou Travel Ariki is a high chief from the island of Mitiaro.

== Career ==
Travel was first elected President of the House of Ariki in 2001, and was elected to his final term in 2023. The Parliament of the Cook Islands is consulted by the House of Ariki about the welfare of the people, but the body mostly serves a ceremonial role. The president of the House of Ariki was given a salary of $8,320 in 2011. He noted the expenses of the position as he is invited to multiple functions where he is expected to give donations.

Travel led a twenty-four member delegation from the House of Ariki to Cairns, Australia, in 2015. Mark Brown and Travel signed the sister city agreement between Avarua and Honolulu. He was a member of the Cook Islands' delegation to Tūrangawaewae after the death of Tūheitia in 2024.

== Political positions ==
Travel supported the He Whakaputanga Moana treaty and giving legal personhood to whales. He is opposed to any changes to the Treaty of Waitangi. Efforts to change the name of the Cook Islands to a native Māori name, such as 'Avaiki, were opposed by Travel in 2020, as he believes it is not the time for such a move.

Travel called for the government to increase its teaching of Cook Islands Māori in schools. Travel stated that the continued existence of the traditional Māori leaders has aided tourism to the islands.

== Works cited ==
=== Books ===
- Nohlen, Dieter, ed. (2003). Elections in Asia and the Pacific: A Data Handbook: Volume II: South East Asia, East Asia, and the South Pacific. Oxford University Press. ISBN 9780191600012.

=== News ===
- "House of Ariki and Koutu Nui host Maori King". Cook Island Herald. Archived from the original on 2 July 2025.
- "Pacific, Māori leaders seek legal personhood for whales". Stuff. 1 April 2024. Archived from the original on 2 July 2025.
- "Renewed calls for the Cook Islands to take on indigenous name". Radio New Zealand. 3 July 2020. Archived from the original on 2 July 2025.
- "Review of House of Ariki budget long overdue". Cook Island Herald. 23 March 2011. Archived from the original on 2 July 2025.
- "Tou Ariki re elected President of House of Ariki". Cook Island Herald. 2 December 2009. Archived from the original on 3 March 2016.
- Clarke, Harry (21 September 2015). "Cook Islands royal family visits Cairns on international planning tour". The Cairns Post.
- Etches, Melina (26 August 2021). "Koutu Nui must return to their tribes, says Are Ariki". Cook Islands News. Archived from the original on 2 July 2025.
- Etches, Melina (29 September 2023). "Tou Travel Ariki re-elected president of Te Are Ariki". Cook Islands News. Archived from the original on 2 July 2025.
- Formanek, Jared (14 June 2024). "Pacific Indigenous leaders have a new plan to protect whales. Treat them as people". CNN. Archived from the original on 2 July 2025.
- Haxton, Tiana (20 November 2024). "Cook Islands PM 'not surprised' at Treaty Principles Bill opposition". Radio New Zealand. Archived from the original on 2 July 2025.
- Mika, Talaia (6 May 2025). "'Our language must live on': Tou Ariki urges emphasis on Cook Islands Māori in schools". Cook Islands News. Archived from the original on 2 July 2025.

=== Web ===
- "About Parliament". Parliament of the Cook Islands. Archived from the original on 2 July 2025.
- "Pasifika acknowledge the passing of the late Kiingi Tūheitia". Pasifika TV. 4 September 2024. Archived from the original on 2 July 2025.
- Blair, Chad (7 June 2024). "Honolulu Now A Sister City With Avarua In The Cook Islands". Honolulu Civil Beat. Archived from the original on 2 July 2025.
