= List of presidents of the House of Ariki =

President of the House of Ariki
- Te Kaumaiti Nui o te Are Ariki
- Coat of arms of the Cook Islands

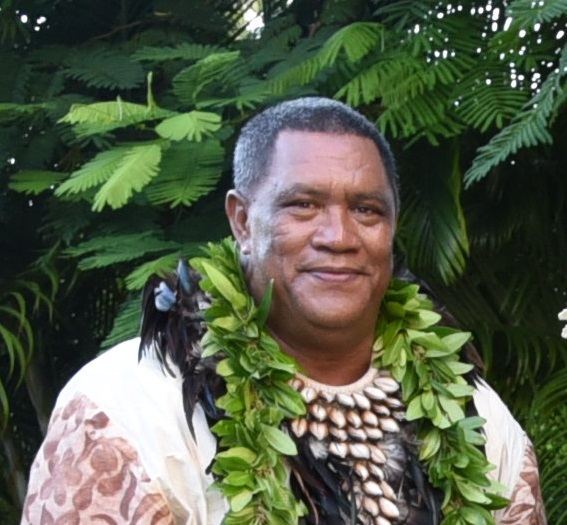
- Incumbent; Tou Travel Ariki since December 2008
- Type: Presiding Officer
- Member of: House of Ariki
- Nominator: House of Ariki
- Appointer: King's Representative
- Term length: 4 years, renewable
- Constituting instrument: Constitution of the Cook Islands; House of Ariki Act 1966
- Formation: 23 September 1966
- First holder: Te Pou Makea Vakatini Ariki
- Deputy: Vice President

The President of the House of Ariki (Cook Islands Māori: Te Kaumaiti Nui o te Are Ariki) is the presiding officer of the House of Ariki in the Cook Islands.

The incumbent president is Tou Travel Ariki (Mitiaro), having been most recently re-elected in 2023.

As of 2026, the vice-president (Kaumaiti Iti) is Tinomana Tokerau Munro Ariki.

== List ==
=== Presidents ===
The following is a list of presidents of the House of Ariki.

Name	Entered office	Left office
Te Pou Makea Vakatini Ariki	1966	?
Makea Nui Teremoana Ariki	1970	?
Makea Karika Takau Margaret Ariki	1978	1980
Pa Tepaeru Terito Ariki, Lady Davis	1980	1990
Makea Karika Takau Margaret Ariki	1990	1992
Pa Tepaeru Teariki Upokotini Marie Ariki	1992	2002
Tou Travel Ariki	2002	2006
Ada Rongomatane Ariki	2006	January 2008
Tou Travel Ariki	December 2008	Incumbent (Note: Most recently re-elected in September 2023.)

=== Vice presidents ===
Name	Entered office	Left office
Tinomana Tokerau Munro Ariki	?	Incumbent
