= Kōmono =

The kōmono is a title in the Cook Islands for a spokesman, representative or deputy for a mata'iapo (a chiefly title and the head of a family) under the ariki (paramount chief). A kōmono is often a younger brother who acts for the mata'iapo when necessary.

== See also ==
- House of Ariki
