= Ada Rongomatane Ariki =

Cook Islands Ariki–president (1948–2018)

President of the House of Ariki
- In office 2006–2008
- Preceded by: Tou Travel Ariki
- Succeeded by: Tou Travel Ariki

Personal details
- Born: 20 August 1948
- Died: 9 January 2018 (aged 69)

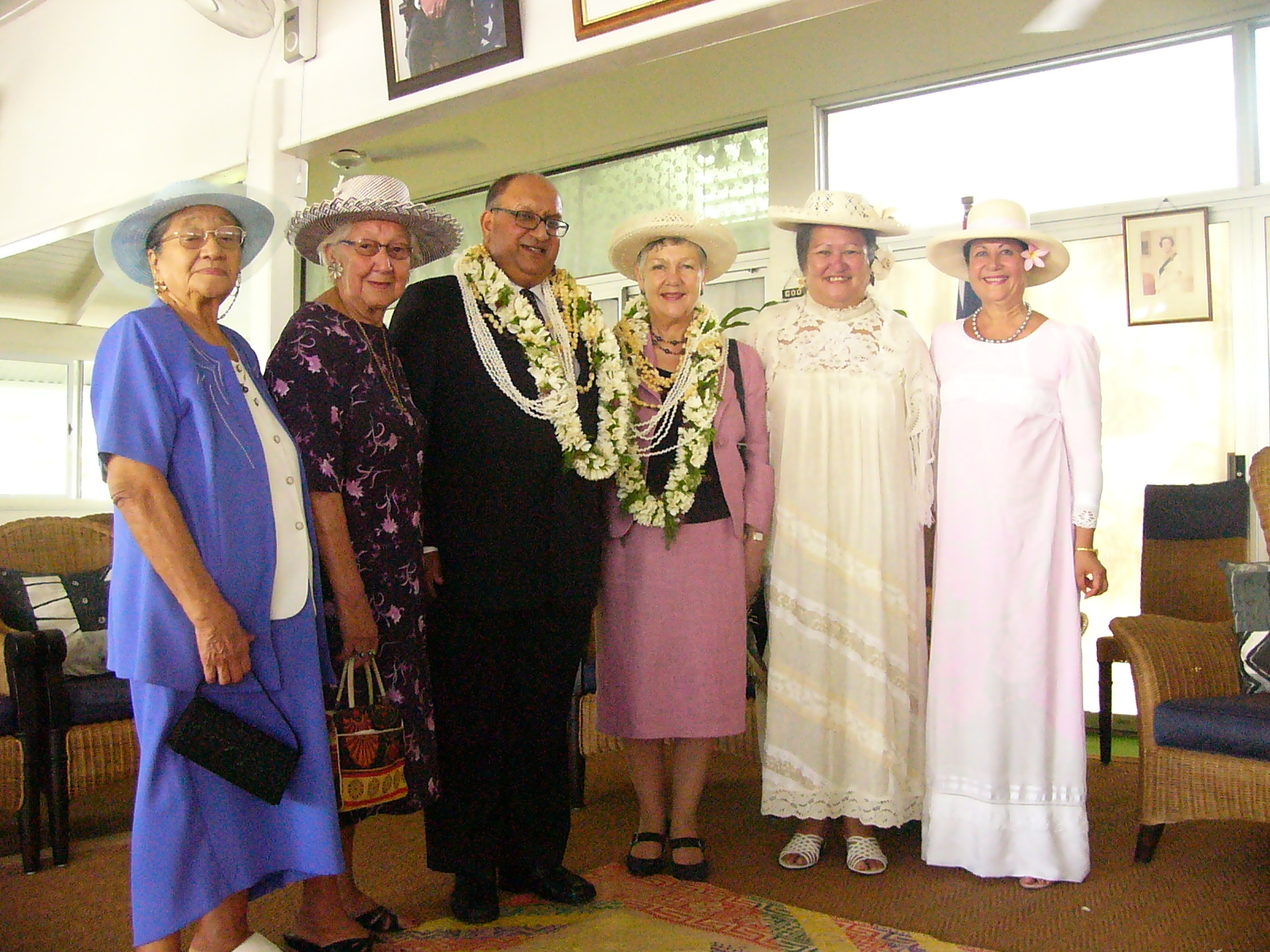
NZ Governor-General Anand Satyanand with members of the Cook Islands House of Ariki, 2007. Ada Rongomatane Ariki is second from right.

Ada Rongomatane Ariki (20 August 1948 – 9 January 2018), also known as Ada Teaupurepure Tetupu Nicholls, was a Cook Islands ariki. She held the title of Rongomatane Ariki, the principal title of the Paruarangi tribe on the island of Atiu. She served as President of the House of Ariki from 2006 to December 2008.

She was the daughter of Rongomatane Tetupu Ariki, and spent her childhood between Atiu and Rarotonga. After schooling, she worked in the post office and the Philatelic Bureau.

She acceded to the Rongomatene title in February 1972 and served in the House of Ariki, serving as its president between 2006 and 2008. In 2008 while serving as President she was one of eight members of the House of Ariki to sign a proclamation purporting to dissolve the government. She later retracted her support.

In 1977, she was awarded the Queen Elizabeth II Silver Jubilee Medal.

In 2007 she accompanied 27 Kuhl's lorikeets from Rimatara to Atiu, leading to their successful reintroduction to the Cook Islands. She also served as patron of the Cook Islands National Council of Women.

She was succeeded as Rongomatane Ariki by her son, Nicholas Nicholls.
