= Rangatira (Cook Islands) =

A rangatira was the title given to a minor chief in the Cook Islands - often someone who was closely related to an ariki or mataiapo, now usually by the younger brothers or sisters; the head of a branch of a rangatira or mataiapo family.

A rangatira title was usually inherited within a family. It was associated with a tapere - the land on which the people of a village belonged. The rangatira could expect contributions of goods and services from the people of his village. The majority of his village population of which he was the head, would have come from his descent group.

A rangatira could only be created by the ariki who delegated authority to the rangatira in order to create a structure of support from within the tapere for the ariki. This tapere support mechanism was stronger than that of the mataiapo because its population was larger.

== See also ==
- House of Ariki
