= Centre for Pacific Crops and Trees =

The Pacific Community's Centre for Pacific Crops and Trees (CePaCT), formerly known as the Regional Germplasm Centre (RGC), is a propagation material vault operated by the Pacific Community (SPC)'s Land Resources Division. Its purpose is to preserve resources including crops, and other plants of the Pacific region. The vault is in Fiji, and it replaced many local seed vaults of the Pacific that had trouble with maintenance.

This center is vested in using cutting edge plant cryopreservation, and propagation methods.

== See also ==
- Germplasm
- International Treaty on Plant Genetic Resources for Food and Agriculture
- Svalbard Global Seed Vault
- Seed saving
