= Pacific Community =

International development organisation

- Flag Logo

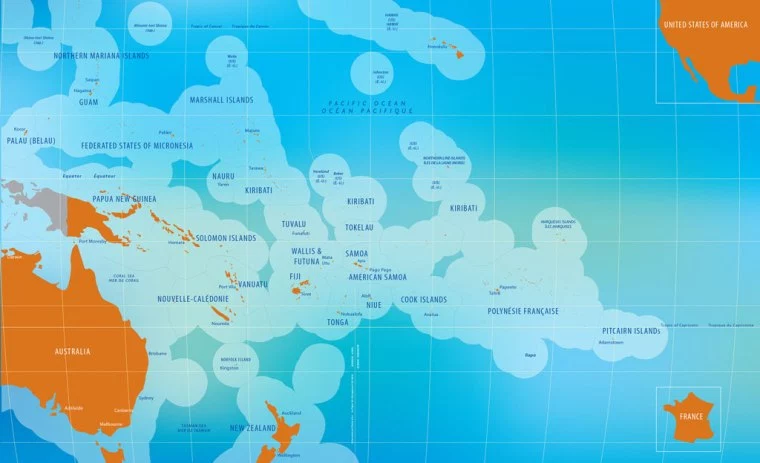
- SPC 2016 member map
- Headquarters location: Nouméa, New Caledonia; 22.3018°S 166.4428°E
- Membership: 27 countries and territories: American Samoa; Australia; Cook Islands; Fiji; France; French Polynesia; Guam; Kiribati; Marshall Islands; Micronesia; Nauru; New Caledonia; New Zealand; Niue; Northern Mariana Islands; Palau; Papua New Guinea; Pitcairn Islands; Samoa; Solomon Islands; Tokelau; Tonga; Tuvalu; United Kingdom; United States; Vanuatu; Wallis and Futuna

Leaders
  - Committee of Representatives: Annual Chair Rotation
  - Director-General: (Tonga) Paula Vivili

Establishment
  - as South Pacific Commission: 1947
  - as the Pacific Community: 2016
- Time zone: 12 time zones: UTC; +8 (Australia); +9 (Palau); +9:30 (Australia); +10 (Australia) (Federated States of Micronesia) (Papua New Guinea); +11 (Federated States of Micronesia) (New Caledonia) (Solomon Islands); +11 (Vanuatu); +12 (Fiji) (Kiribati) (Marshall Islands); +12 (Nauru) (New Zealand) (Tuvalu); +13 (Kiribati) (Tonga); +14 (Kiribati); -10 (French Polynesia); -9:30 (French Polynesia); -9 (French Polynesia); -8 (Pitcairn Islands)
- Website spc.int/

The Pacific Community (PC), formerly the South Pacific Commission or the Secretariat of the Pacific Community (SPC), is an international development organisation governed by 27 members, including 22 Pacific island countries and territories around the Pacific Ocean. The organisation's headquarters are in Nouméa, New Caledonia, and it has regional offices in Suva, Pohnpei, and Port Vila, as well as field staff in other locations in the Pacific. Its working languages are English and French. It primarily provides technical and scientific advice, and acts as a conduit for funding of development projects from donor nations. Unlike the slightly smaller Pacific Islands Forum, PaciCom is not a trade bloc, and does not deal with military or security issues.

PaciCom's regional development issues include climate change, disaster risk management, fisheries, food security, education, gender equality, human rights, non-communicable diseases, agriculture, forestry and land use, water resources, and youth employment.

== History ==
The Pacific Community was founded on 6 February 1947 as the South Pacific Commission by six developed countries with strategic interests and territories in the region: Australia, France, the Netherlands, New Zealand, the United Kingdom, and the United States.

The SPC's founding charter is the Canberra Agreement. In the aftermath of World War II, the six colonial powers which created the SPC arguably intended it to secure Western political and military interests in the postwar Pacific. Two founding members, the Netherlands and the United Kingdom, have since withdrawn from the SPC as the Pacific territories they controlled either gained independence or the right to represent themselves in the organization.

From the start, the SPC's role was constrained. The invitation from Australia and New Zealand to the US, France, the Netherlands and the UK to participate in a South Seas Commission Conference in 1947 included the statement that "the [South Pacific] Commission to be set up should not be empowered to deal in any way with political matters or questions of defense or security". This constraint on discussion (particularly the constraint on discussing nuclear weapons testing in the region) led to the 1971 creation of the South Pacific Forum (now Pacific Islands Forum), which not only excluded the more distant "metropolitan" powers of France, UK and US, but also at the time their Pacific island territories.

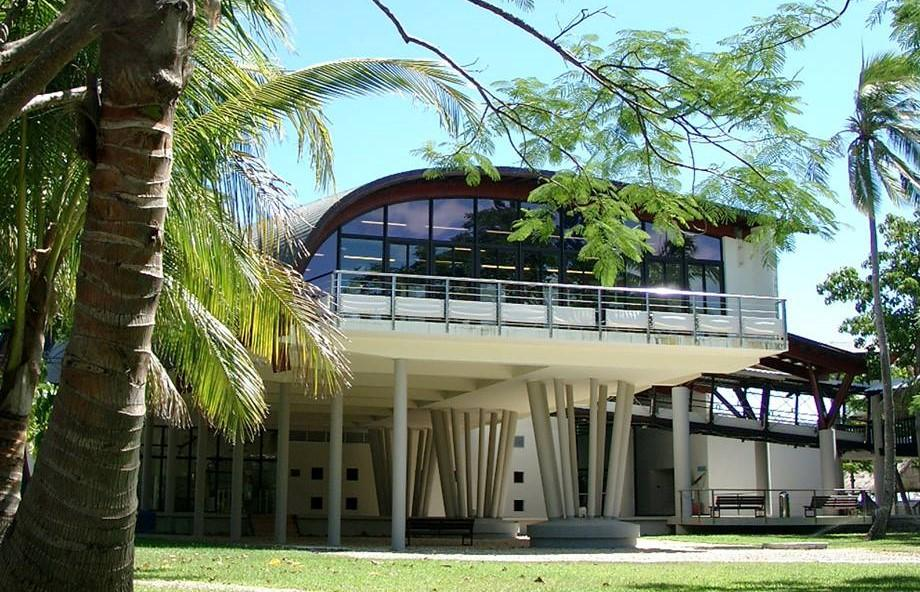
Headquarters of the Pacific Community in 2018

In 1949, the Pacific Community established its permanent headquarters in Nouméa, New Caledonia, at a former American military base. In 1995, a new headquarters was constructed close to the same location and the military base was demolished. A monument and plaque commemorating SPC's original headquarters location can be found on site of the Le Promenade complex at Anse Vata.

In 1962, the Pacific Community created the South Pacific Games Council with the goal of holding a regular Pacific wide sporting event. The first games Games were held in Suva, Fiji in 1963, with 646 participants from 13 Pacific territories taking part. Initially the Games were held at three-year intervals although this was subsequently expanded to four following the Tumon Games in Guam.

Dutch New Guinea, formerly represented in the SPC by the Netherlands, was transferred to United Nations authority in 1962 and to Indonesia the following year. Without any territory remaining in the region, the Netherlands withdrew from the SPC in 1962.

Governance of the SPC reflected the changing political environment. At inception, each member had equal representation and a single vote. When Western Samoa joined as newly independent state in 1965 the rules were changed to ensure that the Western foundation nations would maintain firm control over the organization. Australia was given five votes, France, Britain, New Zealand, and the United States four and Western Samoa just one.

In 1972, the first South Pacific Arts Festival was convened by SPC in Suva, Fiji. The event drew more than 1000 participants from 14 countries. In 1975 SPC created a Council of Pacific Arts, permanently making culture issues a part of the SPC mandate and establishing the Festival of Pacific Arts as a regular event.

In response to demand to rapid development of the Pacific regions media industry, SPC established a Regional Media Center in 1973 in collaboration with the recently created University of the South Pacific. The center produced audio material for the regions radio stations and provided training in video production.

With decolonization efforts expanding, newly independent states and nonindependent territories were also allowed to apply for membership. "As its membership grew, the character and scope of the SPC evolved to incorporate the indigenous peoples of the Pacific."

In 1983, at the Saipan Conference, unequal voting was abandoned, once again establishing a "one member, one vote" principle for SPC. However, this decision did not come without criticism as some pointed out that the combination of allowing membership to non-independent territories and establishing a one-vote per member principle effectively provided additional votes to France and the United States who continued to maintain control over Pacific territories. It was also during the Saipan Conference that the Committee of Representatives of Governments and Administrations (CRGA) was established, creating the only Pacific regional organization that was both fully representative of the Pacific, and fully governed by its membership.

In 1988, the SPC become a founding member of the Council of Regional Organisations in the Pacific or CROP (formerly the South Pacific Organisations Coordinating Committee, SPOCC) "to improve cooperation, coordination, and collaboration among the various intergovernmental regional organisations to work toward achieving the common goal of sustainable development in the Pacific region".

The United Kingdom withdrew from the organisation in 1996 and rejoined in 1998. The UK withdrew a second time in 2004. The UK's interests in the Pacific Community were prior to Brexit primarily managed through the European Union, although the UK also is a direct donor for some projects. The UK rejoined in 2021 after reopening its high commissions in Tonga, Samoa and Vanuatu.

In 1996, the Pacific Heads of Agriculture and Livestock Programmes asked "to put in place, both in their countries and through regional cooperation, policies to conserve, protect and best utilize their plant genetic resources". As these resources were considered a shared regional responsibility, it made sense for a regional organization to respond to this need. SPC established the Regional Germplasm Centre (RGC) in 1998. The facility grew rapidly and in 2007 was renamed Centre for Pacific Crops and Trees (CePaCT). It currently holds more than 2000 varieties of genetic material on Pacific strains of taro, banana, breadfruit and others, and has been instrumental in helping to rebuild island agriculture after disasters.

In 2000, SPC became the first CROP organization to be headed by a woman, Lourdes Pangelinan of Guam, who served in the role from 2000 to 2006.

=== Pacific Way television series ===
The SPC began producing a television program, known as The Pacific Way, in 1995. Supported by UNESCO as a trial for exchanging news stories, the first season was shared freely with just one tape circulated between TV stations in several Pacific Island nations. The programs' regional and local focus made it popular addition to local television schedules and at its height was producing and distributing 26 annual episodes to 21 TV stations around the region. Since 2017, the Pacific Way has been developing 10 episodes per season for television and has been reintroduced to radio through its complementary podcasts. The half-hour show shares development stories about the Pacific for the Pacific. It covers important topics and key issues, such as climate change adaptation, health, youth employment, innovation in agriculture, fisheries management and the protection of cultural heritage.

=== Name and symbols ===
While the acronym "SPC" has been consistent since the organization's founding in 1947, the name and logo have evolved over the years. The organization's original name was the South Pacific Commission, which represented the limited nature of its membership and activities. The name was changed in 1997 to the Secretariat Pacific Community and later just the Pacific Community, reflecting the growth of membership across the entire Pacific region. The current logo was officially adopted in 2015.

The current flag was adopted on 6 December 1999 during a conference in Papeete. The current flag features a circle of stars (a star for each member of the organization), completed by an arch. The arch represents the secretariat which ties the countries together. Inside the circle figures an emblem consisting of sail, ocean and a palm tree. The sail and ocean symbolise interchange, while the sail itself represents a canoe and represents movement and change. The palm tree symbolises wealth. The colors intend to mirror the clear night skies of the Pacific (the dark blue field and the white stars). The turquoise sail, arch and lower wave symbolises youth and the island chains of the region.

The former flag, featured on blue field a white ring, being the lower right part replaced by a chain of small gold stars. Above the stars was a small white palm tree.

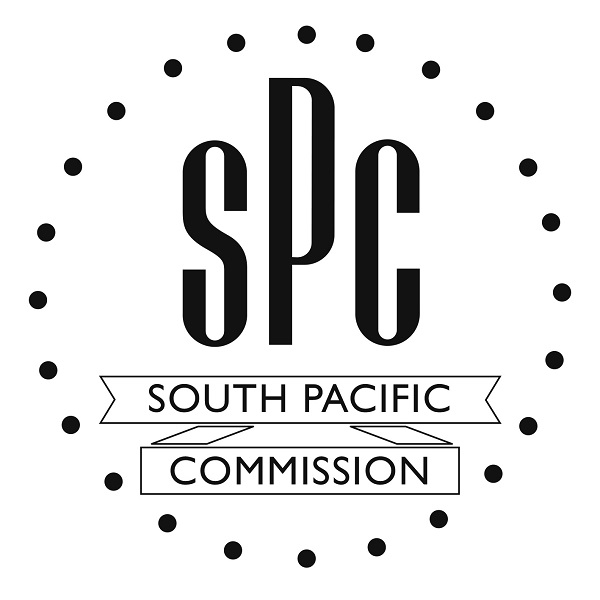
1960

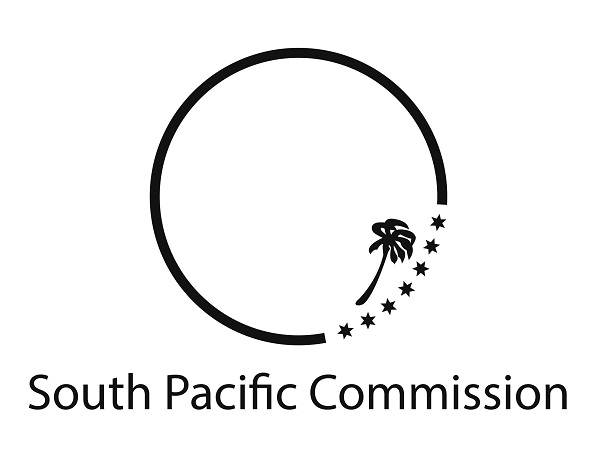
1970

South Pacific Commission ― Pacific Community
logos

== Membership ==
The Pacific Community includes 22 Pacific island countries and territories, which were all previously territories (or, in the case of Tonga, a protectorate) of the original founding members of the SPC, along with the developed countries of Australia, France, New Zealand, the United Kingdom, and the United States:

The population figures and also the GDP per capita figures are for the whole country. In some cases this includes regions outside the Pacific area.

The symbol ‡ indicates an independent state.

Member	Population (2020)	Area (km^{2})	EEZ Area (km^{2})	GDP per capita (USD, 2020)	Currency	UN member	Sovereign state / associated with	Status	Date of admission
American Samoa	56,813	200	404,391	11,245	USD	No	United States	Unorganized Unincorporated Territory	1983
Australia	25,882,100	7,692,024	8,148,250	53,321	AUD	Yes	‡		1947
Cook Islands	17,459	237	1,830,000	24,913	NZD	No	New Zealand	Freely Associated State	1980
Fiji	926,276	18,276	1,282,980	6,152	FJD	Yes	‡		1971
France	67,100,000	675,000	1,100,000	49,435	EUR	Yes	‡		1947
French Polynesia	275,918	4,167	4,767,240	22,308	XPF	No	France	Overseas Country	1983
Guam	168,801	540	221,504	34,153	USD	No	United States	Organized Unincorporated Territory	1983
Kiribati	119,940	811	3,441,810	1,636	AUD	Yes	‡		1983
Marshall Islands	54,590	181	1,990,530	4,337	USD	Yes	United States	Freely Associated State	1983
Micronesia	105,503	701	2,996,420	3,830	USD	Yes	United States	Freely Associated State	1983
Nauru	11,690	21	308,480	11,666	AUD	Yes	‡		1969
New Caledonia	273,015	18,576	1,422,540	37,448	XPF	No	France	Sui Generis Collectivity	1983
New Zealand	4,900,000	270,500	4,000,000	43,953	NZD	Yes	‡		1947
Niue	1,562	261	450,000	18,757	NZD	No	New Zealand	Freely Associated State	1980
Northern Mariana Islands	56,608	464	749,268	23,550	USD	No	United States	Commonwealth	1983
Palau	17,930	444	603,978	2,854	USD	Yes	United States	Freely Associated State	1983
Papua New Guinea	8,934,475	462,840	2,402,290	2,854	PGK	Yes	‡		1975
Pitcairn Islands	50	47	836,108	N/A	NZD	No	United Kingdom	Overseas Territory	1983
Samoa	198,646	2,934	127,950	4,284	SAT	Yes	‡		1965
Solomon Islands	712,071	28,230	1,553,440	2,295	SBD	Yes	‡		1978
Tokelau	1,506	12	319,031	6,882	NZD	No	New Zealand	Dependent Territory	1983
Tonga	99,780	749	659,558	5,081	TOP	Yes	‡		1983
Tuvalu	10,580	26	749,790	4,223	AUD	Yes	‡		1978
United Kingdom	66,000,000	242,495	6,805,586	40,284	GBP	Yes	‡		1947 (Note: Withdrew from 1 Jan 1996 until it rejoined 1 Jan 1998; Withdrew again from 1 Jan 2005 until it rejoined again on 2 Dec 2021)
United States	324,000,000	9,800,000	11,700,000	55,800	USD	Yes	‡		1947
Vanuatu	294,688	12,281	663,251	3,260	VUV	Yes	‡		1983
Wallis and Futuna	11,441	142	258,269	12,848	XPF	No	France	Overseas Collectivity	1983

Notes

The SPC is concentrated on providing technical and scientific advice to its member governments and administrations, particularly in areas where small island states lack the wherewithal to maintain purely national cadres of expertise, or in areas where regional co-operation or interaction is necessary.

The operational budget of the Pacific Community in 2018 was approximately €82 million. The organization is financially supported through a combination of membership fees and donor funding. Its major funding partners include the European Union, the Australian Department of Foreign Affairs and Trade, the New Zealand Ministry of Foreign Affairs, and the governments of France and the United States. Additional funding and knowledge partners include:

- Australian Bureau of Statistics
- Australian Centre for International Agricultural Research
- Australian Council for Educational Research
- Conservation International
- Food and Agriculture Organization
- French Development Agency
- French Facility for Global Environment
- German Corporation for International Cooperation
- Global Environment Facility
- Government of Sweden
- International Atomic Energy Agency
- International Foundation for Aids to Navigation
- International Fund for Agricultural Development
- International Labour Organization
- International Seafood Sustainability Foundation
- Korea Institute of Ocean Science & Technology
- Melanesian Spearhead Group
- Office of the High Commissioner for Human Rights
- UN Women
- UNICEF
- United Nations Development Programme
- United Nations Population Fund
- United States Agency for International Development
- United States Centers for Disease Control and Prevention
- Western and Central Pacific Fisheries Commission
- World Bank
- World Health Organization

=== Divisions ===
The SPC works across more than 25 sectors. It is involved in such areas as fisheries science, public health surveillance, geoscience and conservation of plant genetic resources for food and agriculture, statistics and education. Using a multi-sector approach in responding to its members' development priorities, SPC draws on skills and capabilities from around the region and internationally, and supports the empowerment of Pacific communities and sharing of expertise and skills between countries and territories.

SPC currently has nine divisions:

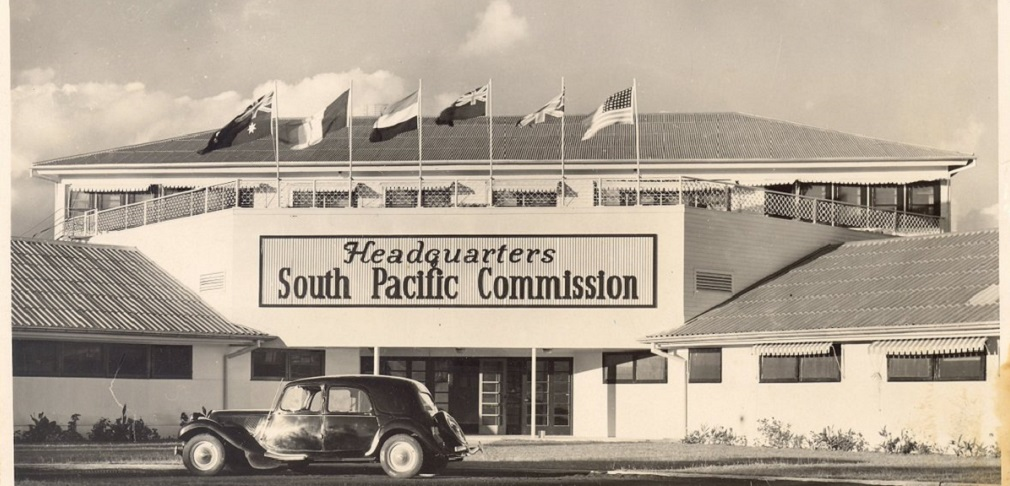
Original SPC HQ in Nouméa

- Climate Change and Environmental Stability (CCES)
- Educational Quality and Assessment Program (EQAP)
- Fisheries, Aquaculture and Marine Ecosystems (FAME)
- Geoscience Energy and Maritime (GEM)
- Land Resources Division (LRD)
- Public Health Division (PHD)
- Regional Rights Resource Team (RRRT)
- Social Development Program (SDP)
- Statistics for Development (SDD)

== SPC Directors-General ==
The Director General is appointed for a two-year term of office which can be extended by two additional two-year terms (maximum service period of six years).

Directors-General of South Pacific Commission ― Pacific Community
Directors-General	Country	Start date	End date	Comment
Stuart Minchin	Australia	23 Jan 2020	present	
Colin Tukuitonga	Niue	5 Jan 2014	23 Jan 2020	
Jimmie Rodgers	Solomon Islands	6 Jan 2006	5 Jan 2014	
Lourdes T. Pangelinan	Guam	6 Jan 2000	5 Jan 2006	
Robert B. Dun	Australia	8 Jan 1996	5 Jan 2000	
Ati George Sokomanu	Vanuatu	6 Jan 1993	7 Jan 1996	
Jacques Iékawé	New Caledonia	10 Mar 1992	10 Mar 1992	Died before assuming office
Atanraoi Baiteke	Kiribati	16 Jun 1989	5 Jan 1993	
Jon Tikivanotau Jonassen	Cook Islands	1 Jan 1989	15 Jun 1989	Interim
Palauni M. Tuiasosopo	American Samoa	9 Dec 1986	31 Dec 1988	
Francis Bugotu	Solomon Islands	1 Jul 1982	30 Nov 1986	
Mititaiagimene Young Vivian	Niue	1 Jul 1979	3 Jun 1982	
E. Macu Salato	Fiji	9 Dec 1975	30 Jun 1979	
Fred Betham	Western Samoa	1 Nov 1971	30 Nov 1975	
John E. de Young	United States	18 Feb 1971	31 Oct 1971	Interim
Afoafouvale Misimoa	Western Samoa	1 Jan 1970	18 Feb 1971	
Gawain Westray Bell	United Kingdom	1 Jan 1967	11 Dec 1969	
William D. Forsyth	Australia	24 Mar 1963	31 Dec 1966	reappointed
Thomas Richard Smith	New Zealand	1 Mar 1958	2 Mar 1963	
Ralph Clairon Bedell	United States	1 Mar 1955	28 Feb 1958	
Sir Brian Freeston	United Kingdom	12 Nov 1951	12 Nov 1954	
William D. Forsyth	Australia	1 Nov 1948	3 Jun 1951	Founding official

== See also ==
=== CROP agencies ===
- Pacific Islands Forum
- Pacific Regional Environment Programme
- University of the South Pacific
- Forum Fisheries Agency
- South Pacific Tourism Organisation
- Pacific Aviation Safety Office

=== Others ===
- Centre for Pacific Crops and Trees
- Festival of Pacific Arts
- Pacific Games
- Pacific Island Farmers Organisation Network (PIFON)
- Pacific Islands Private Sector Organisation (PIPSO)
- Asia-Pacific Fishery Commission (APFIC)
- Western and Central Pacific Fisheries Commission
- International organization
