= Mataiapo =

A mataiapo or mata'iapo is a hereditary chiefly title in the Cook Islands. The head of a sub-tribe, subject to the ariki (paramount chief) as far as the whole tribe is concerned and owing him traditional allegiance, but otherwise largely independent as head of his own family group and owning land in his own right.

Today they still accord the ariki respect and assist in matters concerning land, traditional ceremonies and so forth. In pre-Christian times, the mataiapo were traditionally appointed by the ariki and given their titles in recognition of bravery in warfare or service to the ariki. With their titles came land and respect.

They are invested by the ariki in huge ceremonies that still take place today. A significant act in the ceremony is when the mataiapo bites the ear of a whole roasted pig (usually the largest to be found in the village) which immediately indicates that the person has become a mataiapo.

Precolonial contact, genealogical records clearly list women as hereditary title holders, yet according to European accounts, after the arrival of European missionaries, women were allowed to hold the titles of ariki, mataiapo and rangatira. The latter is a sub-chief, and in ancient times were usually the brothers or sisters of the ariki.

== See also ==
- House of Ariki
- Kōmono
