= Jon Jonassen =

Cook Islands diplomat

Jon Tikivanotau Michael Jonassen MBE (24 July 1949 – 2023) was a Cook Islands civil servant, diplomat, composer, and political scientist. He was the Cook Islands' High Commissioner to New Zealand from 1997 to 1999.

== Early life and education ==
Jonassen was born in Rarotonga and grew up on Rarotonga and Aitutaki. He was educated at Arorangi School, Araura Primary School, and Tereora College in the Cook Islands, and Mount Albert Grammar School in New Zealand. He later attended Brigham Young University–Hawaii, graduating with a BSc in business management and a BA in history and government, as well as studying at the University of the South Pacific. He later studied at the University of Hawaiʻi at Mānoa, graduating with a Master of Arts in Pacific Island Studies in 1992, and a PhD in political science in 1996.

== Civil servant ==
From 1983 to 1986 he served as the Cook Islands' Secretary of Foreign Affairs. In 1987 he was appointed director of programmes for the South Pacific Commission, serving as acting secretary-general in 1989. In 1991 he returned to the Cook Islands to become secretary of the new Ministry of Cultural Development.

== Academic ==
In 1993 he returned to Brigham Young University–Hawaii as a professor of political science. He took a leave of absence from 1997 to 1999 while he was serving as Cook Islands' high commissioner to New Zealand, Australia, Fiji, and Papua New Guinea. He returned to BYU-H, where he became director of Pacific Islands studies. He is currently emeritus professor of political science and Pacific Islands studies.

Jonassen's work has focused on documenting Cook Islands culture, including traditional songs and chants. He published his first collection of Cook Islands legends while a university student. He is also a composer, and has composed more than 500 songs, including Mou Piri, and E Tai Roimata.

== Recognition ==
He was made a member of the Order of the British Empire for services to Cook Islands culture and the public service in the 2014 New Year Honours.
