= Cook Islands News =

Newspaper published in Rarotonga, Cook Islands

- Type: Daily newspaper
- Owner(s): John and Liz Woods
- Editor: Rashneel Kumar
- Founded: 1945 80 years ago
- Headquarters: Avarua, Rarotonga, Cook Islands
- Circulation: 2000
- Website: http://www.cookislandsnews.com

The Cook Islands News is a daily newspaper published in Rarotonga in the Cook Islands. It is the national newspaper of the Cook Islands. Its print version is published daily from Monday to Saturday. Originally government-owned, it was privatized in 1989.

== Editing ==
From 2014 to 2018 the News was edited by Cameron Scott. In March 2019 it appointed Jonathan Milne, former editor of the New Zealand Sunday Star-Times, as editor. In July 2020 Milne returned to New Zealand to become editor of Newsroom Pro. On 28 August 2020 Rashneel Kumar was appointed editor and Katrina Tanirau associate editor.

== Controversy ==
The News's history has seen frequent clashes with politicians over regulation, with journalists being banned from the Cook Islands Parliament for "unfair" coverage. In 2001 senior journalist Jason Brown was banned from covering Parliament for two weeks following a complaint that his coverage was unfair to and misrepresented Deputy Prime Minister Norman George. In June 2020 politicians attempted to ban journalist Rashneel Kumar from reporting on Parliament for reporting on their travel allowances, but ultimately decided against it. However, Speaker Niki Rattle warned that she would be quick to ban any journalist who reported unfairly on Parliament in the future.
