= House of Ariki =

Council of chiefs of the Cook islands

House of Ariki Te Are Ariki
- Coat of arms of the Cook Islands

Type
- Type: House of Chiefs of the Cook Islands

History
- Founded: September 23, 1966

Leadership
- President (Te Kaumaiti Nui): Tou Travel Ariki since December 2008
- Clerk (Te-O-Tari-Kura): Dr Tuaine Unuia since 25 March 2024

Structure
- Seats: 24
- Length of term: Appointment for life

Elections
- Voting system: Appointed by the King's Representative

Meeting place
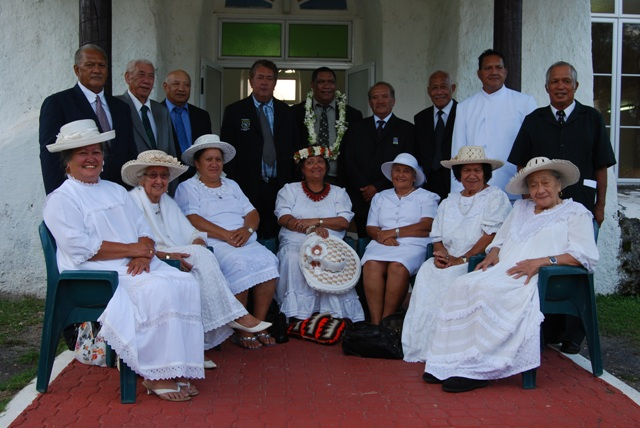
- Ariki at the opening of the 39th Annual General Meeting of the House of Ariki in December 2010

The House of Ariki (Cook Islands Māori: 'Are Ariki) is a parliamentary body in the Cook Islands. It is composed of Cook Islands high chiefs (ariki), appointed by the King's Representative. While it functions in a similar way to the House of Lords and the Senate of Canada, the country's parliament is officially unicameral. There are up to twenty-four members, representing different islands of the Cooks.

Its function is to:

"consider such matters relative to the welfare of the people of the Cook Islands as may be submitted to it by [Parliament] for its consideration, and it shall express its opinion and make recommendations thereon to [Parliament]"

It may only discuss matters put to it by the democratically elected Parliament, and may only voice suggestions in return.

== Formation ==
The establishment of the House of Ariki was suggested in May 1965 during negotiations on the new constitution of the Cook Islands prior to independence. The initial proposals were for it to have six Ariki from Rarotonga and eight from the outer islands, with the House meeting annually under the chairmanship of the High Commissioner. Amendments to the legislation on the new constitution were passed by the New Zealand Parliament in June, providing for the creation of the House.

The House was established in September the following year, consisting of ten chiefs. It was intended to confer additional legitimacy and strength to the newly self-governing nation, and to help it define its national identity. Henry stated:

"The ariki [and other chiefly ranks] and their tribes are the backbone of all nations in this world. For any nation to allow this backbone to be broken or to disappear would mean that they are relying on a foreign backbone for their survival."

The House was inaugurated by the High Commissioner Leslie James Davis on 23 September 1966. Vakatini Tepo of Rarotonga was chosen as its first president.

== Composition ==
The members are:

- The four ariki of the islands of Aitutaki and Manuae;
- The three ariki of the island of Atiu;
- The ariki of the island of Mangaia;
- The two ariki of both the islands of Rakahanga; and Manihiki;
- The three ariki of the island of Mauke;
- The three ariki of the island of Mitiaro;
- The ariki of the island of Penrhyn;
- The ariki of the islands of Pukapuka and Nassau;
- The six ariki of the island of Rarotonga;

The incumbent president (Kaumaiti Nui) of the House of Ariki is Tou Travel Ariki (Mitiaro), having most recently been re-elected in 2023. As of 2019, the vice-president (Kaumaiti Iti) was Tinomana Tokerau Munro Ariki.

== Criticism ==
According to Ron Crocombe and Jon Tikivanotau Jonassen:

"The House of Ariki was created to marginalize the ariki. Most of them had opposed the party that won the election at self-government, so it created and quarantined them in a House with dignity but no power. To marginalize ariki further, that party later created a Koutu Nui of mata'iapo and rangatira (lesser chiefs) many of whom had supported the party."

== June 2008 coup claim ==
On 13 June 2008, a small majority of members of the House of Ariki attempted a coup, claiming to dissolve the elected government and to take control of the country's leadership. "Basically we are dissolving the leadership, the prime minister and the deputy prime minister and the ministers," chief Makea Vakatini Joseph Ariki explained. The Cook Islands Herald suggested that the Ariki were attempting thereby to regain some of their traditional prestige or mana.

Prime Minister Jim Marurai described the take-over move as "ill-founded and nonsensical". Police commissioner Pat Tasker added that it was "laughable", and that the police did not intend to take it seriously. By 23 June, the situation appeared to have normalised, with members of the House of Ariki accepting to return to their regular duties.

== See also ==
- List of presidents of the House of Ariki
- Great Council of Chiefs of Fiji
- Malvatu Mauri (House of Chiefs) of Vanuatu
