= Ariki =

Chiefly or noble rank in Polynesia

An ariki (New Zealand, Cook Islands), ꞌariki (Easter Island), aliki (Tokelau, Tuvalu), ali‘i (Samoa, Hawai‘i), ari'i (Society Islands, Tahiti), aiki or hakaiki (Marquesas Islands), akariki (Gambier Islands) or ‘eiki (Tonga) is or was a member of a hereditary chiefly or noble rank in Polynesia.

== New Zealand ==
Political leadership or governance in Māori society has traditionally come from two overlapping groups of people – the ariki and the rangatira. The ariki are the "persons of the highest rank and seniority". As the "high-ranking first-born children of first-born children", ariki inherit their positions from their forebears. In particular, their "supreme rank [comes] from the conjunction of a number of senior descent lines from founding ancestors, and ultimately from the gods". Their mana combines hereditary, personal and theocratic elements. In Māori culture ariki were men or women. A modern example of a woman in this leadership role is Te Atairangikaahu (r. 1966–2006) the paramount head or Māori Queen of the Waikato federation of tribes.

Ariki do not operate in simple hierarchical organisations; despite what "government officers were inclined to believe", ariki have never been "the apex of a structured hierarchy of institutionalised tribal authority". Many positions overlap, with ariki holding multiple roles, including "head of an iwi, the rangatira of a hapū and the kaumātua of a whānau". Similarly, in times past, "a tohunga may have also been the head of a whanau but quite often was also a rangatira and an ariki".

The Māori King Movement is headed by the Māori King or Queen, who bears the title Te Arikinui, literally "The Great (leading) Ariki".

== Cook Islands ==
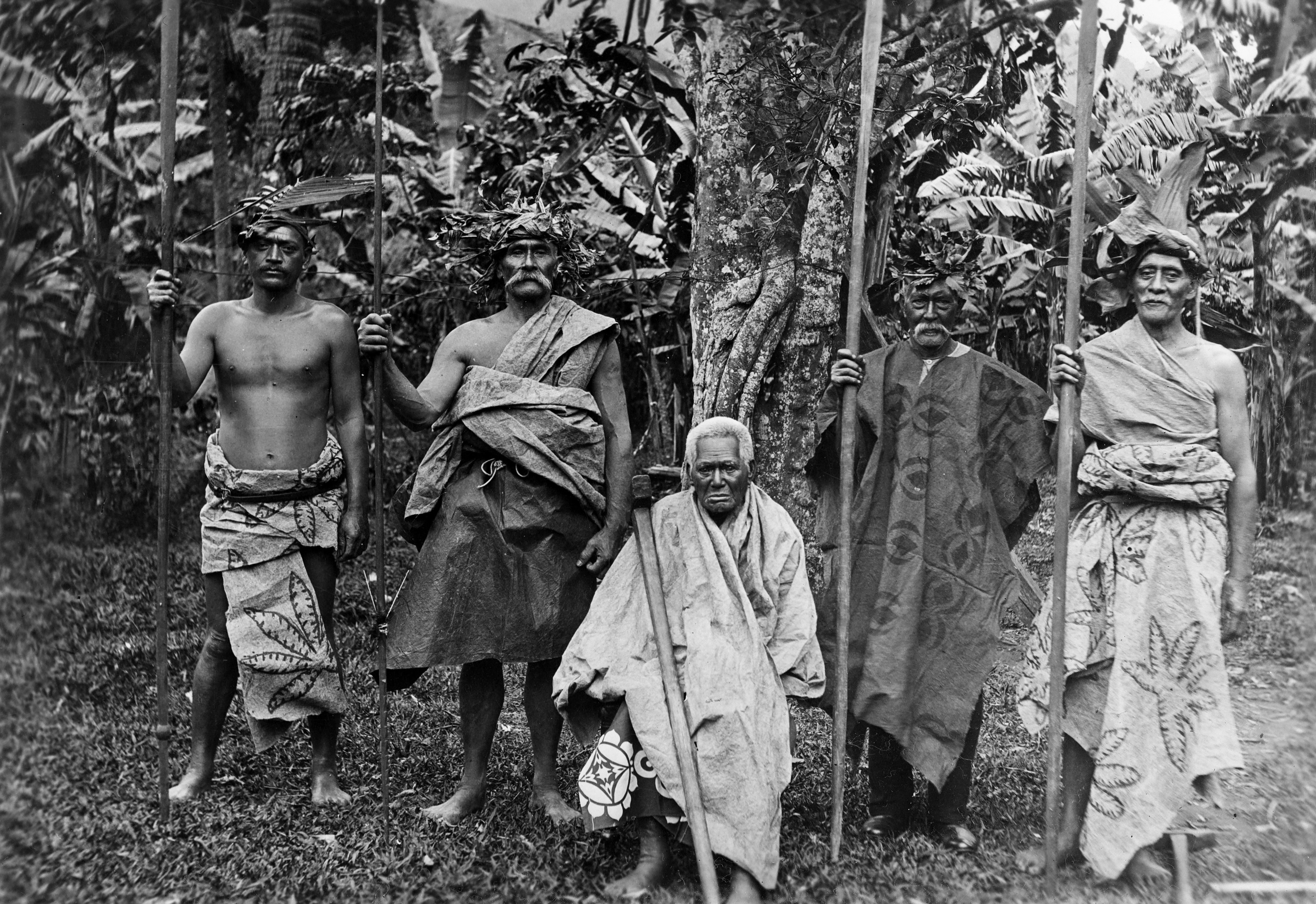
Makea Karika Ariki (sitting) and nobles of the Makea Karika tribe, Rarotonga

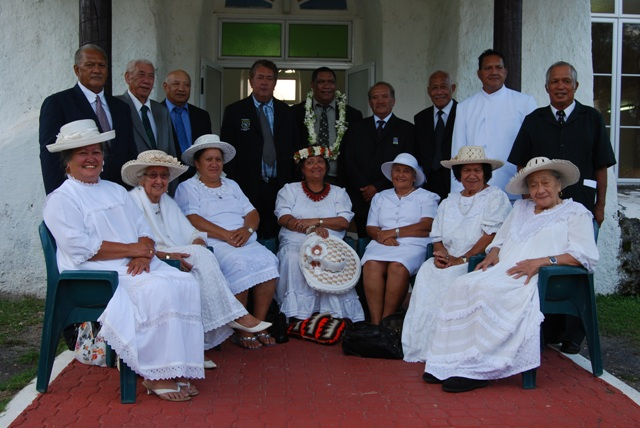
Arikis at the opening of the 39th Annual General Meeting of the House of Ariki (Cook Islands Herald)

Each island in the Cook Islands was ruled by a number of ariki (high chiefs). Rarotonga had about five or six, and most of the other islands had about three. Each ariki ruled an ivi or ngati (tribe). Beneath each ariki in the social hierarchy were a number of mataiapo and rangatira (minor chiefs) of noble rank. Ariki are either men or women. In 2009 a group of ariki challenged the legitimacy of the government.

A chief's control over their people was related to their mana (power), which came not only from their birth but also from their achievements and status, and could be gained or lost. An ariki who lost popularity with their people could also be seen as having a decline in mana, which could have led to their loss of control.

Having a control of tapu (sacred matters) was a powerful weapon for the ariki. For supernatural reasons, certain activities were forbidden and since the ariki had control over what was or was not forbidden, this gave their considerable power. It was the people's strong belief in an ariki's mana and control over all things tapu that allowed them to take control of their people without the need for physical enforcement.

The ariki, mataiapo and rangatira titles are passed down through the family to the present day. Some of the ancient ceremonies and traditions are still being practiced in the Cook Islands.

The House of Ariki ('Are Ariki) is a parliamentary body in the Cook Islands. It was established in 1967 shortly after self-government and is composed of the Cook Islands high chiefs. Scholars Ron Crocombe and Jon Tikivanotau Jonassen have argued that it was created to marginalize the ariki, giving them dignity but very limited power.

== See also ==
- 'Aliki (Wallisian and Futunan Polynesian languages)
- Ali'i (Hawai'i)
- Paramount chief (Oceania)
