= 2012 Palauan general election =

- 6 November 2012
- Presidential election
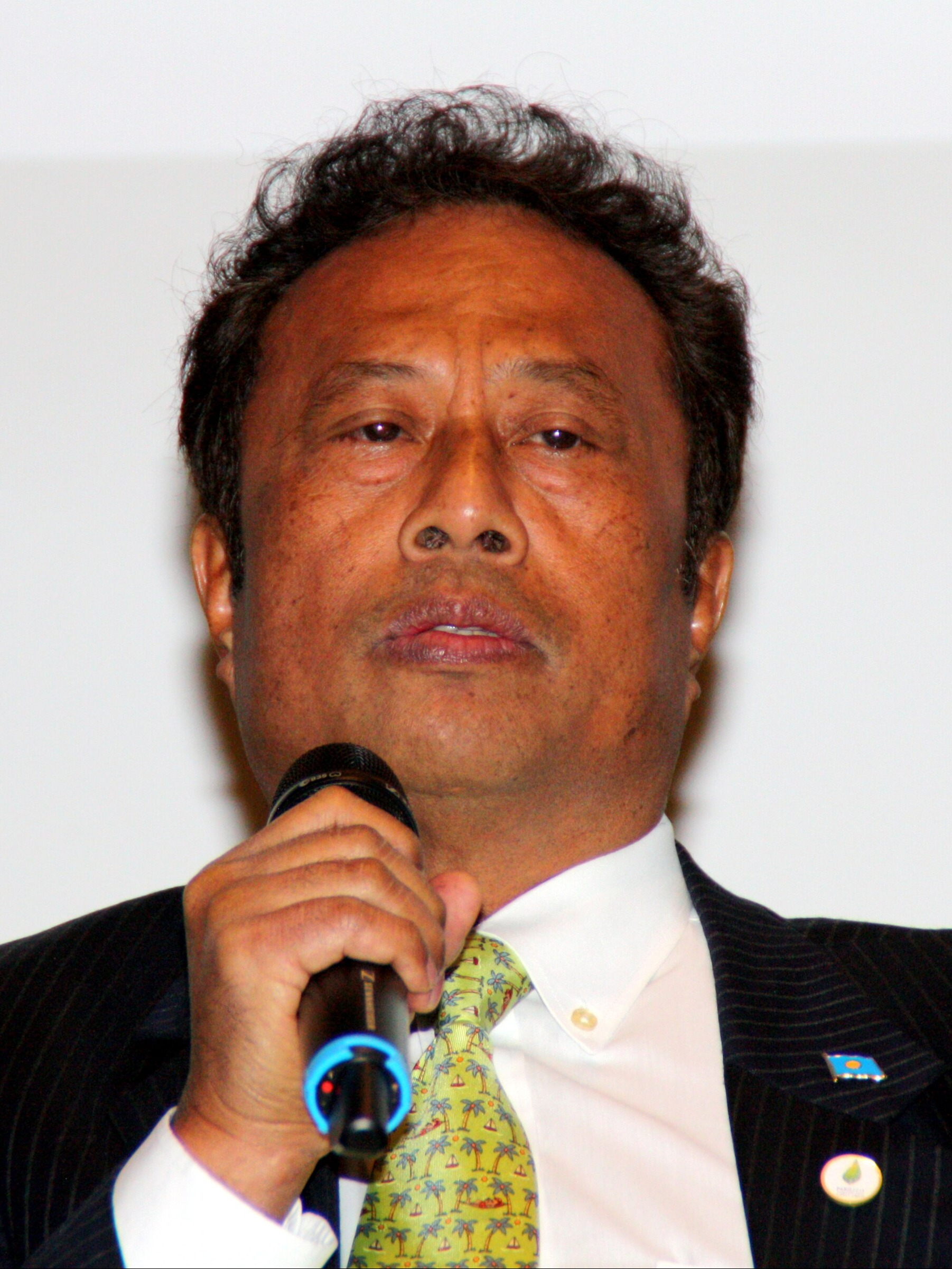

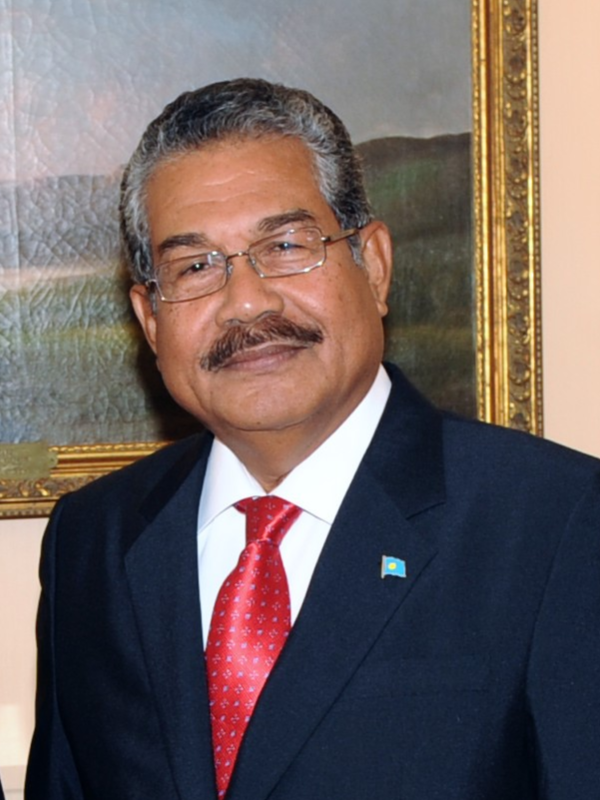
Nominee	Tommy Remengesau	Johnson Toribiong
Party	Independent	Independent
Popular vote	6,140	4,287
Percentage	58.89%	41.11%
President before election
Johnson Toribiong
Independent
Elected President
Tommy Remengesau
Independent
- Vice Presidential election
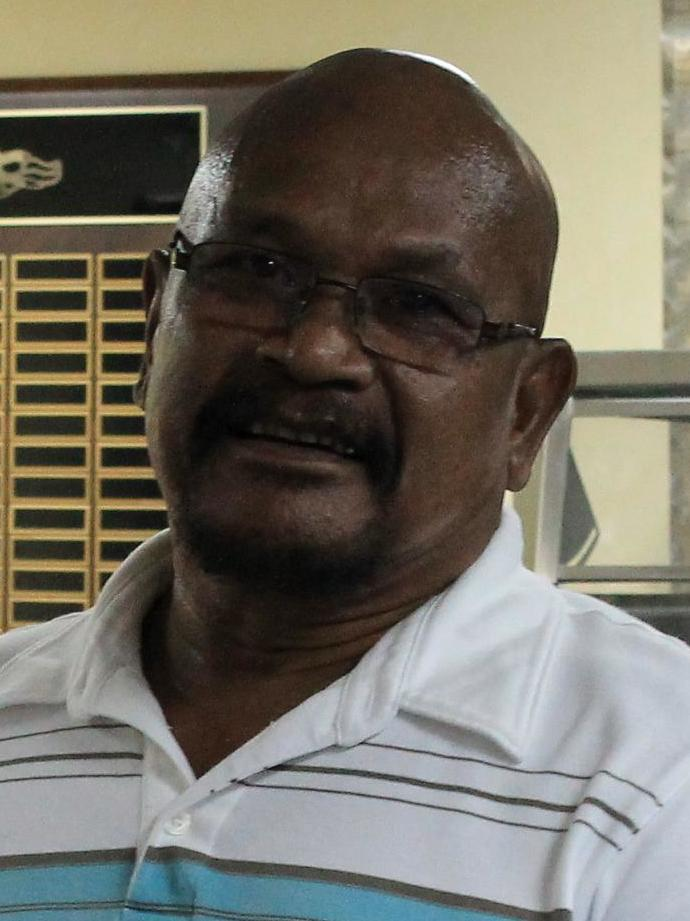

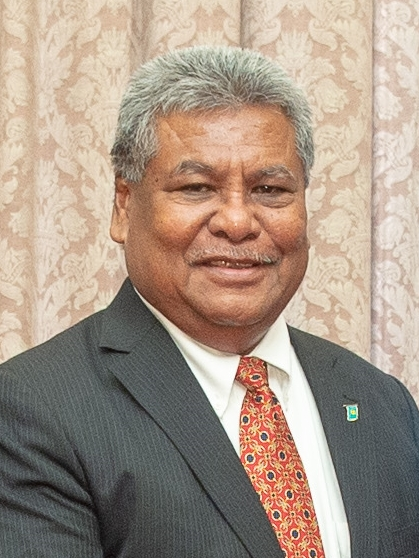
Nominee	Antonio Bells	Kerai Mariur
Party	Independent	Independent
Popular vote	5,303	4,847
Percentage	52.25%	47.75%

General elections were held in Palau on 6 November 2012. Former president Tommy Remengesau defeated his successor, incumbent Johnson Toribiong, who had been elected in 2008. Antonio Bells was elected vice-president, defeating Kerai Mariur, who had finished first in the primary elections on 26 September.

== Electoral system ==
The president and vice president elections had primary elections on 26 September, from which the top two candidates qualified for the presidential general election on 6 November.

15,305 voters registered to vote, an increase of 1,516 voters from the 2008 elections.

== Results ==
=== President ===
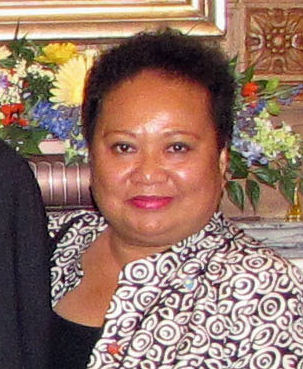
Sandra Pierantozzi placed third in the primary.

Three candidates contested the presidential primary: Incumbent President Johnson Toribiong, former President Tommy Remengesau Jr., and former Vice President Sandra Pierantozzi, who served as vice president from 2001 to 2005. Remengesau and Toribiong, who placed first and second respectively in the primary, advanced to the general election.

Candidate	Primary		General	
Candidate	Votes	%	Votes	%
Tommy Remengesau	4,617	49.08	6,140	58.89
Johnson Toribiong	3,100	32.95	4,287	41.11
Sandra Pierantozzi	1,690	17.97		
Total	9,407	100.00	10,427	100.00
Valid votes			10,427	99.51
Invalid/blank votes			51	0.49
Total votes			10,478	100.00
Registered voters/turnout	15,305	–		
Source: IFES, IFES

=== Vice president ===
Four candidates contested the vice presidential primary election:

- Antonio Bells, former Speaker of the House of Delegates
- Dr. Stevenson Kuartei, Minister of Health
- Kerai Mariur, incumbent vice president, first elected in 2008
- Jackson Ngiraingas, Public Infrastructure, Industries and Commerce Minister

Mariur and Bells, who placed first and second, advanced to the general election.

Candidate	Primary		General	
Candidate	Votes	%	Votes	%
Kerai Mariur	2,963	31.73	4,847	47.75
Antonio Bells	2,851	30.53	5,303	52.25
Stephen Kuartei	2,556	27.37		
Jackson Ngiraingas	969	10.38		
Total	9,339	100.00	10,150	100.00
Registered voters/turnout	15,305	–		
Source: OTV, PI Report

=== Senate ===
Party	Votes	%	Seats	+/–
Independents	92,807	100.00	13	0
Total	92,807	100.00	13	0
Total votes	9,406	–		
Registered voters/turnout	15,305	61.46		
Source: IPU

==== By candidate ====
Candidate	Votes	Notes
Surangel Whipps Jr.	5,717	Elected
Elias Camsek Chin	5,252	Elected
Raynold Oilouch	5,242	Elected
Mason Whipps	4,994	Elected
Mark Rudimch	4,306	Elected
Hokkons Baules	4,279	Elected
Phillip Reklai	4,270	Elected
Mlib Tmetuchl	3,423	Elected
Uduch Sengebau Senior	3,419	Elected
Rukebai Inabo	3,256	Elected
Katharine Kesolei	3,192	Elected
Regis Akitaya	3,138	Elected
Greg Ngirmang	3,160	Elected
Earnest Ongidobel	3,032	
Joel Toribiong	2,974	
Salvador Remoket	2,907	
John Skebong	2,814	
Alan Marbou	2,791	
Alan Seid	2,731	
Regina K Mesebeluu	2,633	
Laurentino Ulechong	2,564	
Sandra Sumang-Pierantozzi	2,334	
Alfonso Diaz	2,191	
Paul W Ueki	2,104	
Dr Caleb Otto	1,735	
Roman Yano	1,543	
Dilmei Olkeriil	1,346	
Santy Asanuma	1,158	
J Risong Tarkong	1,172	
Moses Uludong	1,144	
Gale Ngirmidol	941	
Robert Becheserrak	529	
Semdiu Decherong	363	
Ismael Worswick	153	
Total	92,807	
Source: Psephos, IPU

=== House of Delegates ===
State	Candidate	Votes	Notes
Aimeliik	Marino O. Ngemaes	233	Elected
Aimeliik	Kalistus Ngirturong	186	
Airai	Tmewang Rengulbai	369	Elected
Airai	Frank Kyota	344	
Angaur	Horace Rafael	114	Elected
Angaur	Mario Gulibert	109	
Hatohobei	Wayne Andrew	45	Elected
Hatohobei	Sebastian Marino	41	
Kayangel	Noah Kemesong	135	Elected
Kayangel	Edwin Chiokai	88	
Kayangel	Florencio Yamada	26	
Koror	Alexander Merep	571	Elected
Koror	Salvador Tellames	323	
Koror	Felix Francisco	298	
Melekeok	Lentcer Basilius	233	Elected
Melekeok	Brian Melairei	117	
Ngaraard	Gibson Kanai	293	Elected
Ngaraard	Martin Sokau	175	
Ngaraard	Priscilla Subris	112	
Ngarchelong	Marhence Madrangchar	209	Elected
Ngarchelong	Masao Salvador	202	
Ngarchelong	Don Bukurrou	61	
Ngardmau	Lucio Ngiraiwet	112	Elected
Ngardmau	Rebluud Kesolei	104	
Ngaremlengui	Swenny Ongidobel	187	Elected
Ngaremlengui	Portia Franz	150	
Ngatpang	Jerry Nabeyama	105	Elected
Ngatpang	Lee Otobed	104	
Ngchesar	Sabino Anastacio	148	Elected
Ngchesar	Secilil Eldebechel	139	
Ngiwal	Masasinge Arurang	144	Elected
Ngiwal	Eugene Termeteet	118	
Ngiwal	Francis Llecholch	62	
Ngiwal	Pablo Rrull	48	
Peleliu	Jonathan Isechal	149	Elected
Peleliu	Joseph Giramur	135	
Peleliu	Charles Desengei Matsutaro	99	
Sonsorol	Yutaka Gibbons Jr.	66	Elected
Sonsorol	Celestine Yangilmau	64	
Source: Psephos
