= 2016 Palauan general election =

- 1 November 2016
- Presidential election
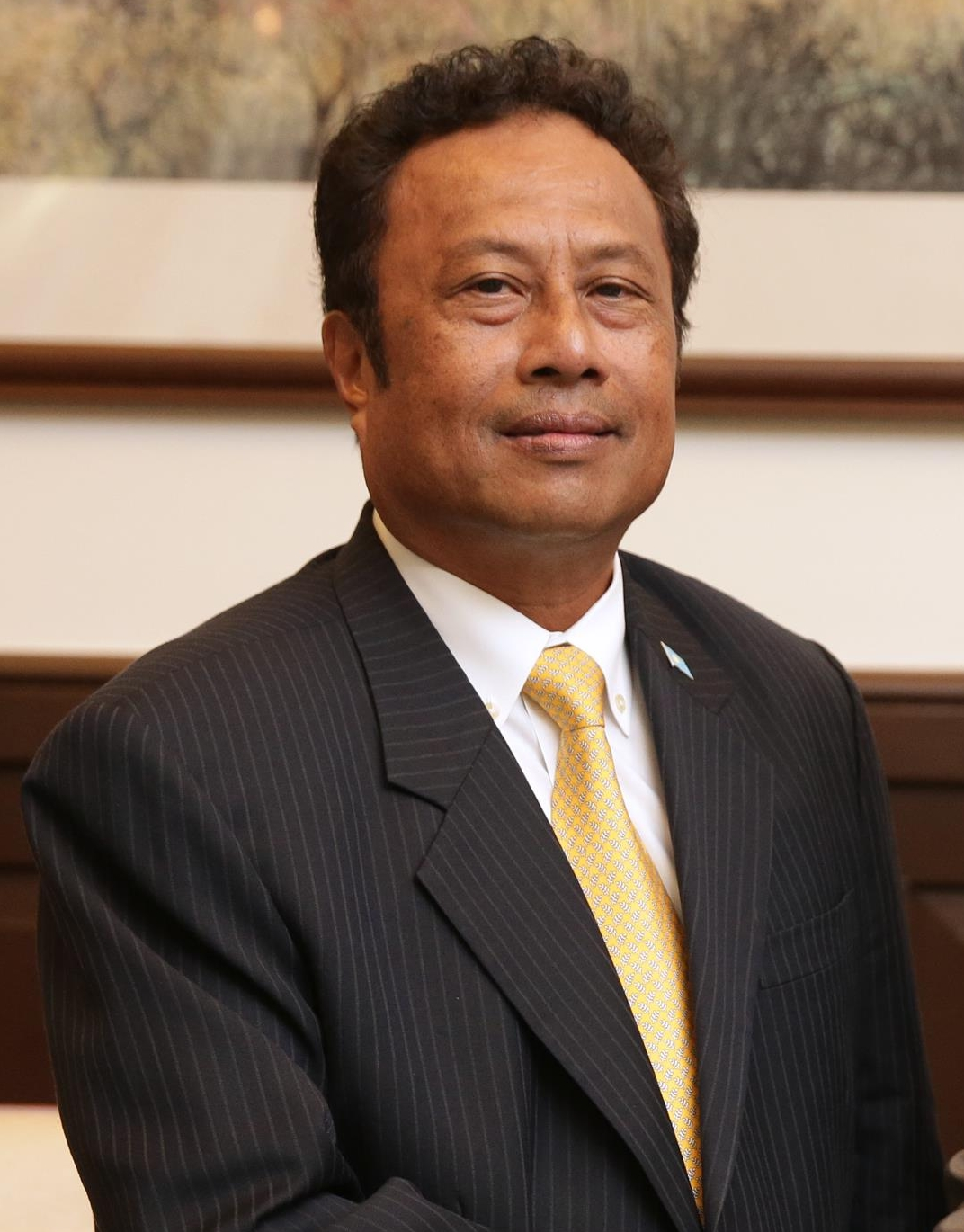

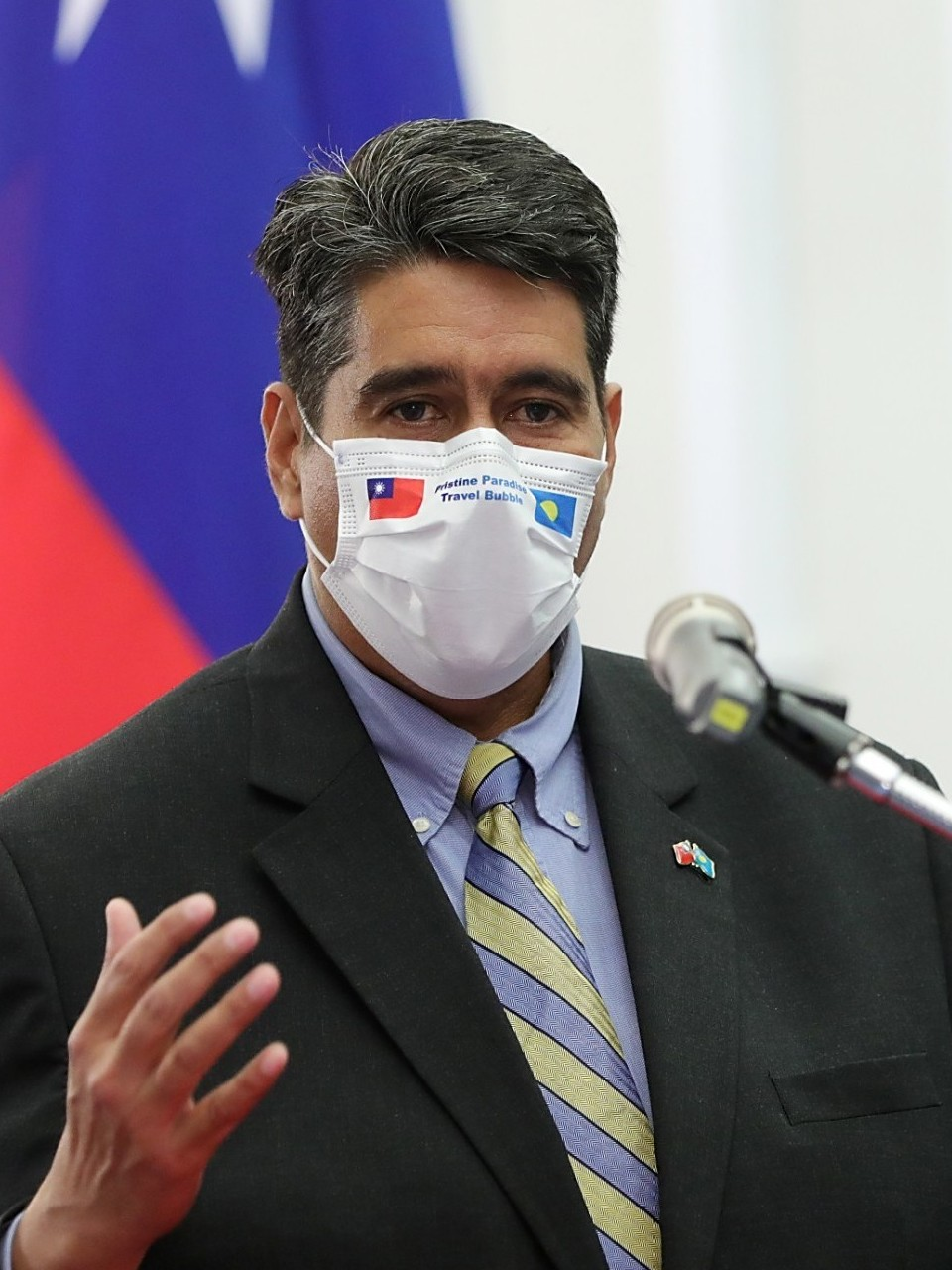
Nominee	Tommy Remengesau	Surangel Whipps Jr.
Party	Independent	Independent
Popular vote	5,129	4,865
Percentage	51.32%	48.68%
- Vice presidential election
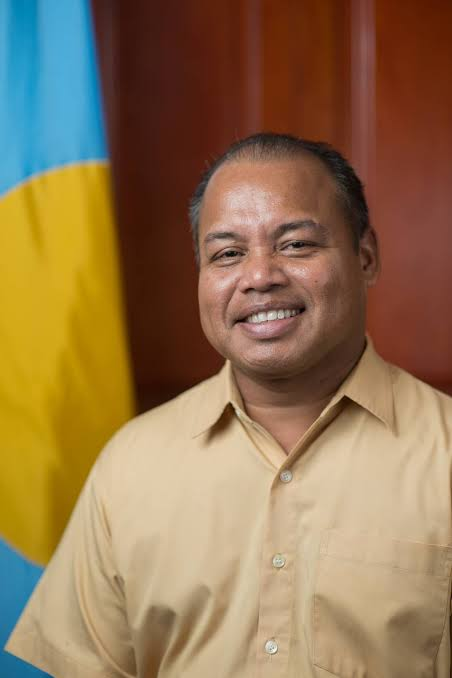

Nominee	Raynold Oilouch	Yositaka Adachi
Party	Independent	Independent
Popular vote	5,222	4,646
Percentage	52.92%	47.08%
President before election
Tommy Remengesau
Independent
Elected President
Tommy Remengesau
Independent

General elections were held in Palau on 1 November 2016 to elect a President and the National Congress. Incumbent President Tommy Remengesau was challenged by his brother-in-law, Surangel Whipps Jr. for the presidency, emerging as the top two in the primary elections on 27 September. Remengesau was subsequently re-elected with 51% of the vote.

== Electoral system ==
The President and Vice President were elected using the two-round system. The 16 members of the House of Delegates were elected in single-member constituencies based on the states using first-past-the-post voting. The 13 members of the Senate were elected from a single nationwide constituency by block voting, with each voter having 13 votes to cast. The number of senators elected to the Palau National Congress was planned to be reduced to 11 from the previous 13 for the 2016 general election, but this decision was reversed.

== Presidential candidates ==
Four candidates had declared their intention to seek the presidency in 2016, including Remengesau, who was seeking re-election.

- Antonio Bells, Vice President of Palau (2013–2017)
- Sandra Pierantozzi, Vice President of Palau (2001–2005), Minister of Health (2001–2004), Minister of State (2009–2010)
- Tommy Remengesau, President of Palau (2001–2009, 2013–Present), Vice President of Palau (1993–2001)
- Surangel Whipps Jr., Senator

== Campaign ==
The deadline to file nominating petitions for a presidential run was 3 August.

President Tommy Remengesau declared his candidacy for re-election on 1 March at a campaign kick-off held at the Ngarachamayong Cultural Center. Senator Surangel Whipps Jr., who began campaigning for president in 2015 and announced his candidacy earlier in the year, became the first candidate to file his candidacy with the Palau Elections Commission Office on 20 July 2016. Sandra Pierantozzi, the former vice president under Remengesau, was the only woman to enter the race.

A presidential debate with all four candidates was held on 17 August 2016, at the Palau Community College (PCC). The debate was jointly sponsored by the Palau Media Council and the Palau Community College.

== Results ==
=== President ===
The presidential primaries were held on 27 September, with Remengesau and Whipps Jr. finishing as the top two to advance to the general election on 1 November. Following their losses in the primaries, Sandra Pierantozzi and Antonio Bells both endorsed Whipps Jr.

Early results released on 2 November initially showed Whipps leading with 1,832 votes, with incumbent President Remengesau trailing with 1,667 votes. However, by 4 November, Remengesau had regained a slim lead with 4,108 votes, while Whipps trailed by just 78 votes, or 4,030 votes. The election was decided by the absentee ballots, which the Palau Election Commission said would be counted after 8 November. Elenita Bennie Brel, the administrator of the national Election Service, announced that final results for the presidential would not be known until later in November, since absentee and provisional ballots would be sorted and counted in the presence of representatives of both presidential campaigns. Bennie Brel explained, "We want to make this election very fair and transparent for everyone who has concern and wants to come in. So after November 8 the counting of the absentee ballots and then it takes another 15 days for the board [of the electoral commission] to certify them." On 10 November it was announced that Remengesau had been re-elected.

Candidate	Primary		General	
Candidate	Votes	%	Votes	%
Tommy Remengesau	4,949	50.41	5,129	51.32
Surangel Whipps Jr.	3,762	38.32	4,865	48.68
Sandra Pierantozzi	833	8.48		
Antonio Bells	274	2.79		
Total	9,818	100.00	9,994	100.00
Registered voters/turnout			15,890	–
Source: President of Palau, Palau Embassy

=== Vice President ===
Candidate	Primary		General	
Candidate	Votes	%	Votes	%
Raynold Oilouch	4,553	46.70	5,222	52.92
Yositaka Adachi	3,001	30.78	4,646	47.08
Mlib Tmetuchl	2,195	22.52		
Total	9,749	100.00	9,868	100.00
Registered voters/turnout			15,890	–
Source: President of Palau, Palau Embassy

=== Senate ===
Candidate	Votes	Notes
Stevenson Kuartei	7,050	Elected
Frank Kyota	6,561	Elected
Mason Whipps	6,409	Elected
Aric Nakamura	6,337	Elected
Mark Rudimch	5,805	Elected
Hokkons Baules	5,200	Elected
Phillip Reklai	5,168	Elected
Uduch Sengebau Senior	4,997	Elected
Elias Camsek Chin	4,744	Elected
Rukebai Inabo	4,680	Elected
Regis Akitaya	4,647	Elected
Kerai Mariur	4,533	Elected
John B. Skebong	4,450	Elected
Alan T. Marbou	4,285	
Faustina K. Rehuher-Marugg	3,917	
Alan R. Seid	3,749	
Steven Kanai	3,643	
Seit Andres	3,343	
Satoru W. Adachi	3,277	
Santy Asanuma	3,237	
Surech Bells Hideyos	2,480	
Joan Risong Tarkong	2,469	
Rebecca Sebalt Ngirmechaet	2,364	
Gregorio Ngirmang	2,185	
Source: Palau Embassy

=== House of Delegates ===
State	Candidate	Votes	Notes
Aimeliik	Marino O. Ngemaes	472	Elected unopposed
Airai	Vicky Kanai	604	Elected unopposed
Angaur	Mario S. Gulibert	173	Elected unopposed
Hatohobei	Sebastian R. Marino	65	Elected
Hatohobei	Wayne Andrew	55	
Kayangel	Noah Kemesong	230	Elected unopposed
Koror	Mengkur W. Rechelulk	1,284	Elected
Koror	Alexander Merep	1,104	
Melekeok	Lentcer Basilius	301	Elected
Melekeok	Kevin Mesebeluu	161	
Ngaraard	Gibson Kanai	498	Elected
Ngaraard	Dwight G. Alexander	230	
Ngarchelong	Dilmai Saiske	316	Elected
Ngarchelong	Lily Ulitech	203	
Ngarchelong	Masao Salvador	156	
Ngardmau	Lucio Ngiraiwet	143	Elected
Ngardmau	Fermin R. Meriang	134	
Ngaremlengui	Swenny Ongidobel	239	Elected
Ngaremlengui	Portia Klong Franz	215	
Ngatpang	Lee T. Otobed	234	Elected unopposed
Ngchesar	Sabino Anastacio	292	Elected unopposed
Ngiwal	Masasinge Arurang	149	Elected
Ngiwal	Jeff R. Ngirarsaol	107	
Ngiwal	Francis Llecholch	80	
Ngiwal	Eugene Termeteet	74	
Ngiwal	Krispin Termeteet	65	
Peleliu	Jonathan Isechal	300	Elected
Peleliu	Joseph Mtoched Giramur	224	
Sonsorol	Yutaka Gibbons Jr.	107	Elected
Sonsorol	Celestine T. Yangilmau	68	
Source: Palau Embassy
