= 2020 Palauan general election =

- 3 November 2020
- Presidential election
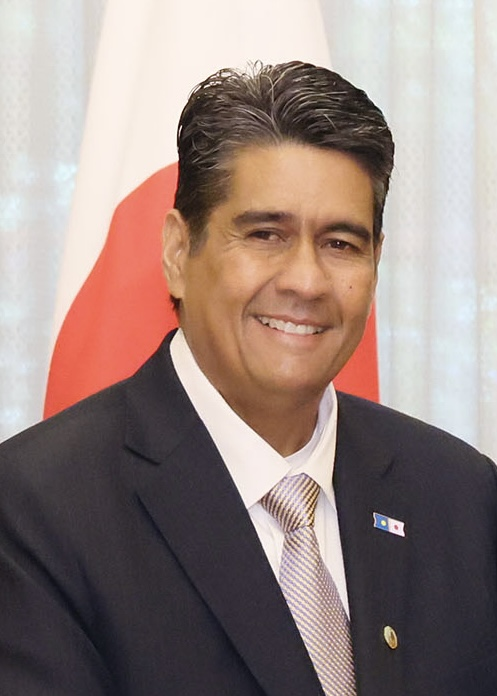

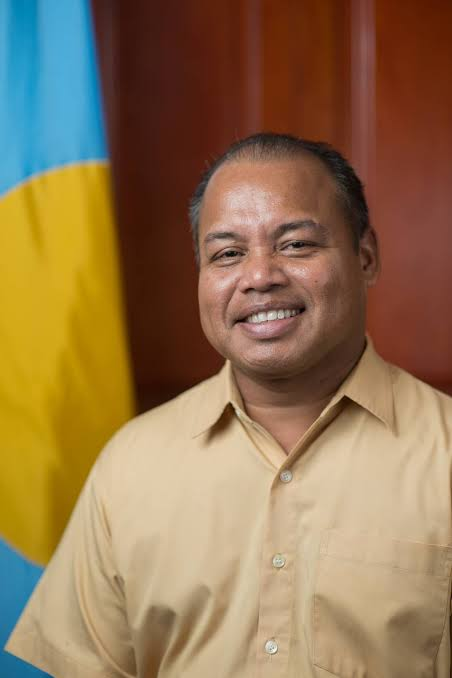
Nominee	Surangel Whipps Jr.	Raynold Oilouch
Party	Independent	Independent
Popular vote	5,699	4,351
Percentage	56.71%	43.29%
- Vice Presidential election
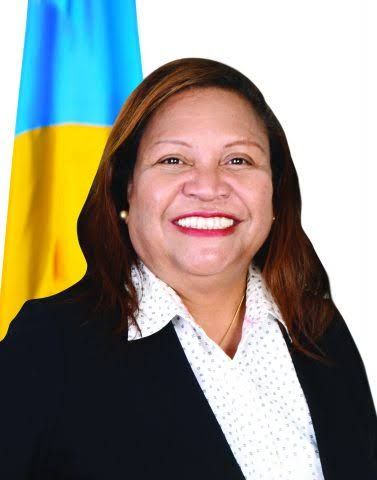

Nominee	Uduch Sengebau Senior	Frank Kyota
Party	Independent	Independent
Popular vote	5,112	4,671
Percentage	52.25%	47.75%
President before election
Tommy Remengesau
Independent
President after election
Surangel Whipps Jr.
Independent

General elections were held in Palau on 3 November 2020 to elect a President and the National Congress.

== Electoral system ==
The President of Palau is elected using the two-round system.

The 13 members of the Senate are elected from a single nationwide constituency by block voting, with each voter having 13 votes to cast. The 16 members of the House of Delegates are elected in single-member constituencies based on the states using first-past-the-post voting.

== Results ==
=== President ===
The primary round was held on 22 September 2020 with four candidates. The incumbent president, Thomas Remengesau Jr., was ineligible to stand again having reached his term limit. Former presidential candidate (and brother-in-law of the incumbent) Surangel Whipps Jr. took first place in the primary, while Vice President Raynold Oilouch placed second to qualify for the second round of the presidential election.

Following the second round on 3 November, Oilouch conceded defeat to Whipps on 5 November after all the votes from Palau had been counted, giving Whipps a 1,202 vote lead with around 2,000 absentee votes still to be counted. The Palau Election Commission officially certified the final results on 17 November.

Candidate	Primary		General	
Candidate	Votes	%	Votes	%
Surangel Whipps Jr.	3,546	46.30	5,699	56.71
Raynold Oilouch	1,984	25.91	4,351	43.29
Johnson Toribiong	1,145	14.95		
Alan R. Seid	983	12.84		
Total	7,658	100.00	10,050	100.00
Valid votes	7,658	98.76	10,050	98.49
Invalid/blank votes	96	1.24	154	1.51
Total votes	7,754	100.00	10,204	100.00
Registered voters/turnout	16,420	47.22	16,754	60.90
Source: MBJ, MV, Island Times

=== Vice president ===
Candidate	Votes	%
Uduch Sengebau Senior	5,112	52.25
Frank Kyota	4,671	47.75
Total	9,783	100.00
Valid votes	9,783	95.87
Invalid/blank votes	421	4.13
Total votes	10,204	100.00
Registered voters/turnout	16,754	60.90
Source: Island Times

=== Senate ===
Candidate	Votes	Notes
Mason Whipps	7,099	Elected
Stevenson Kuartei	6,965	Elected
Andrew Tabelual	6,696	Elected
Mark Rudimch	5,684	Elected
Rukebai Inabo	5,652	Elected
Hokkons Baules	5,594	Elected
K. Topps Sungino	5,496	Elected
TJ Imrur Remengesau	5,475	Elected
Umiich Sengebau	5,468	Elected
Jonathan Isechal	5,384	Elected
Kerai Mariur	5,278	Elected
Secilil Eldebechel	4,792	Elected
Regis Akitaya	4,715	Elected
Aric Nakamura	4,547	
Phillip Reklai	4,184	
Salvador Tellames	4,082	
Rebluud Kesolei	4,006	
Joann Risong Tarkong	3,678	
Elias Camsek Chin	3,584	
Seit Andres	2,586	
Alexander Merep	2,333	
John Skebong	2,123	
Eugene Termeteet	2,089	
Moses Y. Uludong	1,553	
Francis Llecholch	1,139	
John Mengidab	1,088	
Blodak Quichocho	692	
Ismael Remoket Muchucheu	333	
Source: Psephos

=== House of Delegates ===
State	Candidate	Votes	Notes
Aimeliik	Warren Umetaro	—	Elected unopposed
Airai	Vicky Kanai	—	Elected unopposed
Angaur	Mario Gulibert	214	Elected
Angaur	Olkeriil Kazuo	144	
Hatohobei	Sebastian Marino	—	Elected unopposed
Kayangel	Noah Kemesong	264	Elected
Kayangel	Midas Ngiracheluolu	114	
Koror	Mengkur W. Rechelulk	—	Elected unopposed
Melekeok	Frutoso Toto Tellei	335	Elected
Melekeok	Lentcer Basilius	311	
Ngaraard	Gibson Kanai	614	Elected
Ngaraard	Jerome Esebei Temengil	231	
Ngarchelong	Timothy Sinsak	522	Elected
Ngarchelong	Dilmai Saiske	388	
Ngardmau	Lucio Ngiraiwet	157	Elected
Ngardmau	Fermin Meriang	151	
Ngaremlengui	Swenny Ongidobel	296	Elected
Ngaremlengui	Portia Franz	227	
Ngatpang	Lee Otobed	212	Elected
Ngatpang	Jersey Iyar	197	
Ngchesar	Sabino Anastacio	270	Elected
Ngchesar	Rebecca Sebalt Ngirmechaet	156	
Ngiwal	Masasinge Arurang	237	Elected
Ngiwal	Ellender Ngirameketii	230	
Peleliu	Nace Soalablai	284	Elected
Peleliu	Joseph Mtoched Giramur	233	
Sonsorol	Yutaka Gibbons Jr	—	Elected unopposed
Source: Psephos
