= 2024 Palauan general election =

- 5 November 2024
- Presidential election
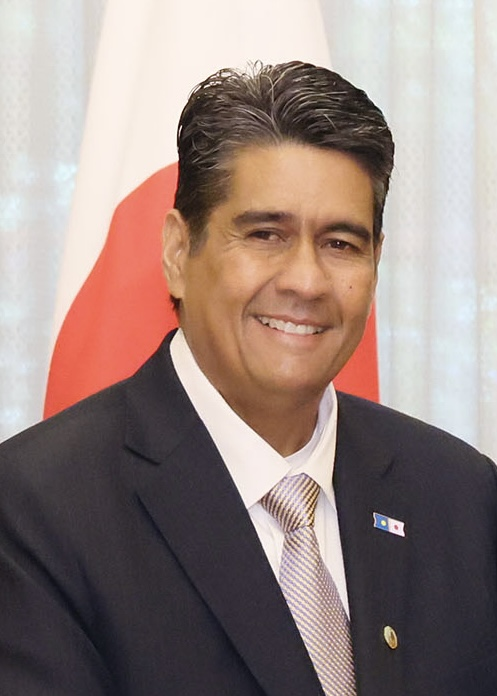

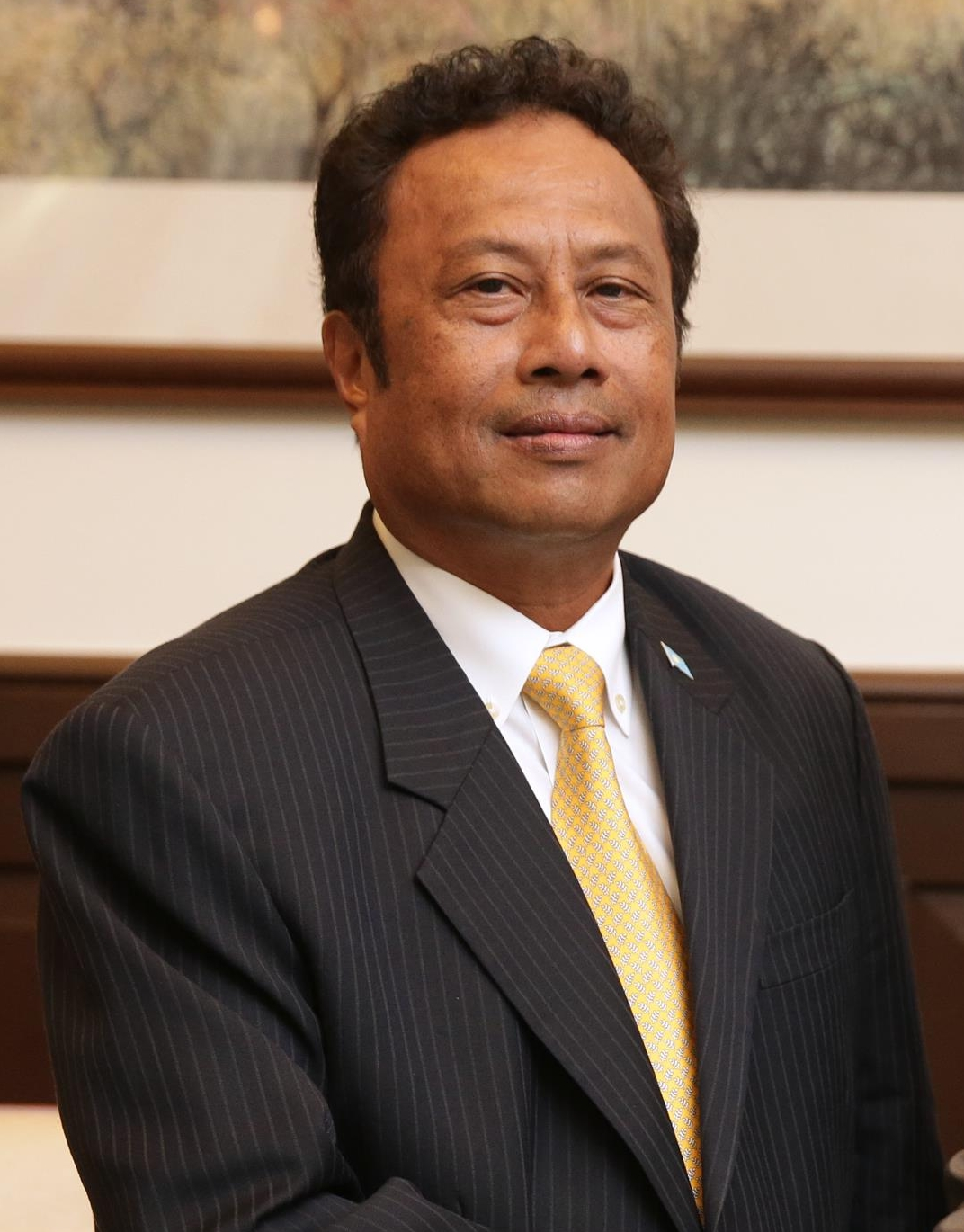
Nominee	Surangel Whipps Jr.	Thomas Remengesau Jr.
Party	Independent	Independent
Popular vote	5,626	4,103
Percentage	57.74%	42.11%
President before election
Surangel Whipps Jr.
Independent
President after election
Surangel Whipps Jr.
Independent
- Vice Presidential election
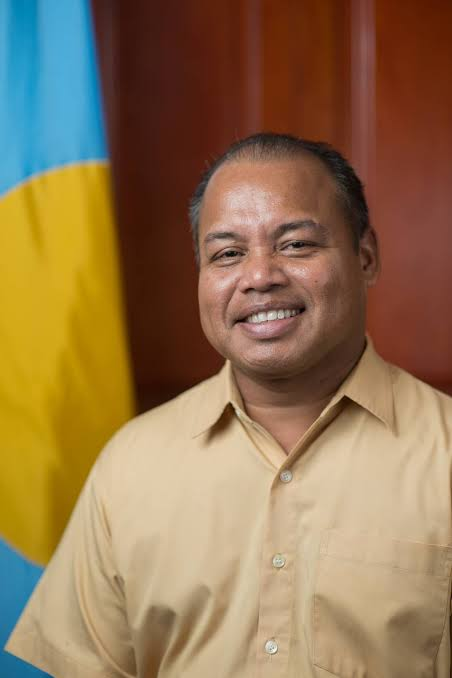

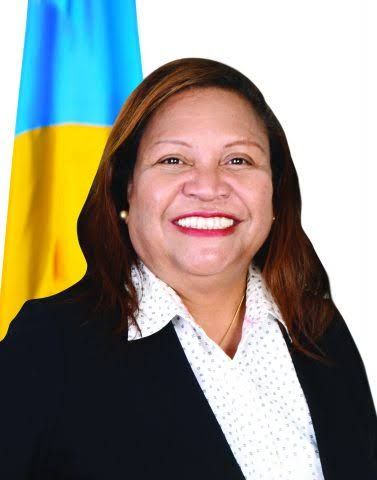
Nominee	Raynold Oilouch	Uduch Sengebau Senior
Party	Independent	Independent
Popular vote	6,726	2,829
Percentage	70.25%	29.55%
Vice President before election
Uduch Sengebau Senior
Vice President after election
Raynold Oilouch
Independent

General elections were held in Palau on 5 November 2024 to elect a President and the National Congress. Incumbent President Surangel Whipps Jr. faced former president Tommy Remengesau Jr. in the election, and was reelected. This was the first presidential election where Remengesau lost.

== Electoral system ==
The president was elected using the two-round system.

The 15 members of the Senate were elected from a single nationwide constituency by block voting, with each voter having 15 votes to cast. The 16 members of the House of Delegates were elected in single-member constituencies based on the states using first-past-the-post voting.

== Candidates ==
=== For President ===
==== Declared ====
Candidate	Experience	Home state	Campaign	Ref.
Candidate	Experience	Home state	Date announced	Ref.
Surangel Whipps Jr. (born 1968, age 56)	President (since 2021); Other offices: Senator (2009–2016)	Ngatpang	Palauan People First	
Surangel Whipps Jr. (born 1968, age 56)	President (since 2021); Other offices: Senator (2009–2016)	Ngatpang	11 February 2024	
Thomas Remengesau Jr. (born 1956, age 68)	President (2001–2009, 2013–2021); Other offices: Vice President (1993–2001); Minister of Administration (1993–2001)	Koror	Together, we can make tomorrow Better	
Thomas Remengesau Jr. (born 1956, age 68)	President (2001–2009, 2013–2021); Other offices: Vice President (1993–2001); Minister of Administration (1993–2001)	Koror	24 February 2024	

=== For Vice President ===
Candidate	Experience	Home state	Campaign	Ref.
Candidate	Experience	Home state	Date announced	Ref.
Uduch Sengebau Senior (born 1965, age 59)	Vice President (since 2021); Other offices: Minister of Justice (since 2021); Minister of Justice (2021); Senator (2013–2021)	Koror	Palau Family First	
Uduch Sengebau Senior (born 1965, age 59)	Vice President (since 2021); Other offices: Minister of Justice (since 2021); Minister of Justice (2021); Senator (2013–2021)	Koror	6 February 2024	
Raynold Oilouch (born 1965, age 59)	Vice President (2017–2021); Other offices: Minister of Justice (2017–2021); Senator (2009–2017)	Ngchesar	Moving Forward Together	
Raynold Oilouch (born 1965, age 59)	Vice President (2017–2021); Other offices: Minister of Justice (2017–2021); Senator (2009–2017)	Ngchesar	27 May 2024	

== Campaign ==
Campaigning was marred by diplomatic and economic issues. Tommy Remengesau Jr criticized growing security relations with the United States under Whipps' presidency, which the latter has supported as a "deterrent". Remengesau also pledged to revoke a 15% tax on goods introduced by Whipps.

== Results ==
Preliminary results appeared to show Surangel Whipps Jr. leading in the presidential race, while Raynold Oilouch was leading as vice president. Whipps formally claimed victory on 11 November, while Remengesau conceded defeat earlier.

=== President ===
Candidate	Votes	%
Surangel Whipps Jr.	5,626	57.74
Thomas Remengesau Jr.	4,103	42.11
Write-in	15	0.15
Total	9,744	100.00
Valid votes	9,744	99.16
Invalid/blank votes	83	0.84
Total votes	9,827	100.00
Registered voters/turnout	16,916	58.09
Source: Palau Election Commission

=== Vice president ===
Candidate	Votes	%
Raynold Oilouch	6,726	70.25
Uduch Sengebau Senior	2,829	29.55
Write-in	20	0.21
Total	9,575	100.00
Valid votes	9,575	97.44
Invalid/blank votes	252	2.56
Total votes	9,827	100.00
Registered voters/turnout	16,916	58.09
Source: Palau Election Commission

=== Senate ===
Candidate	Votes	Notes
Stevenson Kuartei	5,224	Elected
Mason Ngirchechebangel Whipps	5,019	Elected
Andrew Tabelual	4,742	Elected
Mark U. Rudimch	4,621	Elected
Brian Melairei	4,088	Elected
Kazuki L. "Topps" Sungino	4,070	Elected
Siegfried Bai Nakamura	4,053	Elected
Secilil Eldebechel	4,048	Elected
Ann Latii Pedro	4,039	Elected
TJ Imrur Remengesau	4,003	Elected
Salvador Sadoi Tellames	3,929	Elected
Lentcer Basilius	3,884	Elected
Rukebai Inabo	3,787	Elected
Lee T. Otobed	3,704	Elected
Hokkons Baules	3,657	Elected
Kerai Mariur	3,593	
Joann Risong Tarkong	3,052	
Umiich Sengebau	3,009	
Ann Kloulechad Singeo	2,947	
Blodak S. Quichocho	2,852	
Vierra Joel Toribiong	2,784	
Sandra Sumang Pierantozzi	2,558	
Jeff Ngirarsaol	2,519	
Dilmei L. Olkeriil	1,773	
Moses Y. Uludong	1,665	
Ismael Remoket	309	
Write-in	695	
Source: Palau Election Commission

=== House of Delegates ===
State	Candidate	Votes	Notes
Aimeliik	Warren S. Umetaro	271	Elected
Aimeliik	Write-in	4	
Airai	Stephanie Ngirchoimei	299	Elected
Airai	Ralph F. Kanai	129	
Airai	Johana Ngiruchelbad	129	
Airai	Williander Ngotel	85	
Airai	Reagan Sidoi	85	
Airai	Write-in	3	
Angaur	Mario S. Gulibert	111	Elected
Angaur	Kennosuke A. Suzuky	61	
Angaur	Write-in	2	
Hatohobei	Sebastian R. Marino	36	Elected
Hatohobei	Write-in	24	
Kayangel	Noah Kemesong	137	Elected
Kayangel	Wayland Dulei Keizi	75	
Koror	Mengkur W. Rechelulk	1,301	Elected
Koror	Joseph "Joe" Aitaro	1,180	
Koror	Write-in	4	
Melekeok	Silverius Ouch Tellei	216	Elected
Melekeok	Frutoso "Toto" Tellei	138	
Melekeok	Write-in	1	
Ngaraard	Gibson Kanai	280	Elected
Ngaraard	Wilbert Ngirakamerang	209	
Ngaraard	Write-in	1	
Ngarchelong	Timothy R. Sinsak	387	Elected
Ngarchelong	Write-in	65	
Ngardmau	Blesoch Aderkeroi	84	Elected
Ngardmau	Fermin R. Meriang	81	
Ngardmau	Dodger Kumangai	71	
Ngardmau	Write-in	1	
Ngaremlengui	Portia Franz Kesolei	180	Elected
Ngaremlengui	Swenny Ongidobel	124	
Ngatpang	Francesca Ruluked Otong	133	Elected
Ngatpang	John Techitong	105	
Ngchesar	Rebecca Sebalt Ngirmechaet	137	Elected
Ngchesar	Sabino Anastacio	133	
Ngiwal	Ellender Ngirameketii	140	Elected
Ngiwal	Masasinge Arurang	117	
Ngiwal	Elmis Mesubed Bechab	50	
Ngiwal	Eugene "Usin" Termeteet	40	
Peleliu	Nace N. Soalablai	264	Elected
Peleliu	Serelina Bota Ridep	133	
Peleliu	Write-in	2	
Sonsorol	Yutaka Gibbons Jr.	118	Elected
Sonsorol	Write-in	4	
Source: Palau Election Commission

== Aftermath ==
Taiwanese president Lai Ching-te sent congratulations to Whipps and his vice president, Raynold Oilouch, upon their reelection and election respectively.
