= 2004 Palauan general election =

- 2 November 2004
- Presidential election
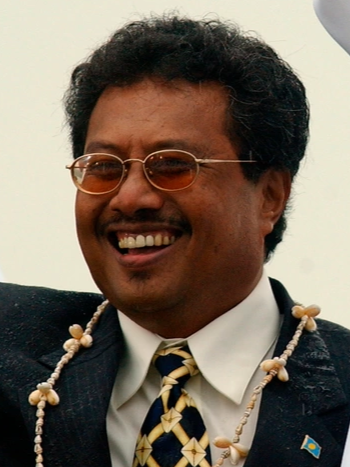

Candidate	Tommy Remengesau	Polycarp Basilius
Party	Independent	Independent
Popular vote	6,260	3,180
Percentage	66.31%	33.69%
President before election
Tommy Remengesau
Independent
Elected President
Tommy Remengesau
Independent

General elections were held in Palau on 2 November 2004, alongside several referendums. The presidential election was won comfortably by the incumbent, Tommy Remengesau, who took almost two-thirds of the vote, whilst all House of Delegates and Senate seats were won by non-partisan independents.

== Results ==
=== President ===
Candidate	Votes	%
Tommy Remengesau	6,260	66.31
Polycarp Basilius	3,180	33.69
Total	9,440	100.00
Valid votes	9,440	97.68
Invalid/blank votes	224	2.32
Total votes	9,664	100.00
Registered voters/turnout	12,922	74.79
Source: IFES

=== Vice president ===
Candidate	Votes	%
Elias Camsek Chin	3,819	70.83
Sandra Pierantozzi	1,573	29.17
Total	5,392	100.00
Source: Psephos

=== Senate ===
Candidate	Votes	Notes
Surangel Whipps Jr.	4,024	Elected
Alan R. Seid	3,986	Elected
Mlib Tmetuchl	3,474	Elected
Yukiwo P. Dengokl	2,977	Elected
Joshua Koshiba	2,894	Elected
Santy Asanuma	2,770	Elected
Johnny Reklai	2,743	Elected
Alfonso Diaz	2,703	Elected
Caleb T. O. Otto	2,533	Elected
Seit Andres	2,376	
Paul Ueki	2,236	
Lucius Malsol	2,216	
Harry Rubasech Fritz	1,810	
Carlos Salii	1,803	
Imelda Bai Nakamura	1,572	
Steven Kanai	1,495	
Dilmei Olkeriil	1,384	
Emiliano Kazuma	653	
Miriam Timarong	530	
Edobo Temengil	528	
Gillian Etumai Johanes	399	
Margarita Borja	285	
Source: Psephos

=== House of Delegates ===
State	Candidate	Votes	Notes
Aimeliik	Kalistus Ngirturong	375	Elected unopposed
Airai	Noah Secharraimus	447	Elected
Airai	Charles Obichang	422	
Angaur	Mario S. Gulibert	207	Elected
Angaur	Victorio Uherbelau	95	
Hatohobei	Thomas Patris	54	Elected
Hatohobei	Nemecio Andrew	45	
Kayangel	Florencio Yamada	114	Elected
Kayangel	Masayuki Adelbai	91	
Kayangel	Evence Beches	57	
Koror	Joel Toribiong	1,370	Elected
Koror	Roman Yano	876	
Koror	Sam Masang	873	
Melekeok	Augustine Mesebeluu	187	Elected
Melekeok	Henaro Antonio	107	
Melekeok	Kazuo Asanuma	92	
Ngaraard	Antonio Bells	442	Elected
Ngaraard	Tadashi Sakuma	344	
Ngarchelong	Kerai Mariur	485	Elected
Ngarchelong	Yusim Sato	172	
Ngardmau	Lucio Ngiraiwet	138	Elected
Ngardmau	Rebluud Kesolei	132	
Ngaremlengui	William Ngaraikelau	242	Elected
Ngaremlengui	Swenny Ongidobel	95	
Ngaremlengui	Akino Mekoll	82	
Ngatpang	Okada Techitong	127	Elected unopposed
Ngchesar	Sabino Anastacio	232	Elected
Ngchesar	Moses Uludong	174	
Ngiwal	Noah Idechong	241	Elected
Ngiwal	Elia Tulop	237	
Peleliu	Jonathan Isechal	352	Elected
Peleliu	Gerdence Ide Meyar	277	
Sonsorol	Flavian Carlos	90	Elected unopposed
Source: Psephos
