= Women in Palau =

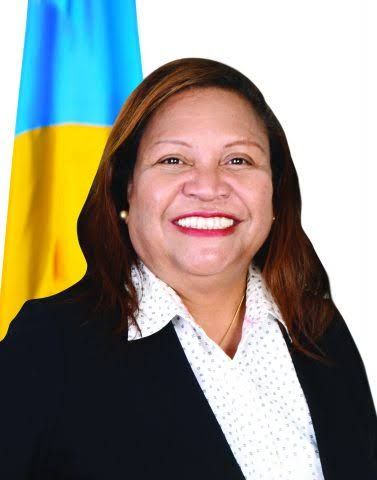
Uduch Sengebau Senior, current Vice President of Palau

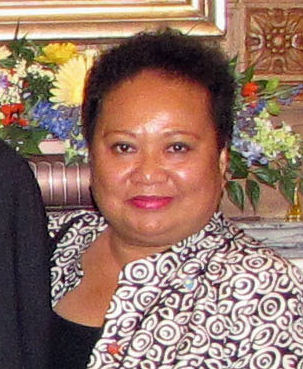
Sandra Pierantozzi, former Vice President of Palau

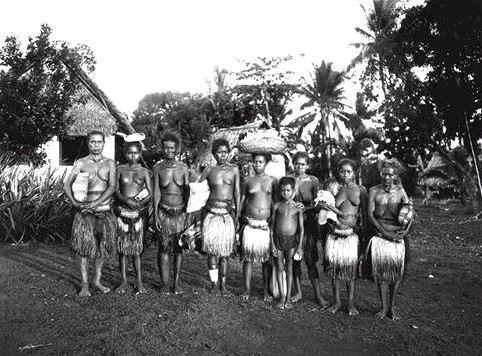
A portrait of a group of women in Palau and a boy, 1915.

Women in Palau, known also as Palauan women, Belauan women, Pelew (archaic English) women, or Women of Los Palaos Islands (Spanish influenced name) are women who live in or are from Palau. Historically, there was a strong "gendered division of labor" between women and men of Palau.

== Historical context ==
To women belonged activities like farming and collection of shellfish (men were in charge of house construction and community building). Present-day women - among Palauan men - are participants to wage labor. Although women now occupy jobs as physicians, lawyers and business managers. In relation to the history of national politics of Palau, Sandra Pierantozzi became the Vice President of Palau, and served as Palau's Minister of State.

Traditionally, a Senior Palauan woman can become a part of the village council leadership, who has powers to select and remove male titleholders. They have decision-making authority in terms of matriline-controlled property and wealth (money are received by women on behalf of clans).

== Food production ==
Starch foods, known as ongraol are produced by women who work the taro swamps in the villages. Food beliefs include preparing special foods for pregnant and lactating Palauan women.

== Social stratification symbols ==
As a sign of personal achievement, women in Palau may wear necklaces that are made up of Palauan money pieces.

== Dance ==
The usual form of dance Palauan women perform include traditional dance that are "stately and performed by two lines of women".

== Notable women ==
- Theodosia Faustino Blailes, first female governor and author
- Akiko Sugiyama, politician
- Rukebai Inabo, politician
- Vicky Kanai, politician
- Katharine Kesolei, anthropologist and politician
- Siobhon McManus, activist
- Regina Mesebeluu, politician
- Maria Gates-Meltel, politician
- Sha Merirei, artist and activist
- Cita Morei, activist
- Gabriela Ngirmang, activist
- Ulai Otobed, physician
- Sandra Pierantozzi, politician
- Faustina K. Rehuher-Marugg, politician
- Leilani Reklai, politician
- Olympia E. Morei-Remengesau, curator
- Ernestine Rengiil, lawyer and tennis player
- Dilmai Saiske, politician
- Gloria Salii, chief
- Uduch Sengebau Senior, politician
- Baklai Temengil, politician
- Ngedikes Olai Uludong, diplomat
- Valerie Whipps, First Lady of Palau
