= 2008 Palauan referendum =

A twenty-three-part referendum was held in Palau on 4 November 2008 alongside the country's general elections. Voters were asked questions on requirements of citizenship to hold office, government provision of primary school and health care, the definition of marriage and term limits for Parliament. Only the proposal permitting naturalization for certain adoptees failed to obtain the requisite majority of the vote and majority in 3/4th of the states.

== Results ==
=== No dual citizenship for President ===
A popular initiative proposed amending the constitution to prohibit dual citizens from being eligible to hold the office of President or Vice President. It would amend Article VIII, Section 3 of the Constitution to read:

Any citizen of Palau who is not a citizen of another country and who is not less than thirty-five (35) years of age and who has been a resident of Palau for the five (5) years immediately, preceding the election shall be eligible to hold the office of President or Vice President.

Choice	Votes	%
For	7,614	78.73
Against	2,057	21.27
Invalid/blank votes	-	–
Total	9,671	100
Registered voters/turnout	14,196	68.12
Source: Direct Democracy

=== Separate election of President and Vice President ===
A popular initiative proposed amending the constitution to permit the President and Vice President to be elected separately. It was meant to undo joint election, which was passed by referendum in 2004. It would amend Article VIII, Section 4 of the Constitution to read:

The President and Vice President shall be elected in a nationwide election for a term of four years. ~~The President and Vice President shall be chosen jointly by the casting by each vote of a single vote applicable to both officers.~~ A person may not serve as a President for more than two consecutive terms.

Choice	Votes	%
For	6,477	67.26
Against	3,152	32.74
Invalid/blank votes	-	–
Total	9,629	100
Registered voters/turnout	14,196	67.83
Source: Direct Democracy

=== Definition of the inauguration of President and Vice President ===
A popular initiative proposed amending the constitution to specifically define the end date of a presidential and vice presidential term and the inauguration of a new one. It would add a new paragraph to Article VIII, Section 4 of the Constitution which read:

The terms of the incumbent President and Vice President shall end at the time of the installation of the President and Vice President-elect Which shall take place on the third Monday of January after the general election, at eleven o'clock am

Choice	Votes	%
For	7,727	82.51
Against	1,637	17.49
Invalid/blank votes	-	–
Total	9,364	100
Registered voters/turnout	14,196	65.96
Source: Direct Democracy

=== Right to trial by jury for serious crimes ===
A popular initiative proposed amending the constitution to require a trial by jury for serious crimes. It would add a new section to Article IV of the Constitution which would read:

Section 14: The Olbiil Era Kelulau may provide for a trial by jury in criminal and civil cases, as prescribed by law, provided, however, that where a criminal offense is to have been committed after December 31, 2009, and where search criminal offense is punishable by a sentence of imprisonment of twelve (12) months or more, the accused shall have the right to a trial by a jury, as prescribed by law.

Choice	Votes	%
For	5,480	58.74
Against	3,848	41.26
Invalid/blank votes	-	–
Total	9,328	100
Registered voters/turnout	14,196	65.71
Source: Direct Democracy

=== No dual citizens as members of Parliament ===
A popular initiative proposed amending the constitution to prevent dual citizens from being elected to Parliament. It would amend Article IX, Section 6 of the Constitution to read as follows:

To be eligible to hold office in the Olbiil Era Kelulau, a person must be:

a citizen of Palau only; not less than twenty-five (25) years of age; a resident of Palau for not less than five (5) years immediately, preceding the election, and

a resident of the district in which he wishes to run for office for not less than one (1) year immediately, preceding the election.

Choice	Votes	%
For	7,376	80.84
Against	1,748	19.16
Invalid/blank votes	-	–
Total	9,124	100
Registered voters/turnout	14,196	64.27
Source: Direct Democracy

=== Limits on compensation for members of Parliament ===
A popular initiative proposed amending the constitution to limit the compensation paid to members of Parliament. It would amend Article IX, Section 8 of the Constitution to read as follows:

The compensation of the members of the Eighth Olbiil Era Kelulau shall be a ~~uniform fee~~ the initial amount of salary Which shall be determined by law, but shall not exceed the amount of compensation received by the members of the Seventh Olbiil Era Kelulau, ~~for each day the member attends to official session of the Olbiil Era Kelulau. The amount of the fee shall be determined by law.~~ No increase in compensation shall apply to the members of the Olbiil Era Kelulau during the term of enactment, nor to increase in compensation may be enacted in the period between the date of a regular general election and the date a new era Olbiil Kelulau takes office.

Choice	Votes	%
For	7,373	78.66
Against	2,000	21.34
Invalid/blank votes	-	–
Total	9,373	100
Registered voters/turnout	14,196	66.03
Source: Direct Democracy

=== Beginning and end of a legislative term ===
A popular initiative proposed amending the constitution to define the beginning and end of a legislative term. It would amend Article IX, Section 11 of the Constitution to read as follows:

The terms of the incumbent members of the Olbiil Era Kelulau shall end at the time of the installation of the members-elect, Which shall take place on the third Monday of January after the general election. Each house of the Olbiil Era Kelulau shall convene its meeting on the fourth ~~second~~ Tuesday in January following the regular general election and may meet regularly for four (4) years. Either house may be convened at any time by the presiding officer, or at the written request of the Majority of the members, or by the President.

Choice	Votes	%
For	7,727	82.79
Against	1,606	17.21
Invalid/blank votes	-	–
Total	9,333	100
Registered voters/turnout	14,196	65.74
Source: Direct Democracy

=== No term limit for members of Parliament ===
A popular initiative proposed amending the constitution to repeal the parliamentary term limits amendment passed in 2004. It read as follows:

The Amendment of the Constitution "limiting terms of members of the Olbiil Era Kelulau" is hereby repealed.

Choice	Votes	%
For	5,610	59.98
Against	3,743	40.02
Invalid/blank votes	-	–
Total	9,353	100
Registered voters/turnout	14,196	65.88
Source: Direct Democracy

=== Separation of Appellate Division of the Supreme Court ===
A popular initiative proposed amending the constitution to separate the Appellate Division of the Supreme Court from the Trial Division. It would amend Article X Section 2 to read as follows:

The Supreme Court is a court of record, Consisting of an appellate division and a trial division. The Supreme Court shall be composed of a Chief Justice and not less than three (3) ~~nor more than (6)~~ Associate Justices, all of whom shall be members of both divisions, provided, however when the Olbiil Era Kelulau appropriates funds for additional justices to serve on the appellate division, the Chief Justice shall implement the separation of the Justices of the appellate division and provide rules and reputations therefore. All appeals shall be heard by at least three justices. Matters before the trial division may be heard by one justice. No justice may hear or decide an appeal of a matter heard by him in the trial division.

Choice	Votes	%
For	7,095	76.43
Against	2,188	23.57
Invalid/blank votes	-	–
Total	9,283	100
Registered voters/turnout	14,196	65.39
Source: Direct Democracy

=== Constitutional voting anytime ===
A popular initiative proposed amending the constitution to permit amendment of the constitution by referendum at any time, where referendums had previously been limited to taking place during general elections. It would amend Article XIV, Section 2 to read as follows:

Section 2: After the Election Commission certifies that a proposed amendment has satisfied the requirement of this Article, a nationwide election shall be held on the proposed amendment as prescribed by law, provided that no such election shall be held either six (6) months before or six (6) months after a general election. Section ~~2~~ 3. ~~A~~ Once a proposed amendment ~~to this Constitution shall become effective when~~ is approved ~~at the next regular general~~ in a nationwide election by a Majority of the votes cast on that amendment and in not less than three-fourth (3/4) of the states, The amendment shall take effect on the date prescribed in the text of the amendment itself, or if a date is not prescribed then on the date the election results are certified.

Choice	Votes	%
For	7,285	79.63
Against	1,863	20.37
Invalid/blank votes	-	–
Total	9,148	100
Registered voters/turnout	14,196	64.44
Source: Direct Democracy

=== Academic freedom at all levels ===
A popular initiative proposed amending the constitution to ensure a right to academic freedom in all institutions of higher learning. It would add a new section to Article IV to read as follows:

Section 15: In post-secondary education and any institution of higher learning, academic freedom is guaranteed.

Choice	Votes	%
For	7,505	80.42
Against	1,827	19.58
Invalid/blank votes	-	–
Total	9,332	100
Registered voters/turnout	14,196	65.74
Source: Direct Democracy

=== Dual citizenship with all possible states ===
A popular initiative proposed amending the constitution to ensure a right to academic freedom in all institutions of higher learning. It would amend the constitutional section on "Allowing Palauans Multiple Citizenship" to read as follows::

A person born of parents, one or both of whom are or are citizens of Palau of recognized Palauan ancestry, is a citizen of Palau, ~~by birth . United States~~ Citizenship of other foreign nations shall not affect a person's Palauan citizenship, ~~nor shall a person of recognized Palauan ancestry be required to renounce United States citizenship to become a naturalized citizen of Palau. Persons of recognized Palauan ancestry who are citizens of other foreign nations may retain their Palauan citizenship or become naturalized Palauan citizens as provided by law. Palauan citizens may renounce their Palauan citizenship. Renouncements made prior to the effective date of this amendment are not affected by this amendment.~~ Section 2 Repealer. Article III, Sections 2 and 3 are hereby repealed.

Choice	Votes	%
For	7,001	74.72
Against	2,368	25.28
Invalid/blank votes	-	–
Total	9,369	100
Registered voters/turnout	14,196	66.00
Source: Direct Democracy

=== Naturalization for adoptees ===
A popular initiative proposed amending the constitution to permit adoptees to petition the government for naturalization. It would amend Article III, Section 4 to read as follows:

A person born of parents who are not ~~born of parents, one or both of whom are~~ of recognized Palauan ancestry and who is adopted before the age of three (3) by parents (s), one or both of whom are citizens of Palau, shall have the right to enter and reside in Palauan to enjoy other rights and privileges as provided by the law, Which shall include the right to petition through a special act of the Olbiil Era Kelulau to become a naturalized citizen of Palau: ~~provided that prior to becoming a naturalized citizen, a person must not renounce his citizenship of another nation.~~ There shall be no citizenship by naturalization except pursuit to this section.

Choice	Votes	%
For	4,156	44.66
Against	5,149	55.34
Invalid/blank votes	-	–
Total	9,305	100
Registered voters/turnout	14,196	65.54
Source: Direct Democracy

This was the only proposal among the package of twenty-three which failed.

=== Postal voting for citizens overseas ===
A popular initiative proposed amending the constitution to permit overseas Palauans to vote by absentee ballot. It would amend Article VII to read as follows:

A citizen of Palau eighteen (18) years of age or older may vote in national and state elections. The Olbiil Era Kelulau shall prescribe a minimum period of residence for voter registration and provide for national elections. Each state shall prescribe a minimum period of residence and provide for voter registration for state elections. A citizen who is in prison, serving a sentence for a felony, or mentally incompetent as determined by a court may not vote. Voting shall only be by absentee ballot for voters who are outside the territory of Palau during an election.

Choice	Votes	%
For	7373	78.98
Against	1,962	21.02
Invalid/blank votes	-	–
Total	9,335	100
Registered voters/turnout	14,196	65.76
Source: Direct Democracy

=== Land acquisition for diplomatic purposes ===
A popular initiative proposed amending the constitution to permit foreign countries to acquire land for diplomatic purposes. It would amend Article XIII, Section 8 to read as follows:

Only citizens of Palau and corporations wholly owned by citizens of Palau may acquire title to land or waters in Palau. Foreign countries, with which Palau establishes diplomatic relations, may acquire title to land for Diplomatic purposes Pursuant to bilateral treaties or agreements.

Choice	Votes	%
For	5,736	61.31
Against	3,619	38.69
Invalid/blank votes	-	–
Total	9,355	100
Registered voters/turnout	14,196	65.90
Source: Direct Democracy

=== Land acquisition for non-Palauans limited to 99 years ===
A popular initiative proposed amending the constitution to limit land ownership by non-Palauans to 99 years. It would amend Article XIII, Section 8 to read as follows:

Only citizens of Palau and corporations wholly owned by citizens of Palau may acquire title to land or waters in Palau. While non-citizens may not acquire title to land, Palauan citizens may lease land in Palau to non-citizens or corporations not wholly owned by citizens for up to 99 years.

Choice	Votes	%
For	5,726	61.21
Against	3,628	38.79
Invalid/blank votes	-	–
Total	9,354	100
Registered voters/turnout	14,196	65.89
Source: Direct Democracy

=== Support for Palauan culture ===
A popular initiative proposed amending the constitution to require the government to support Palauan traditional culture. It would amend Article V, adding a new paragraph which read as follows:

Section 3: The national government shall take affirmative action to assist traditional leaders in the preservation, protection, and promotion of Palauan heritage, culture, languages, customs, and traditions.

Choice	Votes	%
For	7,542	81.28
Against	1,736	18.72
Invalid/blank votes	-	–
Total	9,278	100
Registered voters/turnout	14,196	65.36
Source: Direct Democracy

=== Marriage as between a man and a woman only ===
Voters were asked whether they approved of a popular initiative to amend the constitution defining marriage as between a man and a woman. Article IV, Section 13 of the Constitution would be amended to read as follows:

The government shall provide for marital and related parental rights, privileges and responsibilities on the basis of equality between men and women, mutual consent and cooperation. All marriages contracted within the Republic of Palau shall be between a man and a woman. Parents or individuals acting in the capacity of parents shall be legally responsible for the support of and for the unlawful conduct of their minor children as prescribed by law.

Choice	Votes	%
For	7,896	83.55
Against	1,554	16.45
Invalid/blank votes	-	–
Total	9,450	100
Registered voters/turnout	14,196	66.57
Source: Direct Democracy

=== Free primary school ===
A popular initiative proposed amending the constitution to require the government to provide free education for grades one through twelve. It would amend Article VI to read as follows:

The national government shall take positive action to attain these national objectives and implement these national policies: conservation of a beautiful, healthful and resourceful natural environment: promotion of the national economy: protection of the safety and security of persons and property: promotion of the health and social welfare of the citizens through the commission of free or subsidized health care: and commission of public education for citizens Which shall be free from grades one (1) to twelve (12) and compulsory as prescribed by law.

Choice	Votes	%
For	8,026	85.94
Against	1,312	14.06
Invalid/blank votes	-	–
Total	9,338	100
Registered voters/turnout	14,196	65.78
Source: Direct Democracy

=== Free preventive health care ===
A popular initiative proposed amending the constitution to require the government to provide free health care. It would add a new section to Article IV to read as follows:

Section 16: The national government shall provide free preventive health care for every citizen as prescribed law.

Choice	Votes	%
For	8,042	86.47
Against	1,258	13.53
Invalid/blank votes	-	–
Total	9,300	100
Registered voters/turnout	14,196	65.51
Source: Direct Democracy

=== Priority of Palauan before the English language in the Constitution ===
Voters were asked whether they approved of a popular initiative to amend the constitution to give the Palauan version priority of interpretation over the English version. Article XIII, Section 2 of the Constitution would be amended to read as follows:

The Palauan and English versions of this Constitution shall be equally authoritative: in a case of conflict, the ~~English~~ Palauan version shall prevail.

Choice	Votes	%
For	7,352	78.84
Against	1,973	21.26
Invalid/blank votes	-	–
Total	9,325	100
Registered voters/turnout	14,196	65.69
Source: Direct Democracy

=== Definition of territorial waters ===
A popular initiative proposed amending the constitution to define the nation's territorial waters. It would amend Article I, Sections 1 and 2 to read as follows:

Section 1: (A) The Republic of Palau shall have jurisdiction and sovereignty over its territory Which consist of all the islands, atoll reefs, and shoals that have traditionally been in ~~of~~ the Palauan archipelago Ngeruangel Kayangel including reef and Island in the north and Hatohobei Island (Island Tobi) and Hocharihie (Helen's reef) in the south and all rural areas adjacent and in between, and therefore, consist of the internal waters and archipelagic waters within these rural areas, the territorial waters around these rural areas, and the air space above these lands and water areas, extending to a two hundred (200) nautical miles exclusive economic zone, unless otherwise delimited by bilateral agreement or as may be limited or extended under international law, ~~from a straight archipelagic baseline, the seabed, subsoil, water column insular shelves, and airspace over land and water unless limited by international treaty obligations assemble by Palau.~~

(B) the straight archipelagic baselines, Which from the breadths of marine zones are measured for Palauan Archipelago, Shall drawn from the northernmost point of Ngeruangel Reef, thence east to the northernmost point of Island and around the Kayangel Island to its easternmost point, south to the easternmost point of the Babeldaob Barrier Reef, south to the easternmost point of Anguar Island and then around the Island to its westernmost point, thence north to the westernmost point of Ngeruangel Reef and then around the reef to the point of origin. The normal baselines, from Which the breaths of maritime zones for the South West islands are measured shall be drawn around the islands of Fanna, Sonsorol (Dongosaro), Pulo Anna and Merir, and the Island of Hatohobei (Tobi Island), including Hocharihic (Helen's Reef). ~~Helen's Reef, west from the southernmost point of Helen's Reef to the easternmost point of Tobi Iceland and then around the Iceland to its westernmost point, north to the westernmost point of Fanna Island, and north to the westernmost point of Ngeruangel Reef and then around the reef to the point of origin.~~ Section 2: (A) The Republic of Palau shall have exclusive ownership and shall exercise its sovereign rights to conserve, develop, exploit, explore, and manage at a sustainable manner all living and non-living resources within its exclusive economic zone and its continental shelf in accordance with applicable treaties, international law and practices. The Republic of Palau shall have exclusive ownership and sovereign jurisdiction over all mineral resources in the seabed, subsoil, water column and insular shelves within its continental self.

(B) Each state shall have exclusive ownership of all living and non-living resources except highly migratory fish ~~from the country to~~ within the twelve (12) nautical mile territorial sea: ~~seaward through the traditional baselines:~~ provided, however, that traditional fishing rights and practices shall not be impaired.

Choice	Votes	%
For	7,331	81.33
Against	1,682	18.67
Invalid/blank votes	-	–
Total	9,013	100
Registered voters/turnout	14,196	63.49
Source: Direct Democracy

=== Judicial Appointments Commission only Palauan citizens ===
A popular initiative proposed amending the constitution to require all members of the Judicial Nominating Commission to be citizens of Palau. It would amend Article 7 Chapter X to read as follows:

The Judicial Nominating Commission shall consist of seven (7) members, all of whom shall be citizens of the Republic of Palau, as defined by Article III of the Constitution of the Republic of Palau. The Chief Justice of the Supreme Court shall be one of the seven (7) members and shall act as chairman. ~~one of whom shall be the Chief Justice of the Supreme Court who shall act as a chairman.~~ The Bar Association shall elect three (3) of its citizen-members to serve on the Judicial Nominating Commission and the President shall appoint three (3) citizens who are not members of the bar The Judicial Nominating Commission shall meet upon the call of the Chairman and prepare and submit to the President a list of seven ( 7) nominees for the positions of justice and judge. A new list shall be submitted every year.

Choice	Votes	%
For	6,947	77.78
Against	1,984	22.22
Invalid/blank votes	-	–
Total	8,931	100
Registered voters/turnout	14,196	62.91
Source: Direct Democracy
