= Remengesau =

Remengesau is a surname. Notable people with the surname include:

- Thomas Remengesau, Sr. (1929–2019), Palauan politician
- Tommy Remengesau (born 1956), Palauan politician
- Valerie Whipps (née Remengesau), Palauan First Lady
- TJ Imrur Remengesau, Palauan politician
