= Tmetuchl =

Tmetuchl may refer to:

- Mlib Tmetuchl, Palauan businessman and politician
- Roman Tmetuchl, Palauan political leader and businessman
