= Landisang Kotaro =

Chief of Staff of Palau since 2021

Landisang Kotaro is the current chief of staff of Palau. She is the youngest person and first woman to hold the position. She was chosen for the position in 2021 by President Surangel Whipps Jr.

== Education and personal life ==
Kotaro attended the University of Utah, enrolling in 2005. She had been drawn to the university because her older sister was also attending, and because her mother was doing research in the university's Department of Psychology. She graduated with her bachelor's degree in 2009. She then returned to Palau. Kotaro later attended graduate school in Taiwan, at National Chengchi University, where she obtained a master's degree in Asia-Pacific Studies. She received a scholarship from the Palau National Scholarship Board to pursue her studies in Taiwan.

== Career ==
After graduating from the University of Utah, Kotaro worked for the Senate of Palau for a year. She has since worked in the House of Delegates.

Kotaro was Secretariat coordinator of President Surangel Whipps Jr.'s transition committee in 2020.

In June 2022, Kotaro was selected for the Obama Foundation Leaders Asia-Pacific Program. On November 17, 2022, Kotaro shared a stage with Barack Obama at the Obama Foundation Democracy Forum 2022.
