= Speaker of the House of Delegates =

Speaker of the House of Delegates may refer to:

- List of speakers of the Maryland House of Delegates
- House of Delegates of Palau#Speaker of the House of Delegates
- List of speakers of the Virginia House of Delegates
- List of speakers of the West Virginia House of Delegates
