= Palau Congressional Library =

Library in Palau

The Palau Congressional Library was founded on August 18, 1981, and is housed at the Palau National Congress in Koror. As of 1996, it was headed by Congressional Librarian Harry Besebes. It has a 5,000 item collection, with annual additions of 350. The library employs 2 staff members, both professional librarians.

The collection highlights legislation passed by the Congress, journals of sessions deliberation, committee reports on legislation, and directories.

In the facility, Congressional Clerks index Palau's parliamentary papers, and Legal Counsel staff perform their analysis and research. Members, parliamentary staff, and the public are all permitted to use the facilities.

The facilities were prompted by the Constitutional Government, newly installed on January 1, 1981.

According to a paper by Besebes on the library, prepared for the 62nd IFLA Conference, "The Congress Library is organized as one of the Joint Programs under the President of the Senate and the Speaker of the House of Delegates. All reports and other matters pertaining to the Congress Library have to be approved by the President of the Senate and the Speaker of the House of Delegates."

It is not a member of the International Federation of Library Associations and Institutions.
