= 2004 Palauan constitutional referendum =

A six-part referendum was held in Palau on 2 November 2004 alongside the country's general elections. Voters were asked questions on summoning a Constitutional Convention, payment of members of the National Congress, creating a unicameral Congress, term limits for Congress members, election of the President and Vice President and dual citizenship. All proposals were approved except the unicameral Congress, which despite receiving a majority of the public vote, did not meet the quorum of 12 of 16 states required for amendments to the constitution.

== Results ==
=== Convening of a constitutional convention ===
Shall there be a Convention to revise or amend the Constitution?

Choice	Votes	%
For	5,085	57.60
Against	3,742	42.40
Invalid/blank votes	810	–
Total	9,637	100
Registered voters/turnout	13,191	73.05
Source: Direct Democracy

=== Congressional attendance ===
Voters were asked whether they approved of a popular initiative to amend the constitution regarding the payment of members of the National Congress. The proposed amendment of article IX, section 8 would have read:

The compensation of the members of the Olbiil Era Kelulau shall be uniform fee for each day the member attends an official session of the Olbiil Era Kelulau. The amount of the fee shall be determined by law. No increase in compensation shall apply to the members of the Olbiil Era Kelulau during the term of enactment, nor may an increase in compensation be enacted in the period between the date of a regular general election and the date a new Olbiil Era Kelulau takes office."

Choice	Votes	%	States
For	6'466	74.33	15
Against	2'598	28.67	15
Invalid/blank votes		-	–
Total	9,064	100	16
Registered voters/turnout	13,191		–
Source: Direct Democracy

=== Unicameral parliament ===
Choice	Votes	%	States
For	5,086	55.99	11
Against	3,997	44.01	5
Invalid/blank votes		-	–
Total	9,083	100	16
Registered voters/turnout	13,191		–
Source: Direct Democracy

=== Three-term limit for National Congress members ===
A popular initiative proposed amending the constitution to limit the number of terms a member of the National Congress could serve to three. The text would read:

No person shall serve as a member of the Olbiil Era Kelulau for more than three terms; provided however, that any person elected as a member of the Olbiil Era Kelulau in the regular general election in which this amendment is adopted shall be entitle to serve the four-year for which he or she was elected regardless of the number of previous terms served.

Choice	Votes	%	States
For	5,601	60.43	13
Against	3,667	39.57	3
Invalid/blank votes		-	–
Total	9,268	100	16
Registered voters/turnout	13,191		–
Source: Direct Democracy

=== Joint election of the president and vice president ===
A popular initiative proposed amending the constitution to elect the president and vice president together rather than separately. It would amend Article VIII, section 4 of the constitution to read:

The President and Vice President shall be elected in a nationwide election for a term of four (4) years. The President and Vice President shall be chosen jointly by the casting by each voter of A single vote applicable to both offices. A person may not serve as President for more than two consecutive terms.

Choice	Votes	%	States
For	5,334	58.42	14
Against	3,795	41.58	2
Invalid/blank votes		-	–
Total	9,129	100	16
Registered voters/turnout	13,191		–
Source: Direct Democracy

=== Dual citizenship ===
A popular initiative proposed amending the constitution to allow Palauan citizens to hold dual citizenship, and give citizenship at birth to people with Palauan parents. The proposed wording was:

A person born of parent, one or both of whom are of recognized Palauan ancestry, is a citizenship shall not affect a person's Palauan citizenship, nor shall a person of recognized Palauan ancestry be required to renounce United States citizenship to become a naturalized citizen of Palau. Persons of other foreign nations may retain their Palauan citizenship or become naturalized Palauan citizens as provided by law. Palauan citizen may renounce their Palauan citizenship. Renouncements made prior to the effective date of this amendment are not affected by this amendment.

Choice	Votes	%	States
For	5,791	62.59	16
Against	3,460	37.41	0
Invalid/blank votes		-	–
Total	9,251	100	16
Registered voters/turnout	13,191		–
Source: Direct Democracy
