= Palau National Congress =

Legislature of Palau

Palau National Congress Olbiil era Kelulau
- 12th Olbiil Era Kelulau
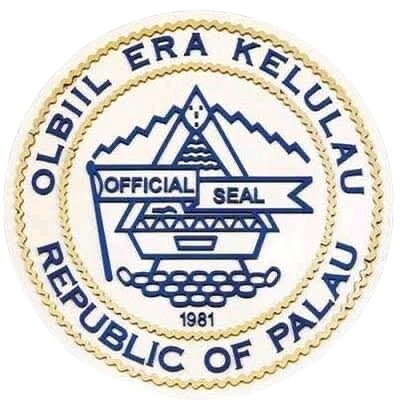
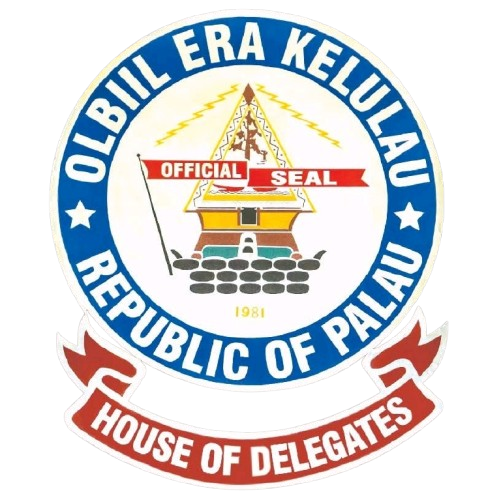
- Seals of the Senate (left) and of the House of Delegates (right)

Type
- Type: Bicameral
- Houses: Senate; House of Delegates

History
- Founded: First Government Est. 1955 Gained Independence on 1 October 1994

Leadership
- President of the Senate: Hokkons Baules
- Speaker of the House: Mario Gulibert
- Chief of Staff: Landisang Kotaro

Structure
- Seats: 31 members (15 and 16)
- Senate political groups: Nonpartisan: 15 seats
- House of Delegates political groups: Nonpartisan: 16 seats

Elections
- Senate voting system: single-seat constituency
- House of Delegates voting system: multi-seat constituency
- Last Senate election: 5 November 2024
- Last House of Delegates election: 5 November 2024

Meeting place
- Olbiil era Kelulau building in the capitol complex, Ngerulmud

Palau has a bicameral legislature, the Palau National Congress (Palauan: Olbiil era Kelulau), consisting of the House of Delegates and the Senate of Palau, which both sit at the capitol complex in Ngerulmud, Melekeok State. The House of Delegates has 16 members, each serving four-year terms in single-seat constituencies. Since January 2025, the Senate has 15 members, also serving four-year terms in multi-seat constituencies. In every elections held, only non-partisans are elected; no political parties exist.

The congress is called Olbiil Era Kelulau (OEK) in Palauan or “House of Whispered Decisions". When it was founded, there were 18 senators. That number of them was changed in 1984 to 14. The number of senators changed again in 2000, when it was reduced drastically to 9. In 2008, it was raised once again, to 13. Since January 2025, the Senate has 15 members.

In 2026, the Senate President was Hokkons Baules and the House of Delegates speaker was Mario Gulibert.

== List of elections ==
- 1980 Palauan general election
- 1984 Palauan general election
- 1988 Palauan general election
- 1992 Palauan general election
- 1996 Palauan general election
- 2000 Palauan general election
- 2004 Palauan general election
- 2008 Palauan general election
- 2012 Palauan general election
- 2016 Palauan general election
- 2020 Palauan general election
- 2024 Palauan general election

== Palau Congressional Library ==
Housed at the Palau National Congress, the Palau Congressional Library was founded on August 18, 1981. Headed as of 1996 by Congressional Librarian Harry Besebes, it has a 3000 item collection, with annual accessions of 350. The library employs 2 staff members, both professional librarians.

== See also ==
- Politics of Palau
- Congress of the Trust Territory of the Pacific Islands
- List of legislatures by country
