= Vice President of Palau =

Deputy head of state and government of Palau

Vice President of the Republic of Palau
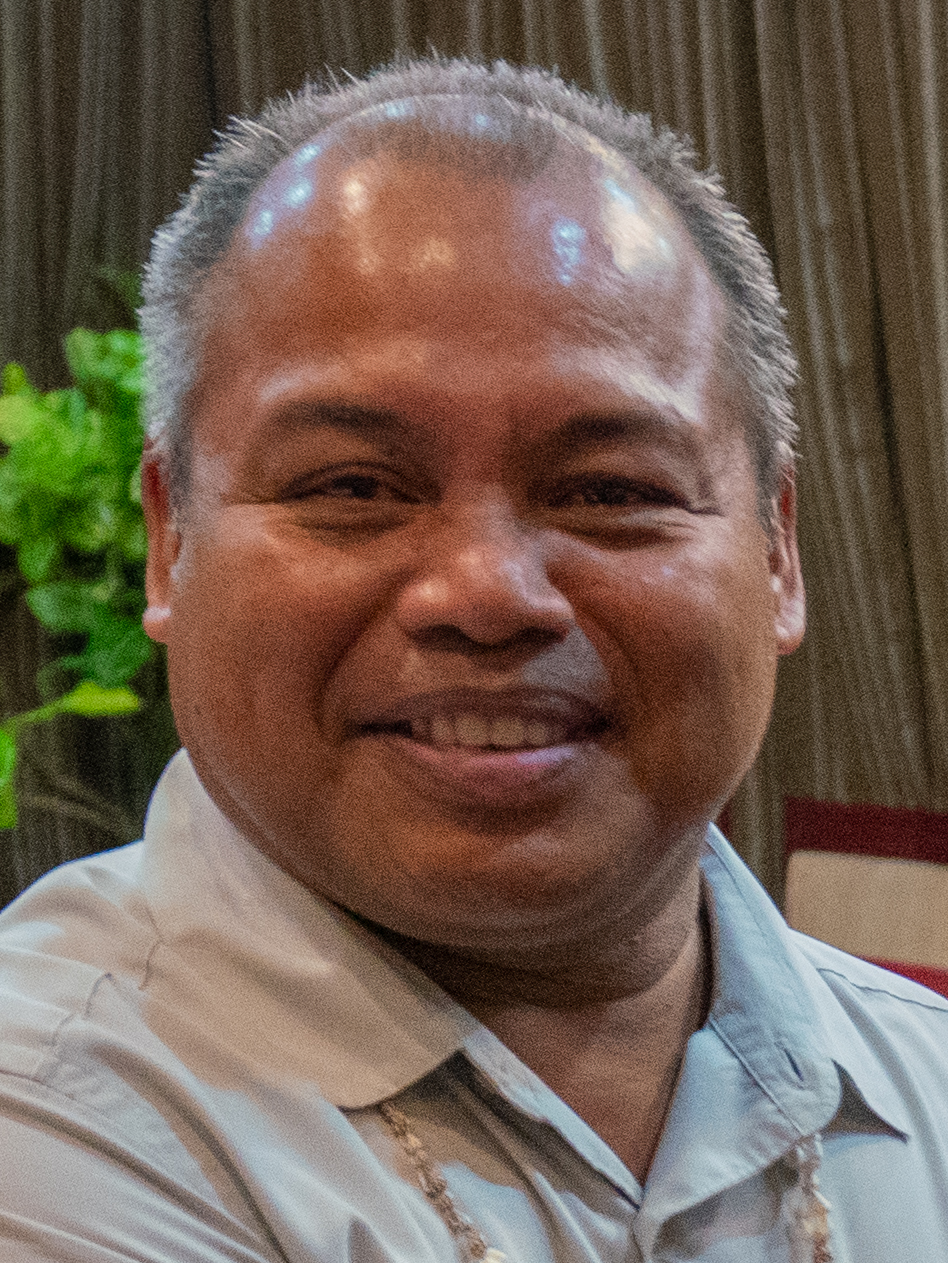
- Incumbent; Raynold Oilouch since 16 January 2025
- Term length: Four years, renewable once
- Inaugural holder: Alfonso Oiterong
- Formation: 2 March 1981
- Salary: US$65,000 annually since 2010
- Website: http://palaugov.pw/

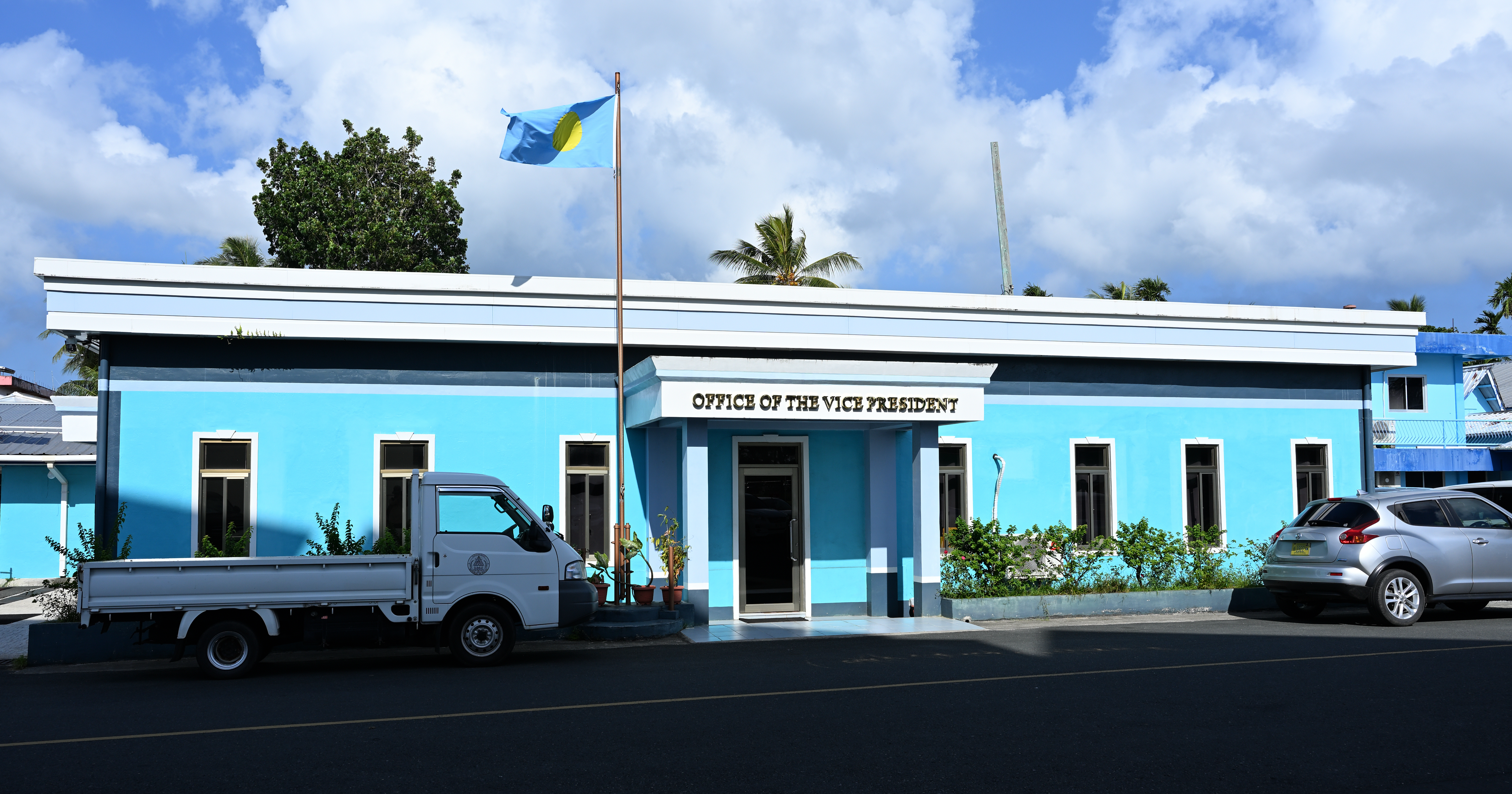
Office of the Vice President in Koror

Vice President of Palau is the second-highest position in the executive branch of the government of Palau, after the president.

The vice president is elected in popular elections separate from presidential elections. When the president has been sworn in, the vice president will serve as a member of the cabinet and may have other responsibilities assigned by the president. The salary of the vice president has been US$65,000 annually since 2010

== List of vice presidents ==
| No. | Portrait | Name (Birth–Death) | Elected | Term of office | | | Political party |
| No. | Portrait | Name (Birth–Death) | Elected | Took office | Left office | Time in office | Political party |
|---|---|---|---|---|---|---|---|
| 1 | | Alfonso Oiterong (1924–1994) | 1980; 1984 | 2 March 1981 | 30 June 1985 (Became president) | 4 years, 120 days | Independent |
| 2 | | Thomas Remengesau Sr. (1929–2019) | 1985 | 25 October 1985 | 20 August 1988 | 2 years, 300 days | Independent |
| 3 | | Kuniwo Nakamura (1943–2020) | 1988 | 1 January 1989 | 1 January 1993 | 4 years | Independent |
| 4 | | Thomas Remengesau Jr. (born 1956) | 1992; 1996 | 1 January 1993 | 19 January 2001 | 8 years, 18 days | Independent |
| 5 | | Sandra Pierantozzi (born 1951) | 2000 | 19 January 2001 | 1 January 2005 | 3 years, 348 days | Independent |
| 6 | | Elias Camsek Chin (born 1948) | 2004 | 1 January 2005 | 15 January 2009 | 4 years, 14 days | Independent |
| 7 | | Kerai Mariur (born 1951) | 2008 | 15 January 2009 | 17 January 2013 | 4 years, 2 days | Independent |
| 8 | | Antonio Bells (born 1948) | 2012 | 17 January 2013 | 19 January 2017 | 4 years, 2 days | Independent |
| 9 | | Raynold Oilouch (born 1965 or 1966) | 2016 | 19 January 2017 | 21 January 2021 | 4 years, 2 days | Independent |
| 10 | | Uduch Sengebau Senior (born 1960s) | 2020 | 21 January 2021 | 16 January 2025 | 3 years, 361 days | Independent |
| 11 | | Raynold Oilouch (born 1965 or 1966) | 2024 | 16 January 2025 | Incumbent | 1 year, 235 days | Independent |

== See also ==
- President of Palau
- List of current vice presidents
