= Capitol of Palau =

Government building in Ngerulmud, Palau

- A view of the Capitol of Palau. The flag of Palau can be seen at the top of its dome.
- Interactive map of the Capitol of Palau area

General information
- Architectural style: Neoclassicism
- Location: Ngerulmud, Palau
- Coordinates: 7.5002°N 134.6243°E
- Construction started: 1999
- Completed: 2006
- Client: Republic of Palau

Technical details
- Floor area: ?

Design and construction
- Architect: Joseph Farrell

Website
- Government of Palau website

The Capitol of Palau is the palace of the Palau National Congress. It is located in Ngerulmud, the administrative capital of the country. Its design is based on the United States Capitol.

== History ==
The building's architect is Joseph Farrell of Hawaii. Planning began in 1986, and construction lasted from 1999 to 2006.

== Details ==
View of the architectural complex of the Palau Capitol Palace

The complex has three wings:

- Legislative Building (Central Wing) housing the Palau National Congress
- Executive Building (West Wing) housing the Government of Palau (President and cabinet)
- Judicial building (East Wing) housing the Supreme Court of Palau's Appellate Division.
National Capitol Complex of Palau
Executive Building

Judiciary Building

Olbiil Era Kelulau building
