= Umiich Sengebau =

Palauan politician

Member of the Senate of Palau
- Incumbent
- Assumed office January 2021

Minister of Natural Resources, Environment and Tourism
- In office February 2013 – 2021

Personal details
- Citizenship: Palauan
- Education: University of Hawaiʻi at Mānoa (BA); University of Guam (MS)

F. Umiich Sengebau is a Palauan politician who has served as a member of the Senate of Palau since 2021. He previously served as the Minister of Natural Resources, Environment and Tourism for eight years.

== Education ==
Sengebau earned his bachelor's degree in anthropology and Pacific Islands history from the University of Hawaiʻi at Mānoa and his master's degree in environmental science from the University of Guam.

== Career ==
Sengebau is a self-proclaimed "lifelong environmental advocate." He served on the Environmental Quality Protection Board from 2003 to 2009. Sengebau is also a member of the Palau Conservation Society Board of Directors and the Palau Protected Areas Network (PAN) Fund, and has served as deputy director of The Nature Conservancy, Micronesia programme.

In February 2013, Sengebau was appointed and confirmed as the Minister of Natural Resources, Environment and Tourism. He served in the position for eight years. On 25 November 2015, Sengebau was elected the inaugural chair of the Micronesian Association for Sustainable Aquaculture at the organization's first meeting, which was held in Koror.

Sengebau was elected to the Senate of Palau in the 2020 Palauan general election and took office in January 2021. He pledged to prioritize environmental issues, from supporting protected areas to helping farmers and fishermen through sustainable finance, as well as fighting the effects of climate change.
