= Ngedikes Olai Uludong =

Palauan diplomat

Ngedikes "Olai" Uludong is a Palauan diplomat, currently serving as the Permanent Representative from Palau to the United Nations and the Palau Ambassador to the European Union in the Kingdom of Belgium. Prior to her role as a diplomat, Uludong was Climate Change Advisor in environmental policy and management throughout the Micronesia and Pacific region. She is an active public servant that has coordinated environment and climate change work in the Republic of Palau, Republic of the Marshall Islands, Republic of Nauru, Republic of Maldives, the United Nations Framework Convention on Climate Change (UNFCCC) process, and served as the Lead Negotiator for the United Nations Negotiating Bloc: The Alliance of Small Islands States (AOSIS) in New York City as Palau's Ambassador to the European Union and Ambassador on Climate Change.

== Political career ==
Prior to Uludong's work in Climate Change, she served in the United States Army Reserve as a military policewoman in Guam between 1999 and 2003. After her service, she began her work in environmental policy, providing national environmental education and public awareness projects, oversaw the implementation of community projects and provided her expertise to the national congress and the Executive Branch of the Palau National Government .

From 2011 to 2013, Uludong became an adviser to the Republic of the Marshall Islands Environmental Protection Authority (RMIEPA) and oversaw the land and coast management division and all related environmental management issues that included mainstream climate change infrastructure development in RMI. Meanwhile, in 2012 to 2014, she was also an advisor for the Government of the Republic of Nauru and the Lead Negotiator/Senior Advisor for Climate Change of the Alliance of Small Island States in New York City.

In 2015, Uludong officially became Palau's Ambassador to the EU on Climate Change as well as Palau's Permanent Representative to the United Nations' Food and Agriculture Organization (FAO), serving as the Vice Chairperson of the Committee on Fisheries (COFI) bureau to FAO.

On February 10, 2017, Uludong was officially appointed as Palau's Ambassador to the United Nations, and she presented her credentials to Secretary-General of the United Nations António Guterres on March 21, 2017.

== Education ==
Uludong received a Bachelor of Science in Criminal Justice at the University of Guam in 2003, and her Post Graduate Diploma on Climate Change/M.Sc in Climate Change from the University of the South Pacific in Marshall Islands and Fiji after.
