= Maria Gates-Meltel =

Palauan politician and civil servant

Maria Gates-Meltel is a politician and civil servant in Palau who served as governor of Angaur state from 2011 to 2014.

== Biography ==
Maria Gates was born in Palau to Ngiraked Gates and Tongko Mekui-Gates. She married Jack Meltel, with whom she had three children, all sons, and multiple grandchildren.

After serving in the Angaur State Legislature, Gates-Meltel was elected as governor of Angaur state in 2011, defeating incumbent Governor Steven Salii and another candidate, Natus Misech. She served for two terms as governor, from January 2011 to December 2014. Her governorship has been described by researchers as "reflect[ing] the leading role women continue to play in Angaur society."

Since leaving office, she has worked as an administrative officer at the Palau Bureau of Foreign Affairs and Trade, and at the Ministry of State.

After leaving the governorship, accusations of cheating, violating the code of ethics, and misconduct in public office were brought against her after an investigation by the Office of the Public Auditor and the Office of the Special Prosecutor. The allegations pointed to a misuse of state assets or property for private purposes, specifically the use of $304.80 in Angaur state funds to purchase a round-trip plane ticket from San Francisco to Reno, Nevada, for non-official use. However, she maintained that "there are some people who are trying to frame me" and called the charges "political." In February 2020, she was found guilty on two counts, a felony count of misconduct in public office and a misdemeanor count of a code of ethics violation, and sentenced to a year of probation. She was also required to repay the $304.80 to Angaur state. All other charges against her were dismissed.
