= Vicky Kanai =

Palauan politician

Member of the House of Delegates of Palau
- Incumbent
- Assumed office 2016
- Constituency: Airai

Governor of Airai State
- In office 2006–2015

Speaker of the Airai State Legislature
- In office 2002–2006

Victoria Ngiratkakl-Kanai, known as Vicky Kanai, is a Palauan politician, who has been a member of the House of Delegates of Palau since 2016. Prior to her election, Kanai served as the governor of Airai for two terms.

Kanai ran unopposed in the 2020 Palauan general election.
