= Noah Idechong =

Palauan activist and politician

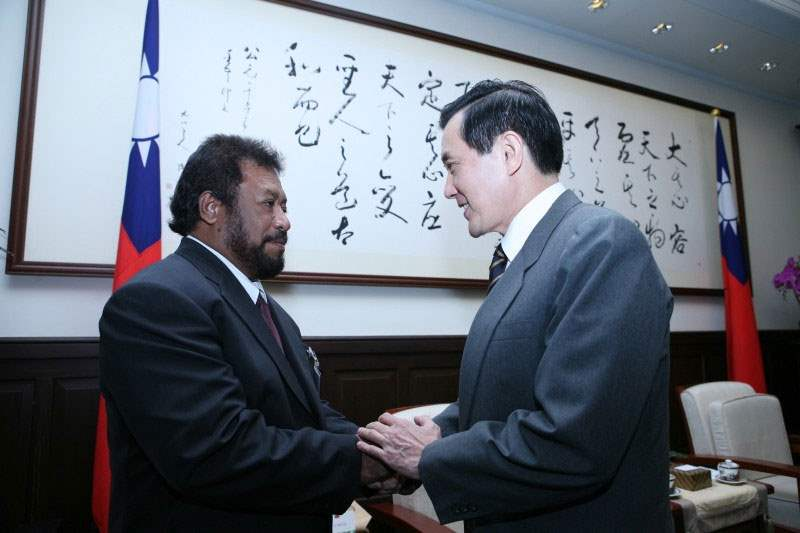
- Idechong (left) greets Ma Ying-jeou in 2009

Speaker of the House of Delegates of Palau
- In office 15 January 2009 – November 2012
- Preceded by: Antonio Bells
- Succeeded by: Sabino Anastacio

Personal details
- Born: Ngiwal, Republic of Palau
- Spouse: Teory S. Idechong
- Education: Hawaii Pacific College
- Occupation: Environmentalist, marine biologist, congressman, and fisherman

Noah Idechong is an environmental activist from Palau, and former chief of Palau's Governmental Division of Marine Resources, where he helped draft the county's first marine conservation legislation in 1997.

Having linked marine science, fisheries, and political reform in Palau, he was awarded the Goldman Environmental Prize in 1995 for his efforts in marine conservation. Idechong helped found the Palau Conservation Society, which spearheaded revivals in traditional conservation, now proven as effective management measures in the Micronesia region.

He later served as a member of the House of Delegates of Palau for the State of Ngiwal since the 2000 elections, helping to enact progressive, conservation-oriented public programs, such as the Protected Areas Network, the Micronesia Challenge, and the word's first Shark Sanctuary. He served as the speaker of the House of Delegates of Palau from 15 January 2009 to November 2012.

== Early life and education ==
He attended Palau High School and graduated from Pine City High School in Minnesota in 1971. He received a bachelors in Business Administration from Hawaii Pacific College in Honolulu in 1976.

== Awards ==
- Goldman Environmental Prize (1995)
- PEW Fellowship Award (1997)
- TIME Magazine, one of the Heroes for the Planet
