= Secilil Eldebechel =

Palauan politician

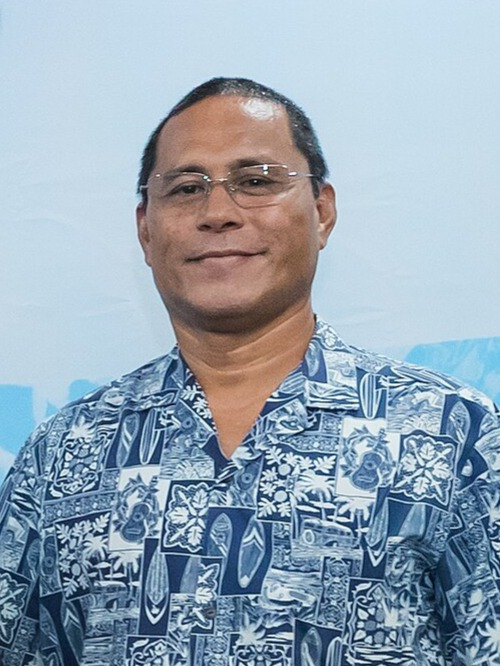

Member of the Senate of Palau
- Incumbent
- Assumed office 2021

Member of the House of Delegates of Palau from Ngchesar
- In office 2009–2017

Secilil Eldebechel is a Palauan politician, who has served as a delegate representing the State of Ngchesar in the House of Delegates of Palau. He was appointed as Minister of Finance of Palau in 2013, but was not confirmed by the Senate. He later became the Chief of Staff to The Administration of former President Thomas Remengesau Jr. for 8 years. He then went on to win his 2020 election to the 11th OEK Senate of Palau, where he serves as the Floor Leader.
