= TJ Imrur Remengesau =

Palauan politician

TJ Remengesau

Member of the Senate of Palau
- Incumbent
- Assumed office January 2021

TJ Imrur Remengesau is a Palauan politician. He was elected to the Senate of Palau in the 2020 Palauan general election.

== Career ==
He has been chairman of the Palau Conservation Society (PCS).

Remengesau worked in Washington, D.C., at the International Monetary Fund as an advisor for the Asia-Pacific.

== Personal life ==
He is the son of President Thomas Remengesau Jr.
