= Dilmai Saiske =

Palauan politician

Dilmai Saiske is a Palauan politician, who has been a member of the House of Delegates of Palau since 2016 for the state of Ngarchelong. Prior to her election, Saiske worked in education for 25 years; she had previously stood for office unsuccessfully.
