= Gibson Kanai =

Palauan politician

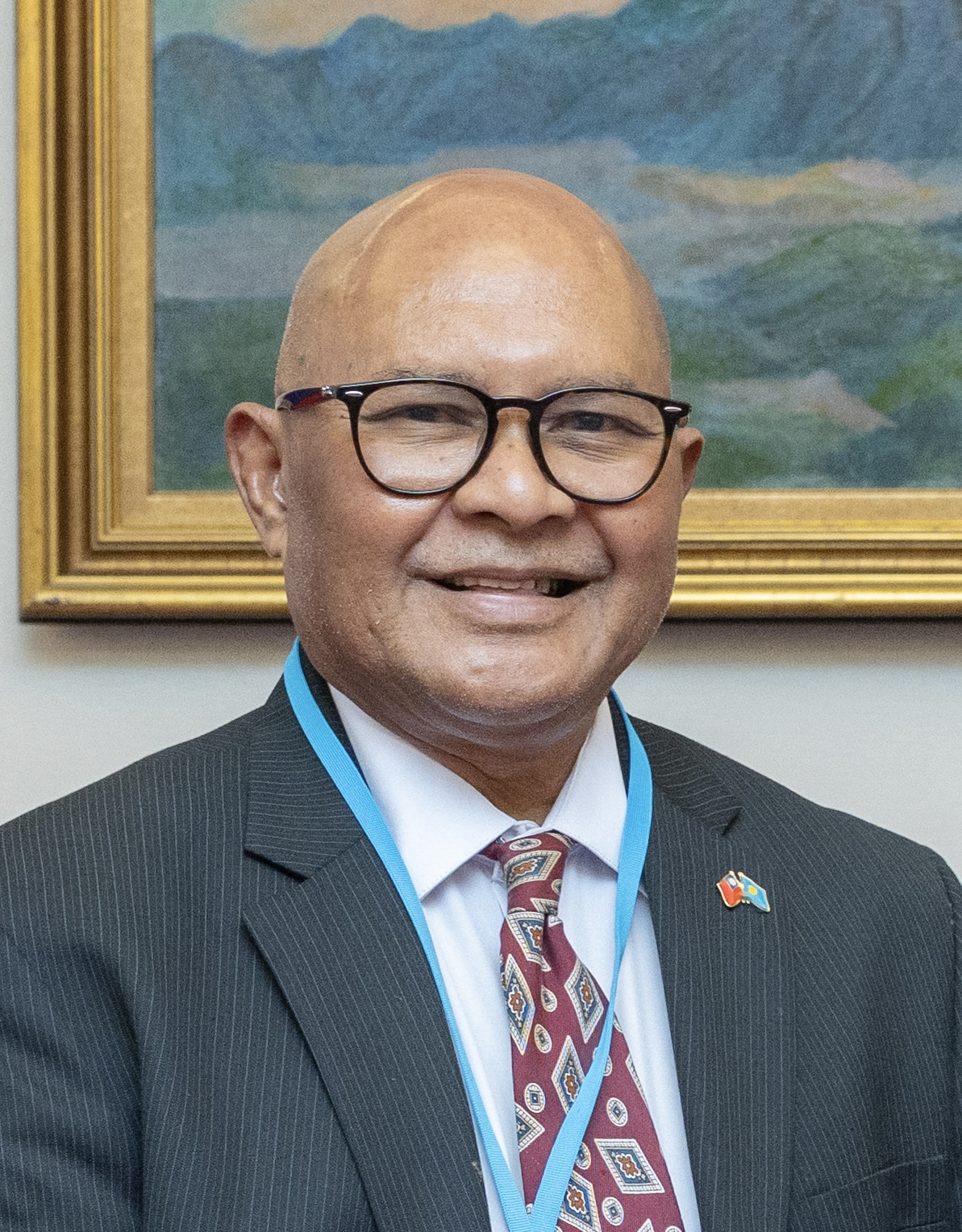

12th Speaker of the House of Delegates
- In office 16 January 2025 – 5 October 2026
- Vice Speaker: Mario S. Gulibert
- Preceded by: Sabino Anastacio
- Succeeded by: Mario S. Gulibert

Floor Leader of the House of Delegates of Palau
- In office 15 January 2009 – 16 January 2025
- Succeeded by: Warren Umetaro

Personal details
- Born: 31 December 1959 (age 66)
- Spouse: Elsie Uherbelau

Gibson Kanai (born 31 December 1959) is a Palauan politician who served as speaker of the House of Delegates of Palau from January 2025 to October 2026.

== Career ==
Kanai was born on 31 December 1959. He is from Ngaraard and served as Speaker of the Ngaraard State Legislature. He was elected to the House of Delegates of Palau in the 2008 Palauan general election and subsequently assumed the role of floor leader.

Kanai represented Palau in the Asian Parliamentary Assembly (APA) and served as one of the vice presidents of the organization. He also chaired the committee during the 2010 APA session in Palau.

He was reelected as a delegate in the 2024 Palauan general election and became the speaker of the House of Delegates of Palau. In July 2025, Kanai co-signed a letter with Senate President Hokkons Baules stating that the National Congress would not accept a United States proposal for Palau to host third country asylum seekers. He was ousted as the speaker on 5 October 2026.

== Personal life ==
He is married to Elsie Kanai (née Uherbelau).
