= Santy Asanuma =

Palauan politician

Postmaster General
- Incumbent
- Assumed office April 26, 2021
- President: Surangel Whipps Jr.

Personal details
- Born: Santy S. Asanuma; December 11, 1961 (age 64)
- Party: Independent
- Occupation: Politician

Santy S. Asanuma (born December 11, 1961) is a Palauan politician who has served as Postmaster General of Palau since 2021. He is also a member of the Senate of Palau.

Asanuma was born to Asanuma Asao, a businessman of Japanese-Palauan heritage, and his wife Sechedui, a member of Palau's Advisory Council.
