= Antonio Bells =

Palauan politician

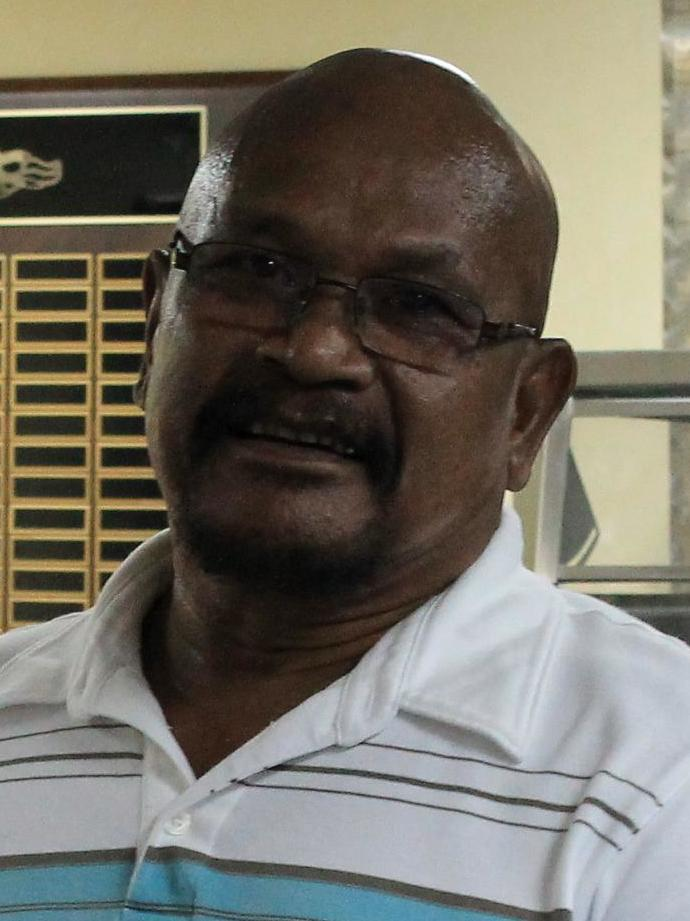
- Bells in 2013

8th Vice President of Palau
- In office 17 January 2013 – 19 January 2017
- President: Tommy Remengesau
- Preceded by: Kerai Mariur
- Succeeded by: Raynold Oilouch

Justice Minister of Palau
- In office 2013–2017
- President: Thomas Remengesau Jr.
- Preceded by: John C. Gibbons
- Succeeded by: Raynold Oilouch

Speaker of the House of Delegates of Palau
- In office April 2007 – November 2008
- Preceded by: Augustine Mesebeluu
- Succeeded by: Noah Idechong
- In office April 2004 – November 2004
- Preceded by: Mario S. Gulibert
- Succeeded by: Augustine Mesebeluu

Personal details
- Born: 6 July 1948 (age 78) Trust Territory of the Pacific Islands (Now Palau)
- Party: Independent
- Education: University of Montana

Antonio Bells (born 6 July 1948) is a Palauan politician who served as the Vice President of Palau and Minister of Justice between 17 January 2013 and 19 January 2017.

== Political career ==
He graduated from the University of Montana with a degree in economics. He is a former delegate to the House of Delegates of Palau from the state of Ngaraard, since the 1996 elections. He served twice as the speaker of the House of Delegates: from April 2004 to November 2004, and April 2007 to November 2008.

Political offices
Preceded by John C. Gibbons	Justice Minister of Palau; 2013-2017	Succeeded by Raynold Oilouch
Preceded by Kerai Mariur	Vice President of Palau; 2013–2017	Succeeded by Raynold Oilouch
