= Surangel Whipps Jr. =

President of Palau since 2021

The Honorable Surangel Whipps Jr.
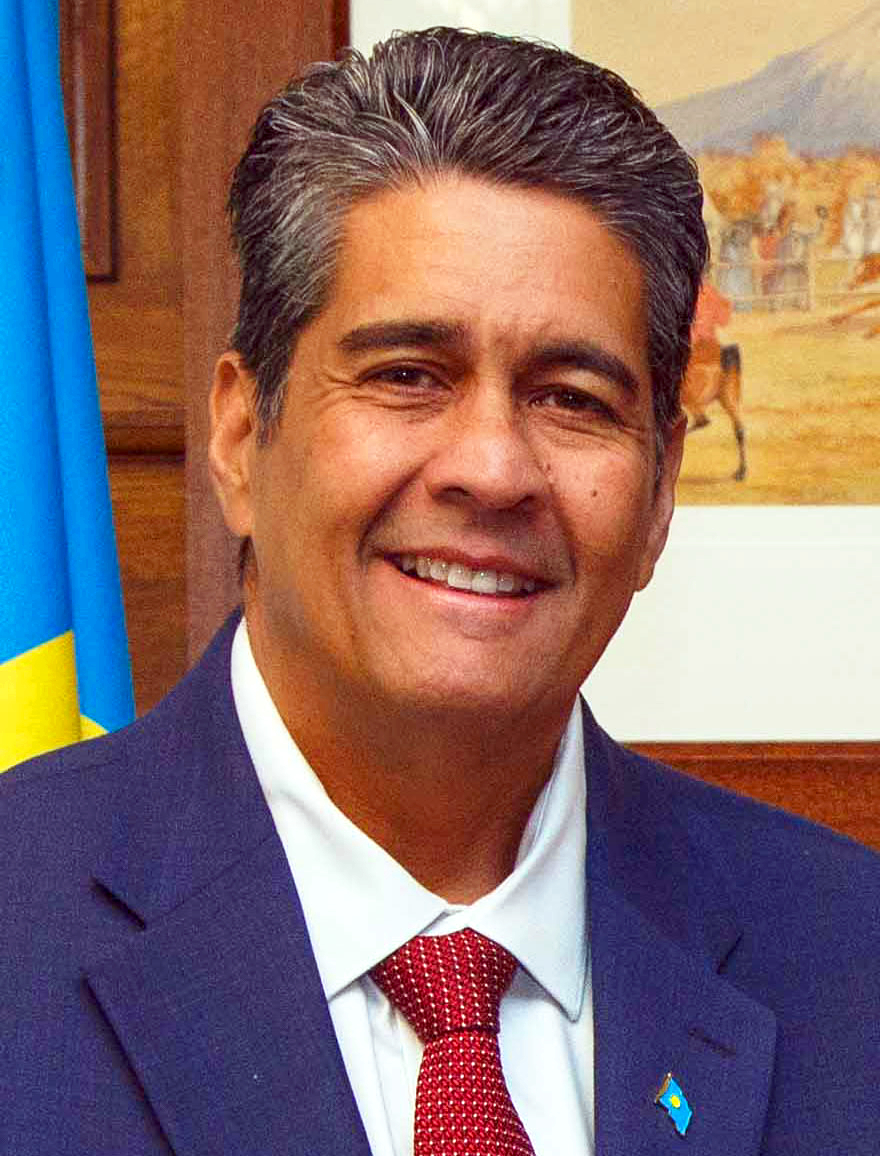
- Whipps in 2026

10th President of Palau
- Incumbent
- Assumed office 21 January 2021
- Vice President: Uduch Sengebau Senior; Raynold Oilouch
- Preceded by: Thomas Remengesau Jr.

Member of the Senate of Palau
- In office 2009–2016

Personal details
- Born: 9 August 1968 (age 58) Baltimore, Maryland, U.S.
- Party: Independent
- Spouse: Valerie Whipps (m. 1999)
- Children: 4
- Parent(s): Surangel S. Whipps (father); Marilyn C. Whipps (mother)
- Relatives: Mason Whipps (brother); Thomas Remengesau Jr. (brother-in-law); Thomas Remengesau Sr. (father-in-law; deceased)
- Education: Andrews University (BS); UCLA Anderson School of Management (MBA)
- Whipps's voice Whipps speaking at Our Ocean Conference 2024; Recorded April 16, 2024

Surangel Samuel Whipps Jr. (born 9 August 1968) is a Palauan businessman and politician who has served as the president of Palau since 2021. He previously served as a senator from 2009 to 2016. He is an advocate for environmental conservation, economic reform, and maintaining Palau's diplomatic ties with Taiwan. After an unsuccessful bid for the presidency in 2016, he was elected in the 2020 presidential election. He won re-election in 2024.

== Early life and education ==
Whipps was born in Baltimore, Maryland, to a Palauan father and a mother from Maryland. His father was Surangel S. Whipps, a Palauan businessman, former Speaker of the House and Senate President, who instilled in him the values of hard work and public service. The family returned to Palau in 1972.

He earned a Bachelor of Science in Business Administration with a major in Economics from Andrews University in Michigan in 1988. He later earned a Master of Business Administration from the UCLA Anderson School of Management in 1992.

== Business career ==
Upon returning to Palau after his studies, Whipps joined the family business, Surangel and Sons Company, which was founded by his father in 1980. He was appointed President and CEO of the company, leading its expansion from a single-floor store with 50 employees to a diversified corporation employing over 600 people, with interests in supermarkets, hardware, auto sales, quarrying, and construction. The experience of growing up in the family business gave him direct insight into the challenges faced by Palauan workers and business owners.

== Political career ==
=== Senate tenure (2008–2016) ===
Whipps was first elected to the Senate of Palau in 2008. He ran as a write-in candidate after the filing deadline had passed, making history by winning with 66% of the vote. He served two terms in the 8th and 9th Olbiil Era Kelulau (Palau National Congress) from 2009 to 2016. During his tenure, he was known for his work on economic and labor issues.

As a senator, he successfully pushed for the first increase to the national minimum wage since it was initially enacted in 1997 by his father. The bill he introduced in the 9th OEK raised Palau's minimum wage, a key step in his platform of prioritizing Palauan workers ("Palauans First"). He has continued this advocacy as president, with subsequent increases phasing the minimum wage to $5.00 per hour by 2025.

Whipps also conducted over 100 oversight hearings aimed at promoting transparency and accountability in government services.

=== 2016 presidential campaign ===
In the 2016 Palauan general election, Whipps ran for president against his brother-in-law, the incumbent President Thomas Remengesau Jr.. In a close race, Remengesau received 5,109 votes while Whipps won 4,854 votes.

== Presidency (2021–present) ==
=== First term (2021–2025) ===
Whipps was elected president in the 2020 presidential election, defeating Vice President Raynold Oilouch. His campaign slogan, "A Kot a Rechad er Belau" (Palauans First), was originally used by his father. He was inaugurated on 21 January 2021.

Upon taking office, Whipps took a strong stance on foreign policy, vowing to oppose illegal fishing and trespassing in Palauan waters by Chinese vessels and to maintain Palau's recognition of Taiwan. He also prioritized the distribution of COVID-19 vaccines to Palau's population, beginning with healthcare workers.

Whipps emerged as a prominent voice on climate change. At the COP26 summit in Glasgow in 2021, he gave a speech calling on world leaders to take action, stating: "Bold, unified action, led to transformation, we must act together... We are drowning, and our only hope is the life-ring you are holding." He drew a parallel between the climate crisis and a traditional Palauan story, warning that if action wasn't taken, developed nations "might as well drop bombs on our islands."

=== Second term (2025–present) ===
Whipps was re-elected for a second term following the November 2024 general election. He secured 5,626 votes, defeating his predecessor and brother-in-law, Thomas Remengesau Jr., who received 4,103 votes. The election was seen as a referendum on his first-term policies, including tax reforms and economic development initiatives.

== Personal life ==
Whipps married Valerie Esang Remengesau in 1999; the couple have four children: three daughters and one son. He is an active member of the Koror Seventh-day Adventist Church, where he has served as a deacon. He is also a board member of the Guam Seventh-day Adventist Clinic and former chairman of the Palau Adventist School board. He enjoys fishing, boating, and basketball.

Political offices
Preceded by Thomas Remengesau Jr.	President of Palau; 2021–present	Incumbent
