= Raynold Oilouch =

Palauan politician

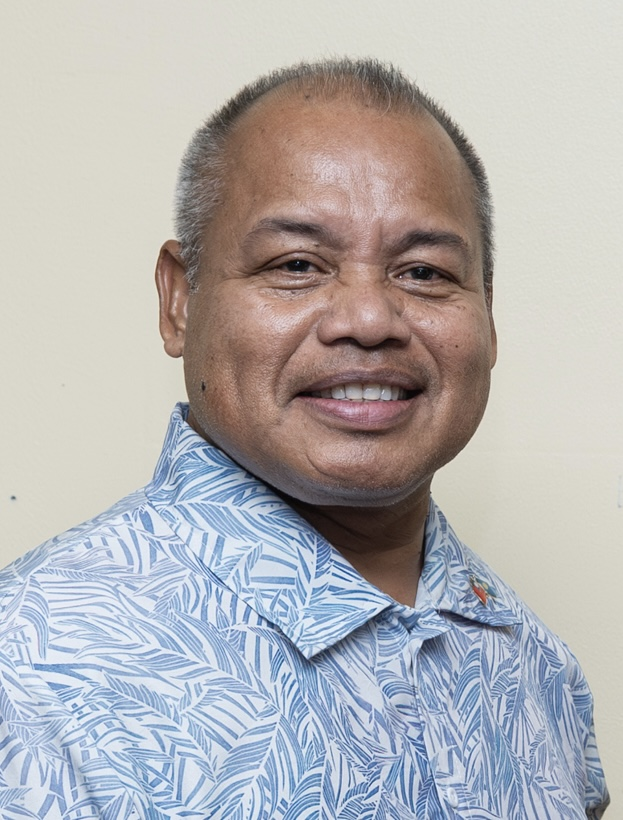
- Oilouch in 2026

9th & 11th Vice President of Palau
- Incumbent
- Assumed office 16 January 2025
- President: Surangel Whipps Jr.
- Preceded by: Uduch Sengebau Senior
- In office 19 January 2017 – 21 January 2021
- President: Thomas Remengesau Jr.
- Preceded by: Antonio Bells
- Succeeded by: Uduch Sengebau Senior

10th Minister of Justice
- In office 19 January 2017 – 21 January 2021
- President: Thomas Remengesau Jr.
- Preceded by: Antonio Bells
- Succeeded by: Uduch Sengebau Senior

Personal details
- Born: Raynold B. Oilouch c. 1965 Ngerulmud, Palau
- Party: Independent
- Children: 3
- Education: Canberra College of Advanced Education

Raynold B. Oilouch (born 1965) is a Palauan politician.

== Career ==
He has served as the Vice President of Palau from 19 January 2017 to 21 January 2021, and again since 16 January 2025. Oilouch was elected vice president in the 2016 elections. He was also the Minister of Justice from January 2017 to January 2021, and minister of health since January 2025.

Before his term as vice president, he served as senator from Ngchesar in the Senate of Palau.

Oilouch has a bachelor's degrees in both social sciences and economics from Canberra College of Advanced Education. He has also been practicing law in Palau since 1998.

Political offices
Preceded by Kerai Mariur	Vice President of Palau; 2017–2021	Succeeded by Uduch Sengebau Senior
Preceded by Antonio Bells	Justice Minister of Palau; 2017-2021	Succeeded by Uduch Sengebau Senior
