= Thomas Remengesau Jr. =

7th and 9th President of Palau

His Excellency Thomas Remengesau Jr.
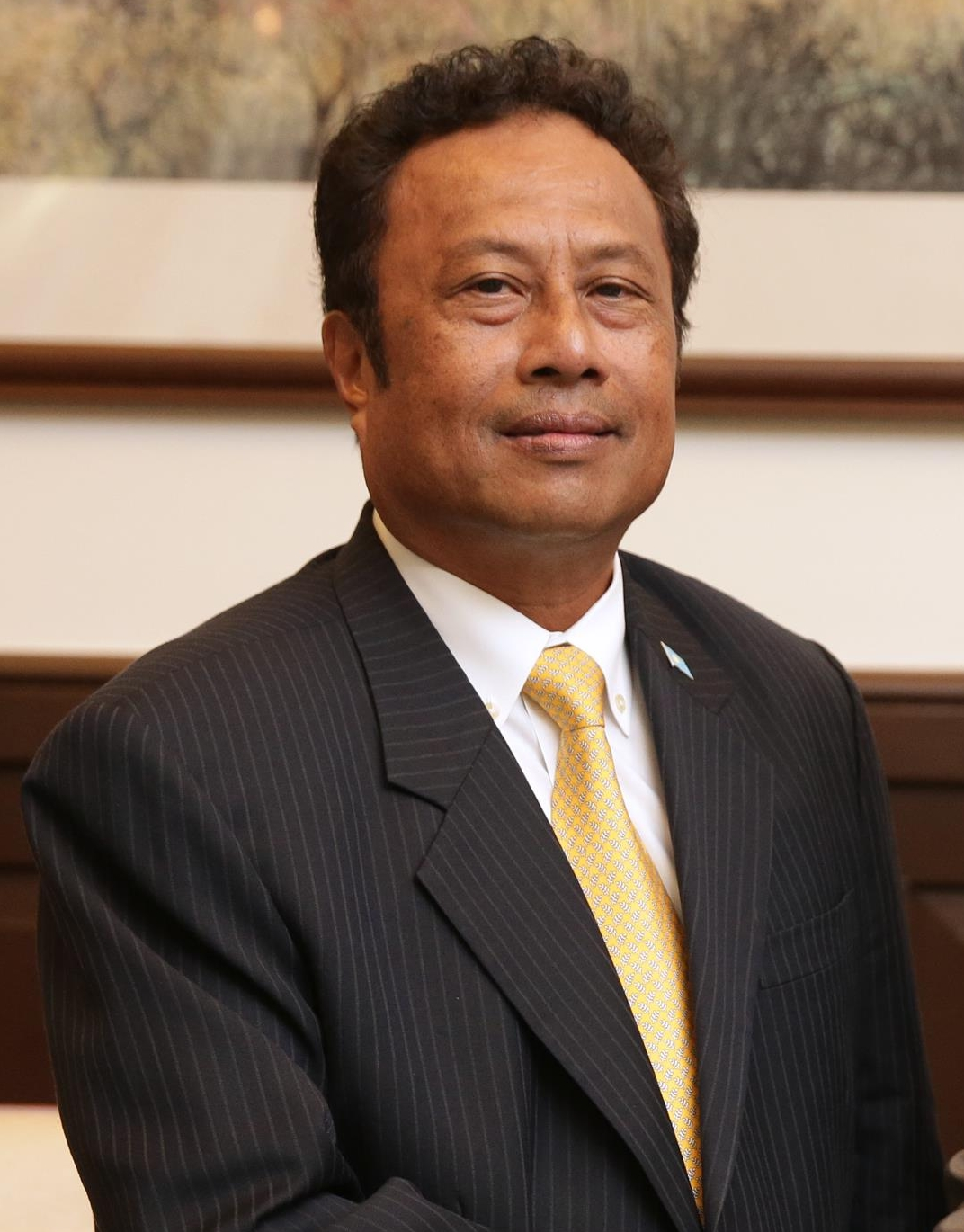
- Remengesau in May 2016

7th & 9th President of Palau
- In office 17 January 2013 – 21 January 2021
- Vice President: Antonio Bells; Raynold Oilouch
- Preceded by: Johnson Toribiong
- Succeeded by: Surangel Whipps Jr.
- In office 1 January 2001 – 15 January 2009
- Vice President: Sandra Pierantozzi; Elias Camsek Chin
- Preceded by: Kuniwo Nakamura
- Succeeded by: Johnson Toribiong

4th Vice President of Palau
- In office 1 January 1993 – 1 January 2001
- President: Kuniwo Nakamura
- Preceded by: Kuniwo Nakamura
- Succeeded by: Sandra Pierantozzi

5th Minister of Administration of Palau
- In office January 1993 – January 2001
- President: Kuniwo Nakamura
- Preceded by: Sandra Pierantozzi
- Succeeded by: Sandra Pierantozzi (as Minister of Finance)

Personal details
- Born: Thomas Esang Remengesau Jr. 28 February 1956 (age 70) Koror, Trust Territory of the Pacific Islands (now Palau)
- Party: Independent
- Spouse: Debbie Remengesau
- Children: 4 (including TJ Imrur)
- Parent(s): Thomas Remengesau Sr. Ferista Esang Remengesau
- Relatives: Valerie Whipps (Sister); Surangel Whipps (Brother-in-law)
- Education: Grand Valley State University
- Remengesau's voice Remengesau in an interview with the Tara Expeditions Foundation; Recorded February 9, 2018

Thomas Esang Remengesau Jr. (born 28 February 1956) is a Palauan politician. He served as the Palauan president between 2001-2009 and 2013-2021. He served as a Senator in the Palau National Congress between his two administrations. In sum, Remengesau was elected Vice-President of Palau in 1992 and 1996, then president in 2000, 2004, 2012 and 2016.

Intending to make Palau less dependent upon United States aid, Remengesau has promoted the expansion and growth of tourism in Palau with the slogan "Preserve the Best and Improve the Rest". The "best" refers to Palau's especially bountiful and diverse marine water resources surrounding the islands, and, as a venue of underwater attractions, its reputation among the very top in the world. In foreign affairs, Remengesau has actively advanced Palau's presence in the United Nations, elevating Palau to leadership among the international community through such environmental initiatives as the Micronesian Challenge. He is also a leader among South Pacific nations in advocating awareness of global warming and its effects in the South Pacific Region.

In 2024, Remengesau ran for a fifth term in office, but decisively lost the election to incumbent Surangel Whipps Jr., making it the first election he ever lost.

== Early life ==
Remengesau was born in Koror, Palau. His father was Thomas Remengesau Sr., who was District Administrator of Palau during the Trust Territory era, as well as Minister of Justice, Vice President, and briefly President of Palau. His mother, Ferista Esang Remengesau, also served as First Lady of Palau. Remengesau was educated at Grand Valley State University in Allendale, Michigan, in the United States, graduating from there in 1979.

== Political career ==
=== First service as senator, vice presidency, and first presidency ===
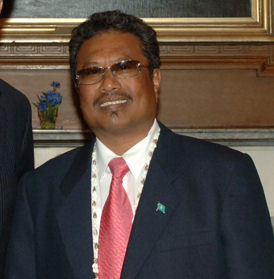
Remengesau in 2008.

At 28 years old, Remengesau targeted the youth voting bloc of Palau and successfully lobbied for their support, in the process becoming known as one of the forefront advocates for the youth of Palau. Remengesau was then elected in 1984 to the Palau National Congress (Olbiil Era Kelulau), carried by the youth and a grassroots campaign to become the youngest senator in the nation's history at the age of 28. In 1992, he was elected Vice President of Palau and served two terms. He held the additional portfolio of Minister of Administration of Palau. In 2000, with the support of outgoing President Kuniwo Nakamura, he won the presidential election, defeating ex-senator Peter Sugiyama by a margin of 52% to 46%. He easily won re-election in 2004, defeating Polycarp Basilius by a margin of 66.5% to 33.5%, in a race dogged with rumors of improper financial influence from Taipei and Beijing.

In December 2003, following the DePaiva family murders, Remengesau expressed shock at the killings and offered apologies to the surviving daughter and her family on behalf of Palauans, saying that the country had never seen a crime like that before, urging Palauans to fight drug abuse and uphold service to the family and society.

=== As Senator again ===
Remengesau announced in 2008 that he would seek a senatorial seat in the Senate of Palau in the 2008 general election. He came in 11th in the election.

Remengesau was succeeded by President Johnson Toribiong on January 15, 2009.

In April 2009, Special Prosecutor Michael Copeland, who served as Assistant Attorney General of Palau, launched an investigation along with a Special Task Force, stating that "office received information that gave probable cause to believe evidence of criminal activity is contained on the hard drives of seized computers." Senator Remengesau decried the whole process as an act of "selective prosecution". After much speculation and media tabloid surrounding the investigation, Remengesau was found only to have been guilty of not filing properties of land and their values and accrued interest. Remengesau was charged with 19 counts of violating Palau's code of ethics for failing to disclose his interests in real properties and other assets in 2002 and 2003. The charges bear on the lack of filing of the transfers and the values of said properties. Remengesau has said that, "I am being charged for basically technical information related to the filing of personal assets under the Code of Ethics law." “It was incomplete but it’s not like that we did not file anything. When we filed in years 2000-2002, we believed that what we were filing was in compliance with the law,” Remengesau said.

When asked about the verdict, he replied: “It is interesting because in our inquiries, roughly 90 percent filed the same way I did. And it is also an eye opener. I learned a lot from this trial and I hope other officials will also learn something from this because they will now change the way they disclose their assets.” He added, “From now on, everyone who acquired land through tradition will also disclose it in their financial disclosure.” In April 2010, Associate Justice Kathleen Salii imposed a fine of US$156,400 on Remengesau. Although prosecutor Michael Copeland recommended a fine of US$1,357,500, Copeland would go on to express his satisfaction with the sentence in media interviews.

=== Second presidency ===
He took office as President again in 2013, after defeating his successor Johnson Toribiong in the November 2012 Palauan election. Due to his work regarding Palau's environment, Remengesau received the Pacific Champion Award in 2013, as well as the United Nations' Champion of the Earth title, the Inspiring Conservation Award, and the IGFA Conservation Award, all in 2014. In 2016, he received the Peter Benchley Ocean Award for Excellence in National Stewardship. He appeared in the 2016 documentary film Before the Flood to discuss the vulnerability of Palau to sea level rise.

He was challenged in his bid for a fourth term in the November 2016 election by his brother-in-law, Senator Surangel Whipps Jr. He received 5,109 votes compared to Whipps' 4,854. He succeeded his father as the Maderngebuked of Ngaraard.

== Personal life ==
He is married to Debbie Remengesau.

== Honors ==
- Order of Brilliant Jade with Grand Cordon (Republic of China - 2007)

Political offices
| Preceded by Kuniwo Nakamura | Vice President of Palau; 1993–2001 | Succeeded by Sandra Pierantozzi |
| Preceded by Kuniwo Nakamura | President of Palau; 2001–2009 | Succeeded by Johnson Toribiong |
| Preceded by Johnson Toribiong | President of Palau; 2013–2021 | Succeeded by Surangel Whipps Jr. |
