= Rukebai Inabo =

Palauan politician

- Inabo in 2024

Member of the Senate of Palau
- Incumbent
- Assumed office January 2013

Personal details
- Born: Palau
- Party: Independent

Rukebai Kikuo Skey Inabo (b. 1958) is a Palauan politician, who has been a member of the Senate of Palau since 2013. Prior to entering politics, Inabo was a businesswoman who worked at the Office of the Public Auditor, the Philippine Prudential Life Insurance Company, the Bank of Hawaii and was CEO at the Palau Public Utilities Corporation. She joined the Senate of Palau at the 2016 Palauan general election.
