= Mlib Tmetuchl =

Palauan politician

President of the Senate of Palau
- In office 15 January 2009 – 16 January 2013
- Preceded by: Surangel S. Whipps
- Succeeded by: Elias Camsek Chin

Mlib Tmetuchl is a Palauan businessman and politician. He was elected to the Senate of Palau in 2000. He was the President of the Senate of Palau from 15 January 2009 to 16 January 2013.
