= Sabino Anastacio =

Palauan politician

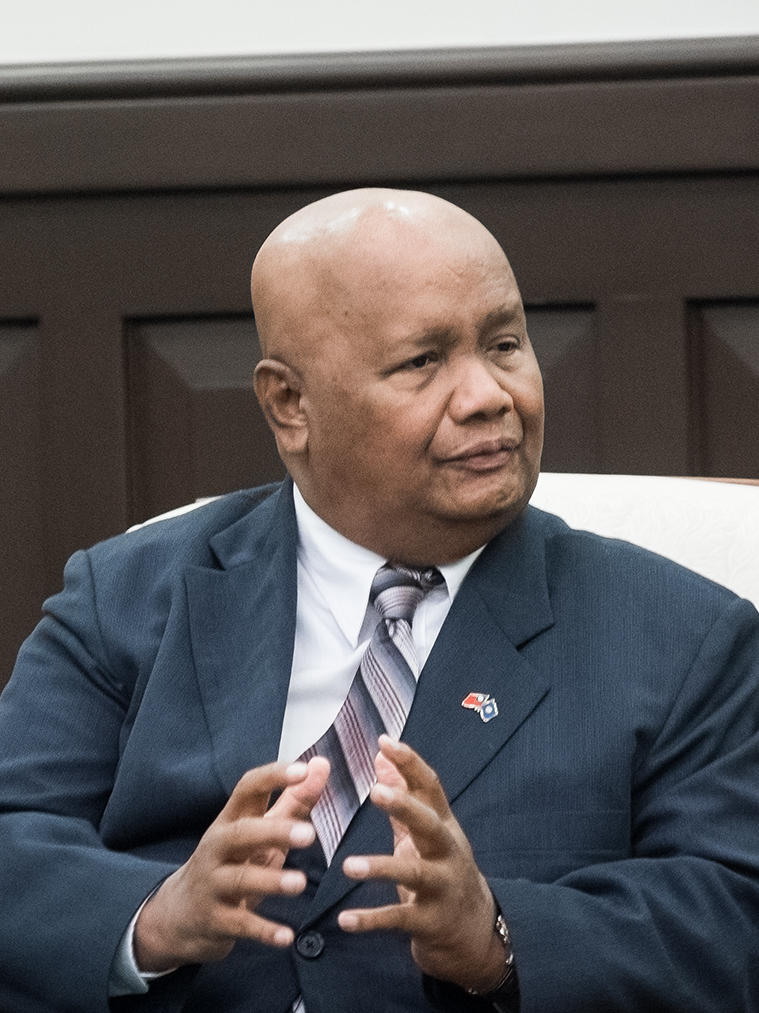

Speaker of the House of Delegates of Palau
- In office January 2013 – 16 January 2025
- Preceded by: Noah Idechong
- Succeeded by: Gibson Kanai

Minister of State
- In office 1997 – January 2001
- President: Kuniwo Nakamura
- Preceded by: Andres Uherbelau
- Succeeded by: Temmy Shmull

Personal details
- Born: 13 April 1953 (age 73) Koror
- Relatives: Ignacio Anastacio (brother)

Sabino Anastacio is a Palauan politician who was the speaker of the House of Delegates of Palau from January 2013 to January 2025.

== Political career ==
Anastacio was born on 13 April 1953, in Koror. He studied for two years at the University of Hawaiʻi at Hilo. He graduated with a bachelor's degree in business administration in 1977 from the University of Colorado. He also studied law in Gonzaga University of Law.

His successful run for the Senate of Palau was in 1996 representing Babeldaob and Kayangel. He was vice chair of foreign affairs committee, and member of various other Senate committees.

In 1997, Anastacio was appointed by then President Kuniwo Nakamura as Minister of State, and got unanimously confirmed by the Senate of Palau. He served in that role until his election in January 2001 as Ngchesar State delegate to the House of Delegates of Palau. He represented Ngchesar until his defeat in the 2024 elections.

Anastacio advocates for Palau to switch recognition from Republic of China to People's Republic of China. He was part of a delegation to Taiwan in 2017.

== Personal life ==
He is a brother of Ignacio Anastacio.
