= Mario Gulibert =

Palauan politician

Mario S. Gulibert

Speaker of the House of Delegates of Palau
- Incumbent
- Assumed office 5 October 2026
- Preceded by: Gibson Kanai
- In office January 2001 – April 2004
- Preceded by: Ignacio Anastacio
- Succeeded by: Antonio Bells

Personal details
- Born: 6 December 1953 (age 72) Angaur

Mario S. Gulibert is a Palauan politician, a member of the House of Delegates since 1988, and speaker of the House of Delegates of Palau since 2026. He held the speakership first time from January 2001 to April 2004.

== Biography ==
Gulibert was born in Angaur on 6 December 1953. He earned his degree with emphasis on pre-law in 1974 at the College of Southern Idaho. In 1981 he earned a degree in political science and a master's degree in public administration from Boise State University.

Gulibert taught at the former Micronesian Occupational College. He was elected as a member of the Angaur Constitutional Convention where he served as a committee chairman. From 1981 to 1988, he worked as chief of the division of public affairs until his 1988 election to House of Delegates of Palau for the State of Angaur.

Delegate Gulibert served the greater part of his fourth term of office as speaker of the House of Delegates from January 2001 to April 2004. He had to resign as a speaker in March 2004. He represents the State of Angaur, and he has been re-elected since 1988. He has also served as floor leader. He was elected as the vice-speaker of the House of Delegates in 2025, and elected again as the speaker of the House of Delegates on 5 October 2026.
