= House of Delegates of Palau =

Lower house of the Palau National Congress

House of Delegates
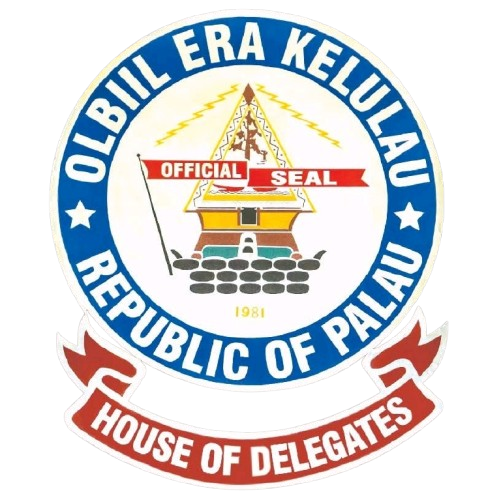

Type
- Type: Lower house of the Palau National Congress

Leadership
- Speaker of the House of Delegates: Mario Gulibert since 5 October 2026
- Vice Speaker: Timothy Sinsak since 5 October 2026
- Floor Leader: Noah Kemesong since 5 October 2026

Structure
- Seats: 16
- Length of term: 4 years

Elections
- Voting system: First-past-the-post voting
- Last election: 5 November 2024
- Next election: 7 November 2028

Meeting place
- Olbiil era Kelulau building in the Capitol of Palau complex, Ngerulmud

The House of Delegates of Palau is the lower house of the Palau National Congress (Olbiil era Kelulau), Palau's bicameral legislature. The Senate of Palau is the upper house. The House of Delegates has 16 members, each serving four-year terms in single-seat constituencies. Each state represents one constituency. No political parties exist. The last election was held on 5 November 2024.

== Palau Legislature 1955-1980 ==
The High Commissioner of the Trust Territory of the Pacific Islands established Palau legislature, Olbiil era Kelulau, in January 1955 by a charter. The legislature was composed of 28 members elected every four years. The presiding officer was initially called Bedul Olbiil. The members of the legislature were organized into Liberal and Progressive parties.

Speaker of Legislature	Took office	Left office	Notes
Roman Tmetuchl	1956	1957 - ?	
Takeo Yano	? - 1959	1959 - ?	
Jonathan Emul	? - 1960	1960 - ?	
Thomas Remengesau Sr.	? - 1961	1961 - ?	
David Ramarui	? - 1962	1962 - ?	
Toribiong Uchel	? - 1963	1965	Died in office
Jacob Sawaichi	1965	1966	
Itelbang Luii	1966	October 1975	
Sadang Silmai	October 1975	December 1979	
Tosiwo Nakamura	December 1979	November 1980	

== Speaker of the House of Delegates ==
Name	Took office	Left office	Notes
Carlos Salii	January 1981	July 1985	
Santos Olikong	July 1985	November 1988	
Shiro Kyota	January 1989	November 1992	
Surangel S. Whipps	28 January 1993	November 1996	
Ignacio Anastacio	January 1997	November 2000	
Mario S. Gulibert	January 2001	April 2004	
Antonio Bells	April 2004	November 2004	
Augustine Mesebeluu	January 2005	April 2007	
Antonio Bells	April 2007	November 2008	
Noah Idechong	15 January 2009	November 2012	
Sabino Anastacio	January 2013	16 January 2025	
Gibson Kanai	16 January 2025	5 October 2026	
Mario S. Gulibert	5 October 2026	Incumbent	
