= 2008 Palauan general election =

- 4 November 2008
- Presidential election
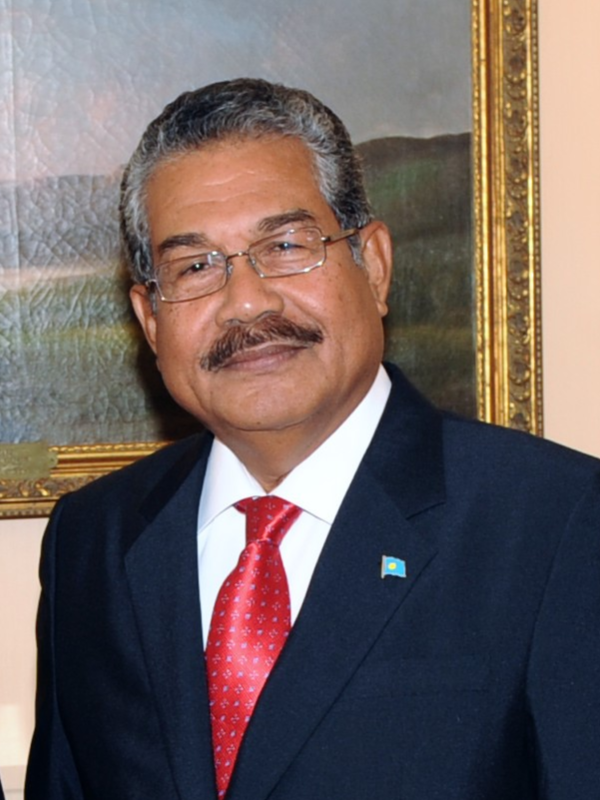

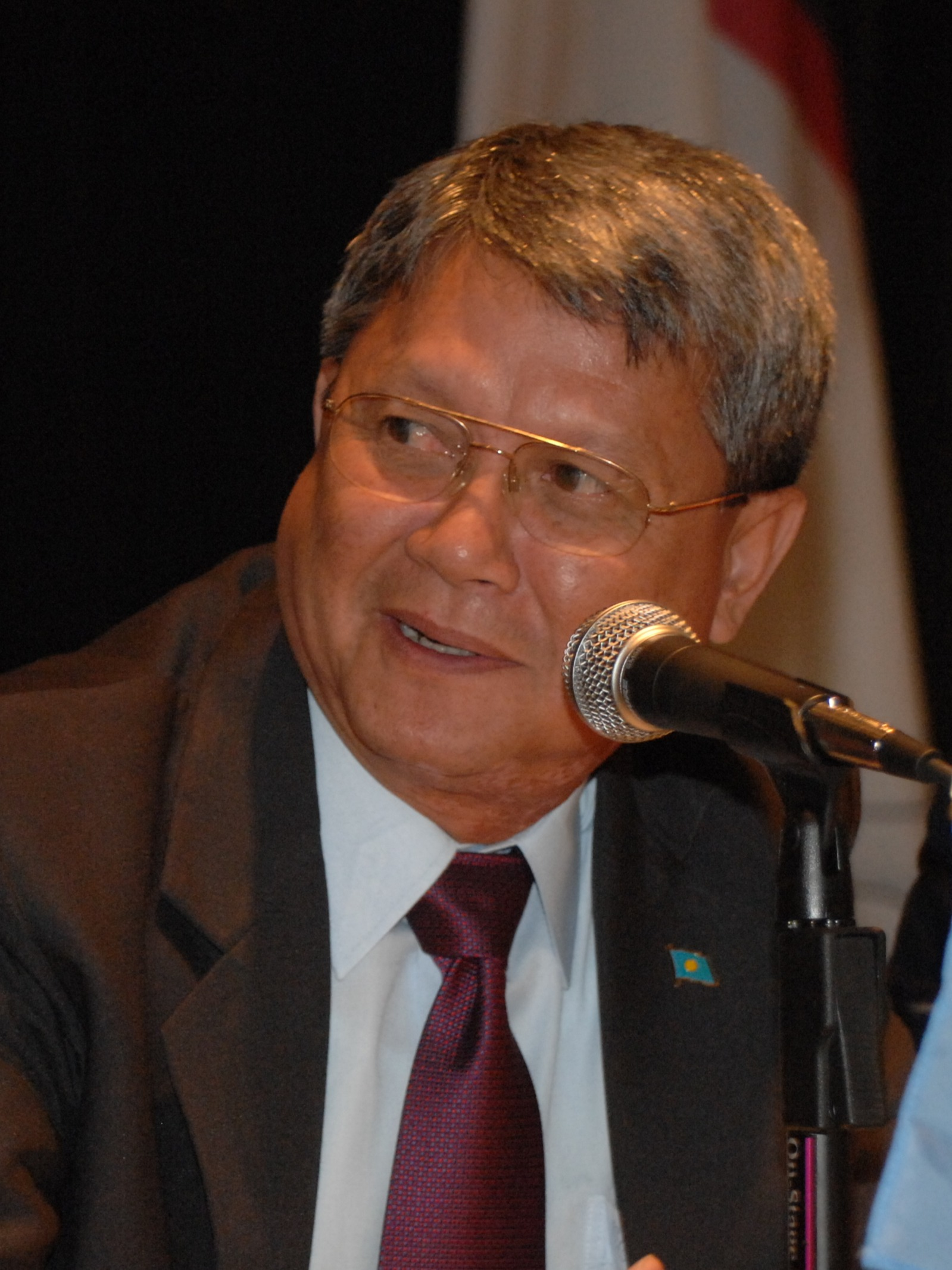
Nominee	Johnson Toribiong	Elias Camsek Chin
Party	Independent	Independent
Running mate	Kerai Mariur	Alan R. Seid
Popular vote	5,040	4,828
Percentage	51.07%	48.93%
President before election
Tommy Remengesau
Independent
Elected President
Johnson Toribiong
Independent

General elections were held in Palau on 4 November 2008 to elect the President and members of the National Congress. The presidential election was won by Johnson Toribiong. Incumbent President Tommy Remengesau was ineligible to run because he had served the maximum two consecutive terms allowed and announced that he would run for a seat in the Senate.

This was the first election in Palau in which presidential candidates ran with a declared vice-presidential candidates. In previous elections, the President and vice-presidents had been elected separately, and the winners of those elections served as a "national leadership team".

== Presidential candidates ==
Primary elections were held on 23 September, with two candidates progressing to the general election in November. Four candidates registered for the primary elections:

- Elias Camsek Chin – The incumbent Vice-President was seeking a promotion to the Palauan presidency. His running mate was Senator Alan R. Seid.
- Johnson Toribiong – Ambassador to the Republic of China (Taiwan), and he was running with Delegate Kerai Mariur.
- Surangel S. Whipps – President of the Senate and his running mate was Billy Kuartei, the Chief of Staff for President Remengesau.
- Joshua Koshiba – Senator and his running mate was Governor of Peleliu Jackson Ngiraingas.

== Campaign ==
All four presidential candidates and their running mates held rallies throughout Palau. Campaigning also took place in overseas Palauan communities in the mainland United States, Hawaii, Guam and the Northern Mariana Islands.

A total of 43 candidates ran for the thirteen seats in the Senate, while 44 candidates contested the sixteen seats in the House of Delegates. A record ten women were competing for seats in the Senate and House of Delegates, with seven women running for the at large Senate race.

== Results ==
=== President ===
Elias Chin and Johnson Toribiong were the top two vote-getters in the primary elections. Chin and Toribiong then faced each other in the general election. In early, preliminary results Toribiong held a 130-vote lead over Chin, with 1,629 votes to Chin's 1,499. Toribiong and his running mate, Kerai Mariur, were declared the winner of the election on 7 November. It was reported that Toribiong had received a concession phone call from Vice-President Chin.

Candidate	Running mate	Primary		General	
Candidate	Running mate	Votes	%	Votes	%
Elias Camsek Chin	Alan Seid	3,027	32.95	4,828	48.93
Johnson Toribiong	Kerai Mariur	2,526	27.49	5,040	51.07
Surangel Whipps	Billy Kuartei	2,248	24.47		
Joshua Koshiba	Jackson Ngiraingas	1,387	15.10		
Total		9,188	100.00	9,868	100.00
Valid votes		9,188	98.85	9,868	94.26
Invalid/blank votes		107	1.15	601	5.74
Total votes		9,295	100.00	10,469	100.00
Registered voters/turnout				14,289	73.27
Source: Shuster

=== Senate ===
Surangel Whipps, Jr. made history by becoming the first Senator to win by write-in. He also received the highest percentage (65%) of votes of any senatorial candidate since his father achieved 73.5% of the vote.

Party	Votes	%	Seats	+/–
Independents	121,994	100.00	13	+4
Total	121,994	100.00	13	+4
Total votes	10,469	–		
Registered voters/turnout	14,289	73.27		
Source: IPU

==== Elected members ====
1. Surangel Whipps Jr. (6,461)
2. Raynold Oilouch (6,073)
3. Mlib Tmetuchl (5,360)
4. Joel Toribiong (5,086)
5. Katharine Kesolei (4,947)
6. Mark U. Rudimch (4,891)
7. Hokkons Baules (4,437)
8. Adalbert Eledui (3,934)
9. Regina Mesebeluu(3,731)
10. Alfonso N. Diaz (3,603)
11. Tommy Remengesau Jr. (3,579)
12. Regis Akitaya (3,144)
13. Paul Ueki (3,044)

=== House of Delegates ===
Party	Votes	%	Seats	+/–
Independents	5,853	100.00	16	0
Total	5,853	100.00	16	0
Valid votes	5,853	96.01		
Invalid/blank votes	243	3.99		
Total votes	6,096	100.00		
Registered voters/turnout	14,289	42.66		
Source: IPU

==== By state ====
State	Candidate	Votes	Notes
Aimeliik	Kalistus Ngirturong	269	Elected
Aimeliik	Warren Umetaro	182	
Airai	Tmewang Rengulbai	525	Elected
Airai	Noah Secharraimul	389	
Angaur	Horace Rafael	172	Elected
Angaur	Natus Misech	121	
Hatohobei	Wayne Andrew	40	Elected
Hatohobei	Sebastian Marino	35	
Hatohobei	Huan Hosei	33	
Kayangel	Noah Kemesong	180	Elected
Kayangel	Jeffrey Titiml	120	
Koror	Alexander Merep	1,845	Elected
Koror	Salvador Tellames	700	
Koror	Hilaro Ngiraidong	385	
Melekeok	Lentcer Basilius	171	Elected
Melekeok	Teodoro Rengulbai	99	
Melekeok	Kazuo Asanuma	81	
Melekeok	Danny Ongelungel	60	
Ngaraard	Gibson Kanai	422	Elected
Ngaraard	Salvador Remoket	358	
Ngarchelong	Marhence Madrangchar	203	Elected
Ngarchelong	Faustina Rehuher-Marugg	191	
Ngarchelong	Dilmai Saiske	188	
Ngarchelong	Don Bukurrow	164	
Ngardmau	Rebluud Kesolei	193	Elected
Ngardmau	Balkuu Kumangai	92	
Ngaremlengui	Swenny Ongidobel	218	Elected
Ngaremlengui	Portia Franz	136	
Ngaremlengui	Alonzo Kyota	83	
Ngatpang	Jerry Nabeyama	97	Elected
Ngatpang	Valentino Emesiochel	89	
Ngchesar	Secilil Eldebechel	112	Elected
Ngchesar	Moses Uludong	99	
Ngchesar	Sirino Hideo	52	
Ngchesar	Zacheus Kotaro	44	
Ngchesar	Marcello Ngirkelau	42	
Ngchesar	Bonifacio Basilius	22	
Ngiwal	Noah Idechong	125	Elected
Ngiwal	Krispin Termeteet	52	
Ngiwal	Francis Llecholch	41	
Peleliu	Jonathan Isechal	338	Elected
Peleliu	Sinton Soalablai	256	
Sonsorol	Celestin Yangilmau	61	Elected
Sonsorol	Edwin Mario	42	
Sonsorol	Marcelino Xavier	30	
Source: Psephos
