= 2026 in Palau =

- Decades: 2000s; 2010s; 2020s
- See also: Other events of 2025; Timeline of Palauan history

The following lists events that happened during 2026 in the Republic of Palau.

== Incumbents ==
- President: Surangel S. Whipps Jr.
- Vice President:
  - Uduch Sengebau Senior
  - Raynold Oilouch
- President of the Senate: Hokkons Baules
- Speaker of the House of Delegates:
  - Sabino Anastacio
  - Gibson Kanai

== Events ==
- February 10 – The United States imposes sanctions on Senate president Hokkons Baules, citing corruption and support for Chinese interests.
- August 30–September 4 – 55th Pacific Islands Forum Leaders Meeting.

== Holidays ==
Date	Name
1 January	New Year's Day
14 March	Youth Day
5 May	Senior Citizens Day
1 June	President's Day
9 July	Constitution Day
1 September	Labour Day
1 October	Independence Day
24 October	United Nations Day
27 November	Thanksgiving Day
28 November	Family Day
25 December	Christmas Day
