= 2025 in Palau =

- Decades: 2000s; 2010s; 2020s
- See also: Other events of 2025; Timeline of Palauan history

The following lists events that happened during 2025 in the Republic of Palau.

== Incumbents ==
- President: Surangel S. Whipps Jr.
- Vice President:
  - Uduch Sengebau Senior
  - Raynold Oilouch
- President of the Senate: Hokkons Baules
- Speaker of the House of Delegates:
  - Sabino Anastacio
  - Gibson Kanai

== Events ==
- March 27 – Stan Shih is appointed the Financial Advisor of Palau.
- March 15 – The Philippines and Palau sign a Memorandum of Understanding to strengthen ties in the fisheries sector.
- June 29–July 9 – 2025 Pacific Mini Games
- December 24 – The United States and Palau reach an agreement for the latter to accept 75 migrants deported from the US in exchange for a $7.5 million-grant for public service and infrastructure needs.

== Deaths ==
- 28 February – Temmy Shmull (b. 1947), politician
- 5 July – Hans Ongelungel (b. 1956 or 1957), artist and activist

== Holidays ==
Date	Name
1 January	New Year's Day
14 March	Youth Day
5 May	Senior Citizens Day
1 June	President's Day
9 July	Constitution Day
1 September	Labour Day
1 October	Independence Day
24 October	United Nations Day
27 November	Thanksgiving Day
28 November	Family Day
25 December	Christmas Day
