= 2023 in Palau =

- Decades: 2000s; 2010s; 2020s
- See also: Other events of 2023; Timeline of Palauan history

The following lists events that happened during 2023 in the Republic of Palau.

== Incumbents ==
- President: Surangel S. Whipps Jr.
- Vice President: Uduch Sengebau Senior
- President of the Senate: Hokkons Baules
- Speaker of the House of Delegates: Sabino Anastacio

== Events ==
Ongoing – COVID-19 pandemic in Palau

== Deaths ==
- 1 April – Haruo H. Esang (b. 1936 or 1937), politician
- 5 May – Jonathan Isechal, politician
- 8 June – Isao Singeo (b. 1944 or 1945), Obak of Peleliu

== Sports ==
- 14 July - 30 July: Palau at the 2023 World Aquatics Championships.
- 19 August - 27 August: Palau at the 2023 World Athletics Championships
