= 2021 in Palau =

- Decades: 2000s; 2010s; 2020s
- See also: Other events of 2021; Timeline of Palauan history

The following lists events that happened during 2021 in the Republic of Palau.

== Incumbents ==
- President: Thomas Remengesau Jr. (until 21 January), Surangel S. Whipps Jr. (starting 21 January)
- Vice President: Raynold Oilouch (until 21 January), Uduch Sengebau Senior (starting 21 January)
- President of the Senate: Hokkons Baules
- Speaker of the House of Delegates: Sabino Anastacio

== Events ==
Ongoing – COVID-19 pandemic in Oceania

=== January ===
- January 2 – Palau receives 2,800 doses of the Moderna vaccine in a special contribution from the United States. The government announced that it will vaccinate healthcare workers first and then vaccinate seniors and people with medical conditions.
- January 7 - Palau begins its vaccination program, with outgoing President Thomas Remengesau Jr. and incoming President Surangel Whipps Jr. receiving the first two doses. The country plans to vaccinate more than 18,000 people with the Moderna vaccine provided by the United States.
- January 21 - Surangel Whipps Jr. assumes the office of President of Palau succeeding Thomas Remengesau Jr.

=== February ===
- February 5 - Palau announces its intention to withdraw from the Pacific Islands Forum after claiming fraudulence in the recent election for the organization's Secretary General.
- February 6 - The leaders of Palau, the Federated States of Micronesia, Nauru, Kiribati, and the Marshall Islands announce that they will meet on Monday to discuss leaving the Pacific Islands Forum after Marshallese candidate Gerald Zackios was not chosen as Secretary-General.
- February 8 - The Palau National Congress passes a joint resolution supporting the decision made by President Surangel Whipps Jr. to leave the Pacific Islands Forum. The National Congress says that the "gentleman's agreement was not honored".
- February 9 - Five countries: Palau, the Federated States of Micronesia, the Marshall Islands, Kiribati and Nauru, officially withdraw from the Pacific Islands Forum over a disagreement regarding the choice of the forum's new Secretary-General.
- February 22 - Fijian Prime Minister Frank Bainimarama urges the leaders of the Federated States of Micronesia, the Marshall Islands, Nauru, Kiribati, and Palau to reconsider their decision of leaving the Pacific Islands Forum and says that this is an opportunity to fight climate change. Bainimarama also invites U.S. President Joe Biden to the next forum meeting in August.

=== April ===
- April 1 - U.S. ambassador to Palau John Hennessey-Niland becomes the first sitting American envoy to visit Taiwan since the U.S. cut formal ties in 1979. The visit coincided with the opening of a COVID-19 "travel bubble" between Taiwan and Palau. The highest level visit in 42 years prompted anger from China, who warned the U.S. against "crossing its red line".

=== May ===
- May 31 - Palau announces their first recorded case of COVID-19 in a fully vaccinated person who travelled from Guam on May 9 and tested positive after 21 days in quarantine.

=== August ===
- August 9 - Palau reaches herd immunity as 80% of its 12-and-over population are vaccinated against COVID-19. Plans to vaccinate teenagers are underway as tourism reopens in the country.

=== September ===
- September 23 - Philippine foreign affairs secretary Teodoro Locsin Jr. meets with Palauan president Surangel Whipps Jr., with Locsin reiterating that the Philippines has a commitment to resolve a maritime dispute with Palau regarding a 200 nautical mile exclusive economic zone which both countries currently claim.

=== December ===
- Ibedul succession dispute

== Deaths ==
- May 21 – John C. Gibbons, politician
- October 25 – Paulus Wong (b. 1946 or 1947), Uongruious of Ngiwal
- November 4 – Yutaka Gibbons, activist and politician (b. 1944)
