= Ministry of Finance (Palau) =

Government ministry in Palau

Ministry overview
- Jurisdiction: Government of Palau
- Headquarters: Ngerulmud
- Website: www.palaugov.pw/executive-branch/ministries/finance/

The Ministry of Finance is a government agency of Palau, responsible for public finances of Palau. The ministry is located in Ngerulmud. The vision of the ministry includes to promote productivity of government services, and economic growth. The ministry employs about 11 to 50 persons.

The ministry is headed by Minister of Finance, who is member of the Cabinet of Palau. The Minister is nominated by President of Palau and needs to be confirmed by the Senate of Palau. Before the creation of the Ministry of Finance, there was a cabinet portfolio of Minister of Administration, who was also responsible for the treasury.

== Ministers of Administration ==
Name	Took office	Left office	President	Notes
Haruo Willter	1981	October 1985	Haruo Remeliik; Alfonso Oiterong	
Franz Reksid	1986	January 1989	Lazarus Salii; Thomas Remengesau Sr.	
Kuniwo Nakamura	January 1989	1992	Ngiratkel Etpison	
Sandra Pierantozzi	1992	January 1993	Ngiratkel Etpison	
Thomas Remengesau Jr.	January 1993	January 2001	Kuniwo Nakamura	

== Ministers of Finance ==
Name	Took office	Left office	President	Notes
Sandra Pierantozzi	January 2001	January 2002	Thomas Remengesau Jr.	
Elbuchel Sadang	January 2002	January 2009	Thomas Remengesau Jr.	
Kerai Mariur	January 2009	January 2013	Johnson Toribiong	
Elbuchel Sadang	April 2013	January 2021	Thomas Remengesau Jr.	
Kaleb Udui Jr.	February 2021	January 2025	Surangel Whipps Jr.	

== Failed ministerial nominations ==
- Secilil Eldebechel was appointed as Minister of Finance in January 2013, but the appointment was not confirmed by the Senate.
- Kaleb Udui Jr. was appointed as Minister of Finance for a second term in January 2025, but the appointment was not confirmed by the Senate.
