= 2024 in Palau =

- Decades: 2000s; 2010s; 2020s
- See also: Other events of 2024; Timeline of Palauan history

The following lists events that happened during 2024 in the Republic of Palau.

== Incumbents ==
- President: Surangel S. Whipps Jr.
- Vice President: Uduch Sengebau Senior
- President of the Senate: Hokkons Baules
- Speaker of the House of Delegates: Sabino Anastacio

== Events ==
- February 22 – A Palau-flagged cargo ship en route to Egypt is set ablaze after being hit by an anti-ship missile in the Gulf of Aden, according to the United Kingdom Maritime Trade Operations. No casualties are reported.
- November 5 – 2024 Palauan general election: Surangel Whipps Jr. is reelected president.

== Deaths ==
- 29 October – Tellames Johannes (b. 1972 or 1973), civil servant and security guard
