= 2022 in Palau =

- Decades: 2000s; 2010s; 2020s
- See also: Other events of 2022; Timeline of Palauan history

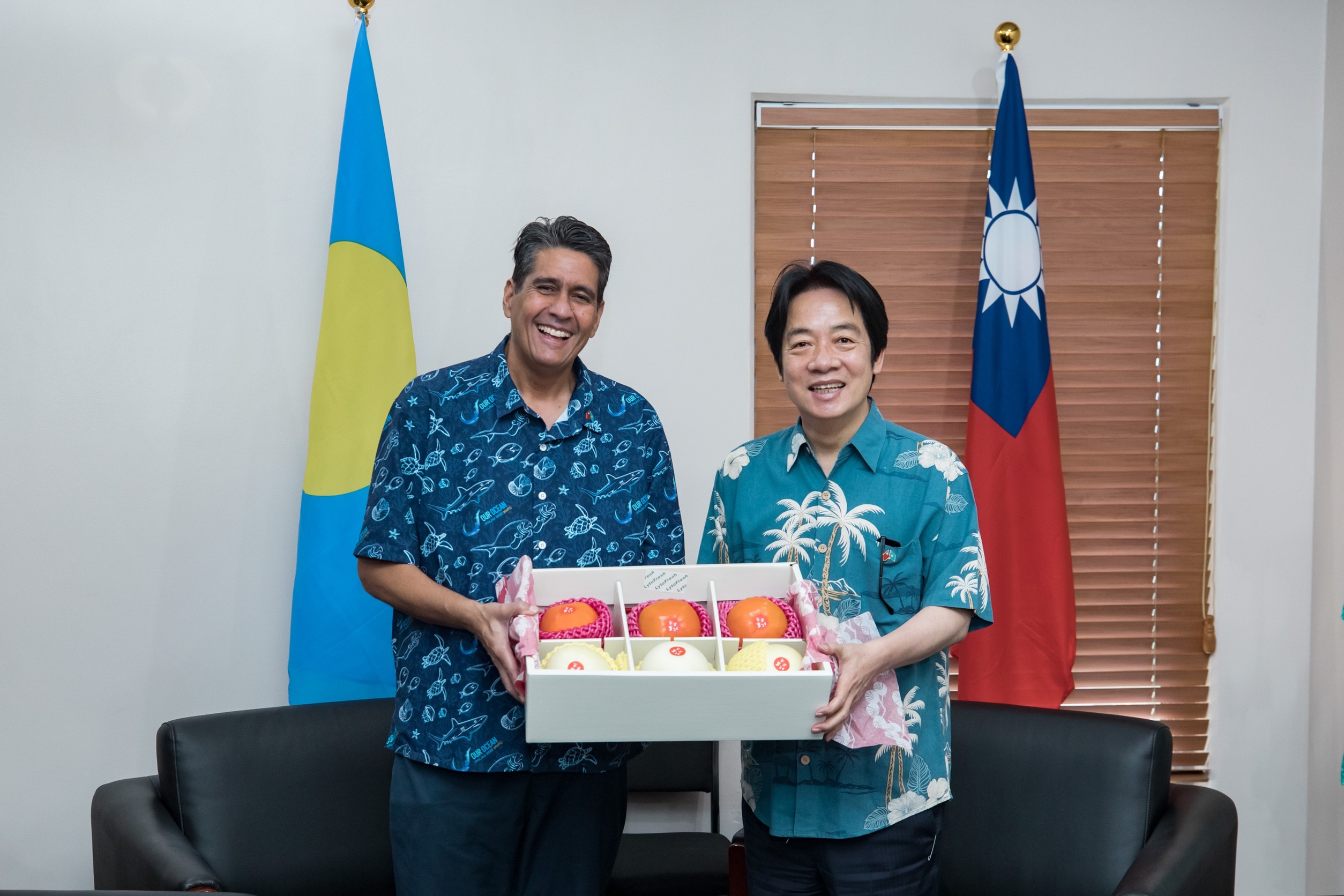
Taiwanese Vice President Lai arrives in Palau and meets President Surangel S. Whipps Jr. (2022/11/01)

The following lists events that happened during 2022 in the Republic of Palau.

== Incumbents ==
- President: Surangel S. Whipps Jr.
- Vice President: Uduch Sengebau Senior
- President of the Senate: Hokkons Baules
- Speaker of the House of Delegates: Sabino Anastacio

== Events ==
Ongoing – COVID-19 pandemic in Palau

- Ibedul succession dispute
- August 29 – During a trip to Taiwan, Vice President Uduch Sengebau Senior and her delegates are forced to quarantine after testing positive for COVID-19.

== Deaths ==
- 22 September – Regis Akitaya, politician
- 16 November – Arthur Ngirakelsong (b. 1941 or 1942), judge

== Sports ==
- June 18 - July 3: Palau at the 2022 World Aquatics Championships.
- July 15 - July 24: Palau at the 2022 World Aquatics Championships.
