= Rudimch =

Rudimch is a Palauan surname. Notable people with the surname include:

- Eyos Rudimch (fl. 2021), Palauan politician
- Isidoro Rudimch (1942–1999), Palauan politician
- Mark Rudimch (fl. 2009), Palauan politician
