= China–Palau relations =

- China: Palau

China–Palau relations refers to the bilateral relations between the People's Republic of China and the Republic of Palau. Palau recognizes the Republic of China, and is one of the few countries to maintain an embassy in Taipei. The Chinese Embassy in the Federated States of Micronesia is responsible for Palau-related affairs.

== History ==
Before Palau established diplomatic relations with the Republic of China in 1999, it maintained friendly relations with the People's Republic of China. On January 26, 1989, Ma Yuzhen, the Chinese Consul General in Los Angeles, attended the inauguration ceremony of the new President Ngiratkel Etpison in Koror at the invitation of the Palau government.

In March 1991, Palau President Nkilatkere Etpiseng visited China for a week at the invitation of the Chinese People's Institute of Foreign Affairs. He visited Beijing, Shanghai and Guangzhou. He was accompanied by Palau House of Representatives Speaker Ciro Kiyuta and Senate party leader Peter Sugiama. During the visit, Chinese President Yang Shangkun and Chinese People's Institute of Foreign Affairs President Han Nianlong met with the Palau President.

In March 1994, a Palauan congressional delegation visited China. Qiao Shi, Chairman of the Standing Committee of the National People's Congress, and Li Lanqing, Vice Premier of the State Council, met with the congressional delegation. On September 30, Jiang Zemin, General Secretary of the Chinese Communist Party and President of China, announced the Chinese government's decision to recognize the Palauan government.

Palau established diplomatic relations with Taiwan in 1999. In 2010, a Chinese petroleum company signed a US$40 million cooperation agreement with Palau to explore oil reserve around the islands country.

Journalists have reported on PRC united front influence operations linked to Chinese organized crime in Palau. Resort investments in Palau have been proposed by the Prince Group, a Chinese-Cambodian conglomerate founded by Chinese businessman Chen Zhi, which has been previously linked to money laundering, online scams, and human trafficking. In 2019, multiple media outlets reported that Wan Kuok-koi, a leader of 14K, attempted to lease land on Angaur with the goal of opening a casino.

In February 2015, the President of Palau ordered a reduction in flights from China to Palau starting in April. He said that the purpose of doing so was to take responsibility for the future of Palau and to ease the huge pressure from Chinese tourists.

In June 2020, Palau openly opposed the Hong Kong national security law.

In June 2023, the President of Palau stated that Chinese ships had recently entered Palau's exclusive economic zone several times and that he had asked the US military to increase patrols in the waters. In 2024, Palau's president Surangel S. Whipps accused China of being behind a March 2024 cyberattack on the country's institutions.

In 2025, Reuters and The Washington Post reported that an official with the United Front Work Department (UFWD) had made illegal political contributions to Palau politicians. They also reported that Chinese developers with links to the UFWD have leased land adjacent to U.S. military installations on Palau, which effectively blocks their expansion and provides a means for surveillance. In February 2026, the president of the Senate of Palau, Hokkons Baules, was barred from entering the U.S. due to allegations of corruption linked to the People's Republic of China.

In May 2026, a Chinese vessel entered Palau's Exclusive Economic Zone without requesting permission on the pretext of a research mission.
