= 2020 in Palau =

- Decades: 2000s; 2010s; 2020s
- See also: Other events of 2020; Timeline of Palauan history

The following lists events that happened during 2020 in the Republic of Palau.

== Incumbents ==
- President: Thomas Remengesau Jr.
- Vice President: Raynold Oilouch
- President of the Senate: Hokkons Baules
- Speaker of the House of Delegates: Sabino Anastacio

== Events ==
Ongoing – COVID-19 pandemic in Oceania

=== February ===
- February 1 – All charter flights from China, Macau, and Hong Kong were suspended by President Thomas Remengesau Jr. in an executive order until February 29. The order also quarantined all non-citizens who recently entered the country for fourteen days. Schools were also shut starting in April and Remengesau eventually suspended travel to the country.

=== September ===
- September 4 – It was revealed that the country urged the U.S. to build joint-use military facilities in the country, a move seen as a push back against Chinese influence in the Pacific. President Tommy Remengesau Jr. made the request in a letter to U.S. Secretary of Defense Mark Esper, who visited the island last week.
- September 14 – President Tommy Remengesau Jr. announced that he will be hosting an in-person meeting with the leaders of Kiribati, Nauru, the Federated States of Micronesia and the Marshall Islands, with Nauru's president saying the leaders agreed to attend the country's Independence Day on October 1 as the five Pacific countries remain free of COVID-19.

=== November ===
- November 3 – 2020 Palauan general election

== Deaths ==
- 16 May – Vann Isaac (b. 1975 or 1976), politician
- 14 October – Kuniwo Nakamura (b. 1943), President of Palau (1993–2001), in Koror
