= Sandra Pierantozzi =

Palauan politician

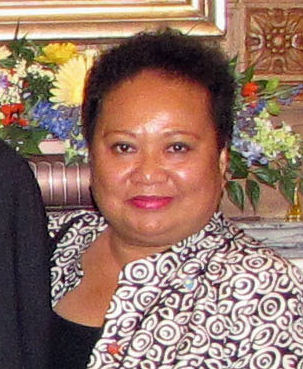
- Pierantozzi in 2009

Minister of State
- In office 2009–2010
- President: Johnson Toribiong
- Preceded by: Temmy Shmull
- Succeeded by: Ramon Rechebei

5th Vice President of Palau
- In office January 19, 2001 – January 1, 2005
- President: Tommy Remengesau
- Preceded by: Tommy Remengesau
- Succeeded by: Elias Camsek Chin

Minister of Finance of Palau
- In office January 2001 – January 2002
- President: Thomas Remengesau Jr.
- Preceded by: Thomas Remengesau Jr.
- Succeeded by: Elbuchel Sadang

Minister of Administration of Palau
- In office 1992 – January 1993
- President: Ngiratkel Etpison
- Preceded by: Kuniwo Nakamura
- Succeeded by: Thomas Remengesau Jr.

Personal details
- Born: Sandra Sumang Pierantozzi; 9 August 1953 (age 72) Koror, Trust Territory of the Pacific Islands (present day Palau)
- Spouse: Marcello Pierantozzi

Sandra Sumang Pierantozzi (born 9 August 1953) is a Palauan politician. She served as the country's Vice-President from 19 January 2001 to 1 January 2005. Pierantozzi was defeated by Camsek Chin in the 2 November 2004 vice-presidential election, winning only 28.9% of the vote.

== Career ==
Pierantozzi was born in Palau and holds degrees from San Diego State University, the University of Hawaii and Union College in Lincoln, Nebraska.

She was elected a Senator from 1996 to 2001 and during that time she was the floor leader. In the 2000 vice-presidential elections, she was elected Vice President of Palau. She held this position from January 2001 January 2005.

Pierantozzi also served in a number of appointed ministerial posts. From 1992 to 1993, she was Minister of Administration. From 2001 to 2002, she was Minister of Finance of Palau. From 2001 to 2005, she was Minister of Health. From 2009 to 2010 she was Minister of State, in charge of foreign and domestic affairs and international trade.

She served as Senator for the last 6 months of the vacant seat left by the late Senator Katharine Kesolei, who died in October 2015. The special election in which Sandra Pierantozzi won was held in December 2015.

She serves as honorary consul of the Czech Republic in Palau.

Political offices
Preceded by Thomas Remengesau Jr.	Vice-President of Palau; 2001–2005	Succeeded by Elias Camsek Chin
Preceded by Temmy Shmull	Minister of State of Palau; 2009-2010	Succeeded by Ramon Rechebei
