= Udui =

Udui is a surname. Notable people with the surname include:

- Kaleb Udui (1934–1989), Palauan politician
- Kaleb Udui Jr. (born 1966), Palauan politician
