= Elbuchel Sadang =

Palauan politician

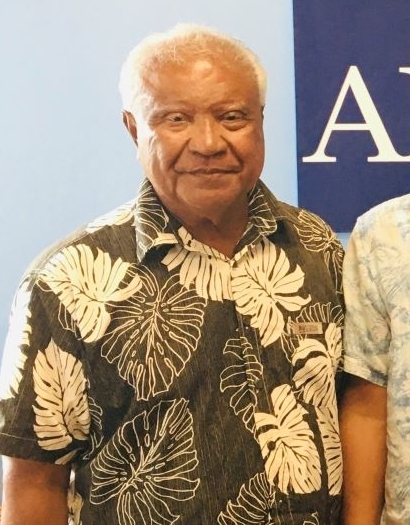

Minister of Finance of Palau
- In office April 2013 – January 2021
- President: Thomas Remengesau Jr.
- Preceded by: Kerai Mariur
- Succeeded by: Kaleb Udui Jr.
- In office January 2002 – January 2009
- President: Thomas Remengesau Jr.
- Preceded by: Sandra Pierantozzi
- Succeeded by: Kerai Mariur

Personal details
- Education: Grand Valley State University

Elbuchel Sadang is a Palauan politician and former Minister of Finance of Palau.

== Career ==
Sadang earned his BS in economics from Grand Valley State University, USA. He was dean of the Micronesian Occupational College from 1985 to 1992.

He is one of the traditional chiefs Ngirameketii from Ngaraard. He was also a member of Ngaraard State legislature. He was the chief of staff of President Remengesau from January 2013 to April 2013.

He was twice appointed by President Remengesau and confirmed by Senate of Palau as Minister of Finance, first from January 2002 to January 2009, and again from April 2013 to January 2021.

From 2014 to 2021, he was the chairman of Micronesia Conservation Trust, a biodiversity conservation trust. Previously, he served as executive director of Palau Conservation Society.
