= Mason Whipps =

Palauan politician

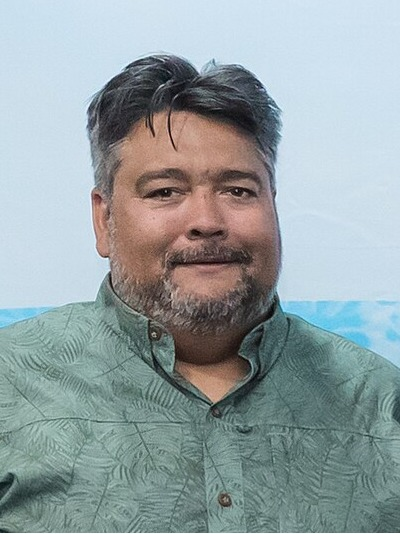
- Whipps in 2024

Member of the Senate of Palau
- Incumbent
- Assumed office January 2013

Personal details
- Born: Palau
- Party: Independent
- Relatives: Surangel Whipps Jr. (brother); Surangel Whipps Sr. (father)
- Occupation: Politician; Businessman

Mason Ngirchechebangel Whipps is a Palauan politician. Whipps was elected to the Senate of Palau in the 2020 Palauan general election.

== Early life and career ==
Whipps has a bachelor's degree in business administration and economics from Walla Walla College in Walla Walla, Washington. He served as the speaker of the Airai State Legislature. He was a member of the Palau Financial Institutions Commission from 2002 to 2008. He is executive vice president of the family business the Ksau's Motors automotive dealership, a subsidiary of the Surangel and Sons Company under his father Surangel Whipps.

Beyond his role at Surangel and Sons, Whipps has held leadership positions in other enterprises. He has served as President of Socio Micronesia Inc. since 2005, and as Chairman and Vice President of Eurasia Pacific Lines since 2010. He was a board member of the Palau Chamber of Commerce from 2009 to 2012.

Whipps was re-elected for a third term in the 2024 Palauan general election, held on 5 November 2024, in which the Senate expanded from 13 to 15 seats following a congressional reapportionment.

== Personal life ==
In April 2026, Whipps's father, Surangel Whipps Sr., died at the age of 86. He had founded Surangel and Sons Company, held the traditional chiefly title of Rekemesik of Ngatpang, and served as president of the Senate of Palau.
