= Regina Mesebeluu =

Palauan educator and politician

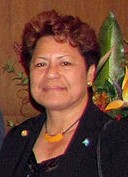
Regina Mesebeluu

Regina Mesebeluu is a Palauan politician who served as a senator in the Palau National Congress between 2008 and 2012.

== Education and teaching career ==
Regina Kyota Mesebeluu married Augustine Mesebeluu, who was a member of the House of Delegates of Palau and the speaker of that body between January 2005 and April 2007. They had three children.

She obtained a Bachelor of Arts in education from Seattle University in 1978 and a master's in education leadership from San Diego State University. She worked for over 20 years in the Ministry of Education, first as a classroom teacher, and later as coordinator and director of various federal programs. Later she was in charge of the Health and Science Curriculum for Palau. Subsequently, she became the director of the Belau Head Start Program, which supports the early childhood education of low-income children and children with disabilities.

== Political career ==
In the 2008 Palauan general election, Regina Mesebeluu came ninth of the 13 senators elected in the common roll vote, joining Katharine Kesolei as the only other women in the senate. In the 2012 election, Kesolei was re-elected but Mesebeluu only came 20th. During her time in the senate she was chair of the senate committee on Health and Education and vice-chair of the committee on Tourism Development. In the 2008 Palauan general election, Regina Mesebeluu came ninth of the 13 senators elected in the common roll vote, joining Katharine Kesolei as the only other women in the senate. In the 2012 election, Kesolei was re-elected but Mesebeluu only came 20th. During her time in the senate she was chair of the senate committee on Health and Education and vice-chair of the committee on Tourism Development.
