= Jennifer Olegeriil =

Minister of Justice of Palau

Minister of Justice
- Incumbent
- Assumed office May 2025
- President: Surangel Whipps Jr.
- Preceded by: Uduch Sengebau Senior

Personal details
- Education: California State University, Chico (BA)

Jennifer Olegeriil is the incumbent Minister of Justice of Palau.

== Biography ==
Olegeriil was nominated for Minister of Justice in April 2025, after the position had been vacant for 4 months. Her two hour confirmation hearing was held in front of the Senate's Judiciary and Governmental Affairs committee in the same month. She required at least ten votes to become Minister, and on May 13 of 2025, it was announced that she received eleven votes for her appointment and three against.

Olegeriil was sworn into office on May 19, 2025, making her the second female Minister for Justice in the country's history. Following her appointment, all of Palau's top law enforcement agencies were led by women, with Ernestine Rengiil being Attorney General, Jennifer Anson being National Security Coordinator, and Tamara Hutzler being Special Prosecutor. Ministers for Justice are usually also the Vice President of Palau, but Olegeriil is the first in over a decade to not simultaneously hold the office of Vice President.

Olegeriil has a Bachelors of Arts Degree in Sociology from California State University, Chico. She also holds a Graduate-Level Diploma in Executive Leadership and Police Management from the Australian Institute of Police Management, where she was one of the first two Micronesians to gain a fellowship.

In 1992, Olegeriil joined the Palau National Police Force, later becoming the first female Deputy Director/Deputy Police Commissioner of the force in 2008. Olegeriil was the Director for the Department of Conservation and Law Enforcement in the Koror State Government. In this position, she was also the site manager of the Koror Rock Islands Southern Lagoon (a UNESCO World Heritage Site) for more than 13 years, and was responsible for managing the security of and enforcing laws concerning climate change, overtourism, overfishing, and other related issues in Palau.

Olergeriil was one of the key speakers at the International Union for Conservation of Nature (IUCN) World Conservation Congress in 2025, which was held in Abu Dhabi, United Arab Emirates.

She has advocated for increased government funding of law enforcement agencies in the Pacific region to address organised crime (such as drug trafficking) on a transnational scale. At the “Leaders on Challenges and Opportunity,” panel at the Pacific Peace and Security Dialogue in Suva, Fiji in 2026, she highlighted the issues of human trafficking, drug trafficking and online exploitation as focal points, and a reason to increase international cooperation between law enforcement in the Pacific region. She also advocates for a holistic approach to the issue, involving addressing gender equity, social inclusion, education and climate change.
