= Kerai Mariur =

Palauan politician

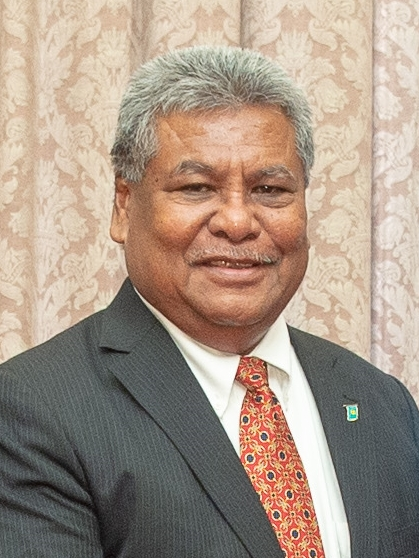
- Mariur in 2018

7th Vice President of Palau
- In office 15 January 2009 – 17 January 2013
- President: Johnson Toribiong
- Preceded by: Elias Camsek Chin
- Succeeded by: Antonio Bells

Minister of Finance of Palau
- In office January 2009 – January 2013
- President: Johnson Toribiong
- Preceded by: Elbuchel Sadang
- Succeeded by: Elbuchel Sadang

Vice President of the Senate of Palau
- In office 21 January 2021 – 16 January 2025
- Succeeded by: Stevenson Kuartei

Floor Leader of the Senate of Palau
- Incumbent
- Assumed office 16 January 2025
- Preceded by: Stevenson Kuartei

Personal details
- Born: 4 June 1951 (age 74) Ollei, Ngarchelong, Palau
- Party: Independent

Kerai Mariur (born 4 June 1951) is a Palauan politician who served as Vice President of Palau from 2009 until 2013.

== Biography ==
Johnson Toribiong selected Mariur to be his nominee for Vice President in the 2008 Palauan election. After winning the election, they were inaugurated on 15 January 2009. Mariur also became Minister of Finance.

He served as vice president of the Senate of Palau before assuming the role of floor leader following the 2024 Palauan general election.

Political offices
Preceded by Elias Camsek Chin	Vice President of Palau; 2009–2013	Succeeded by Antonio Bells
