= Augustine Mesebeluu =

Palauan politician

Speaker of the House of Delegates of Palau
- In office January 2005 – April 2007
- Preceded by: Antonio Bells
- Succeeded by: Antonio Bells

Personal details
- Born: ca. 1952–1954

Augustine Mesebeluu is a Palauan politician and a former speaker of the House of Delegates of Palau.

== Biography ==
Mesebeluu was 55 years old in 2008, so he was born 1952–1954. He graduated from Palau High School in 1973. He graduated with a degree in public administration from the University of Washington in Seattle, in 1977. He returned to Palau in 1977 and worked as a teacher, high school principal and instructor at the Palau Community College.

Mesebeluu's political experience began in 1988 when he was elected to represent the State of Melekeok to the House of Delegates. In 1992, he served as floor leader. He was re-elected in 1992, 1996, 2000 and 2004. He was the elected as speaker of the House of Delegates from January 2005 to April 2007.

He is married to Regina Mesebeluu, who was elected to Senate of Palau for one term from 2008 to 2012.
