= Johnson Toribiong =

Palauan attorney and politician

His Excellency Johnson Toribiong
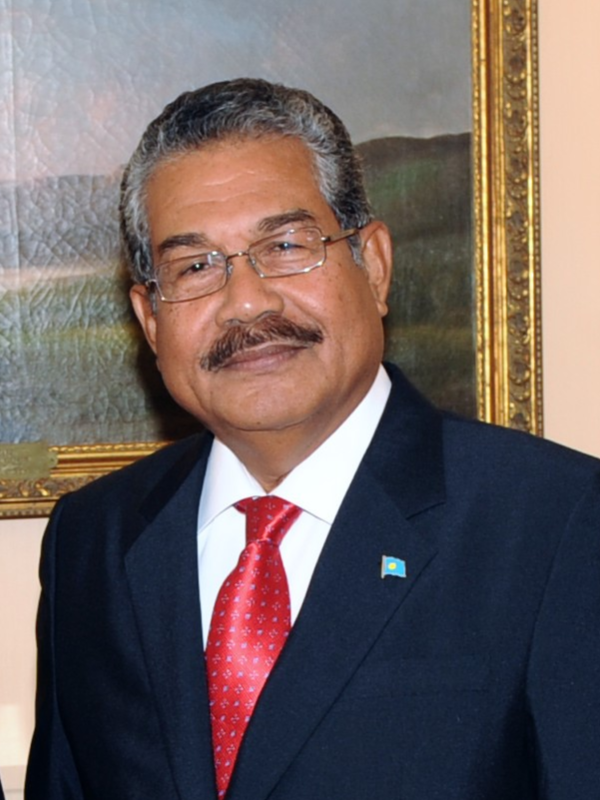
- Toribiong in 2009

8th President of Palau
- In office January 15, 2009 – January 17, 2013
- Vice President: Kerai Mariur
- Preceded by: Tommy Remengesau
- Succeeded by: Tommy Remengesau

1st Palauan Ambassador to Taiwan
- In office October 4, 2001 – December 31, 2008
- President: Tommy Remengesau
- Preceded by: Office established
- Succeeded by: Jackson M. Henry

Personal details
- Born: 22 July 1946 (age 80) Airai, South Pacific Mandate (now Palau)
- Party: Independent
- Spouses: Valeria Toribiong (m. 1976; div. 2023) Christa Nafstad Toribiong (m. 2023)
- Education: University of Colorado (B.A.); University of Washington (J.D., LL.M.)

Johnson Toribiong (born 22 July 1946) is a Palauan attorney and politician who served as president of Palau from 2009 to 2013. He has run for president five times – in 1992, 1996, 2008, 2012, and 2020.

== Early life and background ==
Johnson Toribiong was born July 22, 1946 in Airai. His father was Toribiong Uchel, who became Palau's first Seventh Day Adventist minister. His mother was Ucheliei Malsol. He attended the College of Guam in 1965 and 1966. He transferred from College of Guam to the University of Colorado and earned a B.A. in 1969. He received a J.D. (1972) and an LL.M. (1973) from the University of Washington School of Law. His LL.M. thesis was entitled, "Oil Pollution by Ships and Micronesia: A Survey of Maritime Jurisdiction and Applicable Laws."

After his legal studies, he was employed by the Office of the Trust Territory of the Pacific Attorney General. In 1976, he became a public defender for the TTPI in the Palau and Yap districts. He was the first Palauan and second Micronesian to serve in such a position.

He held the title of Ngiraked of Airai for a period of time.

== Early political career ==
During his early political career, he was aligned with the Liberals, a bloc who favored Palau's independence from Micronesia and the return of the public lands to the control of the Palauan states. In 1980, he served on the Palau Public Lands Authority.

=== Con-Cons ===
For the 1975 Micronesian Con-Con, he campaigned to serve as a delegate from Palau with the assistance of his uncle Roman Tmetuchl. He was the top-vote getter. Additionally, he was a delegate at Palau's first constitutional convention and served as its vice president.

=== District Legislature ===
He was a member of the Palau District Legislature and chaired its Special Committee on the Palau Port Authority. In this capacity, he was supportive of a proposed petroleum transshipment port sought by Japan to ensure its ability to get oil.

=== Senate of Palau ===
He was elected to the Senate of Palau as one of seven senators from Koror in the 1980 election. On January 12, 1981, he was elected the floor leader over John Tarkong Sr. He served in the Senate until 1985. He was an unsuccessful candidate for reelection in 1984. After reapportionment, he ran in the 2nd district for one of three seats. He lost to Isidoro Rudimch and newcomers Nicholas Rechebei and Sam Masang.

== 1992 and 1996 presidential campaigns ==
Toribiong ran for President of Palau in the 1992 election. In the primary, Toribiong defeated outgoing vice president Kuniwo Nakamura by fifty-three votes while the incumbent Ngiratkel Etpison finished in third place. In the runoff, Toribiong had the endorsement of twelve of sixteen state governors. In the runoff election, Nakamura defeated Toribiong by a margin of 134 votes.

He ran again for President in the 1996 general election with Kione Isechal as his running mate under the banner of the Palau Nationalist Party. Toribiong underperformed his 1992 performance and finished in second place to incumbent Kuniwo Nakamura while Isechal lost the vice presidential race outright to Thomas Remengesau Jr.. Toribiong dropped out of the runoff election citing the need for Nakamura and the government's full attention to be directed to the collapse of the Koror-Babeldaob Bridge.

== Ambassador to Taiwan ==
In 2001, Toribiong was appointed to serve as the Palauan ambassador to the Republic of China. He was Palau's first ambassador to the Republic. He served as Palau's ambassador until 2008.

While ambassador, he was also elected a delegate to the Second Constitutional Convention and was the top vote getter of the 34 candidates vying for 9 at-large delegate positions. The delegates then elected him the con-con's president.

== Presidency ==
A constitutional initiative passed in the 2004 election required, for the first time, that candidates run as a team. In the primary election, Vice President Elias Chin and Senator Alan Seid finished first with 3,027 votes while Toribiong and his vice presidential candidate Delegate Kerai Mariur took 2,526 votes. Senate president Surangel Whipps, Jr. and Billy Kuartei finished third with 2,248 votes and Senator Joshua Koshiba and Peleliu Governor Jackson Ngiraingas finished fourth with 1,387 votes. In the runoff election, Toribiong and Mariur were victorious with 5,040 votes to Chin-Seid's 4,828. Toribiong and Mariur were inaugurated on January 15, 2009.

In 2009, the Republic of Palau created the world's first shark sanctuary. It is illegal to catch sharks within Palau's EEZ, which covers an area of 230,000 square miles (600,000 km^{2}). This is an area about the size of France. President Johnson Toribiong also called for a ban on global shark finning, stating: "These creatures are being slaughtered and are perhaps at the brink of extinction unless we take positive action to protect them." He accepted six Uyghur former prisoners from the Guantanamo Bay detention camp, which became controversial due to their inability to assimilate into Palauan society.

In 2012, Toribiong was challenged for reelection by his predecessor, Tommy Remengesau Jr. and by former vice president Sandra Pierantozzi. In the runoff, Remengesau defeated Toribiong 58%-42%. Toribiong left office on January 17, 2013.

== Post-presidency ==
He again ran for president in the 2020 general election on a platform of reforming foreign investment law and increasing private sector participation by Palauans. He finished in a distant third of four candidates to Raynold Oilouch and eventual winner Surangel Whipps Jr..

In 2023, he married Christa Nafstad, a former assistant attorney general for Palau. Shortly after, the two sued Surangel Whipps in both the Palauan and the US federal court system over her inclusion on a blacklist of "undesirable aliens". In 2024, Radio New Zealand and Marianas Variety reported that Christa Nafstad filed for divorce.

Political offices
| Preceded by Tommy Remengesau | President of Palau; 2009–2013 | Succeeded by Tommy Remengesau |
