= Alan R. Seid =

Palauan businessman and politician

Alan Rechuldak Seid (born June 9, 1957) is a Palauan businessman and politician of partially American Jewish origin. He was elected into House of Delegates of Palau from 1989 until 2000. He was a senator in the Senate of Palau from 2005 to 2009 In the 2008 presidential election he was the running mate of Elias Camsek Chin.

He ran for president in the 2020 presidential elections.

== Notes ==
- Biography at senate website
