= Ignacio Anastacio =

Palauan politician (1951/1952–2026)

Speaker of the House of Delegates of Palau
- In office January 1997 – November 2000
- Preceded by: Surangel S. Whipps
- Succeeded by: Mario S. Gulibert

Personal details
- Born: 1951 or 1952
- Died: 29 August 2026 Philippines
- Relatives: Sabino Anastacio (brother)

Ignacio Anastacio (1951 or 1952 – 29 August 2026) was a Palauan businessman and politician who served as speaker of the House of Delegates of Palau from January 1997 to November 2000.

== Life and career ==
Anastacio was 29 years old in 1981, so he was born in 1951 or 1952.

In 1980, Anastacio was elected to House of Delegates of Palau, representing the State of Ngchesar. He was re-elected in 1984, and by 1990 he was the floor leader of the House of Delegates.

He held traditional chief title Rechesengel in Ngchesar state. He was a brother of Sabino Anastacio. Ignacio Anastacio died in the Philippines on 29 August 2026.
