= Kaleb Udui Jr. =

Palauan politician

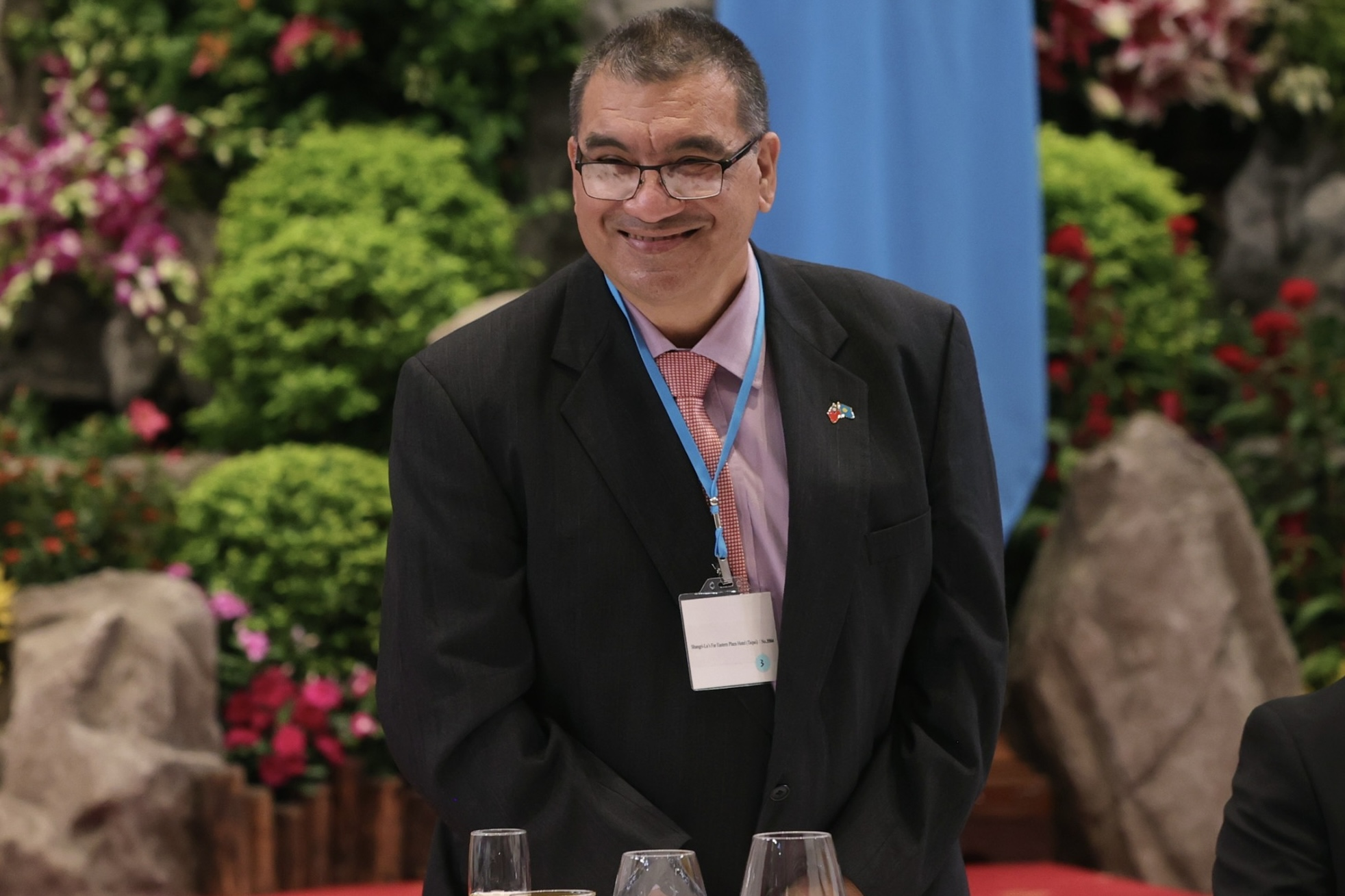
- Udui in 2022

Minister of Finance of Palau
- In office 8 February 2021 – January 2025
- President: Surangel Whipps Jr.
- Preceded by: Elbuchel Sadang

Personal details
- Born: 3 March 1966 (age 60)
- Parent: Kaleb Udui (father)

Kaleb Udui Jr. (born 3 March 1966) is a Palauan civil servant and politician, and current Minister of Finance of Palau since February 2021.

== Career ==
He was born on 3 March 1966 in Ngaraard. Udui has a bachelor's degree in finance and economics from the University of Guam and a Master of Business Administration from the Shidler College of Business at the University of Hawaiʻi at Mānoa.

He began public as a chief of the division in the Ministry of Finance in early 1990s. In the late 1990s, he served as the financial advisor to the Ministry. In the 2000s, Udui worked in banking, including as the president of the National Development Bank of Palau from January 2004 to 2010s. He was also board member of Tonga Financial Services Authority from 2002 to 2011. Udui was appointed by Surangel Whipps Jr. as Minister of Finance, and was confirmed by the Senate of Palau. Surangel Whipps Jr. appointed him as Minister of Finance for a second term in January 2025, but the appointment was not confirmed by the Senate.

His private business activities in Palau include banking, energy consulting and in real estate. He is the son of Kaleb Udui, former Palau politician, President of the Senate, and governor of Ngaraard.
