= List of ambassadors of Palau to Taiwan =

Coordinates: 25.117288°N 121.524125°E

Ambassador of Palau to Taiwan
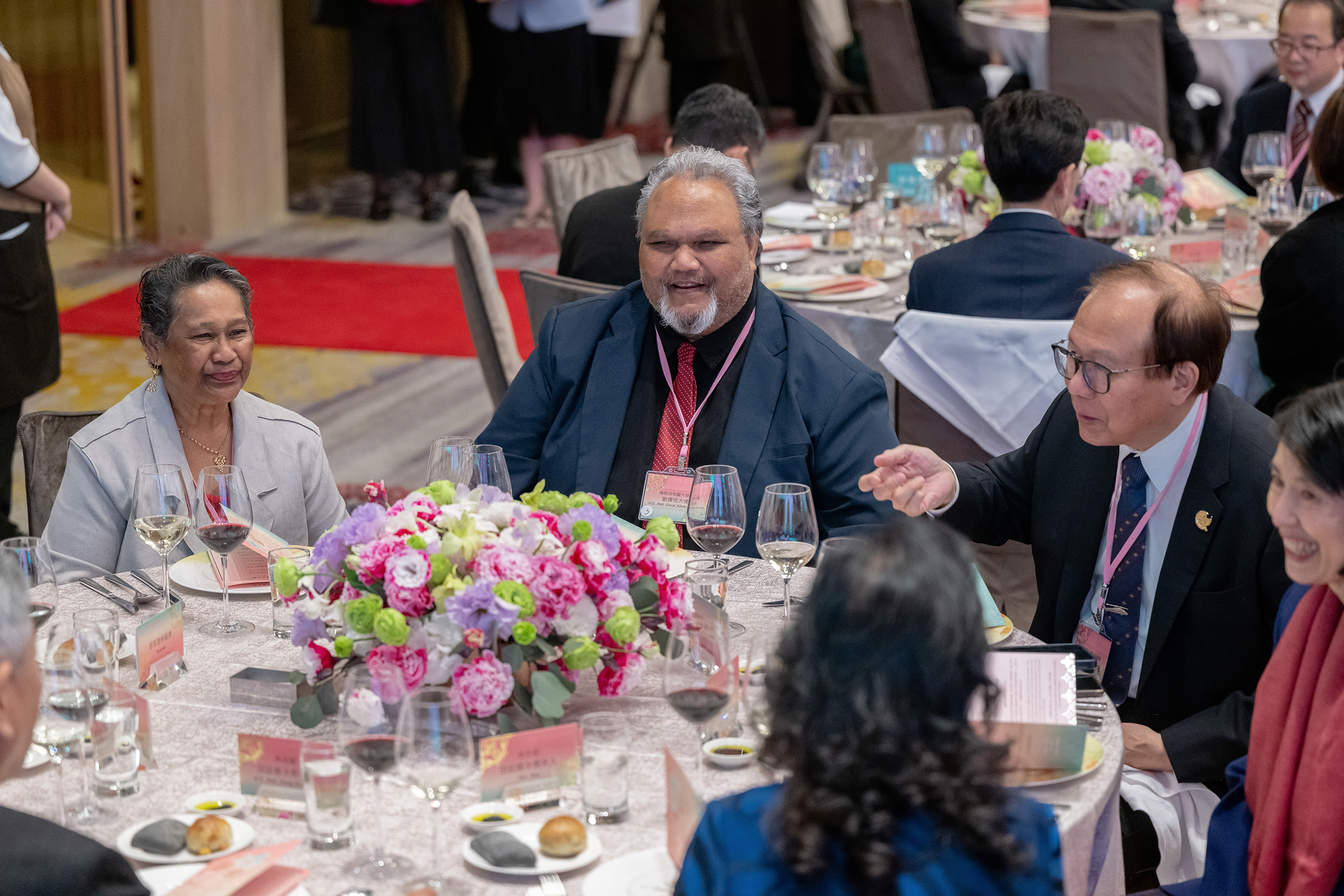
- Incumbent; David Orrukem since 2022
- Inaugural holder: Johnson Toribiong
- Formation: October 4, 2001

The Palauan ambassador in Taipei is the official representative of the government in Ngerulmud to the government of Taiwan.

== List of representatives ==
Diplomatic agrément/Diplomatic accreditation	Ambassador	Observations	President of Palau	List of premiers of the Republic of China	Term end
October 4, 2001	Johnson Toribiong		Tommy Remengesau	Tang Fei	December 31, 2008
July 1, 2009	Jackson M. Henry	In 2010, Jackson Henry the previous Palau Ambassador to Taiwan resigned,	Tommy Remengesau	Wu Den-yih	2010
2010	Jon Marvin Ngirutang	Chargé d'affaires	Johnson Toribiong	Wu Den-yih	2011
August 24, 2012	Peter Remedy Adelbai	(* July 24, 1959 in Koror, Palau): Education: University of Guam; Parents Adelbai Remed and Irachel S. Adelbai.; deg: BA, Liberal Arts, Polit Sei, 1984; act: Student Body Assn, VP, Sen Three Yrs.; Palauan Student Org VP, Rep Two Yrs;	Johnson Toribiong	Sean Chen (politician)	February 28, 2013
June 1, 2014	Dilmei Louisa Olkeriil		Tommy Remengesau	Jiang Yi-huah	August 2022
September 1, 2022 / October 4, 2022	David Orrukem	First charge d'affairs to the United States	Surangel Whipps Jr.	Su Tseng-chang	present
