= 1981 in Palau =

- Decades: 1970s; 1980s; 1990s; 2000s
- See also: Other events of 1981; Timeline of Palauan history

The following lists events that happened during 1981 in the Republic of Palau.

== Events ==
- 1 January – Palau was proclaimed in the Palau Islands of Micronesia.
- 2 March - Haruo Remeliik takes office as the first President of Palau
- 18 August - Palau Congressional Library was established.
