= Ksau's Motors =

Car dealer company

Coordinates: 7°21′46″N 134°30′39″E

- Company type: Private
- Industry: Car dealership
- Predecessor: Surangel's Automotive
- Headquarters: Ngetkib, Airai, Republic of Palau
- Number of locations: 2
- Area served: Republic of Palau
- Key people: Surangel S. Whipps (owner); Eric Ksau Whipps (President, CEO); Mason Whipps (Executive Vice President, COO); Samberline Recheluul (Shop Manager)
- Products: New & Used Cars, Parts and Service
- Number of employees: 20
- Parent: Surangel and Sons Company
- Website: https://surangel.com/ksausmotors/

Ksau's Motors is a division of Surangel and Sons Company in Palau. The company is the first Toyota car dealer in the Republic of Palau.

Ksau's Motors is planning to open a supercenter in Airai, the largest city in the second most populous state in Palau in February 2022. Ksau's Motors signed an agreement with Atkins Kroll, the Toyota distributor for Guam and Micronesia.

== History ==
Surangel and Sons Company, the parent company of Ksau's Motors, was founded in 1980 by Surangel Whipps, Sr. who was a legislator in the House of Delegates (of Palau) for 16 years, part of that tenure serving as Speaker Eric Ksau Whipps is the CEO of Surangel and Sons Company.

== Corporate Plans ==
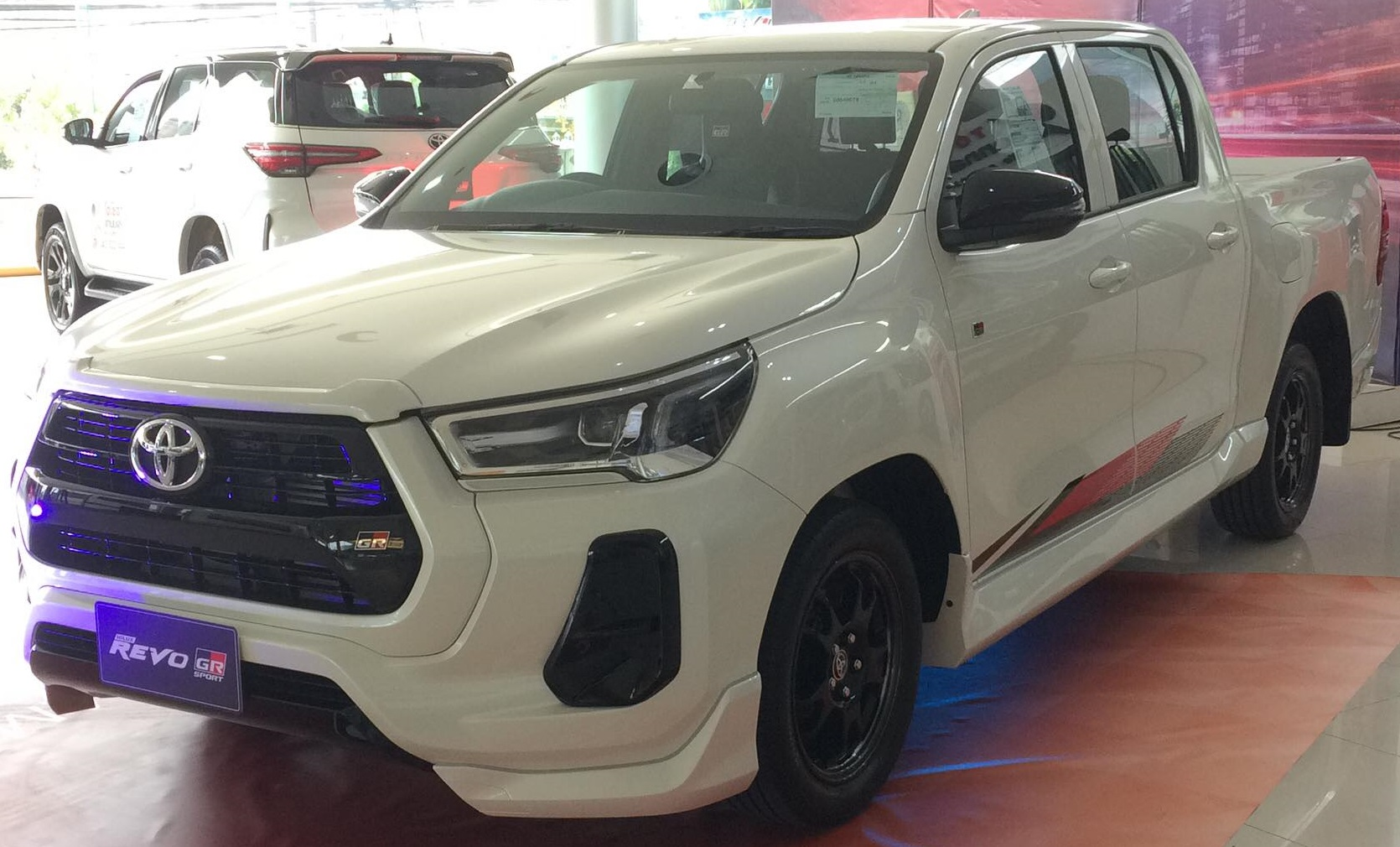
Toyota Hilux

Ksau's Motors plans to initially sell the Toyota Hilux and later expand to other Toyota models. The model is cited as having reliability and is suited for road conditions in Palau.
