= Seit Andres =

Palauan politician

President of the Senate of Palau
- In office September 1999 – December 2004
- Preceded by: Isidoro Rudimch
- Succeeded by: Surangel S. Whipps

Seit Andres is a Palauan politician and President of the Senate of Palau from September 1999 to December 2004.

Andres was born on 4 May in Melekeok. He graduated from Xavier High School in Truk. He has an arts degree and a degree in economics from the University of Hawaiʻi at Mānoa.

Andres worked in Palau Community Action Agency and as an administrative assistant for the Palau Port Authority. In the administration of President Lazarus Salii, he served as the chairman of an advisory task force on Compact of Free Association. He was an advisor to the Melekeok State constitutional convention, and he served in the Melekeok State legislature and the Melekeok State Lands Authority from 1992 to 2000.

In the elections of 1980, Andres was elected as a senator to the first Palau National Congress. He was re-elected multiple times, and represented the State of Melekeok. He was also elected as the floor leader in the Senate. After the death of Senate President Isidoro Rudimch, Andres was elected as Senate President in September 1999. He served as Senate President until the 2004 elections. He was not re-elected in the 2008 elections.

Andres holds traditional title 'Sechalruleong' in Melekeok. He has been the honorary consul of Russia in Palau.
