= Stevenson Kuartei =

Stevenson J. Kuartei
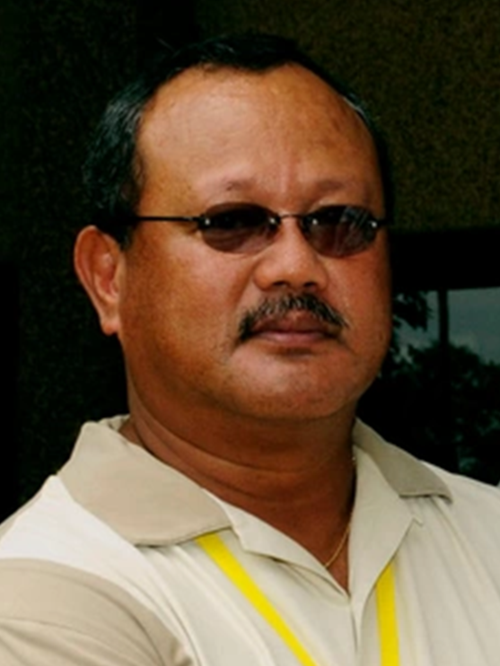
- Kuartei in 2010

Stevenson J. Kuartei is a medical doctor and politician from Palau. As of 2026, he is the Vice President of the Senate of Palau.

== Early life and medical career ==
Stevenson J. Kuartei was born and raised in Palau. He graduated from Asbury University and the John A. Burns School of Medicine at the University of Hawaiʻi at Mānoa. He trained in family medicine at University of California, Irvine School of Medicine. He received a post-graduate certificate in public health from the Fiji School of Medicine and completed a fellowship in integrative medicine at the University of Arizona Medical Center. He became the Director of Public Health for Palau. In 2009, President Johnson Toribiong appointed Kuartei a member of his cabinet as the Minister of Health. While minister, he served as president of the Pacific Island Health Officers Association.

== Political career ==
In 2004, Stevenson Kuartei was elected as a delegate to the 2004 Palau Constitutional Convention. The delegates in turn elected Kuartei as one of the convention's vice presidents. He served as the Palauan Minister of Health. He was one of four candidates for vice president in the 2012 general election. He finished third and did not advance to the runoff election. He was first elected to the Palauan Senate in 2016. After his reelection in 2024, Kuartei was named the Vice President of the Palau Senate for the 12th Olbiil era Kelulau as well as chairman of the senate's health committee.

== Selected works ==
Stevenson Kuartei is a published author with a focus on the healthcare systems of various Pacific islands.

- Ichiho HM, Demei Y, Kuartei S, Aitaoto N. (2013). "An assessment of non-communicable diseases, diabetes, and related risk factors in the Republic of Palau: a systems perspective." Hawaiʻi Journal of Medicine & Public Health.
- Melhem N, Middleton F, McFadden K, Klei L, Faraone SV, Vinogradov S, Tiobech J, Yano V, Kuartei S, Roeder K, Byerley W, Devlin B, Myles-Worsley M. (2011). "Copy number variants for schizophrenia and related psychotic disorders in Oceanic Palau: risk and transmission in extended pedigrees." Biological Psychiatry.
- Nakayama K, Yanagisawa Y, Ogawa A, Ishizuka Y, Munkhtulga L, Charupoonphol P, Supannnatas S, Kuartei S, Chimedregzen U, Koda Y, Ishida T, Kagawa Y, Iwamoto S. (2011). "High prevalence of an anti-hypertriglyceridemic variant of the MLXIPL gene in Central Asia." Journal of Human Genetics.
- Hosey G, Ichiho H, Satterfield D, Dankwa-Mullan I, Kuartei S, Rhee K, Belyeu-Camacho T, deBrum I, Demei Y, Lippwe K, Luces PS, Roby F. (2011). "Chronic disease surveillance systems within the US Associated Pacific Island jurisdictions." Preventing Chronic Disease.
- Madraisau S, Tomoichi U, Ord LM, Florsheim P, Phillips LJ, Blailes F, Basilius M, Kuartei S, Tiobech J, Myles-Worsley M, Ngiralmau H. (2010). "Early signs and symptoms of psychosis among Palauan adolescents." Early Intervention in Psychiatry.
- Ierago L, Malsol C, Singeo T, Kishigawa Y, Blailes F, Ord L, Florsheim P, Phillips L, Kuartei S, Tiobech J, Watson B, Ngiralmau H. (2010). "Adoption, family relations and psychotic symptoms among Palauan adolescents who are genetically at risk for developing schizophrenia." Social Psychiatry and Psychiatric Epidemiology.
- Yanagisawa Y, Munkhtulga L, Nakayama K, Iwamoto S, Charupoonphol P, Supannnatas S, Kuartei S, Chimedregzen U, Kawabata T, Kaneko Y, Watanabe S, Sakuma M, Komatsu F, Hasegawa K, Kagawa Y. (2008). "Diversity in genes responsible for lifestyle-related diseases in Asia-Pacific region." Asia-Pacific Journal of Public Health.
- Kuartei S. (2005). "Health care plans and dust collection in the Pacific." Pacific Health Dialog.
- Carter K, Chan J, Kuartei S, Alvarez J. (2005). "Disease surveillance during the VII South Pacific Mini Games, Palau 2005--lessons learnt." Pacific Health Dialog.
- Kuartei SJ. (2005). "On testifying at Senate Confirmation Hearings for a new Minister of Health for Palau--where are we going in health?" Pacific Health Dialog.
- Durand AM, Decherong K, Ngirasowei J, Bechesrrak Y, Malsol S, Osarch S, Marcil A, Kuartei S, Dever G. (2005). "The use of appropriateness criteria for the selection of clinical preventive services for a Pacific island health service." Pacific Health Dialog.
- Dever G, Finau S, Kuartei S, Durand AM, Rykken D, Yano V, Untalan P, Withy K, Tellei P, Baravilala W, Pierantozzi S, Tellei J. (2005). "The Palau AHEC--academizing the public health work plan: capacity development and innovation in Micronesia." Pacific Health Dialog.
- Kuartei S. (2005). "Environment and expression of the thrifty genes." Pacific Health Dialog.
- Rykken D, Heiderscheidt P, Dever G, Kuartei S, Maramoto P. (2005). "Palau's current and future capacity for disaster management." Pacific Health Dialog.
- Sengebau-Kingzio JM, Ridep E, Dever GJ, Kuartei SJ, Finau SA. (2005). "Human resource development in environmental health for Palau--a model program for Micronesia and the Pacific." Pacific Health Dialog.
- Kuartei S. (2005). "Environmental sacredness and health in Palau." Pacific Health Dialog.
- Kuartei S. (2005). "Incest in Palau: 'Delemumuu undressed'." Pacific Health Dialog.
- Kuartei S. (2005). "Era of globalization, emerging and re-emerging diseases and the increasing burden of non-communicable diseases." Pacific Health Dialog.
- Yano V, Ueda M, Tellei J, Wally W, Kuartei S, Tokon W, Lalabalavu S, Otto C, Pierantozzi S, Dever G, Finau S. (2006). "The Pacific Center for Emergency Health--an anatomy of collaborative development and change--the Palau perspective." Pacific Health Dialog.
- Kuartei S. (2006). "Managing health care system in small island countries: Palau." Pacific Health Dialog.
- Chen TH, Dever G, Kuartei S, Maskarinec GG. (2007). "Palau assessment for a continuing health care professional development program." Pacific Health Dialog.
- Vogt TM, Goldstein ST, Kuartei S. (2006). "Endemic hepatitis B virus infection and chronic liver disease mortality in the Republic of Palau, 1990-2002." Transactions of the Royal Society of Tropical Medicine and Hygiene.
- Demma LJ, McQuiston JH, Nicholson WL, Murphy SM, Marumoto P, Sengebau-Kingzio M, Kuartei S, Durand AM, Swerdlow DL. (2006). "Scrub typhus, Republic of Palau." Emerging Infectious Diseases.
- Wong V, Taoka S, Kuartei S, Demei Y, Soaladaob F. (2004). "Cancer in the Republic of Palau (Belau)." Pacific Health Dialog.
- Durand AM, Kuartei S, Togamae I, Sengebau M, Demma L, Nicholson W, O'Leary M. (2004). "Scrub typhus in the Republic of Palau, Micronesia." Emerging Infectious Diseases.
- Dever G, Finau SA, McCormick R, Kuartei S, Withy K, Yano V, Palafox N, Ueda M, Pierantozzi S, Pretrick E, Ngaden V, Durand AM. (2002). "In-country and community-based postgraduate family practice training for Micronesian physicians--the Palau AHEC: a collaborative effort." Pacific Health Dialog.
- Yano V, Ueda M, Dever G, Tellei J, Wally W, Kuartei S, Tokon W, Lalabalavu S, Otto C, Pierantozzi S. (2002). "The Pacific Center for Emergency Health: an anatomy of collaborative development and change--the Palau perspective." Pacific Health Dialog.
