= Mark Rudimch =

Palauan politician

Mark Rudimch

Mark Ucherbelau Rudimch is a Palauan businessman and politician and current member of the Senate of Palau.

He is an entrepreneur and businessman. He has been a senator since January 2009, elected to the Senate of Palau in the 2008 elections, and has been re-elected since. He has been Vice President of the Senate. He was also elected to the second Palauan constitutional convention.

He is a son of Isidoro Rudimch.
