= Johnny Reklai =

Palauan politician

President of the Senate of Palau
- In office April 2005 – 11 March 2007
- Preceded by: Surangel S. Whipps
- Succeeded by: Joshua Koshiba

Personal details
- Born: 1 July 1948
- Died: 11 March 2007 (aged 58)

Johnny Reklai (1 July 1948 – 11 March 2007) was a Palauan businessman and politician.

== Biography ==
He was elected as the President of the Senate of Palau in April 2005.

He died in a boating accident. At the time of his death he was serving as the President of the Senate of Palau. He was succeeded in that office by Surangel S. Whipps, and his seat was filled by Hokkons Baules.

He attended the University of Guam. He was first elected to the House of Delegates of Palau in 1980.
