= Adalbert Eledui =

Palauan politician

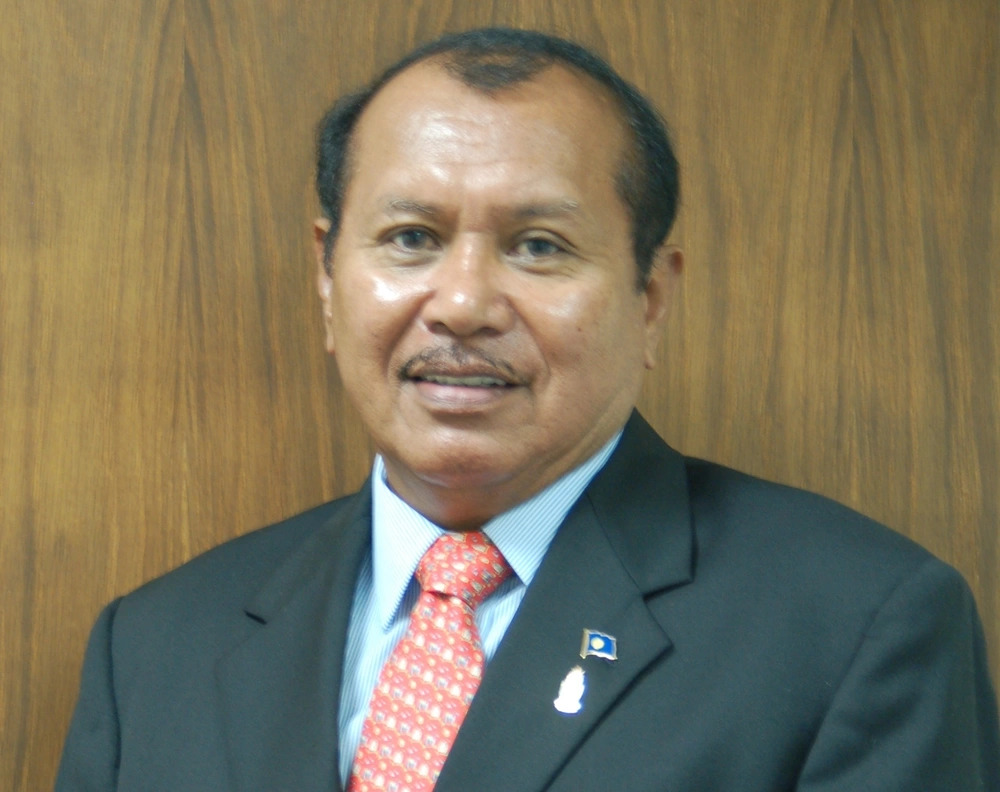
Eledui in 2009

Adalbert Eledui (1948 – December 14, 2010) was a member of the Senate of Palau until his death in office. He was a sergeant major and served in the United States Army for 23 years. He was a founding member of the Palau Conservation Society and as a senator in congress helped establish the Coral Reef Research Center.
