= Elias Camsek Chin =

Palauan politician

- 陳嵌薩
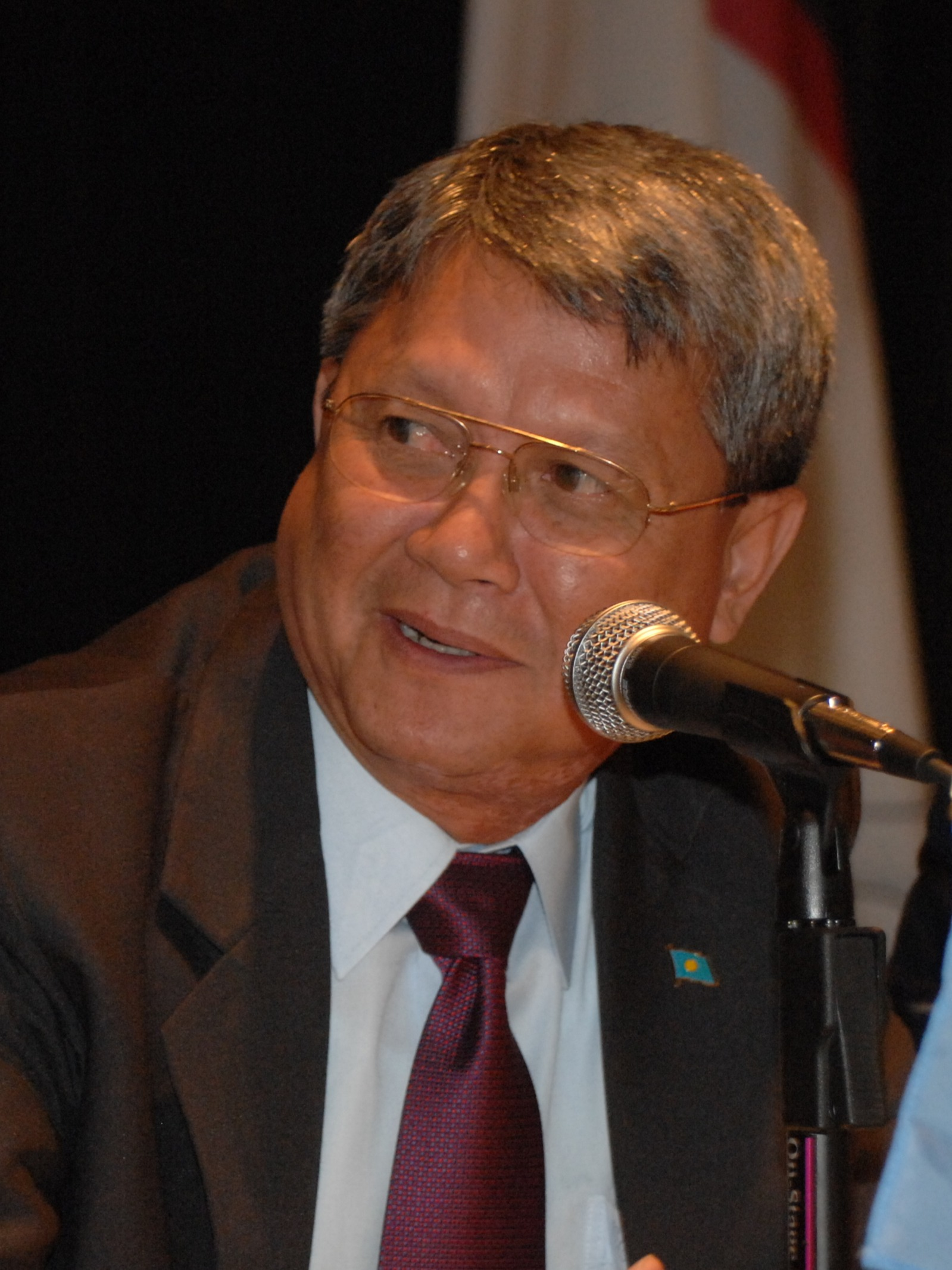
- Chin at 2008 Insular Areas Health Summit

President of the Senate of Palau
- In office 16 January 2013 – 19 January 2017
- Preceded by: Mlib Tmetuchl
- Succeeded by: Hokkons Baules

6th Vice President of Palau
- In office January 1, 2005 – January 15, 2009
- President: Tommy Remengesau
- Preceded by: Sandra Pierantozzi
- Succeeded by: Kerai Mariur

Justice Minister of Palau
- In office 1997 – 1 January 2001
- President: Kuniwo Nakamura
- Preceded by: Salvador Ingereklii
- Succeeded by: Michael J. Rosenthal
- In office 2004 – 15 January 2009
- President: Thomas Remengesau Jr.
- Preceded by: Michael J. Rosenthal
- Succeeded by: John C. Gibbons

Personal details
- Born: 11 October 1948 (age 77) Peleliu, Palau
- Spouse: Miriam Chin
- Children: 2

Elias Camsek Chin (Chinese: 陳嵌薩: born 11 October 1948) is a Palauan politician. He served as the Vice President of Palau from 1 January 2005 to 15 January 2009. He was elected as the president of the Senate of Palau from 16 January 2013 to 19 January 2017.

== Early life ==
Elias Camsek Chin was born in Peleliu, Palau, on October 11, 1948. His father, Taktai Chin, was the son of a Chinese miner at Angaur and a Palauan mother, and became Palau's first doctor. His mother, Takeko Chin (née Kuratomi) was of Japanese heritage.

As a youth, Camsek attended Farrington High School in Honolulu, Hawaii. While attending University of Hawaii, Camsek met Miriam Rudimch. Camsek learned that Miriam was a tennis player and, in an attempt to impress Ms. Rudimch, decided to take on the sport (even though he initially found the sport to be boring and preferred to spend his days surfing Hawaii 's famous breaks). This time, however, Cowboy was picked first: Miriam Rudimch and Camsek Chin married on May 21, 1977.

Elias Camsek Chin attended the Electronic Institute of Hawaii, graduating with an AA degree in electronics engineering technology. He earned a Bachelor of Arts degree in psychology from the University of Hawaii at Manoa, where he also completed the Reserve Officer Training Corps Curriculum and Education course of Study. In 1975 Second Lieutenant Chin was commissioned in the Armor Corps of the U.S. Army. He later branch transferred to Aviation Corps and spent over 20 years as a U.S. Army combat aviator.

== Military career ==
Lieutenant Colonel Chin is a graduate of the Armor Officer Basic and Advanced Course, United States Army Flight School, Air Ground Operations School, the United States Army Command and General Staff College, and the U.S. Army War College with emphasis on international relations. He is also a graduate of U.S. Army Airborne School, U.S. Army Ranger School, U.S. Army Motor Officer School, and the U.S. Army Computer School.

His awards and decorations include the Legion of Merits, the Meritorious Service Medal with 2nd Oak Leaf Cluster, the Army Commendation Medal with 2nd Oak Leaf Cluster, the Army Achievement Medal with Oak Leaf Cluster, the National Defense Service Medal, Army Service Ribbon, Overseas Ribbon, Parachutist Badge, Army Master Aviator Badge and the Ranger Tab.

Upon Lieutenant Colonel Chin's retirement from the U.S. Army in 1997, President Kuniwo Nakamura nominated him to the position of Minister of Justice. The Fifth Olbiil Era Kelulau unanimously approved.

== Family life ==
Chin and his wife, Miriam, have two children, Lalii Antolina, an attorney, and Nathan Lee Beches, a University of Washington graduate and medical school applicant.

== Politics ==
Chin served as Minister of Justice for a three-year tenure from 1997 to 2000, and he initiated and completed a number of projects for the Ministry and the community of Palau . He designed and built the three-story BRT Building that now houses the Ministry of Justice Office and the Bureau of Public Safety Administration, using his own Ministry's operating funds and utilizing prisoners as construction workers to minimize costs.

Through an arrangement with Chief Rengulbai and the Governor of Aimeliik, Minister Chin turned a plot of land in Nekken into a successful Sublek Farm run by prisoners. Harvests of vegetables, fruit and root crops and meat from the piggery and poultry farm supplemented the prison menus. And the prisoners learned valuable lessons and skills for the future. Produce from the farm was also shared with Aimeliik Elementary School and the national hospital.

Minister Chin initiated an alternative juvenile justice program called Omengull ma Okurullel a Klechad, popularly dubbed Double OK, by enlisting traditional leaders, state governors and parents as partners to serve as mentors and guidance counselors to the young offenders on the Palauan traditional values and disciplines. He acquired a grant and, using prisoners again as workers, built buoys with solar lights around the islands of Babeldaob, Koror and Peleliu

In his private life following his term as Minister of Justice, he dedicated his time to designing, building and fundraising for the construction of Father Felix Yaoch Gymnasium. In November 2000, Mr. Chin was elected as a senator to the Sixth Olbiil Era Kelulau (Palau National Congress).

On 2 November 2004, the people overwhelmingly elected Chin Vice President of Palau. Chin defeated incumbent Sandra Pierantozzi in vice-presidential elections held on 2 November 2004, winning 71.1% of the vote. President Thomas Remengesau Jr. temporarily appointed him to the vacant portfolio of Minister of Justice.

In the 2008 election on 4 November 2008, Chin ran for the presidency, but was defeated in the second round, winning 49 per cent of the vote. Johnson Toribiong was elected president with 51 per cent.

== Bibliography ==
- Crocombe, R. G., Asia in the Pacific Islands: Replacing the West, 2007, ISBN 982-02-0388-0

Political offices
| Preceded by Michael J. Rosenthal | Justice Minister of Palau; 2004-2008 | Succeeded by John C. Gibbons |
| Preceded by Sandra Pierantozzi | Vice-President of Palau; 2005–2009 | Succeeded by Kerai Mariur |
