= Imeong Conservation Area =

Coordinates: 7.0600°N 134.5286°E

- Location: Palau
- Area: 1,250 ha (4.8 sq mi)

The Imeong Conservation Area is an area of roughly 1,250 sq m located in western Palau.

== Site Description ==
The area includes multiple ecosystems types including rain forest, savanna, and mangrove wetlands. It also contains the island's highest points that create important drainage systems for the western part of the island. Not solely proposed to protect the natural wonders of the area, the Imeong Conservation will also strive to protect the important surrounding cultural sites. These sites include the Ii ra Milad sacred rock shelter, which is widely known as the most sacred site in all of Palau, and the Ngerutechei traditional Palauan village.

== World Heritage Status ==
This site was added to the UNESCO World Heritage Tentative List on August 26, 2004, in the Mixed (Cultural + Natural) category.
