= Kaleb Udui =

Palauan politician

President of the Senate of Palau
- In office January 1981 – November 1984
- Preceded by: New office
- Succeeded by: Isidoro Rudimch

Personal details
- Born: 27 September 1934
- Died: 20 August 1989 (aged 54)
- Spouse: Elizabeth Udui

Kaleb Udui (27 September 1934 – 20 August 1989) was a Palauan politician and attorney who was the first President of the Senate of Palau.

He was born 27 September 1934 in Ngaraard. He was the first Micronesian lawyer ever graduated from a law school, namely George Washington University Law School. He served as legislative counsel to the Congress of Micronesia from 1965 to 1976.

In the 1976 elections he was elected as a senator from Palau district to the Congress of Micronesia for the term 1976–1978. He was then elected as a member of Palau legislature from 1978 to 1979. In the 1980 elections he was elected to new Senate of Palau, and in January 1981 he was elected as the first President of the Senate. He served until the 1984 elections. Then he served as governor of his native state of Ngaraard until his death. He died on Sunday 20 August 1989 in Koror. A state of national mourning was declared upon his passing.

He was married to Elizabeth Udui. He was the father of Kaleb Udui Jr..
