= Surangel S. Whipps =

Palauan businessman and politician (1941–2026)

President of the Senate of Palau
- In office 25 April 2007 – 15 January 2009
- Preceded by: Joshua Koshiba
- Succeeded by: Mlib Tmetuchl
- In office January 2005 – April 2005
- Preceded by: Seit Andres
- Succeeded by: Johnny Reklai

Speaker of the House of Delegates of Palau
- In office 28 January 1993 – November 1996
- Preceded by: Shiro Kyota
- Succeeded by: Ignacio Anastacio

Personal details
- Born: Surangel Ngirchechebangel Whipps; 21 February 1941 Airai, Palau
- Died: April 22, 2026 (aged 85)
- Spouse: Marilyn Whipps (m. 1965)
- Children: 4, including Surangel Jr. and Mason
- Occupation: Politician, businessman

Surangel Samuel Whipps Sr. (February 21, 1941 ― April 22, 2026) was a Palauan businessman and politician. He served as the president of the Senate of Palau from January 2005 to April 2005, and from 25 April 2007 to 15 January 2009, and as the speaker of the House of Delegates of Palau from January 1993 to November 1996. He was born in Airai.

He graduated from University of Baltimore in 1971 and returned to Palau in 1972. He began his political career in 1982 when he was elected in his home state, Ngatpang. In 1984, he was elected by to the House of Delegates of Palau in the Second Olbiil Era Kelulau. He served 16 years in the House of Delegates. He also founded Surangel and Sons Company, of which Ksau's Motors, the only Toyota dealer in Palau, is owned by the company. He was the Rekemesik of Ngatpang.

== Politics ==
In January 2008, Whipps proposed a bill requiring the minimum wage to apply not just to Palauans, but to non-resident workers as well. It was reasoned that this would help more Palauans to become employed, due to the increased cost of hiring non-resident workers.

== Personal life and death ==
Whipps was a member of the Seventh-day Adventist Church. Following the DePaiva family murders in December 2003, Whipps took part in the funerals in Palau and in the United States, expressing sorrow and apologies on behalf of Palauans over the crimes.

He died on April 24, 2026.
