= Public holidays in Palau =

This is a list of holidays in Palau.

== List ==
2018
Date	English name
1 January	New Year's Day
15 March	Youth Day
5 May	Senior Citizens Day
1 June	President's Day
9 July	Constitution Day
First Monday in September	Labour Day
1 October	Independence Day
24 October	United Nations Day
Fourth Thursday in November	Thanksgiving Day
Fourth Friday in November	Family Day
25 December	Christmas Day
