= Joshua Koshiba =

Palauan politician

President of the Senate of Palau
- In office 27 March 2007 – 25 April 2007
- Preceded by: Johnny Reklai
- Succeeded by: Surangel S. Whipps
- In office October 1986 – 1991
- Preceded by: Isidoro Rudimch
- Succeeded by: Isidoro Rudimch

Personal details
- Born: 10 December 1943 (age 81)

Joshua Koshiba (born 10 December 1943) is a former member of the Senate of Palau. After his re-election in 2004, he became the longest-serving member of that body in the history of Palau. Koshiba was elected seven consecutive terms as Senator from 1980 to 2008.

== Political career ==
Koshiba was born in Peleliu. He graduated from the University of Guam, holding a degree in mathematics.

Koshiba was first elected to the Palauan Senate in 1980. In 1984, he became chairman of the Senate Committee on Foreign Affairs. In 1986, he became Senate President, a post which he held until 1991. He again chaired the Senate Committee on Foreign Affairs from 1992 to 1996; in 1996, he was appointed chairman of the Senate Committee on Education. He headed the Senate Committee on Health and Education from 2000 to 2008.

On 27 March 2007 he was elected as President of the Senate to succeed Johnny Reklai, who had died in a boating accident. On 25 April 2007, Surangel S. Whipps was elected to succeed him as Senate President. In 2008, he announced his intentions to run for President; however, he withdrew his bid following defeat in the primary race.
