= Isidoro Rudimch =

Palauan politician

President of the Senate of Palau
- In office February 1997 – 31 August 1999
- Preceded by: Peter Sugiyama
- Succeeded by: Seit Andres
- In office 1991 – November 1992
- Preceded by: Joshua Koshiba
- Succeeded by: Peter Sugiyama
- In office January 1985 – October 1986
- Preceded by: Kaleb Udui
- Succeeded by: Joshua Koshiba

Personal details
- Born: 4 April 1942; Koror, Palau
- Died: 31 August 1999 (aged 57)
- Children: 8, including Eyos and Mark

Isidoro Rudimch (4 April 1942 – 31 August 1999) was a Palauan entrepreneur, politician and President of the Senate of Palau.

Rudimch was born 4 April 1942 in Koror. He attended Xavier High School in Truk, and St. Joseph High School in Hilo and Chaminade College in Hawai'i. He was an entrepreneur in Koror.

Rudimch was elected as a member of the Congress of Micronesia lower house, House of Representatives, in 1970s.

Rudimch was a candidate for Vice President of Palau in the 1980 elections, but did not succeed. Rudimch was elected to the Senate of Palau four times, from January 1985 until his death. He was elected as the President of the Senate of Palau three times: from January 1985 to October 1986, from 1991 to November 1992 and February 1997 until his death 31 August 1999.

Rudimch had eight children including Eyos Rudimch and Mark Rudimch.
