= Katharine Kesolei =

Palauan anthropologist and politician

Personal details
- Born: 1942 Ngchesar, Babeldaob, Palau
- Died: October 13, 2015 (aged 72–73) St. Luke's Global City Hospital, Manila or Taguig, Philippines
- Education: University of Hawaiʻi at Mānoa

Katharine Kesolei (1942 - 13 October 2015) was an anthropologist and Senator from Palau.

== Biography ==
Kesolei was born in the state of Ngchesar, on Babeldaob island.

In 1960, Kesolei was involved with founding the Micronesian Girls Association. She was also a member of Mechesil Belau, Palau’s traditional women leaders' group, and contributed to its annual conference from 1994 until her death. The conference became a national public forum for traditional women leaders to discuss and propose resolutions for government to enact with regard to cultural, social, health and environmental challenges.

Kesolei studied anthropology at the University of Hawaiʻi at Mānoa and became an expert in cultural conservation. She led a number of initiatives to celebrate and preserve Palauan culture and history, such as the writing of a four volume anthology of Palauan legends and history, and directed the Palau History Development Project in her role as Director of the Palau Community Action Agency. She was a long-serving chairperson for the Palau Cultural and Historical Advisory Board.

In 2009 Kesolei was elected to the Palau National Congress; she was re-elected in 2012. Her 2012 campaign motto was ‘Promoting cultural awareness and stewardship to safeguard our heritage for future generations; supporting a better Belau towards sustainable development and economic growth; supporting healthy lifestyle and living for our Belau’.

While a Senator, Kesolei worked to achieve the United Nations Millennium Development Goals and introduced legislation to create the Bureau of Social Services under the Ministry of Community and Cultural Affairs. She also introduced the Palau Family Protection Act in 2010 to address family violence and enforce protection for victims and legal consequences for perpetrators.

At the time of her death in 2015, aged 73, she was Vice-President of the Senate of Palau. Kesolei died of cancer at St. Luke’s Global City Hospital in Manila or Taguig, Philippines.
