= Uduch Sengebau Senior =

Palauan lawyer, judge, and politician

Her Excellency J. Uduch Sengebau Senior
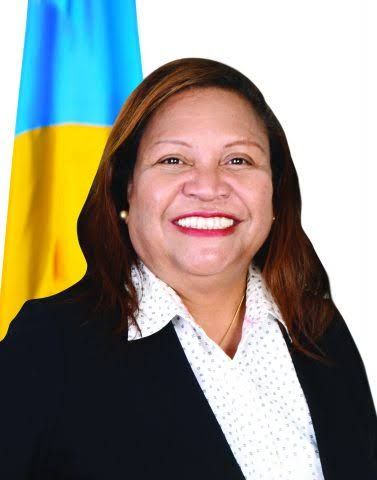
- Official portrait, 2021

10th Vice President of Palau
- In office 21 January 2021 – 16 January 2025
- President: Surangel Whipps Jr.
- Preceded by: Raynold Oilouch
- Succeeded by: Raynold Oilouch

Justice Minister of Palau
- In office 21 July 2021 – 16 January 2025
- President: Surangel Whipps Jr.
- Preceded by: Raynold Oilouch
- Succeeded by: Jennifer Olegeriil

Minister of State of Palau
- In office 21 January 2021 – 21 July 2021
- President: Surangel Whipps Jr.
- Preceded by: Faustina K. Rehuher-Marugg
- Succeeded by: Gustav N. Aitaro

Senator 9th and 10th OEK Senate of Palau
- In office January 2013 – 21 January 2021

Senior Judge Palau Land Court
- In office 2003–2007

Personal details
- Born: 1965 (age 60–61) Ngerbeched, Koror, Palau
- Party: Independent
- Spouse: Jerome Senior
- Children: 4
- Education: University of Hawaiʻi

J. Uduch Sengebau Senior (born 1965, Ngerbeched, Koror, Palau) is a Palauan lawyer, judge, and politician who served as the Vice President of Palau from 2021 to 2025. She was previously a member of the Senate of Palau from 2013 until she took office as Vice President.

She lost reelection to Raynold Oilouch, her predecessor, in a landslide defeat in 2024.

== Biography ==
Senior attended a Catholic primary school in Palau before receiving her high school education in Waiakea High School, Hawaii, from where she graduated in 1983. She subsequently studied at the University of Hawaiʻi, receiving a Bachelor of Arts and then graduating from the William S. Richardson School of Law with a Juris Doctor degree in 1993.

She returned to work in Palau as a staff attorney of the Micronesian Legal Services Corporation, and also worked as an assistant attorney general, an associate judge of the Land Court and an associate justice pro tem of the appellate division of the Supreme Court of Palau. She was senior judge of the Land Court from 2003 until her resignation in 2007. Senior then worked as a lawyer in private practice until her election to parliament.

She was first elected to the Senate at the 2012 election. In her first term, she introduced a bill mandating maternity leave and banning discrimination against pregnant women, and advocated for gender equality in public office. She also established a non-government organisation, Centre for Women’s Empowerment Palau, to support women in leadership positions. She was re-elected at the 2016 election. She was formerly the Chairperson of the Senate Judiciary & Governmental Affairs Committee, but resigned in July 2017.

In addition to the portfolio of Vice President of Palau since January 2021, she was assigned as Minister of State, and was reassigned in July 2021 as Justice Minister of Palau.

Political offices
Preceded by Raynold Oilouch	Vice President of Palau; 2021–2025	Succeeded by Raynold Oilouch
