= History of Palau =

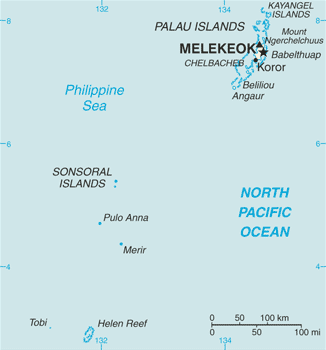
Republic of Palau

Palau was initially settled around 1000 BC.

Palau was likely sighted for the first time by Europeans as early as 1522, when the Spanish mission of the Trinidad, the flagship of Ferdinand Magellan's voyage of circumnavigation, sighted two small islands around the 5th parallel north, naming them "San Juan" without visiting them.

Palau was subsequently discovered by the Europeans on 28 December 1696 when the first map of Palau was drawn by the Czech missionary Paul Klein based on a description given by a group of Palauans shipwrecked on the Philippine coast on Samar. This map and a letter sent to Europe by Klein in June 1697 had a vast impact on interest in Palau. It resulted in the first Jesuit attempts to travel to the islands from the Philippines in 1700, 1708 and 1709, which failed to establish missions. The islands were then visited by the Jesuit expedition led by Francisco Padilla on 30 November 1710, who left two priests Jacques Du Beron and Joseph Cortyl stranded on the coast of Sonsorol, while the mother ship Santissima Trinidad was swept away by a storm. Subsequent attempts to save Du Beron and Cortyl revealed that they were killed and eaten by the locals.

British traders became prominent visitors in the 18th century, followed by expanding Spanish influence in the 19th century; the Palau islands were made part of the Spanish East Indies in 1885. After its defeat in the Spanish–American War in 1898, Spain sold Palau and most of the rest of the Caroline Islands to Germany in 1899 under the terms of the German–Spanish Treaty, with the Palauan islands administered as part of German New Guinea. Control passed to Japan during World War I. In the course of World War II the islands were taken by the United States in 1944. The Battle of Peleliu between September 15 and November 25, 1944, was hard fought, with 2,000 Americans and 10,000 Japanese killed. The islands passed formally to the United States under United Nations auspices in 1947 as part of the Trust Territory of the Pacific Islands.

Four of the Trust Territory districts formed a single state, the Federated States of Micronesia, in 1979, but the districts of Palau and the Marshall Islands declined to participate. Palau, the westernmost cluster of the Caroline Islands, instead opted for independent status in 1978, approved a new constitution and became the Republic of Palau in 1981, and signed a Compact of Free Association with the United States in 1982. After eight referendums and an amendment to the Palauan constitution, the Compact was ratified in 1993 and went into effect on October 1, 1994, marking Palau independence de jure (after Palau was independent de facto since May 25, 1994, when the trusteeship was cancelled).

Legislation making Palau an "offshore" financial center was passed by the Senate in 1998. In 2001, Palau passed its first bank regulation and anti-money laundering laws.

== Archaeology ==
Carbon dating of cave burials show a pygmy population, presumably the result of insular dwarfism, from at least 3,000, and perhaps as long as 4,500 years ago until about 900 years ago (1000–2500 BC until ca. 1100 AD).

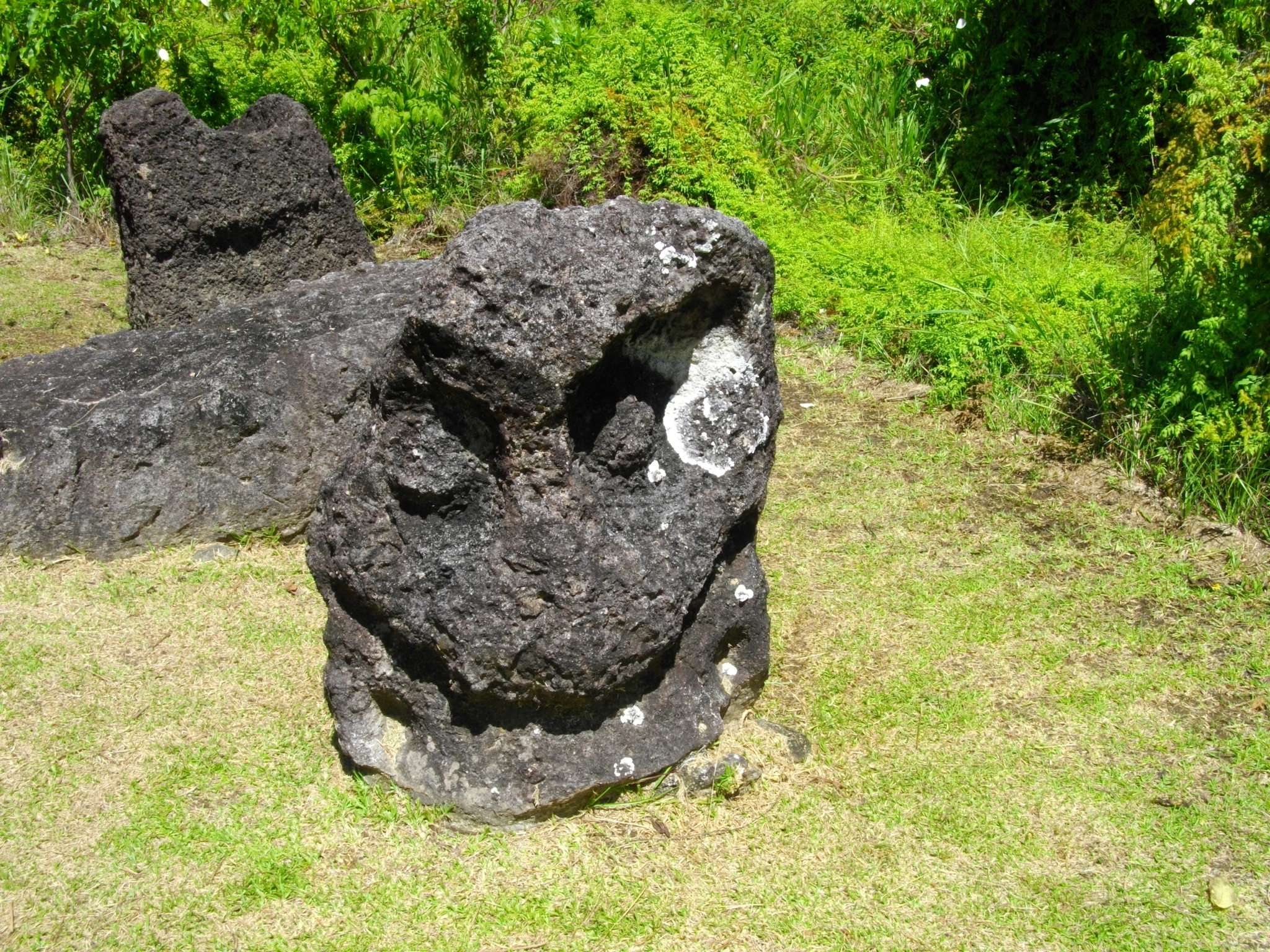
Carved stone face at Badrulchau, 2nd century AD

Evidence for early occupation in Palau comes from several loci scattered across the archipelago. Unfortunately, the earliest radiocarbon dates are not from clear contexts and thus provide little data on the early occupations. The earliest acceptable dates for Palau are from the 1st century and 2nd century A. D. Dates from the 1st and 5th century come from midden deposits on Kayangel. The earlier date is from tridacna shell from a deposit which may lie beneath the lowest cultural deposit. The shell is not associated with other artifacts and it is not clear if nearby artifacts are from a permanent occupation of the atoll. The 5th century date is associated with other artifacts, but it is still not clear if this part of the midden derives from a permanent occupation. In another study, Osborne obtained a date of A. D. 161 from excavations at the Badrulchau Site. The date is from a composite charcoal sample in a level under the stone pillar structure and apparently underlying the terracing on the hillside.

The construction and maintenance of terraces on the volcanic islands appears to precede the formation of the formal, nucleated, settlements observed at European contact in 1783. Furthermore, there is evidence of an intensification in the construction of terraces at the start of the second millennium. At about the same time as intensification of terrace construction on the volcanic islands, evidence from the rock islands suggests an increasing nucleation of settlements.

Although many terrace systems are found on the hills ringing the volcanic islands, and possibly even some terraces in the rock islands, it has proven difficult to obtain solid chronological data on these. The variety of different forms of terraces and special features associated with terraces such as "crown and brim " elaborations " suggest that the terraces functioned in different ways. The location and organizational characteristics of habitations associated with terraces appear to have been, to some extent, different than that of the historic pattern of traditional villages in coastal areas. At present, information on associations between the terraces and earlier habitation sites is lacking. Radiocarbon dates associated with terracing range from 491 to 1810. Most of the dates associated with terraces fall between 895 and 1165. The most recent date, 1810, is from a shell midden eroding out of the face of a terrace; the midden was apparently buried in the continuing building of the terrace.

The earliest date associated with cultural material from the rock islands is 620 from the Uchu larois Cave Site, followed by three dates in the 630s from the Mariar Site on Ngeruktabel Island and the Ngidech Beach Site on Ulebsechel Island. Some of these middens, especially from the Uchularois Cave Site, contain large quantities of artifacts, suggesting that they are the result of the intensive exploitation of marine resources, shellfish in particular.

Later data from rock island sites suggest important changes in the settlement system with the development of nucleated villages. Evidence from legends and the tight clustering of the radiocarbon dates suggests that the villages were abandoned abruptly early in the 15th century. However, there is evidence of continued exploitation of resources in the rock islands after the abandonment of the villages. There are five dates from rock island sites in clear association with structures, and these dates range from 1200 to 1420. These dates, together with the size and complexity of village sites in the rock islands, suggest that these villages were permanently occupied during this time. It is probable that permanently occupied villages developed before 1200. There are four dates from middens in rock island sites ranging from 1345 until 1950. These latter four dates are not in association with structures, however.

The formation of the village systems observed historically appears to reflect a major transformation in Palauan society. The archaeological village sites on the volcanic islands are organized the same as the villages recorded historically by Keate (1789), Semper (1873), Kubary (1889), and Krämer (1919). The recorded village sites consist of clusters of features indicating the integration of domestic and community activities. The large stone features recorded in village sites have specific historic references in the oral tradition of Palau. These facts suggest that the village organization we see today evolved in the 14th and 15th centuries. By the end of the 16th century, the social system we see reflected in modern villages was largely in place.

== Historical architecture ==
=== Construction materials and techniques ===
In construction various local materials were used. Intsia bijuga was typically used for house framing, as it is a strong and heavy hardwood. Stemonorus ammui is used by the locals for beams, posts, and crossbeams. Gmelina palawensis is used for making posts, as well as walls. All three of these species are used by the locals for flooring as well.

The local materials and species were used to make structures such as communal meeting house (bai), which hold cultural importance. Other distinct features of Palauan architecture is the use of coral stones, which were used to construct foundations for the bai.

Layering multiple layers of basalt stones around an earthen core was the foundational stonework for many buildings and platforms, such as platforms for resting, residences, village meeting houses, cooking platforms, club houses, and burial platforms.

=== Structures and architectural features ===
The communal meeting houses have carvings and paintings of traditional myths of Palauan culture. The villages were set in a nucleated pattern, as opposed to an isolated or dispersed pattern of hamlets and homesteads. Stone pathways were laid from one house or area to another. Other possible structures with stone features in the village included bathing places, shrines, wells, docks and boathouses, and club houses.

To weather the climate and its conditions, the structures often have raised platforms and open designs to provide ventilation. The locals also conducted landscaping activities by making step terraces for agricultural purposes and to support structures.

Around 1250 AD, the Palauan population returned to coastal settlements after a transitional period. This is where the stonework era begins.

=== Later external influences ===
Colonization influenced the architecture of Palau, with the Spanish, Germans, and Japanese bringing new materials and techniques. With the introduction of Christianity via the Spanish, baroque style stone churches were erected on the island. During the German colonial period, buildings that contributed to economic functions were built. Then the Japanese occupation saw many administrative and civic buildings be erected, which built up the infrastructure of Palau.

Post World War II, Palau experienced modernistic style architecture and international style architecture. The mix of influences have given the Palauan people a unique sense and mixture of styles in architecture, whether it be indigenous, colonial, or modern and international style.

== Pre-contact ==
The Palauan language is an outlier among the Austronesian languages, and so does not shed much light on the origins of the modern population. However, there are some indications that it may derive from the Sunda Islands (modern Indonesia).

Migration to and colonization of the islands took place sometime around 3,200–2,800 years ago, but no later than the first centuries A.D. By 600 A.D. settlements were established throughout the archipelago.

For thousands of years, Palauans have had a well established matrilineal society, believed to have descended from Javanese precedents. Recently, it was found that the Palauan people do indeed have ancestry from Java, however, using recent breakthroughs in genetic analysis, it was found that they are most likely descended from the Morotai Island of North Maluku in Indonesia. This may have significant impacts on the understandings of migration to the Pacific Islands.

Traditionally land, money, and titles passed through the female line, while men would work and fight wars. High Chiefs were chosen by Queens (high-ranking women) only. The Islands were ruled by ten clans, clan lands continue to be passed through titled women and first daughters but there is also a modern patrilineal sentiment introduced by imperial Japan. The Japanese government attempted to confiscate and redistribute tribal land into personal ownership during World War II, and there has been little attempt to restore the old order. Legal entanglements continue amongst the various clans.

The Traditional name for the islands is 'Belau', and the traditional name for Palauan people is 'Rechad er Belau.'

== European contact and discovery in 1696 ==
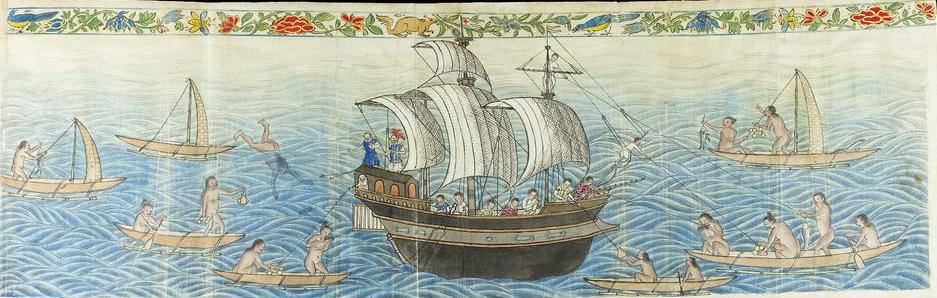
Manila Galleon in the Marianas and Carolinas, c. 1590 Boxer Codex

Palau had limited relations with the outside world before the 18th century, mainly with Yap and Java.

There still is a debate whether the islands were or were not seen by some of the early European discoverers in the 16th century, specifically whether Spaniard Ruy López de Villalobos, who landed in several Caroline Islands, spotted the Palau archipelago in 1543. No conclusive evidence exists, but some believe he could have seen the tip of a southernmost island in the group.

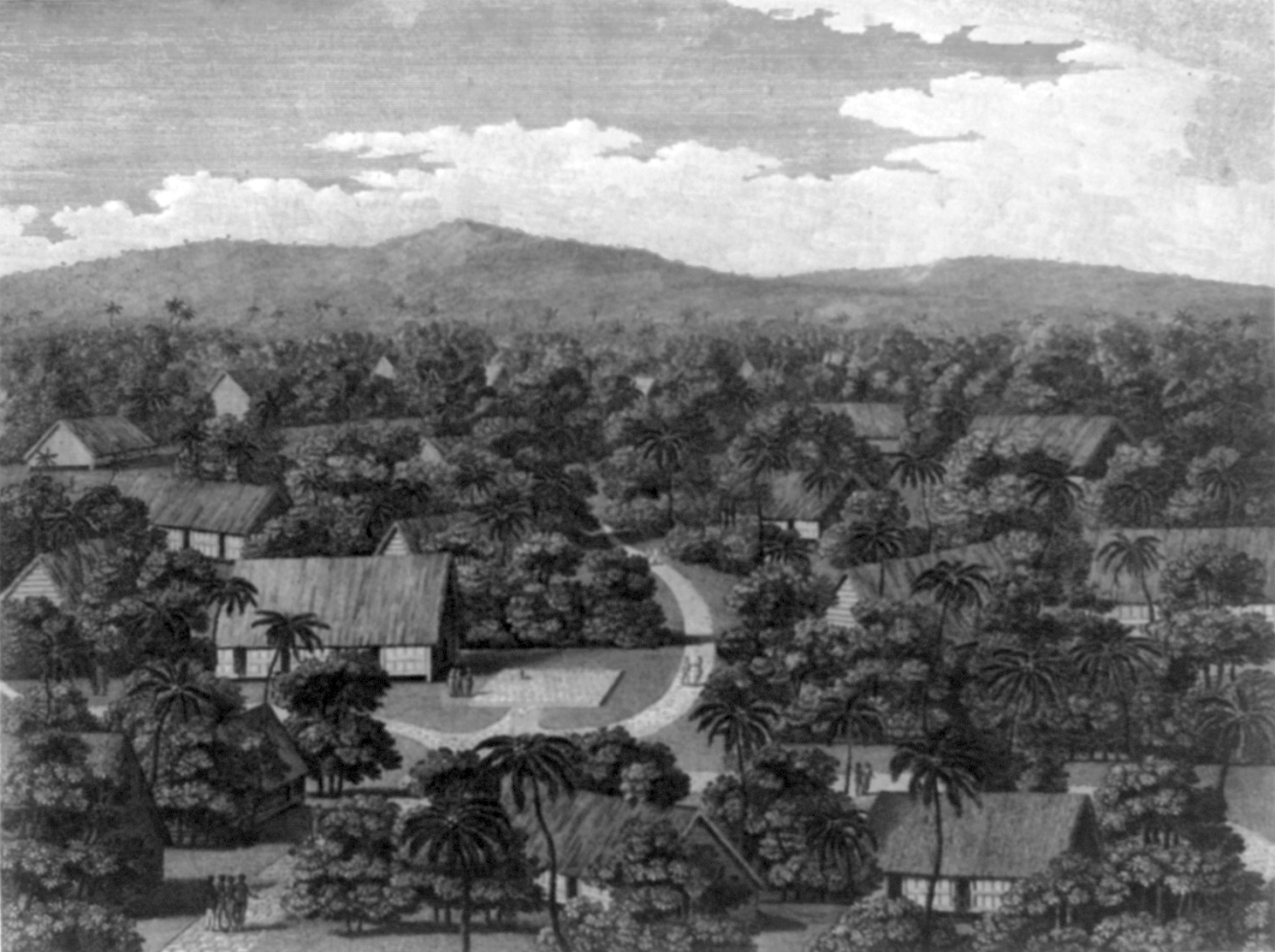
View of part of the town of Pelew, and the place of Council, 1788

The first verifiable knowledge of Palau by Europeans came a century later in December 1696, when a group of Palauan islanders shipwrecked on the Philippines island of Samar. They were interviewed by the Czech missionary Paul Klein on 28 December 1696. Klein was not only able to draw the first map of Palau based on a drawing and a set of pebbles on the beach, but also to send an important letter in June 1697 to Europe. This map and the letter caused significant interest in the new islands and resulted in the first failed Jesuit attempts to travel to Palau from the Philippines in 1700, 1708 and 1709.

The islands were first visited by the Jesuit expedition led by Francisco Padilla on 30 November 1710, only to leave two stranded priests, Jacques Du Beron and Joseph Cortyl, on the coast of Sonsorol, while the mother ship Santissima Trinidad was being swept away by a storm. The islands were visited again in 1712 by an expedition led by Bernardo de Egui, which was largely unsuccessful in engaging with the islanders..

Englishman Henry Wilson, captain of the East India Company's packet ship Antelope, was shipwrecked off the island of Ulong in 1783. The High Chief of (Koror) Palau allowed Captain Wilson to take his son, Prince Lee Boo, to England, where he arrived in 1784. However, the prince died soon after of smallpox. The East India Company erected a monument over his grave in St Mary's Churchyard, Rotherhithe. It was Wilson who gave the archipelago the name "Pelew Islands". The wreck of the Antelope began European intervention in Palauan affairs and marked the beginning of nearly two centuries of colonial domination of the islands .

== Spanish rule ==
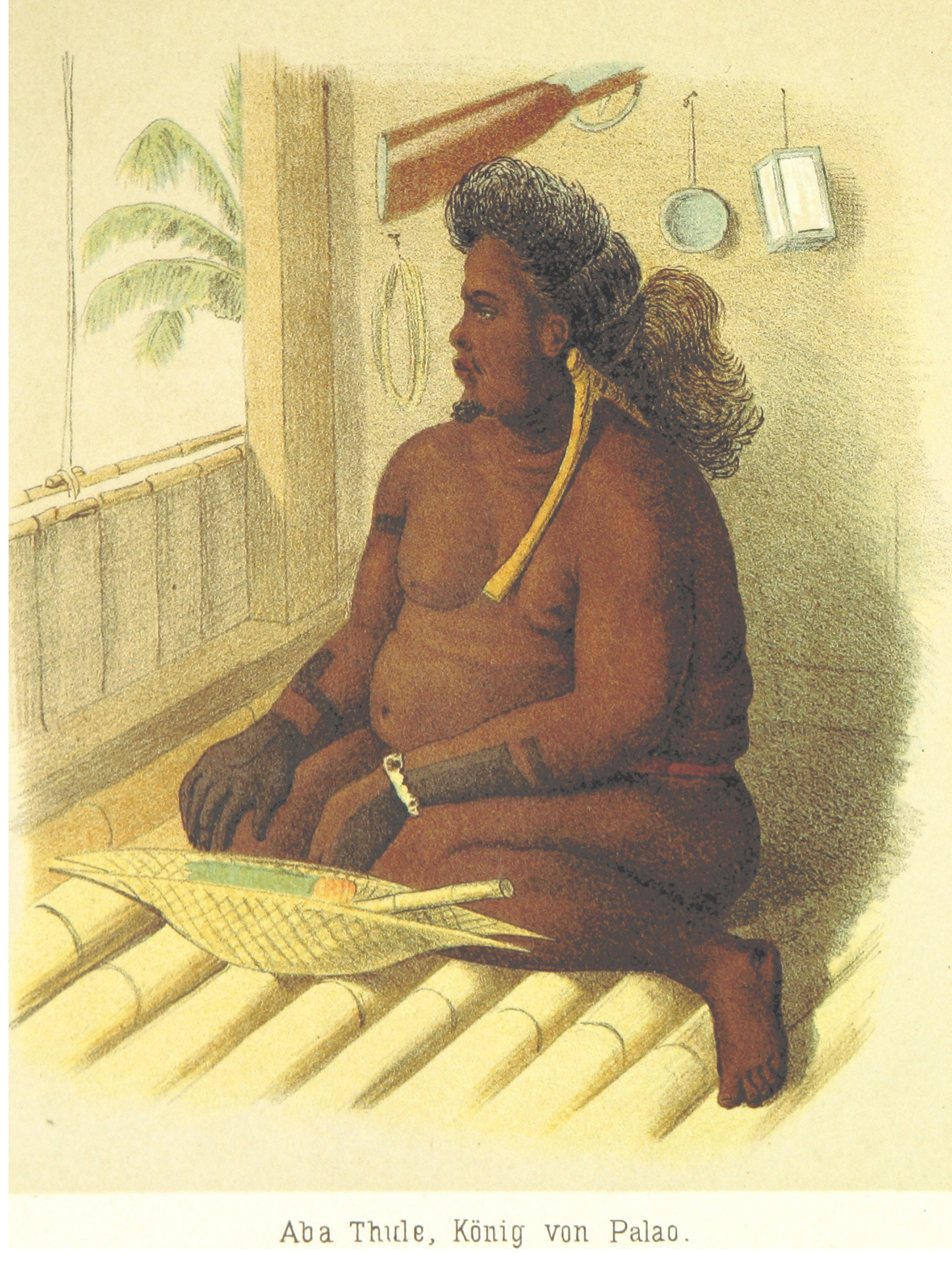
Aba Thule, King of Palau, 1883

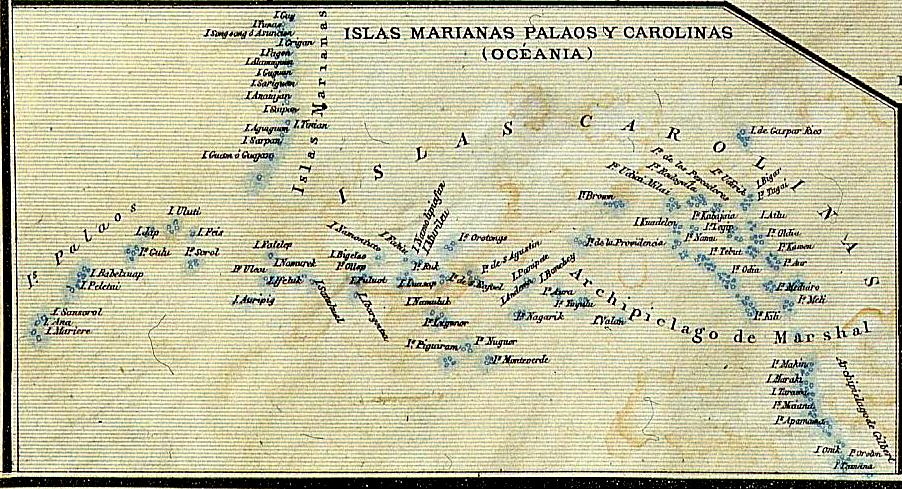
Map of 1888 showing the Spanish East Indies, including Palau Islands (map without Philippines)

In the late 19th century, possession of the islands was claimed by Britain, Spain, and Imperial Germany. In 1885, the matter was brought to Pope Leo XIII for a decision. The Pope recognized the Spanish claim, but granted economic concessions to Britain and Germany. Palau then became part of the Spanish East Indies, along with the Mariana Islands, the Marshall Islands, and the rest of the Caroline Islands. They were all administered from the Philippines.

In 1885 the Spanish gained administrative control of the islands. By this time the focus of trepang production had shifted to the Philippines and Indonesia, and Palau no longer played an important role. Like the British, the Spanish did little to develop the islands, but they did establish Catholic missions in Koror and Melekeok.

After being defeated in 1898 in the Spanish–American War and losing possession of the Philippine Islands, Spain sold the Palau archipelago to Imperial Germany in the 1899 German–Spanish Treaty.

== German era ==
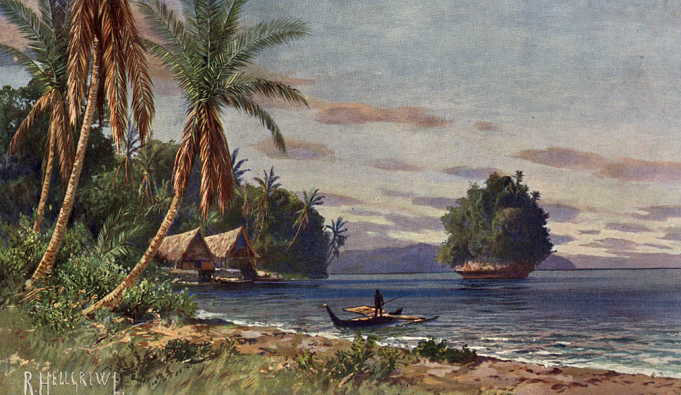
Palau during German colonization: painting by Rudolf Hellgrewe, from Das Buch von unseren Kolonien by Ottomar Beta (Leipzig, 1908)

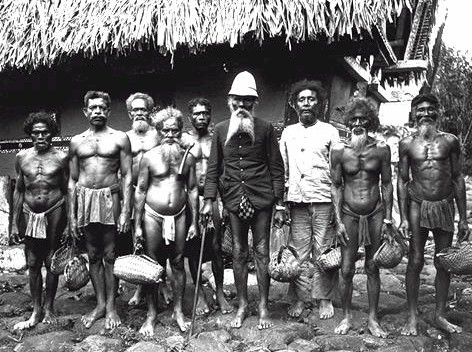
Koror chiefs in 1915

In 1898 Spain sold its rights in Palau to Germany. Palau was administered from German New Guinea, and a period of economic development began. German engineers began exploiting the islands' deposits of bauxite and phosphate, and a rich harvest in copra was made.

The German Administration established and operated several mining companies and several copra plantations. Also, perhaps as important as the economic development, the German Administration began pushing for social reforms which included the relocation of people into larger villages and a large number of public works projects such as the construction of piers and navigation beacons. Young men were forced to work in the phosphate mines on Angaur and Beliliou Islands, on the copra plantations, and on a never completed ditch across the most narrow part of Babeldaob Island in what is today the state of Ngaraard.

== Japanese mandate ==
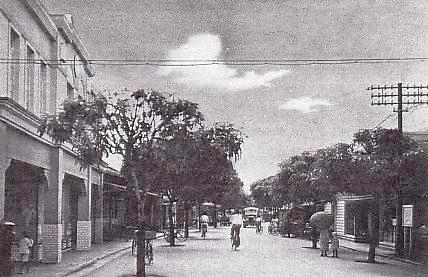
Koror during the Japanese Mandate

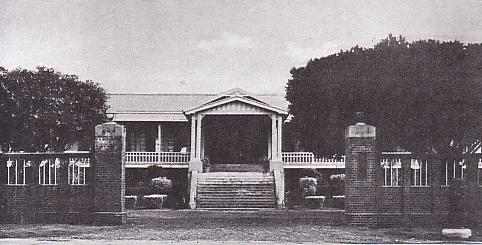
The Headquarters of the South Seas Mandate

Under the terms of the Anglo-Japanese Alliance, the Empire of Japan declared war on the German Empire in 1914 and invaded German colonial empire in the Pacific Ocean. Palau was seized by ships of the Imperial Japanese Navy. After the war, the League of Nations awarded Palau to Japan as a Class C League of Nations Mandate.

During World War I, the Japanese administration continued many of the programs already established by the German administration. A Japanese military government ruled the islands during the war years, but was replaced by a civilian one which existed until the start of World War II. Whereas the Germans wanted to foster certain mercantile enterprises with a minimum of personnel and resources, the Japanese administration had very different aims. The Japanese sought to create in Micronesia an extension of Japanese culture and economy. Large numbers of Japanese and Ryukyuans were encouraged to emigrate to Micronesia to work on plantations or in other economic enterprises, resulting in Palau becoming a major colonial center. By 1938, there were approximately 15,000 Japanese in Palau as opposed to about 6,000 Palauans and Koror had expanded into a substantial all-Japanese city.

Japan incorporated the islands as an integral part of its empire, establishing the Nan'yō Government with Koror Island as the capital. From 1914 to 1922, the Japanese Imperial Navy had been in control. Civilian control was introduced from 1922, and Palau was one of six administrative districts within the Mandate. Japan mounted an aggressive economic development program and promoted large scale immigration by Japanese, Ryukyuans and Koreans. Native Palauans soon became a small minority in their own homeland. The Japanese continued the German mining activities, and also established bonito (skipjack tuna) canning and copra processing plants in Palau.

Japanese trading companies were quick to establish operations to exploit the economic potential of the islands, especially the abundant fish resources and pearl harvesting. The Japanese established a commercial center in Koror, and began developing a series of agricultural plantations on Babeldaob Island. Following World War I, the civilian government instituted a series of major changes in Palauan life. The changes included establishing primary schools for Palauans and constructing modern water and electrical systems. Elderly informants remember the Japanese administration as a time of order when things worked well. Despite the substantial improvements made in social services for the Palauans, the Japanese were quite clear on the role and status of the native peoples in Micronesia. Native peoples were to be second class citizens and serve as a source of cheap labor for the various agricultural and mercantile enterprises.

== World War II ==
Life was especially hard for Palauans during World War II. By the late 1930s the Japanese military build-up was well underway and some restrictions were already being applied to Palauans. When the war began to turn against the Japanese in 1942, the restrictions on Palauans were increased and shortages became common. Palauans were forced into labor gangs to help build island defenses. The Japanese began to relocate large numbers of Palauans from the larger towns on Orcor and Beliliou to villages on Babeldaob Island. Palauan villages were expected to increase food production to help feed the large number of Japanese troops.

In 1944, American forces took the islands of Beliliou and Angaur in a bitter and bloody battle. Making use of the large number of natural openings in the coralline limestone formations, the Japanese had created a defensive fortress of interlocking tunnels, bunkers, and hardened gun positions where more than 10,000 defenders could safely wait out the naval bombardment. As the Americans made their way to the beaches, they were met with withering fire from numerous undamaged gun emplacements. It would take more than 66 days and cost the better part of one entire Marine division to secure the island. Key defensive positions had to be taken one at a time at appalling cost. Following the bloody experience on Beliliou, U.S. military planners were content to bypass the 30,000 or so Japanese troops remaining in Koror and Babeldaob. Aircraft based on Beliliou and Angaur conducted daily harassment raids over the northern islands.

The final months of the war were grim. U.S. aircraft roamed over the skies looking for targets to bomb and strafe. The large garrison of Japanese soldiers ran out of food and became desperate. Informants remember the terror of aerial attacks and Japanese soldiers taking food supplies that were already short. Starvation and disease began to take a toll prior to the surrender and repatriation of Japanese forces.

At the end of the Pacific War, less than five thousand Palauans were left alive with many Palauan families adopting Japanese children into their midst (those refused passage back to Japan, as they were too young to make the dangerous journey). All surviving Japanese were repatriated after the end of the war. There are still about 100 American servicemen listed as missing in action in Palau. Starting in 1993, a small group of American volunteers called The BentProp Project has searched the waters and jungles of Palau for information that could lead to the identification and recovery of these remains. The Palauan people, in recognition of the basic human hospitality that is unique to all people of the islands all over the planet, allowed the Japanese and US governments to search for their missing soldiers as well as bringing back their remains.

== Post-war era ==
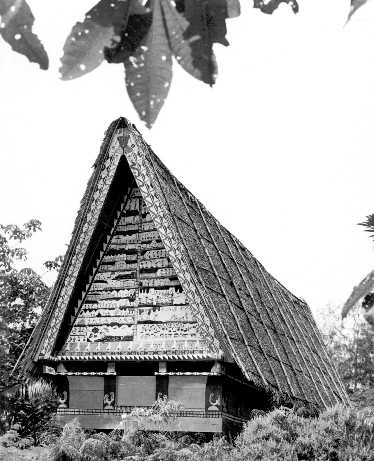
Palau Museum Bai in 1970s

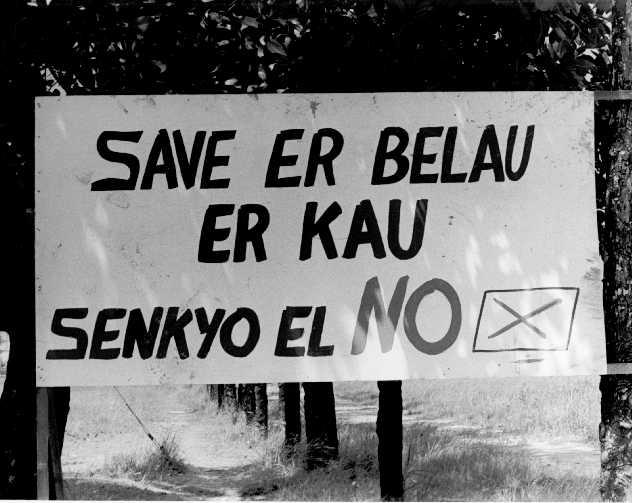
"Vote No" sign, Micronesian constitutional referendum in Palau, 1978

In 1947, the United States, as the post-World War II occupying power, agreed to administer Palau as part of the U.N.-created Trust Territory of the Pacific Islands (TTPI). While the U.S. used Palau as a strategic military base, it was reluctant to provide socioeconomic development and welfare for the residents in order to protect their traditional way of life. This policy was criticized as a "zoo policy", and in the 1960s, the policy was changed to include Peace Corps deployments and technical assistance in education, medicine, and industry. In the 1970s, the U.S. undertook a major capital improvement program, upgrading facilities for such things as transportation, water, and sewage. After many years of talks on a post-trust status for Palau, the U.S. Congress in 1986 approved a Compact of Free Association agreed to by U.S. and Palauan negotiators. While supported by a majority of Palauan voters in each of seven referendums, compact proponents failed to gain the 75% majority required by Palau's constitution to approve issues with possible nuclear implications. After adoption of a constitutional amendment and a long period of transition, including the violent deaths of two presidents (Haruo Remeliik in 1985 and Lazarus Salii in 1988), Palau's courts ruled that the 68% pro-compact vote in an eighth referendum—held November 9, 1993—was sufficient to approve the compact.

On October 1, 1994, following a proclamation by President Clinton, Palau began its independence in free association with the U.S. Under the compact, the U.S. remains responsible for Palau's defense for 50 years. The U.S. must approve the entry into Palauan territory of any foreign military, may establish military bases there, and is permitted to operate nuclear-capable warships there. For 15 years, Palau receives financial assistance from the U.S. and is eligible to participate in some 40 federal programs. It is estimated that the value of U.S. financial and program assistance will exceed $500 million during this period.

In November 2020, Surangel Whipps Jr was elected as the new President of Palau to succeed President Tommy Remengesau.

The New Capitol in Palau

== See also ==
- Imeong Conservation Area
