= Hokkons Baules =

Palauan politician

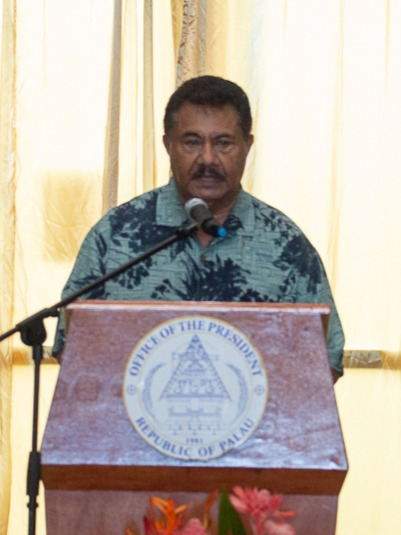
- Baules in 2022

President of the Senate of Palau
- Incumbent
- Assumed office 19 January 2017
- President: Thomas Remengesau Jr. Surangel Whipps Jr.
- Preceded by: Camsek Elias Chin

Member of the Senate of Palau
- Incumbent
- Assumed office 2008
- Preceded by: Johnny Reklai
- In office 1985–1988

Delegate of the 2nd Palau Constitutional Convention
- In office July 2005 – May 2005

Personal details
- Born: 7 June 1948 (age 78)
- Party: Independent
- Children: 3
- Education: Philippine Union College
- Occupation: Businessman

Hokkons Baules (born 7 June 1948) is a Palauan businessman and a politician, and currently a member of the Senate of Palau. He has been the president of the Senate since 19 January 2017. He was elected in 2008 to fill the seat of the late Senate president Johnny Reklai. He had previously served in the Senate of the Second Olbiil Era Kelulau from 1985 until 1988.

== Career ==
Baules was elected to the Senate of the Seventh Olbiil Era Kelulau in a nationwide special election on 9 May 2007, following the passing of the late Senate president Johnny Reklai. He was the top vote-getter in virtually every state of the republic. He graduated from Seventh-day Adventist Elementary School in Koror and went on to graduate from the Palau Mission Academy. He received a Bachelor of Arts degree in history from Philippine Union College.

Baules advocates for Palau to switch its recognition from the Republic of China to the People's Republic of China.

In July 2025, Baules co-signed a letter with House of Delegates speaker Gibson Kanai stating that the National Congress would not accept a United States proposal for Palau to host third country asylum seekers. In February 2026, Baules was barred from entering the U.S. due to allegations of corruption linked to the People's Republic of China.

== See also ==
- China–Palau relations
