= Senate of Palau =

Upper house of the Palau National Congress

Senate Olbiil Era Kelulau
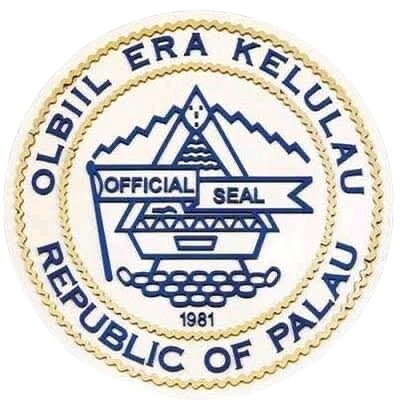

Type
- Type: Upper house of the Palau National Congress

Leadership
- President of the Senate: Hokkons Baules since 19 January 2017
- Vice President of the Senate: Stevenson Kuartei since 16 January 2025
- Floor Leader: Kerai Mariur since 16 January 2025

Structure
- Seats: 15
- Length of term: 4 years

Elections
- Voting system: Plurality block voting
- Last election: 5 November 2024
- Next election: 7 November 2028

Meeting place
- Olbiil era Kelulau building in the capitol complex, Ngerulmud

The Senate of Palau is the upper house of the Palau National Congress (Olbiil era Kelulau). The Senate members are elected to serve four-year terms in multi-seat constituencies. Since January 2025, the Senate has 15 members. No political parties exist. The most recent election was held in November 2024.

== Membership ==
The Constitution does not indicate the number of a members of the Senate. Every 8 years, the National Congress appoints a reapportionment commission to draw up and recommend a district map allocating seats in accordance with the population. Therefore, the number of senators may change as frequently as every 8 years. Any voter can challenge a reapportionment before the Palau Supreme Court.

During the first legislature in 1981, there were 18 Senators, which was reduced to 14 in 1984. In 2000, the number dropped to 9, but in 2008, the number rose to 13, then increased to 15 in 2024.

== Committees ==
The Senate of Palau has 12 standing committees. They are:

Current Standing Committees
Committee
Ways & Means and Financial Matters
Judiciary and Governmental Affairs
Capital Improvement Projects
Health and Education
Tourism Development
Foreign Affairs and State Matters
Resources, Commerce, Trade, and Development
Youth and Social Welfare
Culture and Traditions
Public Utilities, Communications, and Housing Development
Banking and Insurance
Maritime and Climate Change

== Presidents of the Senate ==
Name	Congress	Period	Notes
Kaleb Udui	1st	January 1981 – November 1984	
Isidoro Rudimch	2nd	January 1985 – October 1986	
Joshua Koshiba	2nd	October 1986 – December 1988	
Joshua Koshiba	3rd	January 1989 – 1991	
Isidoro Rudimch	3rd	1991 – November 1992	
Peter Sugiyama	4th	January 1993 – November 1996	
Isidoro Rudimch	5th	February 1997 – 31 August 1999	
Seit Andres	5th	September 1999 – December 2000	
Seit Andres	6th	January 2001 – December 2004	
Surangel S. Whipps	7th	January 2005 – April 2005	
Johnny Reklai	7th	April 2005 – 11 March 2007	
Joshua Koshiba	7th	27 March 2007 – 25 April 2007	
Surangel S. Whipps	7th	25 April 2007 – 15 January 2009	
Mlib Tmetuchl	8th	15 January 2009 – 16 January 2013	
Elias Camsek Chin	9th	16 January 2013 – 19 January 2017	
Hokkons Baules	10th	19 January 2017 – January 2020	
Hokkons Baules	11th	January 2020 – 16 January 2025	
Hokkons Baules	12th	16 January 2025 –	
