= Tem =

Tem or TEM may refer to:

== Acronyms ==
- Threat and error management, an aviation safety management model.
- Telecom Expense Management
- Telecom Equipment Manufacturer
- TEM (currency), local to Volos, Greece
- TEM (nuclear propulsion), a Russian spacecraft propulsion system
- Territorial Efficiency Medal, a United Kingdom award for long service in the Territorial Army
- Test environment management, a function in the software delivery process
- Test For English Majors, like College English Test in China
- Tram Elettrici Mendrisiensi, a former tramway in Ticino, Switzerland
- Transient electromagnetics
- Transmission electron microscopy (or microscope)
- Transverse electromagnetic mode, a transverse mode
- Trans-European Motorways, a regional project
- Triethylenemelamine, a chemotherapeutic agent
- TV TEM, a Brazilian regional television network
- TEM (antiterrorist unit), the antiterrorist unit of the Turkish police

== People, personages, characters ==
- Atum or Tem, an Egyptian deity
- Tem (ibedul), high chief of Koror
- Tem (queen), an ancient Egyptian queen consort
- Tem people of Togo, living around Sokodé
- Temmie Chang, artist and character in Undertale and Deltarune

== Places ==
- Tem, Tajikistan, a small town just outside Khorugh in the Gorno-Badakhshan Autonomous Province
- Temora Airport (IATA airport code TEM)

== Other uses ==
- Pro tem, abbreviation for pro tempore ("for the time being" in Latin), and often for a person who acts as a placeholder
- Tem language of Togo, Ghana, Benin and Burkina Faso
- Temne language of Sierra Leone and Guinea (ISO 639-3 code: tem)
- TEM beta-lactamase, an enzyme

== See also ==
- TEMS (disambiguation)
