= Ibedul succession dispute =

Succession dispute in Koror, Palau

There was a succession dispute following the death of Yutaka Gibbons, the ibedul of the state of Koror, Palau, on November 4, 2021. Gibbons' younger siblings, rechucher-ra-techekii Alexander Merep and bilung Gloria Salii, both initially claimed the title, but Salii would later relent her claim in favour of her son, James Lebuu Littler. Merep was accepted as ibedul by the traditional chiefs of Koror and the Council of Chiefs, although Salii maintains that her son is the ibedul.

== Background ==
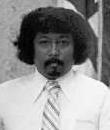
Yutaka Gibbons c. 1978

On November 4, 2021, Yutaka Gibbons, the long-serving ibedul of Koror, died at the age of 77 in Taiwan. Gibbons had worked as a United States Army cook before becoming ibedul in 1973 and ran for president in the 1984, 1988, and 1996 Palauan general elections. He was also an anti–nuclear weapons activist and received the Right Livelihood Award in 1983.

Gibbons' younger brother, Alexander Merep, held the title rechucher-ra-techekii, and his younger sister, Gloria Salii, holds the title of bilung (the female counterpart of ibedul, and the highest ranking female chief in Palau). In a 1979 article in The New York Times, Salii was cited as saying that their titles were passed down to them through a "complex system of inheritance in which the line passes through the sister of the reigning ibedul, provided there is one and she has heirs". Trumbull concluded that the next Ibedul "presumably will be half‐American", referring to Salii's 3-month-old son James Lebuurakuk "Lebuu" Littler. Littler held the title of kloteraol and is currently serving as the administrator of the Palau National Aviation Administration.

== Dispute ==
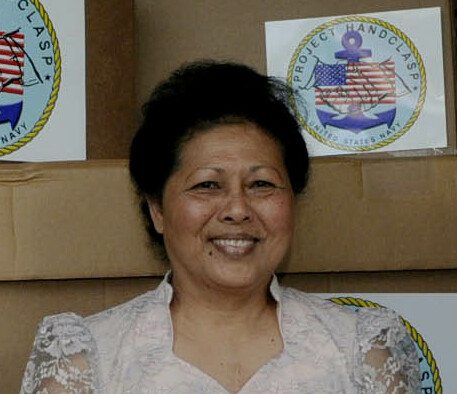
Bilung Gloria Salii (pictured in 2010) claimed the title of ibedul after the death of her brother

In December 2021, Bilung Salii stated that she had assumed the duties and responsibilities of ibedul and claimed she should be receiving a monthly honorarium. She wrote a letter to the governor of Koror Ngiraikelau Franco Gibbons requesting that the monthly honorarium of ibedul be issued to her name. Governor Gibbons's attorney said that the law of Koror dictated that the honorarium be paid to a person that "actually holds a title and sits as a member of the House of Traditional Leaders" and that if there is more than one claimant to the title the honorarium is held until the court decides who the proper holder of the title is. Salii also informed the Council of Chiefs that she had taken over the duties with the council, simply stating "that they look forward to the submission of the name of the next ibedul." The Island Times noted that it is rare for a keldorolel a rubak (female counterpart) to assume the title of their male counterpart and that it is the first time that this has occurred in the position of a paramount chief in Palau.

On January 6, 2022, Salii sent a letter to the House of Traditional Leaders, in which she told them that she had removed the title of rechucher-ra-techekii from her brother Alexander Merep and removed him from the House of Traditional Leaders. A similar letter from Rimuu Dominica Ngoriak removed Harry Fritz from the house by removing his title of adelbairekesoaol. Ten chiefs of the house, 6 ngarameketii, and 4 rubekul kldeu sent letters to both Salii and Ngoriak asking why they were expelling their "friends", saying that they had been loyal and productive members of the house for years. Salii sent another letter to Ngiraikelau Gibbons stating "I am ibedul and bilung at this time. I call the meeting of the council of chiefs." She also told Gibbons that Merep had been removed from his seat and should not be asked to attend chief meetings. The new governor of Koror Eyos Rudimch wrote a letter to Salii requesting time to review her request for the honorarium of ibedul. Rudimch stated that he had "no say on the matters of [the] Idid clan or its chiefs" but since the issue relates to the law, he has to conduct a legal review. On January 26, 2022, Rudimch informed Salii that the state government could not process her request for the honorarium until the House of Traditional Leaders accepted someone as ibedul. Salii would control the house's office, staff, and operations until February 4, 2022, when she capitulated from her previous claims that she was the ibedul and returned the traditional chief's property, reportedly because they were threatening a lawsuit.

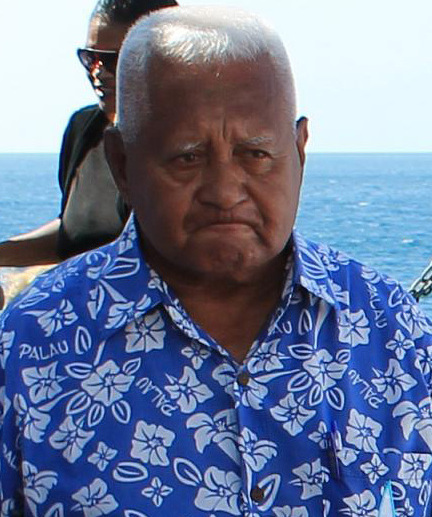
The co-chair of the Council of Chiefs, reklai Raphael Ngirmang (pictured in 2013), approved Alexander Merep as ibedul in April 2022

After the 100-day mourning period for Yutaka Gibbons ended on February 22, 2022, the ngarameketii (traditional chiefs of Koror) accepted Merep as the new ibedul of Koror with reports saying he was appointed by Idid female members led by Ochob Katey Ngiraked who were opposed to Salii. He was also accepted by Koror's hamlet chiefs. Island Times reported that Salii had appointed her son James Lebuu Littler as ibedul but had not submitted his name to the ngarameketii for their approval. On March 10, 2023, Merep was formally installed as ibedul in a ceremony at the Koror chief's bai. At the ceremony Merep received $20,000 and 5 pieces of various types of Palauan currency. In response, Salii held a ceremony for her son in Ngerchemai where he washed his hands in turtle blood before going to Peleliu to obtain his crown pertaining to tradition. On March 25, 2023, Ibedul Merep signed letters approving four new chiefs in Koror which included approving Ochob Katey Ngiraked's reported appointment of James Lebuu Littler to Merep's former title of rechucher-ra-techekii, which in turn made them members of the House of Traditional Leaders. Salii did not appoint her son as rechucher-ra-techekii stating that "nothing has changed. The process of Lebuu Littler becoming ibedul is still very much ongoing."

On April 5, 2022, the co-chair of the Council of Chiefs Reklai Raphael Ngirmang said in a letter that he had approved Merep as a "friend and member of the Council of Chiefs" and as ibedul he became the other co-chair of the Council of Chiefs on April 20, 2022. On April 29, 2022, the Council of Chiefs notified President Surangel Whipps Jr., Senate President Hokkons Baules and House Speaker Sabino Anastacio that the seat of ibedul was no longer vacant. In May 2022, Salii wrote a letter to President Surangel Whipps Jr. rejecting the letter from the Council of Chiefs saying "I remind you again that Alex is not ibedul of Idid Clan. Only me, bilung, appoints ibedul of Idid and no one else can appoint because they are not bilung, it's not their title." Salii claimed that in the past Merep had tried to sue his siblings to claim clan lands for his children. She also claimed that Merep had a stroke and is partially blind and so cannot represent the Idid clan as he will "weaken the clan". Additionally, she was against the idea of the ibedul co-chairing the council, stating that the ibedul is the "highest title in Palau and does not share or co-chair with another title" which she attributes to wars won by Koror.
