= Governor Gibbons =

Governor Gibbons may refer to:

- Franco Gibbons, Governor of Koror
- Jim Gibbons (American politician) (born 1944), Governor of Nevada
- John C. Gibbons (died 2021), Governor of Koror
