= DePaiva family murders =

2003 mass murder in Palau

- Location of Airai within Palau
- Location: Airai, Palau
- Date: 22 December 2003
- Target: DePaiva family (4 people)
- Attack type: Home invasion, murder, kidnapping, rape, child sexual abuse
- Weapon: Knife
- Deaths: 3
- Injuries: 1 (Melissa DePaiva)
- Victims: Ruimar DePaiva, 42; Margareth DePaiva, 37; Larisson DePaiva, 11
- Perpetrator: Justin Hirosi
- Motive: Burglary, rape
- Verdict: Life imprisonment (3 terms)
- Convictions: Second-degree murder (3 counts); Kidnapping; Rape; Child sexual abuse; Indecent assault

On 22 December 2003, pastor Ruimar Duarte DePaiva, his wife Margareth, and their 11-year-old son Larisson, were murdered in their home in Airai, Palau.

The family was part of a Seventh-day Adventist Church mission from Michigan working with the local church in Koror. The murders gained national attention in Palau, a country with a traditional low crime rate.

== Background ==
Ruimar Duarte DePaiva was born into a Christian missionary family on the banks of the Amazon River, Brazil. He was one of four children of Itamar and Ruth DePaiva, who had been preaching in the Amazonia region as members of the Seventh-day Adventist Church. They later moved to the U.S. to obtain doctoral degrees from Andrews University in Berrien Springs, Michigan. In the United States, Ruimar studied theology at Andrews Academy and Andrews University, returning to Brazil after completing his career.

Back in Brazil, Ruimar met Margareth Ottoni, and they both married on 22 December 1988. The couple had two children: Larisson (born 1 March 1992), and Melissa (born 25 September 1993). Around 1997, the DePaivas moved permanently to the United States, settling in Michigan. The family spent the next years adapting to American culture, with the DePaiva children quickly learning English and making friends.

In June 2002, upon receiving his master's degree from Andrews, Ruimar was asked to move with his family to Palau, a country in the Pacific Ocean, to work in the Adventist mission in Koror, where the church had an active and prominent role. The family accepted and moved to Palau that month, with Ruimar working full-time for the mission and Margareth working as a teacher at a local school.

== Murders ==
On 21 December 2003, Justin Hirosi, a man in his early 40s who worked for the principal at the school where Margareth taught, spent the hours after work smoking crystal methamphetamine. He decided to commit a burglary at the DePaiva residence, where he allegedly intended to steal a TV set and a video player. He later admitted having watched the family for days when he walked by for work.

At around 3 a.m. (local time) on 22 December 2003, Hirosi broke into the DePaiva's home. He proceeded to stab and kill both Ruimar and Margareth DePaiva, as well as 11-year-old Larisson. The daughter, 10-year-old Melissa, was awakened by a strong noise in the hallway; when she went to see what happened, she was kidnapped by Hirosi, who, according to Melissa's testimony, blindfolded her, tied her hands and put her into the trunk of his car. He took the girl to his home and assaulted her.

Hirosi left for work the following morning but, fearing the discovery of his crimes, he returned that afternoon to his home and asked Melissa what he should do with her. The girl begged him to take her to the church, but Hirosi blindfolded her and put her into his car's trunk instead. He subsequently took Melissa to a ravine, where he strangled her before pushing the girl down the road, leaving her for dead.

Melissa survived the fall and managed to climb up to the road, where two elderly locals found her and called the police. Hirosi was arrested and charged with a total of 20 counts, including three counts of second-degree murder, kidnapping, rape, sodomy, child sexual abuse, and indecent assault. He initially entered a plea of not guilty by reason of insanity in January 2004, but he was eventually sentenced to life in prison for each count of murder (three life sentences).

== Reactions and funerals ==
The murders were met with shock by Palauan society, which is not used to violent crime. President Thomas Remengesau Jr. called the killings a "shocking tragedy and heinous crime that has never been experienced in the republic before." Remengesau apologized on behalf of Palauans and urged the country to fight harder against drugs and to strengthen their dedication to family and the community.

Similar feelings were expressed by Senator Surangel S. Whipps (father of president Surangel Whipps Jr.) who said that while "there's nothing [we] can do", he wanted to apologize on behalf of the country and further added how "very sorry" Palauans were. Whipps spoke at the family's funeral in Palau and another private funeral in Keene, Texas, where Ruimar had relatives who claimed the bodies. In one of the services, Whipps read a statement from President Remengesau, declaring 22 December a national day of mourning in Palau.

The president of the Seventh-day Adventist Church Jan Paulsen conveyed condolences on behalf of the Adventist global community and called on church members to keep the church of Koror in their prayers. Gloria Salii, the traditional chief of Koror, also expressed regrets on behalf of Palauans and accompanied the family in the first funeral.

Ruth DePaiva, Melissa's grandmother, flew to Palau from Sudan, where she and her husband were on a church mission. In Palau, Ruth visited Hirosi in prison and offered him the family's forgiveness, while urging him to give his "sick mind" to Jesus Christ for healing. She later met with Hirosi's mother and offered her comfort.

== Aftermath ==
Following the murders, 10-year-old Melissa remained in hospital to treat her injuries, after which she returned to the United States, where she lived in Berrien Springs with her uncle and aunt who left their jobs at University of Montemorelos in Mexico to live with her in Michigan. Some time later, Melissa's paternal grandparents joined her in the U.S.

Melissa and her grandparents later moved to Dallas, where Melissa studied at the Southwestern Adventist University, receiving a nursing degree. She met fellow church member Michael Gibson and they both married in July 2016 in Texas. Shortly afterward, the couple settled in Berrien Springs, Michigan, where Gibson attended a seminary following his graduation in theology.

In November 2018, Melissa travelled to Palau along her grandparents and husband, where she was received with honors by chief Salii and the local Adventist community. Before arriving in Palau, Melissa had attended a seminary in Guam, a U.S. territory which saw itself deeply affected by the DePaivas murders. Hirosi, serving life in prison, had become religious over time and wrote several letters to Melissa and her family. He was baptized in prison and asked them to visit him in prison while they were in Palau.

While initially reluctant to visit Hirosi, Melissa went to the prison along with other church missionaries and local officials, including Surangel Whipps Jr. (later President of Palau). She was received by a police officer who had taken care of her when she was rescued in 2003. During the meeting, Hirosi apologized to Melissa and Ruth, and they prayed together.

In March 2022, a documentary titled Return to Palau premiered in Palau, with thousands of attendees, including President Whipps Jr., as well as traditional chief Salii and former president Remengesau. Before her second visit to the country, President Whipps declared Melissa and the DePaivas a "family of Palau." It was featured at Andrews University in April 2022.

Melissa's grandparents, Ruth and Itamar, died in 2023 and 2025, respectively.
