= Corruption in Palau =

Corruption in Palau describes the prevention and occurrence of corruption in Palau. While not as pervasive as some Pacific Island countries, corruption in Palau is still a significant problem as it affects governance, economic development, and public trust. The country has existing legal frameworks and institutions that combat corruption but challenges persist particularly in the area of implementation and enforcement of anti-corruption initiatives.

== Corruption cases ==
Perhaps one of the most celebrated corruption scandals in Palau occurred from 1983 to 1984 and involved the International Power Systems Company, Ltd. (IPSECO) for a $27.5 million power plant and fuel storage facility. Several high-ranking officials allegedly received a total of $750,000 from the British company in exchange for the awarding of a special contract without competitive bidding or a feasibility study. The amount, which according to the U.S. General Accounting Office ballooned to about $1 million became part of the country’s 40 million debt from IPSECO. The case highlighted not just systemic governance issues, including the misuse of public funds but also impunity. Specific prosecutions and convictions related to this case remain unclear due to the lack of criminal and civil laws that penalize conflict of interest and corruption violations. Aside from the IPSECO incident, there are rare cases of reported bribery and clear embezzlement in Palau.

=== Petty corruption ===
Petty corruption is still a major concern in Palau. In 2020, the former Governor of Koror, Franco Bares Gibbons, was found guilty on multiple counts, including misconduct in public office and misuse of government property, which suggests potential abuse of position for personal gain, a form of corruption. The following year, a report indicated that the former governor of Ngiwal State, Ellender Ngirameketii, was found guilty on several charges, including misconduct in public office and code of ethics violations. One of the challenges in addressing the problem is Palau’s small population. Transparency International noted that people are reluctant to correct, discipline, or report that a friend, relative, or co-worker is engaging in corrupt practice.

=== Misuse of public funds ===
The severity of the problem concerning the misuse of public funds in Palau is demonstrated when the country’s Special Prosecutor threatened to file lawsuits against nearly all members of the Congress for illegal use of travel funds in 2002 and 2003. As a result, the Congress passed a bill eliminating his office. It was subsequently vetoed by President Thomas Remengesau Jr. but it was overridden by the Congress. The Special Prosecutor’s office was retained after a flurry of negotiations that ended in a compromise.

Another notable example of the misuse of public funds in Palau involved former Angaur State Governor Marvin Ngirutang. He was convicted of misappropriating funds allocated for the Regina IV boat repair project. It was revealed that Ngirutang used state funds for personal travel, meals, and other unjustified expenses, violating national travel policies. He admitted to theft and ethics violations, agreeing to pay back $72,905.53 and complete 629 hours of community service.

There is also the case of the Palau Public Utilities Corporation (PPUC). It was alleged that public money intended for infrastructure improvements was misused. Reports indicated that funds were diverted through fraudulent contracts and inflated invoices, depriving citizens of essential services.

== Anti-corruption measures ==
Palau has adopted legal and institutional frameworks to address corruption. One key example is the Office of the Public Auditor (OPA), which plays a pivotal role in investigating financial irregularities and ensuring proper use of public funds. This office was created by the Public Auditor Act, empowering the OPA authority to conduct audits of government agencies and programs, identifying instances of mismanagement and recommending corrective actions.

Another significant framework is the Ethics Commission, which promoted ethical conduct among public officials and preventing conflicts of interest. The Commission oversees compliance with ethical standards and investigates allegations of misconduct. Initiatives include training programs for government employees on ethical practices and the development of policies to strengthen integrity in public service.

Aside from the OPA and the Ethics Commission, the institutions involved in the prevention and prosecution of corruption cases include the Office of the Attorney General, the Office of the Special Prosecutor, the Bureau of Public Safety, the Bureau of the Public Service System, the Financial Intelligence Unit, and the Financial Institutions Commission.
