= List of current state governors in Palau =

The following table presents a listing of Palau’s state governors.

State	Name	Since
Aimeliik	Browny Simer	10 December 2019
Airai	Norman Ngiratecheboet	5 April 2022
Angaur	Natus Misech	5 November 2024
Hatohobei	Huana Nestor	16 October 2015
Kayangel	Richard Ngiraked	10 July 2020
Koror (List)	Eyos Rudimch	11 January 2022
Melekeok	Henaro Polloi	8 January 2016
Ngaraard	Sharp Sakuma	12 January 2022
Ngarchelong	Dwight Ngiraibai	12 October 2018
Ngardmau	Johnston Blesoch Aderkeroi	5 January 2017
Ngatpang	Jersey Iyar	4 January 2019
Ngchesar	Duane Hideo	5 January 2022
Ngeremlengui	Ilolang Sisca Vogt	6 January 2016
Ngiwal	Francisco Melaitau	1 September 2020
Peleliu (List)	Emais Roberts	1 January 2022
Sonsorol	Lucy Pedro	1 May 2024

== See also ==
- List of presidents of Palau
- List of current heads of state and government
