= Opensignal =

Mobile and broadband network analytics company

Opensignal, Inc.
- Industry: Telecommunications, Data analytics
- Founded: 2010
- Headquarters: Boston, Massachusetts, United States
- Key people: Charles Rutstein (CEO)
- Website: www.opensignal.com

Opensignal is an independent mobile analytics company headquartered in Boston, with major regional offices in London, Victoria, and Singapore. The company specializes in quantifying the global consumer network experience by providing data and insights into the performance of mobile and broadband operators worldwide.

== Overview ==
Opensignal utilizes a crowdsourced data collection model to measure the real-world experiences of subscribers. Unlike traditional drive testing or simulated engineering tests, the company's methodology focuses on how users experience networks in their everyday lives, including activities such as web browsing, video streaming, and multiplayer online gaming.

The company's analytics are used by:

- Operators: To drive commercial strategies, improve network performance, and benchmark against competitors.
- Regulators: To evaluate digital services and set national standards for connectivity.
- Financial Analysts: To judge the impact of infrastructure investments and identify market trends.

== Methodology ==
Opensignal collects data through its own mobile applications and partner apps, recording billions of measurements from real users globally. This "user-centric" approach is designed to reflect the actual quality of service received by consumers across different locations and times of day.

=== Key metrics ===
The company reports on several specific pillars of network experience:

- Video Experience: Measures the quality of video streamed to mobile devices by assessing loading times, stalling, and resolution.
- Live Gaming: Evaluates how mobile network conditions affect multiplayer mobile gaming, focusing on latency, jitter, and packet loss.
- Voice App Experience: Quantifies the quality of experience for over-the-top (OTT) voice services like WhatsApp, Skype, and Facebook Messenger.
- Download and Upload Speed: Represents the average speeds users experience across different network generations (3G, 4G, and 5G).
- Reliability: Measures the consistency with which users can connect to and perform tasks on the network.

== Products and solutions ==
Opensignal offers a suite of cloud-based solutions for the telecommunications industry:

- ONX Mobile and Broadband: Analytical tools for technical and commercial leaders to improve network experience.
- Subscriber Analytics: Insights into subscriber behavior and market impact.
- Brand Licensing: Allows operators to use Opensignal's independent data to validate marketing claims.
- Global Network Excellence Index: As of 2026, this quarterly benchmark assesses how mobile networks support modern digital life across various countries.

== History ==
Founded in 2010 (originally as OpenSignalMaps), the company was established to provide transparency in the mobile industry. In September 2021, Opensignal was acquired by Comlinkdata (backed by Berkshire Partners), forming a combined entity focused on integrated network experience and market performance analytics. Following the acquisition, the company consolidated its global headquarters in Boston while maintaining its original European base in London and expanding its presence in the Asia-Pacific region through its Singapore office.
