= Yutaka Gibbons =

Palauan activist and politician (1944–2021)

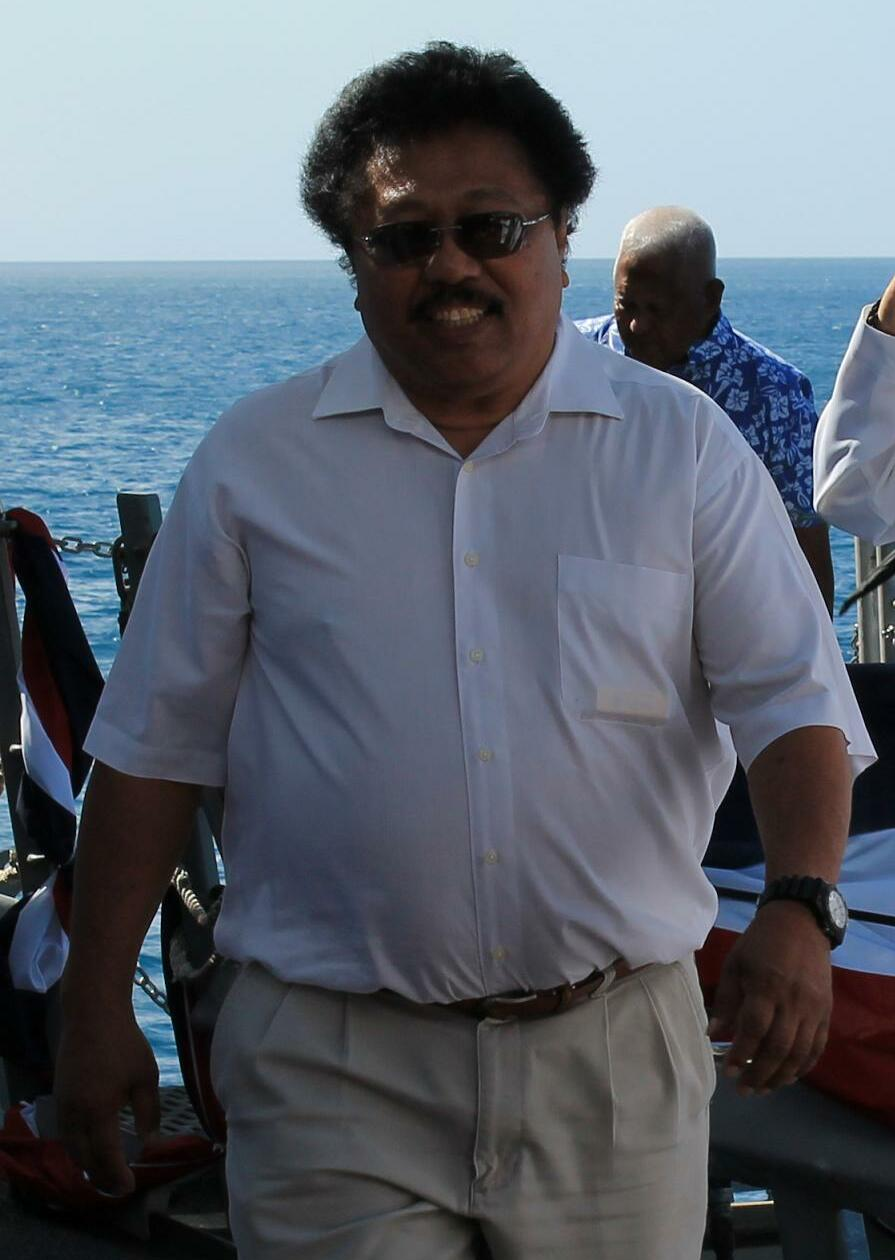
- Gibbons in 2013

Ibedul of Koror
- Reign: 1973 – November 4, 2021
- Predecessor: Ngoriakl
- Successor: Alexander Merep
- Born: Yutaka Miller Gibbons; January 17, 1944
- Died: November 4, 2021 (aged 77)

Yutaka Miller Gibbons (17 January 1944 – 4 November 2021) was the ibedul of Koror from 1973 until his death in 2021. He was also an anti–nuclear weapons activist and political candidate.

== Early and personal life ==
Gibbons was born in Palau in 1944. He was of English, Chinese and royal Palauan descent. His younger sister Gloria Salii holds the title of bilung which the female counterpart of ibedul and makes her the highest ranking female chief in Palau. His brother John C. Gibbons was governor of Koror and his other brother Alexander Merep succeeded him as ibedul.

== Career ==
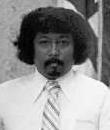
Gibbons c. 1978

He worked as a United States Army cook before becoming paramount chief and his sudden departure to become a member of nobility shocked members of his unit at the Presidio of San Francisco as well as others he had earlier served with in West Germany. Gibbons recalled his captain shaking his hand and saying "why didn't you tell us who you were?". When he arrived in Palau, he spent 30 days in isolation except for daily sessions with his instructor. He was then inducted as Ibedul in ceremonies that included washing his hands in turtle blood which he stated was for purification. Being Ibedul of Koror gave him authority over a large part of Babeldaob, the largest island in Palau. He was opposed to the presence of American nuclear weapons in Palau. In 1979, a constitution was approved that prohibited the use, testing, storage or disposal of nuclear, chemical and biological weapons in Palau. He won the Right Livelihood Award in 1983. He ran for president in the 1984, 1988 and 1996 Palauan general election.

In 1997, he approved the new flag of Koror. In August 2004, he had to pay $92,754.89 in damages to attorney Mathew Johnson and his wife for assaulting Johnson, though he was later granted a full pardon by President Thomas Remengesau. In December 2016, he sued the Governor of Koror Yositaka Adachi for allegedly prohibiting him and the Koror House of Traditional Leaders from performing their roles and functions by eliminating Gibbons' designated parking space at the new Koror State Capital Complex and cutting off the phone and the internet of the traditional leaders. He died in a Taiwanese hospital on November 4, 2021 at the age of 77. Following his death there was an ibedul succession dispute.

== Filmography ==
Film
Year	Title	Role	Notes	Ref.
1984	Strategic Trust: The Making of a Nuclear Free Palau	Himself	Documentary	
