= Gloria Salii =

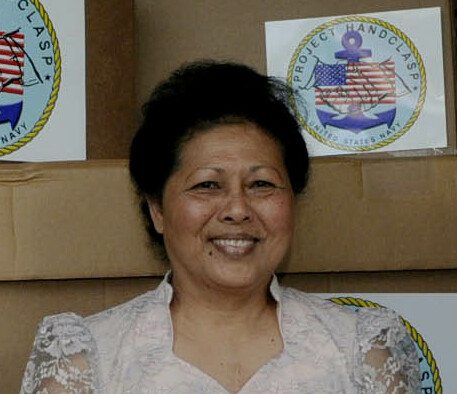
- Salii in 2010

Bilung of Koror
- Reign: 1975 – present
- Predecessor: Bilung Ngerdoko (grandmother)
- Born: 1950 or 1951 (age 75–76)
- Spouse: Michael Littler
- Issue: James Lebuu Littler

Gloria Salii (born 1950 or 1951) is the Bilung of Koror which is the female counterpart of ibedul and highest ranking female chief title in Palau.

== Life ==
She became the Bilung after the passing of her grandmother, Bilung Ngerdoko, in 1975. After the death of her older brother High Chief (ibedul) of Koror Yutaka Gibbons, there was a succession dispute between Salii, on behalf of her son James Lebuu Littler, and her brother Alexander Merep.

== Personal life ==
Her family are of English, Chinese and royal Palauan descent. She is married to Michael Littler, an administrator in the Palauan educational system and their son was born in 1978. She is the sister of the former ibedul of Koror Yutaka Gibbons, Governor of Koror John C. Gibbons and the current ibedul Alexander Merep. Salii is a member of the Seventh-day Adventist Church. Salii accompanied Melissa DePaiva following the murder of her family in Palau in December 2003.
