= Ngoriakl =

Ibedul of Koror
- Reign: 1958–1972
- Predecessor: Mariur
- Successor: Yutaka Gibbons
- Died: 1972

Ngoriakl was the ibedul of Koror (Palau) from 1958 to 1972.

== Life ==
Ngoriakl died in 1972 and his body arrived in Palau on September 30, 1972 where funeral ceremonies took place in which Thomas Remengesau delivered the eulogy. Takeo Ishida, Chief of Japanese Graves Mission, posthumously honoured him by giving him the Fourth Class Order of the Sacred Treasure which was presented to his widow in October 1972.
