= Louch =

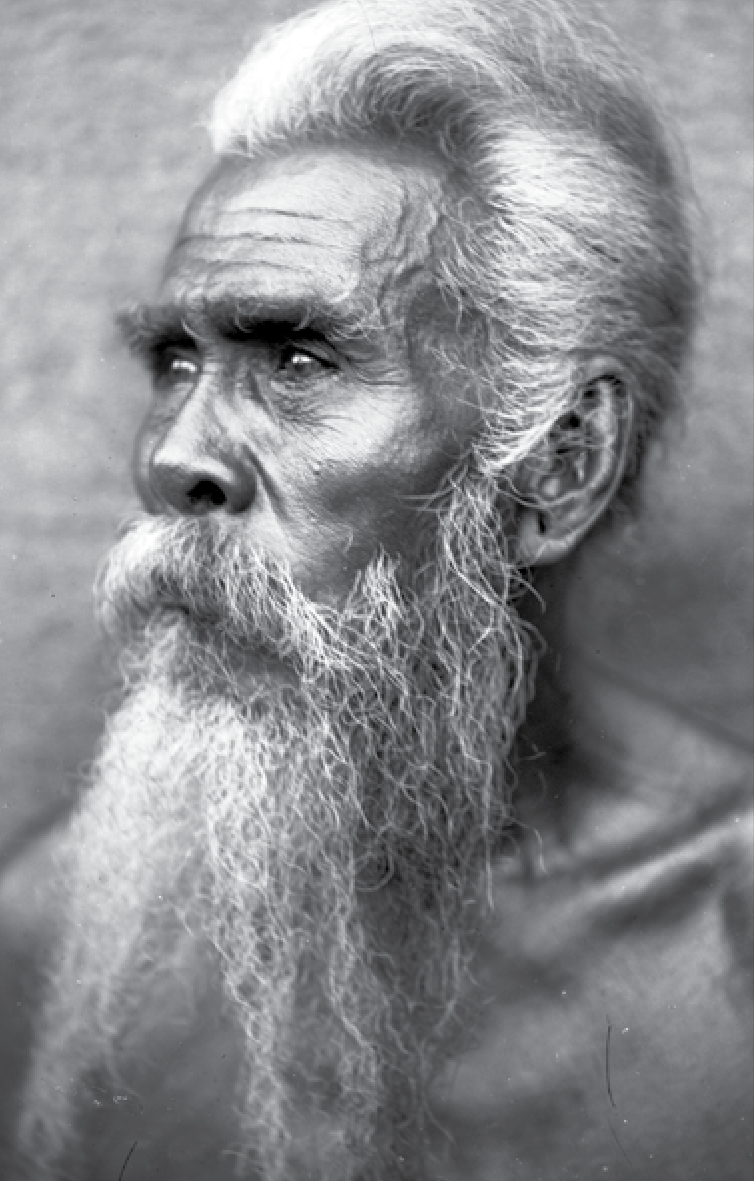

Ibedul of Koror
- Reign: 1911 – 1917
- Predecessor: Ilengelekei
- Successor: Tem
- Died: 1917

Louch was the High Chief (ibedul) of Koror in German New Guinea from 1911 to 1917.

== Life ==
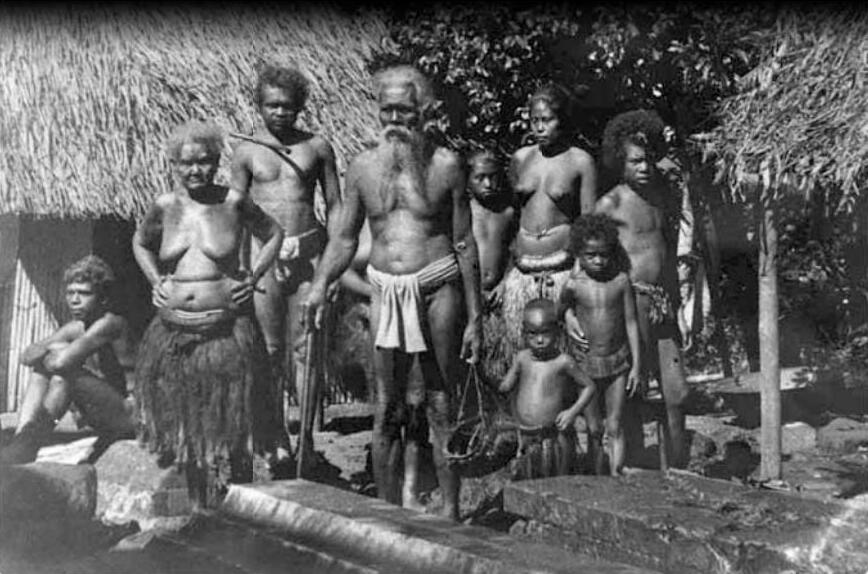
Ibedul Louch and his family

Louch divided his land between his adopted son Umong, daughter Ibuuch, step-daughter Ross and Dirrablong who was "like a child" to him. A dispute over the ownership of the land occurred between Ibuuch, Dirrablong and their successors which resulted in litigation before Japanese courts, as Palau was a part of the South Seas Mandate at the time, where it was ruled that, among others, lot number 1459 and 1460 were owned by Dirrablong and her descendants.
