= Thrust-to-weight ratio =

Dimensionless ratio of thrust to weight of a propelled vehicle

Thrust-to-weight ratio is a dimensionless ratio of thrust to weight of a reaction engine or a vehicle with such an engine. Reaction engines include jet engines, rocket engines, pump-jets, Hall-effect thrusters, and ion thrusters, among others. These generate thrust by expelling mass (propellant) in the opposite direction of intended motion, in accordance with Newton's third law. A related but distinct metric is the power-to-weight ratio, which applies to engines or systems that deliver mechanical, electrical, or other forms of power rather than direct thrust.

In many applications, the thrust-to-weight ratio serves as an indicator of performance. The ratio in a vehicle’s initial state is often cited as a figure of merit, enabling quantitative comparison across different vehicles or engine designs. The instantaneous thrust-to-weight ratio of a vehicle can vary during operation due to factors such as fuel consumption (which reduces mass) or changes in gravitational acceleration, for example in orbital or interplanetary contexts.

== Calculation ==
Thrust-to-weight from mass (assuming standard gravity)
Thrust	1500 N
Mass	17.1 kg
TWR	~8.945

The thrust-to-weight ratio of an engine or vehicle is calculated by dividing its thrust by its weight (not to be confused with mass). The formula is:

$\mathrm{TWR} = \frac{T}{W} = \frac{T}{m \cdot g}$

where:

- $T$ is the thrust, in newtons (N), kilograms-force (kgf), or pounds-force (lbf),
- $W$ is the weight, in newtons (N), which can also be expressed as the product of:
  - mass $m$, in kilograms (kg) or pounds (lb), and
  - gravitational acceleration $g$, e.g., the standard gravitational acceleration on Earth of 9.80665 m/s^{2}.

For valid comparison of the initial thrust-to-weight ratio of two or more engines or vehicles, thrust must be measured under controlled conditions. Because an aircraft's weight can vary considerably, depending on factors such as munition load, fuel load, cargo weight, or even the weight of the pilot, the thrust-to-weight ratio is also variable and even changes during flight operations. There are several standards for determining the weight of an aircraft used to calculate the thrust-to-weight ratio range.

- Empty weight – The weight of the aircraft minus fuel, munitions, cargo, and crew.
- Combat weight – Primarily for determining the performance capabilities of fighter aircraft, it is the weight of the aircraft with full munitions and missiles, half fuel, and no drop tanks or bombs.
- Max takeoff weight – The weight of the aircraft when fully loaded with the maximum fuel and cargo that it can safely takeoff with.

== Aircraft ==
The thrust-to-weight ratio and lift-to-drag ratio are the two most important parameters in determining the performance of an aircraft.

The thrust-to-weight ratio varies continually during a flight. Thrust varies with throttle setting, airspeed, altitude, air temperature, etc. Weight varies with fuel burn and payload changes. For aircraft, the quoted thrust-to-weight ratio is often the maximum static thrust at sea level divided by the maximum takeoff weight. Aircraft with thrust-to-weight ratio greater than 1:1 can pitch straight up and maintain airspeed until performance decreases at higher altitude.

A plane can take off even if the thrust is less than its weight as, unlike a rocket, the lifting force is produced by lift from the wings, not directly by thrust from the engine. As long as the aircraft can produce enough thrust to travel at a horizontal speed above its stall speed, the wings will produce enough lift to counter the weight of the aircraft.

$$\left(\frac{T}{W}\right)_\text{cruise} = \left(\frac{D}{L}\right)_\text{cruise} = \frac{1}{\left(\frac{L}{D}\right)_\text{cruise}}.$$

=== Propeller-driven aircraft ===
For propeller-driven aircraft, the thrust-to-weight ratio can be calculated as follows in imperial units:

$$\frac{T}{W} = \frac{550\eta_\mathrm{p}}{V} \frac{\text{hp}}{W},$$

where $\eta_\mathrm{p}\;$ is propulsive efficiency (typically 0.65 for wooden propellers, 0.75 metal fixed pitch and up to 0.85 for constant-speed propellers), hp is the engine's shaft horsepower, and $V\;$is true airspeed in feet per second, weight is in lbs.

The metric formula is:

$$\frac{T}{W}=\left(\frac{\eta_\mathrm{p}}{V}\right)\left(\frac{P}{W}\right).$$

== Rockets ==
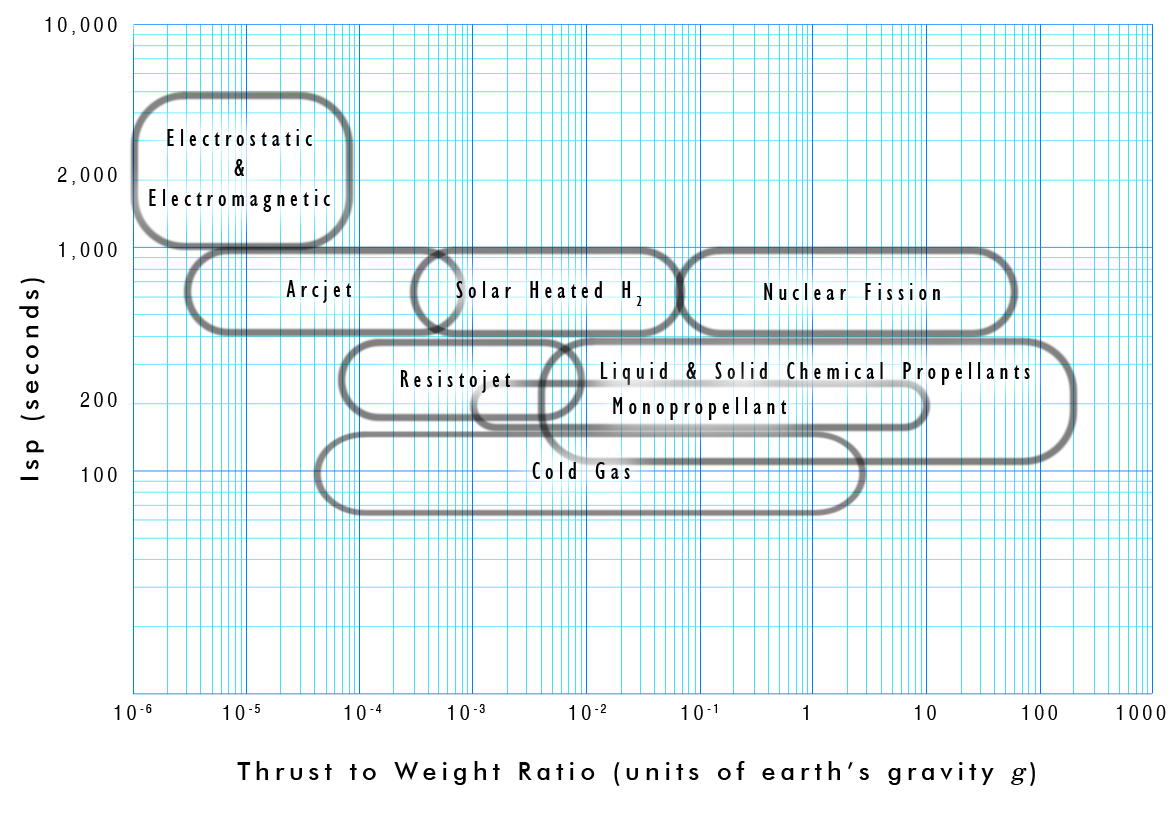
Rocket vehicle thrust-to-weight ratio vs specific impulse for different propellant technologies

The thrust-to-weight ratio of a rocket, or rocket-propelled vehicle, is an indicator of its acceleration expressed in multiples of gravitational acceleration g.

Rockets and rocket-propelled vehicles operate in a wide range of gravitational environments, including the weightless environment. The thrust-to-weight ratio is usually calculated from initial gross weight at sea level on earth and is sometimes called thrust-to-Earth-weight ratio. The thrust-to-Earth-weight ratio of a rocket or rocket-propelled vehicle is an indicator of its acceleration expressed in multiples of earth's gravitational acceleration, g_{0}.

The thrust-to-weight ratio of a rocket improves as the propellant is burned. With constant thrust, the maximum ratio (maximum acceleration of the vehicle) is achieved just before the propellant is fully consumed. Each rocket has a characteristic thrust-to-weight curve, or acceleration curve, not just a scalar quantity.

The thrust-to-weight ratio of an engine is greater than that of the complete launch vehicle, but is nonetheless useful because it determines the maximum acceleration that any vehicle using that engine could theoretically achieve with minimum propellant and structure attached.

For a takeoff from the surface of the earth using thrust and no aerodynamic lift, the thrust-to-weight ratio for the whole vehicle must be greater than one. In general, the thrust-to-weight ratio is numerically equal to the g-force that the vehicle can generate. Take-off can occur when the vehicle's g-force exceeds local gravity (expressed as a multiple of g_{0}).

The thrust-to-weight ratio of rockets typically greatly exceeds that of airbreathing jet engines because the comparatively far greater density of rocket fuel eliminates the need for much engineering materials to pressurize it.

Many factors affect thrust-to-weight ratio. The instantaneous value typically varies over the duration of flight with the variations in thrust due to speed and altitude, together with changes in weight due to the amount of remaining propellant, and payload mass. Factors with the greatest effect include freestream air temperature, pressure, density, and composition. Depending on the engine or vehicle under consideration, the actual performance will often be affected by buoyancy and local gravitational field strength.

== Examples ==
=== Aircraft ===
Vehicle	thrust-weight ratio	Notes
Northrop Grumman B-2 Spirit	0.205	Max take-off weight, full power
Airbus A340-300 Enhanced	0.2229	Max take-off weight, full power
Airbus A380	0.227	Max take-off weight, full power
Boeing 747-8	0.269	Max take-off weight, full power
Boeing 777-200ER	0.285	Max take-off weight, full power
Boeing 737 MAX 8	0.311	Max take-off weight, full power
Airbus A320neo	0.310	Max take-off weight, full power
Boeing 757-200	0.341	Max take-off weight, full power (w/Rolls-Royce RB211)
Tupolev 154B	0.360	Max take-off weight, full power (w/Kuznetsov NK-8-2)
Tupolev Tu-160	0.363	Max take-off weight, full afterburners
Concorde	0.372	Max take-off weight, full afterburners
Rockwell International B-1 Lancer	0.38	Max take-off weight, full afterburners
HESA Kowsar	0.61	With full fuel, afterburners.
BAE Hawk	0.65	
Lightning F.6	0.702	Max take-off weight, full afterburners
Lockheed Martin F-35 A	0.87	With full fuel (1.07 with 50% fuel, 1.19 with 25% fuel)
HAL Tejas Mk 1	1.07	With full fuel
CAC/PAC JF-17 Thunder	1.07	With full fuel
Dassault Rafale	1.028 (1.219 with loaded weight & 50% internal fuel)	Version C, 100% fuel
Sukhoi Su-30MKM	1.00	Loaded weight with 56% internal fuel
McDonnell Douglas F-15	1.04	Nominally loaded
Mikoyan MiG-29	1.09	Full internal fuel, 4 AAMs
Lockheed Martin F-22	>1.09 (1.26 with loaded weight and 50% fuel)	
General Dynamics F-16	1.096 (1.24 with loaded weight & 50% fuel)	
Hawker Siddeley Harrier	1.1	VTOL
Eurofighter Typhoon	1.15	Interceptor configuration
Space Shuttle	1.3	Take-off
Simorgh (rocket)	1.83	
Space Shuttle	3	Peak

=== Jet and rocket engines ===
Engine	Mass	Thrust, vacuum		Thrust-to- weight ratio
Engine	Mass	(kN)	(lbf)	Thrust-to- weight ratio
MD-TJ42 powered sailplane jet engine	3.85kg (8.48 lb)	0.35	78.7	9.09
RD-0410 nuclear rocket engine	2,000 kg (4,400 lb)	35.2	7,900	1.8
Pratt & Whitney J58 jet engine (Lockheed SR-71 Blackbird)	2,722 kg (6,001 lb)	150	34,000	5.6
Rolls-Royce/Snecma Olympus 593 turbojet with reheat (Concorde)	3,175 kg (7,000 lb)	169.2	38,000	5.4
Williams FJ33-5A	140 kg (310 lb)	8.21	1,846	5.98
Williams F107	30 kg (66 lb)	1.9	430	6.46
Pratt & Whitney F119	1,800 kg (4,000 lb)	91	20,500	7.95
PBS TJ40-G1NS jet engine	3.6 kg (7.9 lb)	0.425	96	12.04
RD-0750 rocket engine three-propellant mode	4,621 kg (10,188 lb)	1,413	318,000	31.2
RD-0146 rocket engine	260 kg (570 lb)	98	22,000	38.4
Rocketdyne RS-25 rocket engine (Space Shuttle Main Engine)	3,177 kg (7,004 lb)	2,278	512,000	73.1
RD-180 rocket engine	5,393 kg (11,890 lb)	4,152	933,000	78.7
RD-170 rocket engine	9,750 kg (21,500 lb)	7,887	1,773,000	82.5
F-1 (Saturn V first stage)	8,391 kg (18,499 lb)	7,740.5	1,740,100	94.1
NK-33 rocket engine	1,222 kg (2,694 lb)	1,638	368,000	136.7
SpaceX Raptor 3 rocket engine	1,525 kg (3,362 lb)	2,746	617,000	183.6
Merlin 1D rocket engine, full-thrust version	467 kg (1,030 lb)	914	205,500	199.5

=== Fighter aircraft ===
Thrust-to-weight ratios, fuel weights, and weights of different fighter planes
Specifications	F-15K (Note: Pratt & Whitney engines)	F-15C	MiG-29K	MiG-29B	JF-17	J-10	F-35A	F-35B	F-35C	F-22	LCA Mk-1
Engines thrust, maximum (N)	259,420 (2)	208,622 (2)	176,514 (2)	162,805 (2)	84,400 (1)	122,580 (1)	177,484 (1)	177,484 (1)	177,484 (1)	311,376 (2)	84,516 (1)
Aircraft mass, empty (kg)	17,010	14,379	12,723	10,900	7,965	09,250	13,290	14,515	15,785	19,673	6,560
Aircraft mass, full fuel (kg)	23,143	20,671	17,963	14,405	11,365	13,044	21,672	20,867	24,403	27,836	9,500
Aircraft mass, max. take-off load (kg)	36,741	30,845	22,400	18,500	13,500	19,277	31,752	27,216	31,752	37,869	13,500
Total fuel mass (kg)	06,133	06,292	05,240	03,505	02,300	03,794	08,382	06,352	08,618	08,163	02,458
T/W ratio, full fuel	1.14	1.03	1.00	1.15	1.07	1.05	0.84	0.87	0.74	1.14	1.07
T/W ratio, max. take-off load	0.72	0.69	0.80	0.89	0.70	0.80	0.57	0.67	0.57	0.84	0.80

- Table for Jet and rocket engines: jet thrust is at sea level
- Fuel density used in calculations: 0.803 kg/l
- For the metric table, the T/W ratio is calculated by dividing the thrust by the product of the full fuel aircraft weight and the acceleration of gravity.
- J-10's engine rating is of AL-31FN.

== See also ==
- Power-to-weight ratio
- Factor of safety
