= Alexander Merep =

Ibedul of Koror
- Reign: February 22, 2022 – present
- Predecessor: Yutaka Gibbons

Alexander Merep is the High Chief (ibedul) of Koror in the Republic of Palau.

== Life ==
Merep served as the director of the Koror State Public Land Authority. He held the title rechucher-ra-techekii before being appointed by female Idid members led by Ochob Katey Ngiraked as the new Ibedul. The appointment was accepted by the ngarameketii (traditional chiefs of Koror) on February 22, 2022, and supported by the Koror hamlet chiefs. The title of ibedul is disputed by his sister Bilung Gloria Salii on behalf of her son James Lebuu Littler.

== Personal life ==
His family are of English, Chinese and royal Palauan descent. He is the brother of the former ibedul of Koror Yutaka Gibbons, Governor of Koror John C. Gibbons and bilung Gloria Salii.
