= TEMS =

TEMS, tems, or variation, may stand for:

- Tactical EMS, a type of emergency service
- Telecom Equipment Manufacturers
- TEst Mobile System, a diagnostics suite
- Timothy Edwards Middle School, South Windsor, Connecticut, United States
- Toyota Electronic Modulated Suspension
- Toronto EMS, the emergency medical services provider for the city of Toronto
- Transanal Endoscopic Mucosal Surgery, an endoscopic surgery method to remove rectal polyps

== See also ==
- Tems (born 1995), Nigerian singer
- Tem (disambiguation)
