= Flag of Koror =

Palauan state flag

Koror
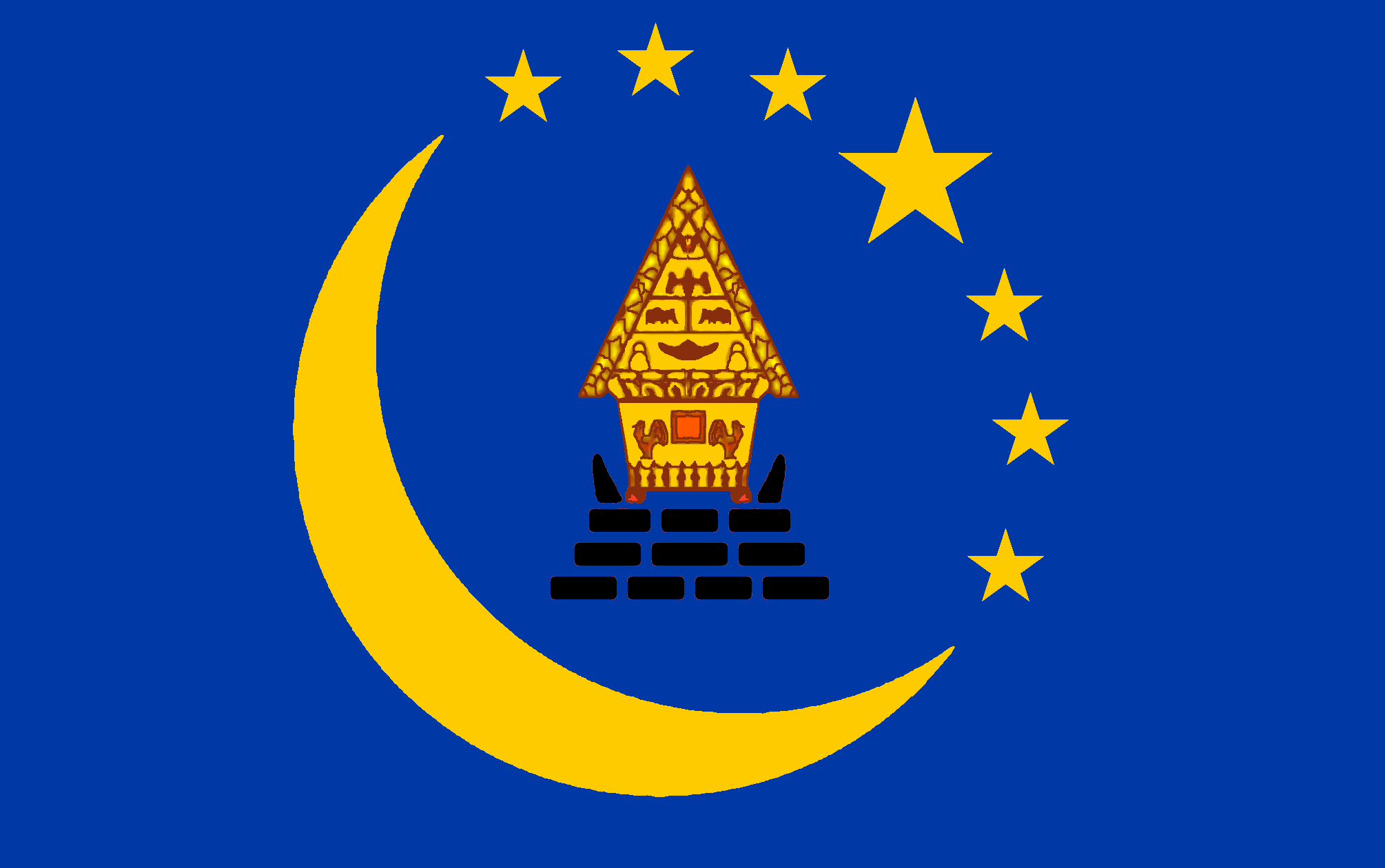
- Proportion: 1:1.667 (Note: The official ratio is 1:1.667 (0.59988002399), the ratio is sometimes simplified as 3:5 (0.6))
- Adopted: 25 July 1997
- Design: A dark blue field with a crescent moon, seven stars and a bai on top of ten stones

The flag of Koror was approved on 10 July 1997 by Yutaka Gibbons and was officially adopted on 25 July 1997.

== Description ==
The flag's specific construction details are that the width of the flag shall bear a ratio to its length of 1 to 1.667. The diameter of the moon/star circle shall bear a ratio to its width of the flag of 1 to 1.44. The center of the circle shall be placed vertically at the center and horizontally at 1/3 point from the left of the flag.

The blue background represents the ocean and the golden moon represents the new government. The six stars represent the six hamlets of Koror State with the larger star in the middle representing the union of the NgaraMeketii and RubekulKeldeu. The traditional bai house is on a foundation of ten stones symbolic of the ten traditional chiefs.

== See also ==
- Flags of the states of Palau
