= Yukiwo P. Dengokl =

Palauan politician

Yukiwo P. Dengokl (born November 25, 1955) is a member of the Senate of Palau. He grew up in both Palau and the Federated States of Micronesia. He is also a lawyer and attorney at law. He is the Ngiraked of Airai.

== Early life ==
Dengokl was born on November 25, 1955, as the child of Hiroshi Nakamura of Peleliu State, and Didil Dengokl of Airai State. However, he was raised by his maternal grandparents as a child.

== Education ==
He attended the George B. Harris Elementary School, and then he attended the Xavier High School in Chuuk, Micronesia. Shortly after his graduation from Santa Clara University, he became a teacher at the Pohnpei Agriculture and Trade School in the FSM. He then returned to Santa Clara to achieve a Juris Doctor degree.

== Career ==
=== Pre-congress ===
In 1989, Senator Dengokl was appointed by the late former Governor of Aimeliik State, Simer Eriich, to represent Aimeliik State in the Commission on Future Palau - U.S. Relations. The same year, he was chosen for the Judicial Nominating Commission. From 1993 to 1994, He served for the Palau Community College Board of Trustees.

=== Admission to congress ===
In the 2000 Palauan general election, he became a senator of the Palau National Congress.

=== Everett Walton incident ===
In 2007, Jackson Ngiraingas filed a 28 page complaint against special prosecutor Everett Walton. Dengokl retrieved a copy of the complaint, along with Chief Justice Arthur Ngirakelsong. He asked both Arthur and Yukiwo to investigate Everett Walton.

== Personal life ==
He is married to Carol O. Emaurois and they have one son, Odanges N. Dengokl.
