= Test Mobile System =

Test Mobile System (TEMS) is a technology used by telecom operators to measure, analyze and optimize their mobile networks. It is considered as the basic tool to perform wireless network drive testing, benchmarking, monitoring and analysis. Originally part of Field Measurement Systems and Network Planning Software divisions of Virginia, US-based LCC International Inc., it was acquired by Ericsson in 1999. The TEMS Products business was divested from Ericsson to Ascom on June 2, 2009. The TEMS Products business has been then divested to Infovista, effective October 3, 2016.
