= Koror Jail =

Palau prison

Coordinates: 7.341375°N 134.4755377°E

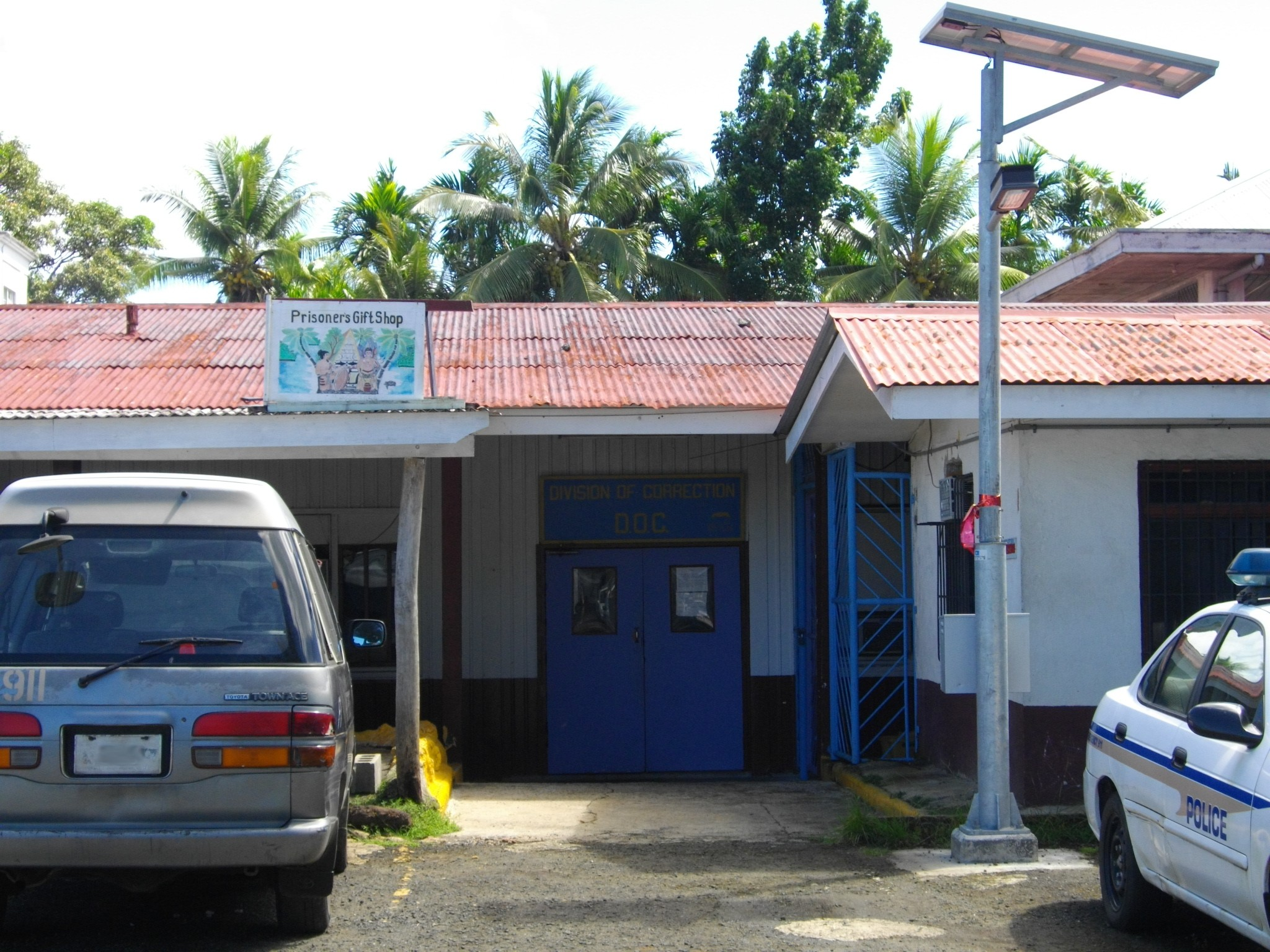
Koror Jail

Koror Jail is a prison located in Palau. It is the only prison in Palau, and it is located on the island of Koror in a governmental centre between federal office buildings and the Palau National Congress. The 1 600 m^{2} prison consists of two structures built in the 1970s and one constructed in the 1990s, and it is surrounded by an 2.4 m wire mesh fence and an 2.4 m concrete wall; a wall from the neighboring Ministry of Justice building also serves as a jail barrier.

By 2001, Koror Jail has become a tourist destination thanks to inmates who create and sell elaborate wooden storyboards at a retail facility located on the jail's grounds.
