= Tem (ibedul) =

Ibedul of Koror
- Reign: 1917 – 1943
- Predecessor: Louch
- Successor: Mariur
- Died: 1943

Tem was the High Chief (ibedul) of Koror in the South Seas Mandate from 1917 to 1943.

== Life ==
In 1924, a dispute between Ibedul Tem and the Tucherur, head of the Terekieu clan, resulted in the Idid clan dispossessing the Terekieu clan's lands and many members of Terekieu clan fleeing to Aimeliik. Tem took the title of Tucherur for himself.
