= John C. Gibbons =

Palauan politician (died 2021)

Governor of Koror
- In office 14 January 1998 – 2006
- Preceded by: Himself (as Administrator)
- Succeeded by: Yositaka Adachi

Executive Administrator of Koror
- In office 1985–1997
- Preceded by: Office established
- Succeeded by: Himself (as Governor)

Minister of Justice
- In office 2009 – 17 January 2013
- President: Johnson Toribiong
- Preceded by: Elias Camsek Chin
- Succeeded by: Antonio Bells

Personal details
- Died: 20 May 2021
- Spouse: Dirioulidid Ruth Gibbons
- Children: 2

John "Johnny" C. Gibbons (died 20 May 2021) was a Palauan politician. He was the Executive Administrator of Koror from 1985 to 1997 before serving as the first Governor of Koror from 1998 to 2006. He was the Minister of Justice from 2009 to 2013.

== Personal life and death ==
His family are of English, Chinese and royal Palauan descent. He was the brother of the former ibedul of Koror Yutaka Gibbons, current ibedul Alexander Merep and bilung Gloria Salii. He died on 20 May 2021 and is survived by his wife Dirioulidid Ruth Gibbons, his two children and grandchildren. A state funeral was held for him on 3 June 2021.

Political offices
New title	Executive Administrator of Koror; 1985–1997	Position abolished
New title	Governor of Koror; 1998–2006	Succeeded by Yositaka Adachi
Preceded by Elias Camsek Chin	Justice Minister of Palau; 2009–2013	Succeeded by Antonio Bells
