= Yositaka Adachi =

Palauan politician

Governor of Koror
- In office 2006 – 9 January 2018
- Preceded by: John C. Gibbons
- Succeeded by: Franco Gibbons

Personal details
- Born: 1961 or 1962 (age 64–65)
- Party: Independent
- Occupation: Politician

Yositaka "Yosi" Adachi (Note: Also spelled Yoshitaka.) (born 1961 or 1962) is a Palauan politician. He was the Governor of Koror for three consecutive terms from 2006 until 2018 when he stepped down due to the term limits imposed by the constitution of Koror.

== Career ==
In December 2016, Minister of Justice Antonio Bells sought his support of a proposed docking facility, building expansion and water use rights for the new Division of Marine Law Enforcement. Adachi was sued by the Ibedul of Koror Yutaka Gibbons for allegedly prohibiting him and the Koror House of Traditional Leaders from performing their roles and functions by eliminating Gibbons' designated parking space at the new Koror State Capital Complex and cutting off the phone and the internet of the traditional leaders. He ran for Vice President of Palau in the 2016 Palauan general election but lost to Raynold Oilouch. He unsuccessfully sought re-election for the office of Governor of Koror in the November 2021 election against incumbent Franco Gibbons and three other candidates.

== Personal life ==
He is of Japanese descent.

== Notes ==
Political offices
Preceded by John C. Gibbons	Governor of Koror; 2006–2018	Succeeded by Franco Gibbons
