= Malakal Island =

Island

Coordinates: 7°19′57″N 134°27′11″E

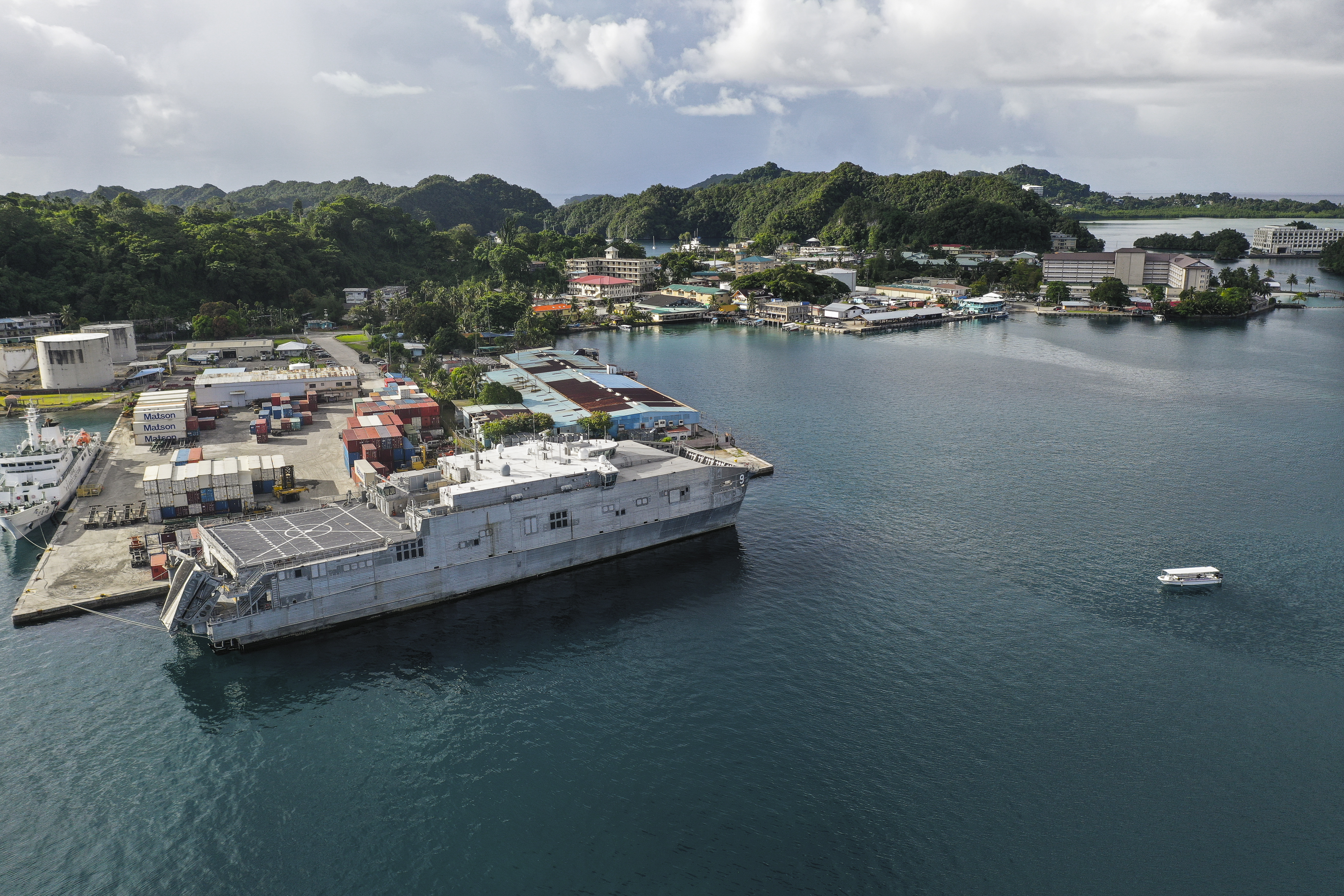
Port of Koror on Malakal Island

Malakal Island ("Ngemelachel" in Palauan) is an island in the state of Koror, Palau. It is the site of Palau's main port, Malakal Harbor, as well as its fisheries. It is linked to Koror by a causeway. The Palau Royal Resort, a luxury oceanside destination, is on Malakal Island.
