= RD-0410 =

Soviet nuclear thermal rocket engine

RD-0410 (РД-0410, GRAU index: 11B91) was a Soviet nuclear thermal rocket engine developed by the Chemical Automatics Design Bureau in Voronezh from 1965 through the 1980s using liquid hydrogen propellant. The engine was ground-tested at the Semipalatinsk Test Site, and its use was incorporated in the Kurchatov Mars 1994 crewed mission proposal.

This engine had slightly higher performance (exhaust temperature and specific impulse) over NERVA (the U.S. nuclear thermal rocket engine project). The design of the reactor core included thermal insulation between uranium carbide/tungsten carbide fuel and the zirconium hydride moderator. This allowed for a very compact reactor core design. Hydrogen flow cooled the moderator first allowing to keep very low neutron energy and high fission cross-section, then it was heated by the direct contact to the fuel rods. To prevent the chemical reaction between carbide and hydrogen, about 1 percent of hexane was added to the hydrogen after the moderator passage.

The hydrogen boost turbopump was designed by KBKhA in Voronezh.

== Reactor and engine test summary ==
Reactor	Starts	Thermal Power (MW)	Thrust (kn)	Exhaust Velocity (m/s)	Isp (s)	Burn Time (s)	Mass (kg)	Len (m)	Diam (m)
RD-0410	10	196	35.2	8920	910	3600	2000	3.5	1.6

== See also ==
- Nuclear thermal rocket
- TEM (nuclear propulsion)
- NERVA
- 9M730 Burevestnik
