= TEM (currency) =

Τοπική Εναλλακτική Μονάδα (Greek)

ISO 4217
- Code: none

Unit
- Nickname: TEM

Demographics
- Date of introduction: circa 2010
- Official user(s): None
- Unofficial users: Greece (region of Magnesia): 50 members (2010); 400 members (October 2011); 800 members (April 2012)

Issuance
- Central bank: None. (Local exchange trading system)
- Website: www.tem-magnisia.gr

TEM (Greek: Τοπική Εναλλακτική Μονάδα ("Alternative Monetary Unit"); abbrv: TEM ) is a local exchange trading system (LETS) popular in Volos, Magnesia, Greece.

== History ==
TEM launched on June 15th 2010, the currency was created in the Greek port town of Volos, as the citizens sought to adopt a local currency traded based on non-monetary contributions into the system, akin to a barter system. Wrote The Christian Science Monitor in 2012, "People sign up for a TEMs network account, see what services they might offer to other folks in their area who are in need, and start amassing credits that can be cashed in for things they themselves need. TEMs can be used for everything from bakers to babysitters, teachers to technicians. In theory, the value of one TEM is equal to the value of one Euro." Vouchers were made available for people who hadn't yet, or couldn't, create an online account. Accounts only allowed 1,200 tems to be held, to prevent hoarding. Also, no-one was allowed to owe more than 300, to prevent debt.

Among co-founders were Maria Choupis. Volos mayor Panos Skotiniotis stated the Greek Parliament had been "very supportive" of the project. Starting with 50 members, it had 800 members by 2012. By March 2012, the Guardian reported that system had been actively adopted by locals after being live for 18 months.

In 2015, it was reported the currency remained popular in Greece, especially as a downturn in Greece and limited liquidity resulted in informal bartering becoming more frequent.

== See also ==
- European sovereign-debt crisis
- Local exchange trading system
- Ovolos, a similar system in Patras, Greece.
