= TEM (nuclear propulsion) =

Nuclear propulsion project

Transport and Energy Module (TEM)
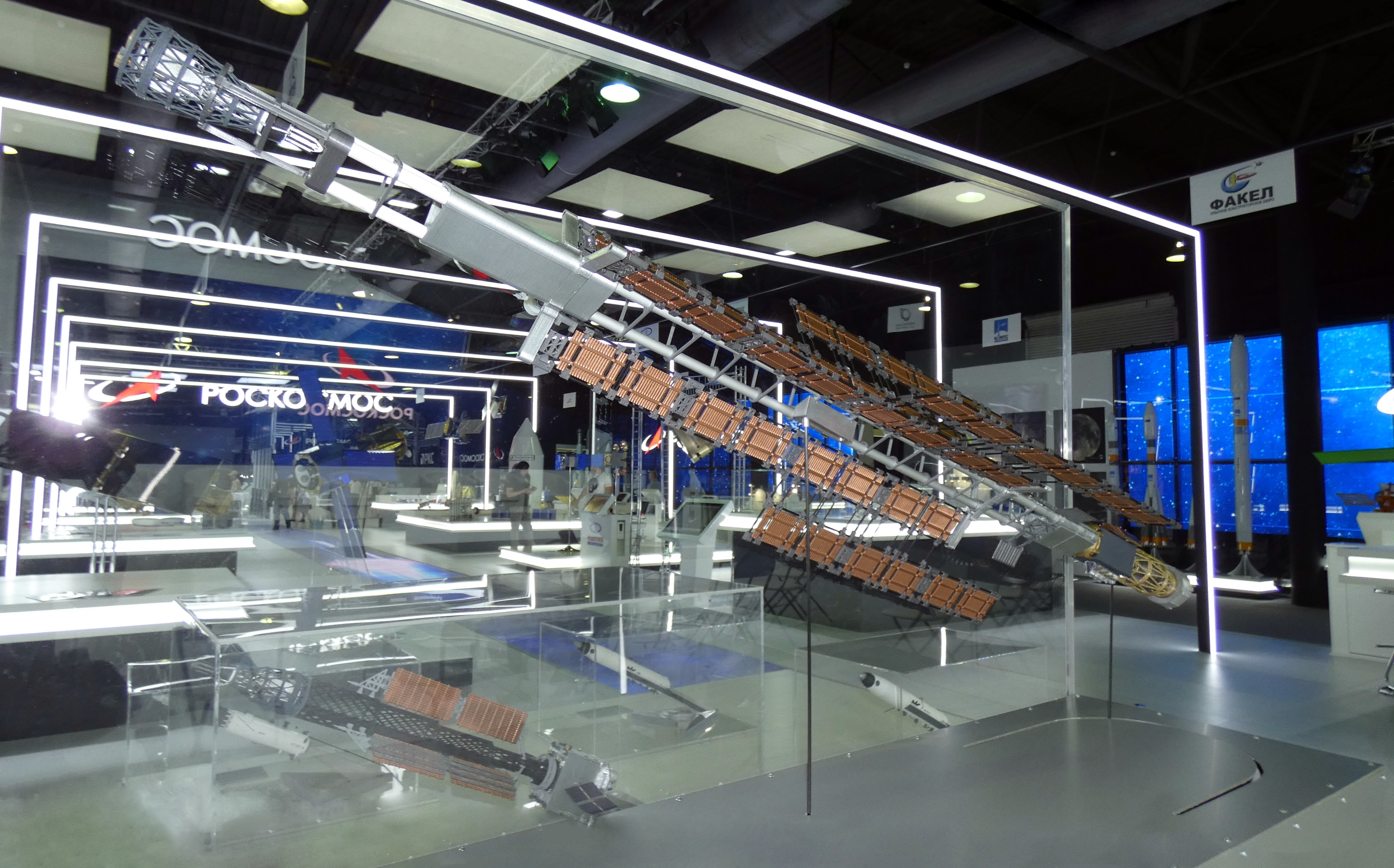
- Generation: Generation IV
- Reactor concept: Gas-cooled reactor (GCR)
- Designed by: Keldysh Research Center; Rosatom; Roscosmos; NIKIET institute
- Manufactured by: Keldysh Research Center; NIKIET institute
- Status: Under development

Main parameters of the reactor core
- Fuel (fissile material): Information missing
- Fuel state: Solid
- Neutron energy spectrum: Thermal
- Primary coolant: helium 78% - xenon 22%

Reactor usage
- Primary use: Generation of electricity for propulsion
- Power (thermal): 3.8 MW
- Power (electric): 1 MW_{e} (BWR-1)

TEM (Russian: Транспортно-энергетический модуль, "transport and energy module\unit", NPPS in English) is an under development nuclear propulsion spacecraft with the intention to facilitate the transportation of large cargoes in deep space. It will be constructed by the Russian Keldysh Research Center, NIKIET (Research and Design Institute of Power Engineering) institute, and Rosatom.

== Mission ==
A Russian project to create an uncrewed nuclear electric rocket spaceship for Solar system exploration. The first reactor tests are scheduled for the early 2020s; as of May 2020, the first orbital flight test of the reactor is planned for no earlier than 2030. The first mission, named Zeus, is envisioned to operate for 50 months and deliver payloads to the Moon, Venus, and Jupiter through multiple gravity assists.

== Specifications ==
=== Reactor ===
- Coolant: 78% helium/22% xenon.
- Heat power: 3.8 MW
- Electric power: 1 MW

=== Spacecraft ===
- Mass: 20,290 kg (limited by Angara 5 carrying capacity)
- Thrust: 18 N
- Specific impulse: 7000 s
- Space-launch vehicle: Angara

== Project history ==
- 2009 – Project started.
- March 2016 – First batch of nuclear fuel received
- October 2018 – Successful initial tests of the water droplet radiator system
- May 2021 – Zeus mission proposed by Roscosmos and the Russian Academy of Sciences

== See also ==
- Nuclear electric rocket
- Project Prometheus
- RD-0410
- 9M730 Burevestnik
