= Governor of Koror =

Head of government of Koror, Palau

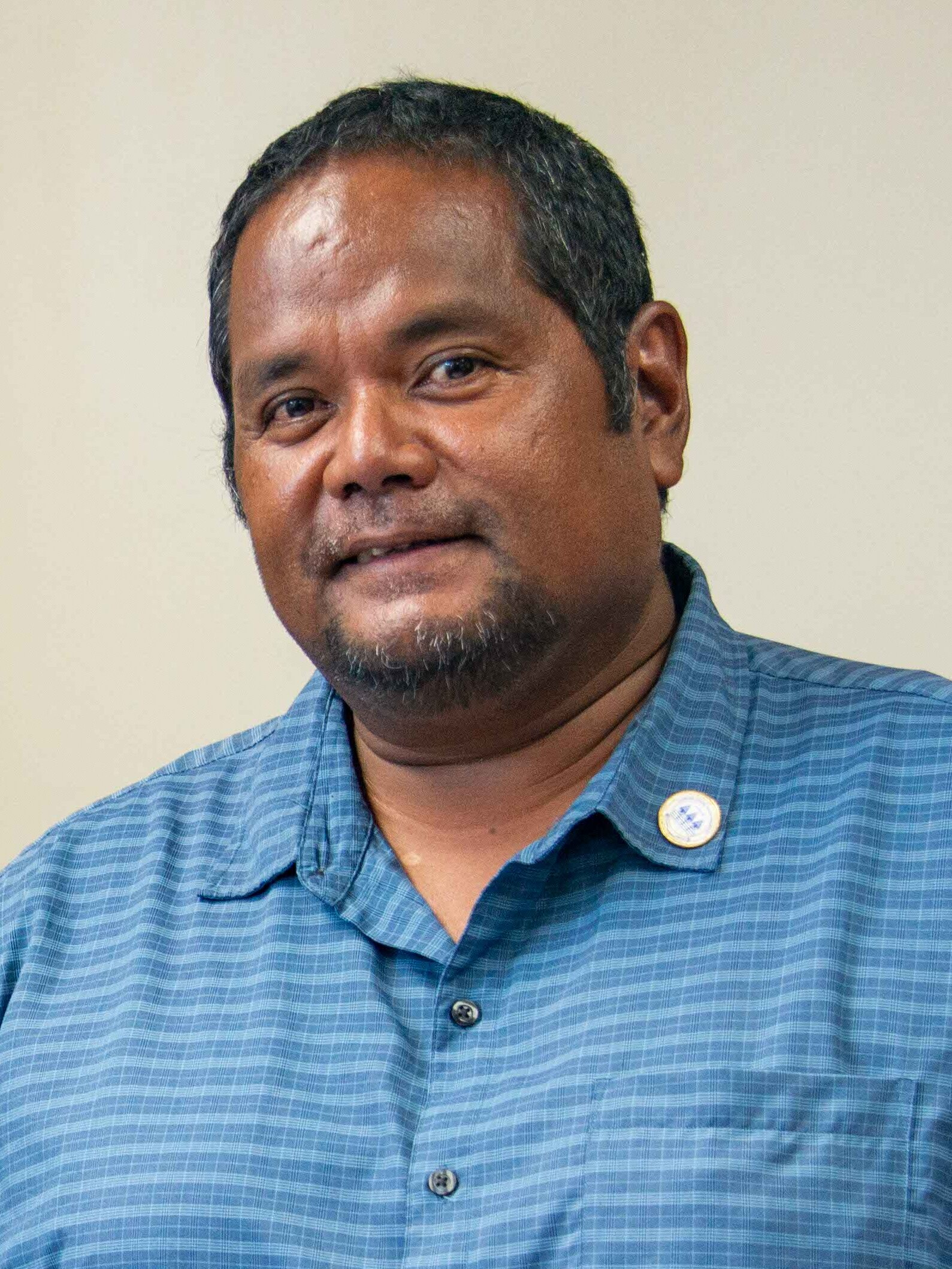
- Incumbent; Eyos Rudimch since 11 January 2022
- Term length: Four years
- Inaugural holder: John C. Gibbons
- Formation: 14 January 1998
- Website: http://www.kororstategov.com/

The governor of Koror is the head of government of Koror in the Republic of Palau. The position was established in 1998 and succeeded the position of executive administrator.

== List of officeholders ==
=== Executive administrators ===
No.	Picture	Name (Birth-Death)	Term of office		
No.	Picture	Name (Birth-Death)	Took office	Left office	Time in office
1		John C. Gibbons (died 2021)	1985	1997	12 years

=== Governors ===
No.	Picture	Name	Term of office		
No.	Picture	Name	Took office	Left office	Time in office
1		John C. Gibbons (died 2021)	14 January 1998	2006	8 years
2		Yositaka Adachi	2006	9 January 2018	12 years
3		Franco Gibbons	9 January 2018	11 January 2022	4 years, 2 days
4		Eyos Rudimch	11 January 2022	Incumbent	4 years, 292 days

== See also ==
- List of current state governors in Palau
