= Traditional chiefs of Palau =

Palauan leaders

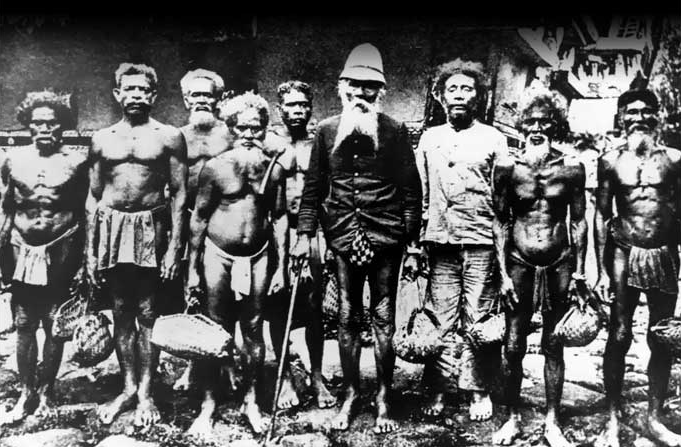
Louch, future Ibedul of Koror, standing in the centre with other Palauan chiefs.

Palau has several traditional chiefs of its 16 states. A factor that resulted in the decline of chiefly authority in Palau was the introduction of elected governors, called upon in the Constitution of Palau which came into effect on 1 January 1981.

== List of current chiefs ==
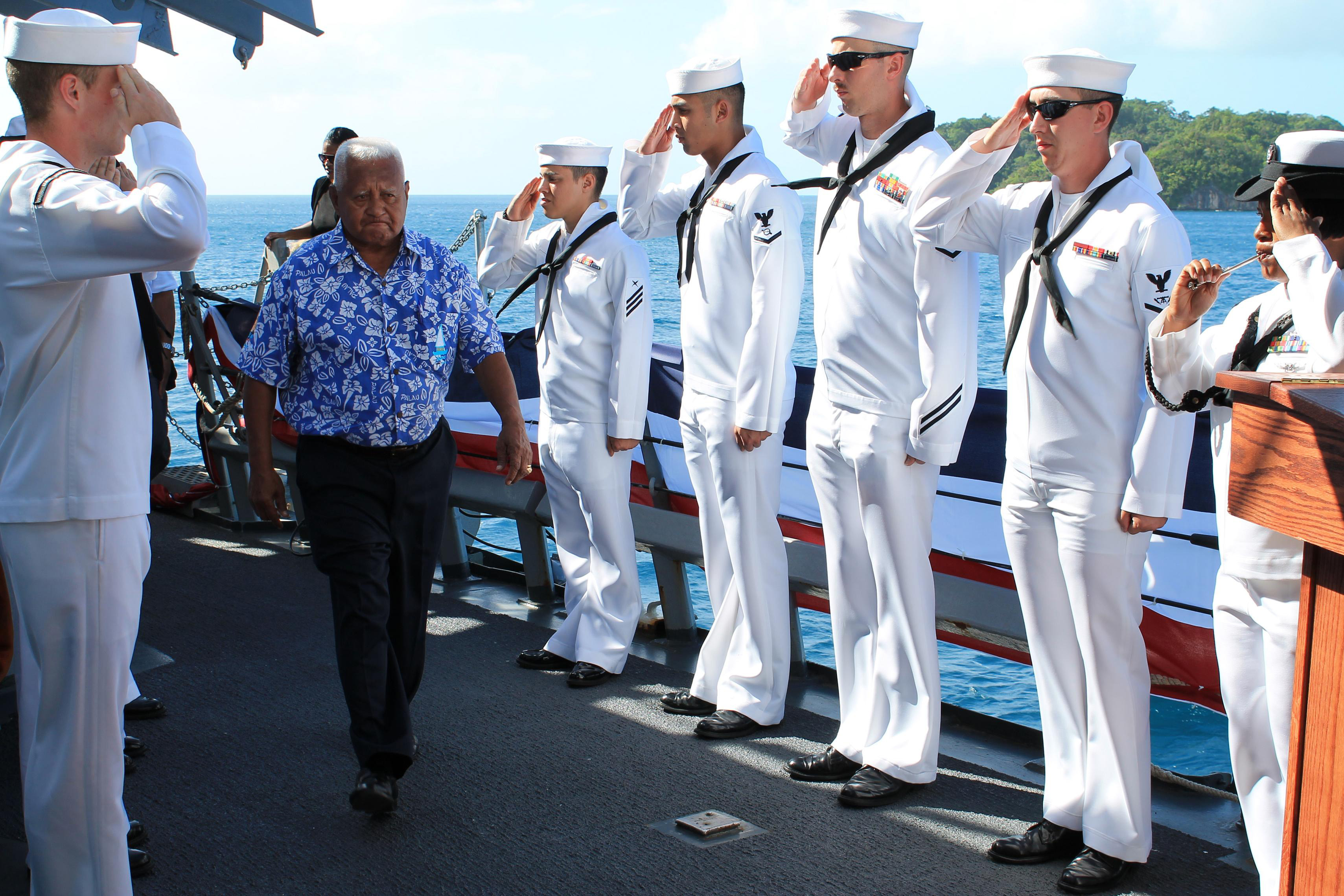
Sailors salute reklai of Melekeok Raphael B. Ngirmang in 2013

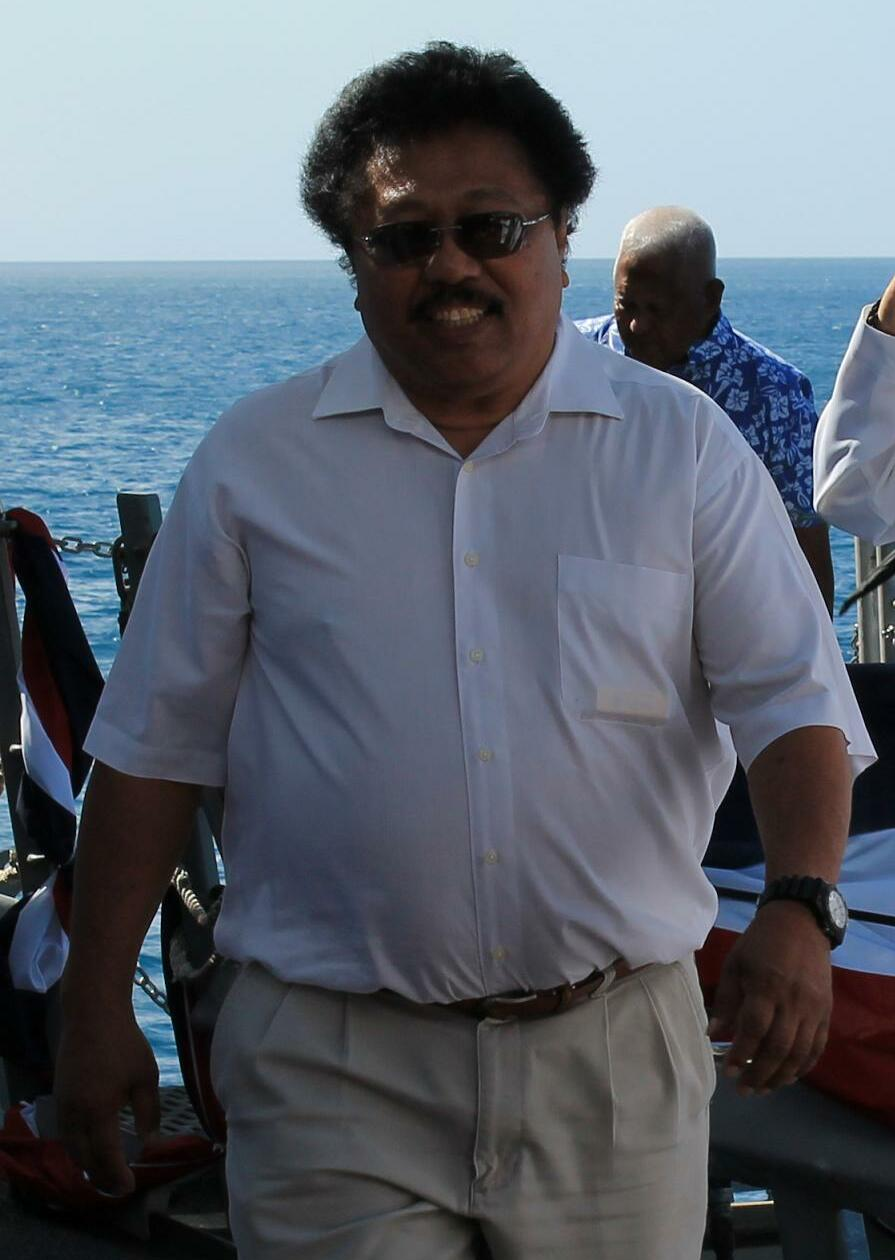
Former Ibedul of Koror Yutaka Gibbons in 2013. His sister is bilung Gloria Salii and his brother is the current ibedul of Koror Alexander Merep.

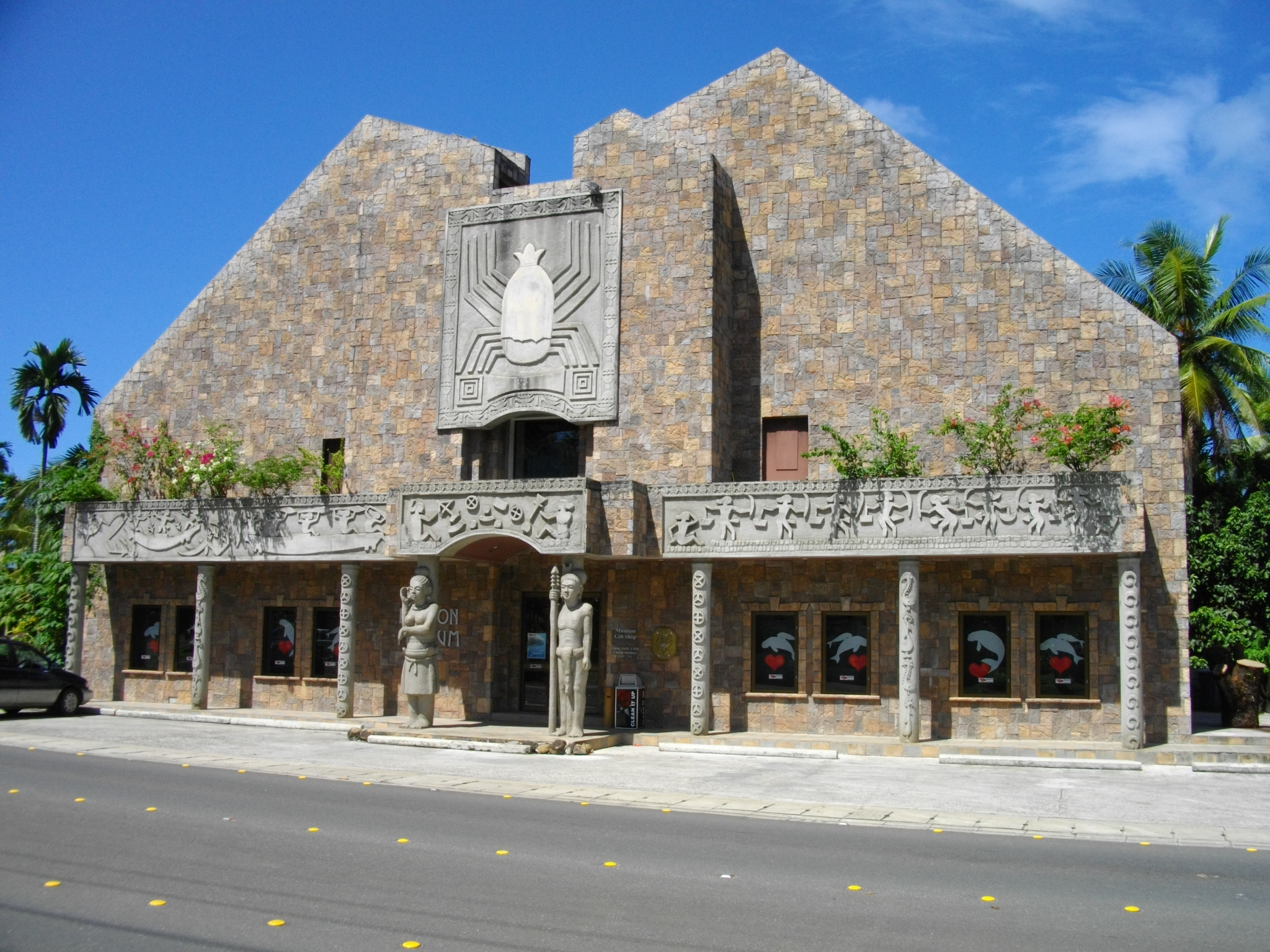
The Etpison Museum named for former President and rekemesik of Ngatpang Ngiratkel Etpison. His brother Yukiwo is the rengulbai of Aimeliik and his son Shallum is the uchelsias of Ngesias in Peleliu.

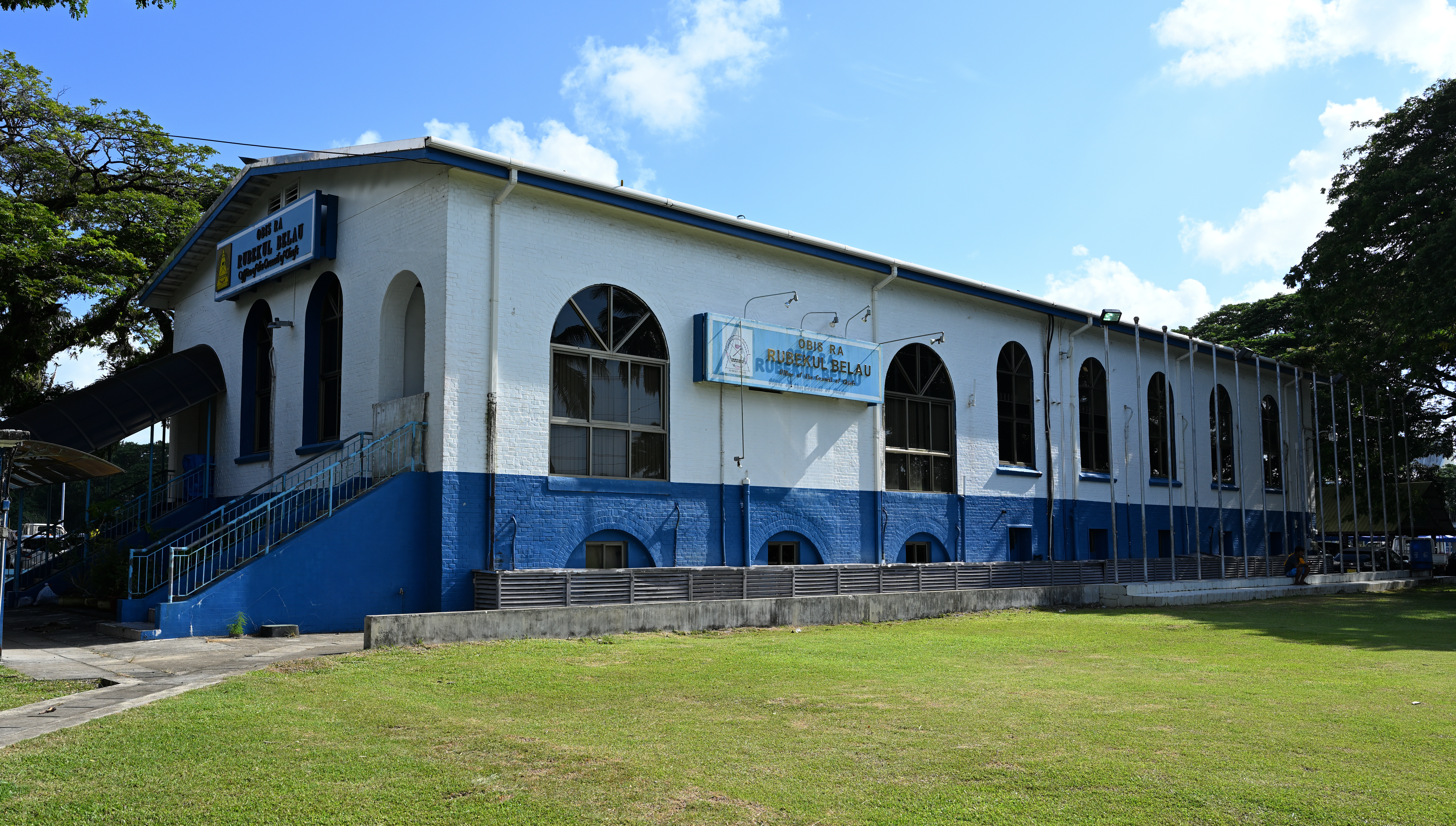
Office of the Council of Chiefs in Koror

Title	State	Incumbent	Predecessor	Notes
Council of Chiefs
Beouch	Ngardmau	Demei Obakrairur	Sakaziro Demk	
Heimong	Hatohobei	Vacant		
Ibedul	Koror	Alexander Merep	Yutaka Gibbons	See ibedul succession dispute.
Maderngebuked	Ngaraard	Thomas Remengesau Jr.	Thomas Remengesau Sr.	
Ngirakebou	Ngchesar	Andres Madraisau	Roman Bedor	
Ngiraked	Airai	Yukiwo P. Dengokl	Johnson Toribiong	
Ngirturong	Ngeremlengui	John Sugiyama	Yamakazaki Rengiil	
Nurap	Sonsorol	Nicholas Aquino		
Obak	Peleliu	Vacant	Isao Singeo	
Rdechor	Kayangel	Isimang Bandarii		
Rekemesik	Ngatpang	Surangel S. Whipps	Ngiratkel Etpison	Title disputed by Uchelsias Shallum Etpison, son of Ngiratkel Etpison.
Reklai	Melekeok	Raphael B. Ngirmang		
Rengulbai	Aimeliik	Yukiwo Etpison		
Ucherbelau	Angaur	Lorenso Edward		
Uongerchetei	Ngerchelong	Mathias Erbai	Victor Joseph	
Uongruious	Ngiwal	Vacant	Paulus Wong	
Other chiefs
Bilung	Koror	Gloria Salii	Ngerdoko	Female counterpart of ibedul and highest ranking female chief.
Ngiraikelau	Koror	Franco Gibbons		2nd highest ranking chief in Koror.
Uchelsias	Peleliu	Shallum Etpison	Yukiwo Shmull	Specifically chief of Ngesias which is the central portion of Peleliu.

== Ibedul ==
Ibedul is a title given to the high chief of Koror, in Palau, who is also the head of the Idid clan. Koror is the most populated state with approximately 64% of Palauans living there as of 2020. Historically, bearers of the title were sometimes erroneously referred to as "Kings of Pelew" despite them not having authority over all of modern-day Palau.

=== List of known ibeduls ===
Name	Portrait	Birth	Marriage(s)	Death
Abba Thulle fl. 1783				
Ilengelekei; 1871 – 1911 (39–40)				1911
Louch; 1911 – 1917 (5–6)				1917
Tem; 1917 – 1943 (25–26)				1943
Mariur; 1943 – 1958 (14–15)				1958
Ngoriakl; 1958 – 1972 (13–14)				1972
Yutaka Gibbons; 1973 – 4 November 2021 (47–48)		17 January 1944		4 November 2021; Aged 77
Alexander Merep; February 22, 2022 – present (4 years, 174 days)				Living
