= Eyos Rudimch =

Palauan politician

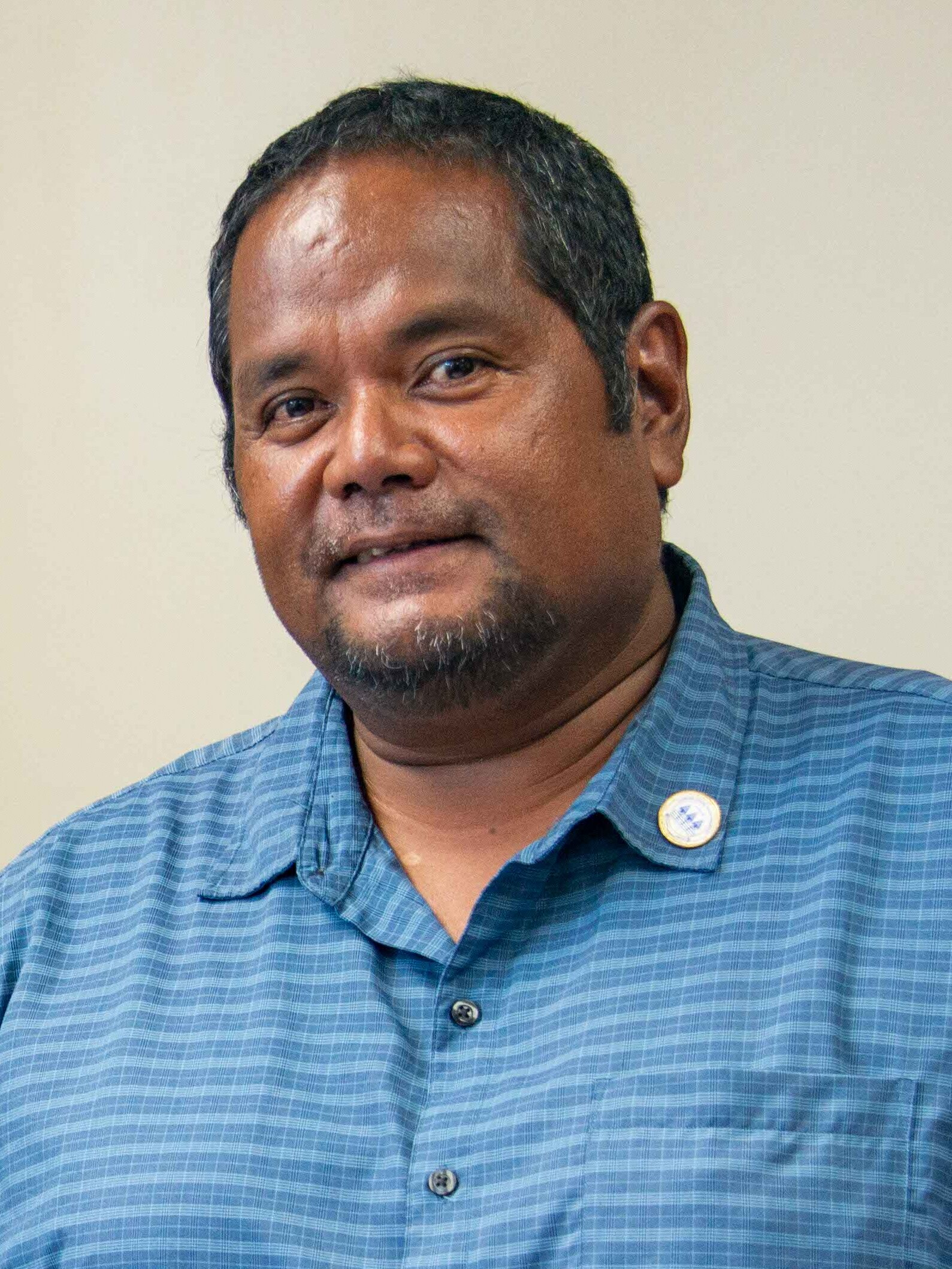

Governor of Koror
- Incumbent
- Assumed office 11 January 2022
- Preceded by: Franco Gibbons

Personal details
- Political party: Independent
- Spouse: Honora E. R. Rudimch
- Children: 2
- Parent: Isidoro Rudimch (father)
- Occupation: Politician

Eyos Rudimch is a Palauan politician. He was sworn in as Governor of Koror on 11 January 2022 after winning the November 2021 election. He previously held the position of Speaker of Koror. He has a bachelor's degree in business management from the University of Guam.

== Personal life ==
He is the son of Palauan politician Isidoro Rudimch. He is married to Honora E. R. Rudimch and has two children.

Political offices
Preceded by Franco Gibbons	Governor of Koror; 2022-present	Incumbent
