= Franco Gibbons =

Palauan politician

Governor of Koror
- In office 9 January 2018 – 11 January 2022
- Preceded by: Yositaka Adachi
- Succeeded by: Eyos Rudimch

Personal details
- Born: Francisco Bares Gibbons
- Party: Independent
- Spouse: Yuki Ngotel
- Children: 2
- Occupation: Politician

Francisco Bares Gibbons is a Palauan politician. In January 2018, he became the youngest Governor of Koror. He previously held the position of Vice Speaker of Koror.

== Career ==
He has a bachelor's degree in business administration from the University of Hawaiʻi at Hilo.

In June 2020, Gibbons donated 100 sacks of rice to the Division of Correction and 200 sacks of rice to the Ministry of Health. On 10 June 2021, he announced he would be seeking re-election in the November 2021 election. The other candidates included former Governor Yositaka Adachi, Speaker Alan Marbou and former Speaker Eyos Rudimch. Rudimch won the election with Gibbons coming fourth.

== Controversy ==
In November 2022, he was found guilty of several criminal charges including misconduct in public office, ethics violations, and tampering with a government record.

== Personal life ==
He is married to Yuki Ngotel and has two children. He holds the title of Ngiraikelau, making him the second highest ranking chief of Koror.

Political offices
| Preceded by Yositaka Adachi | Governor of Koror; 2018-2022 | Succeeded by Eyos Rudimch |
