= Koror =

Koror State Oreor Oreor; Ernguul
- State
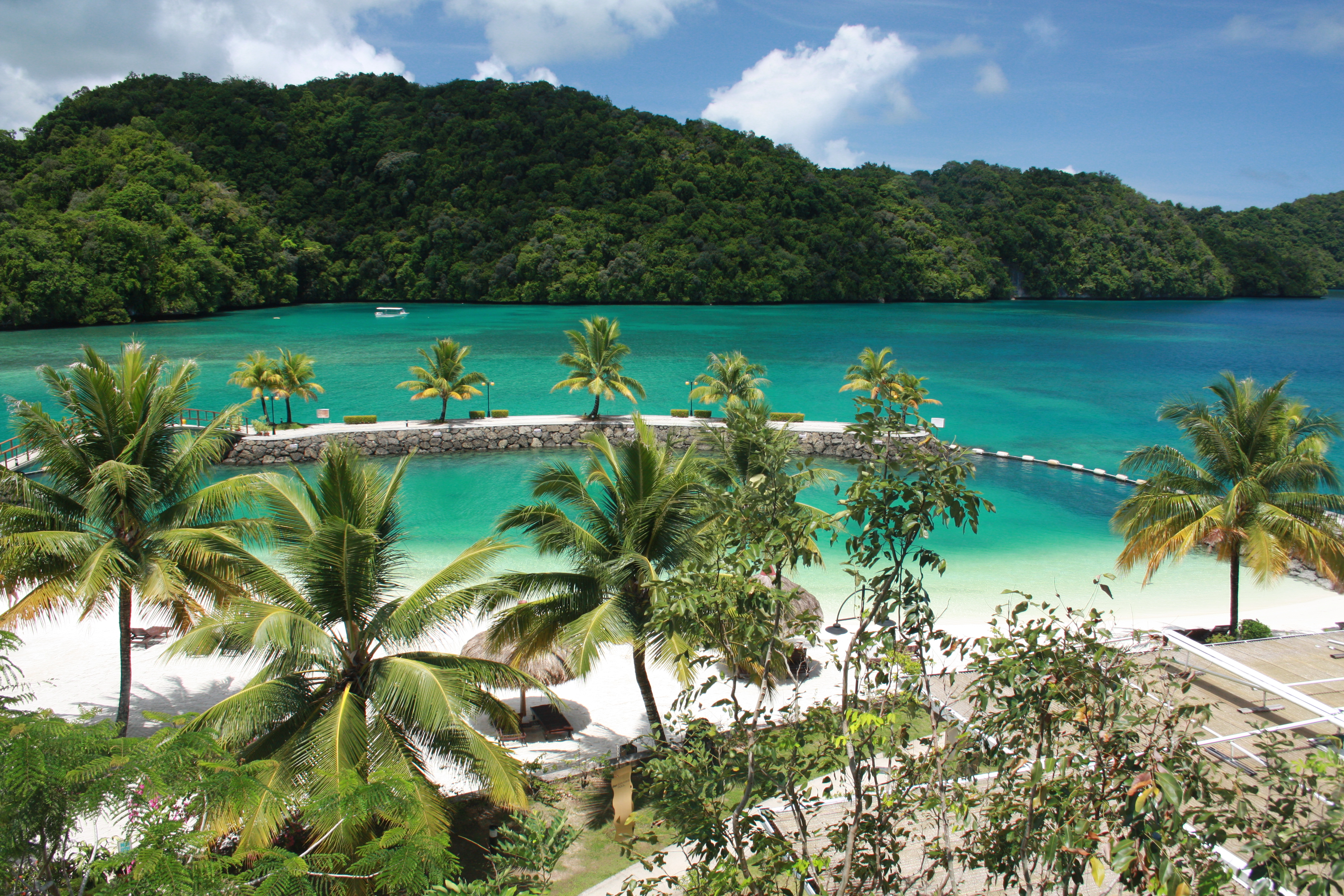

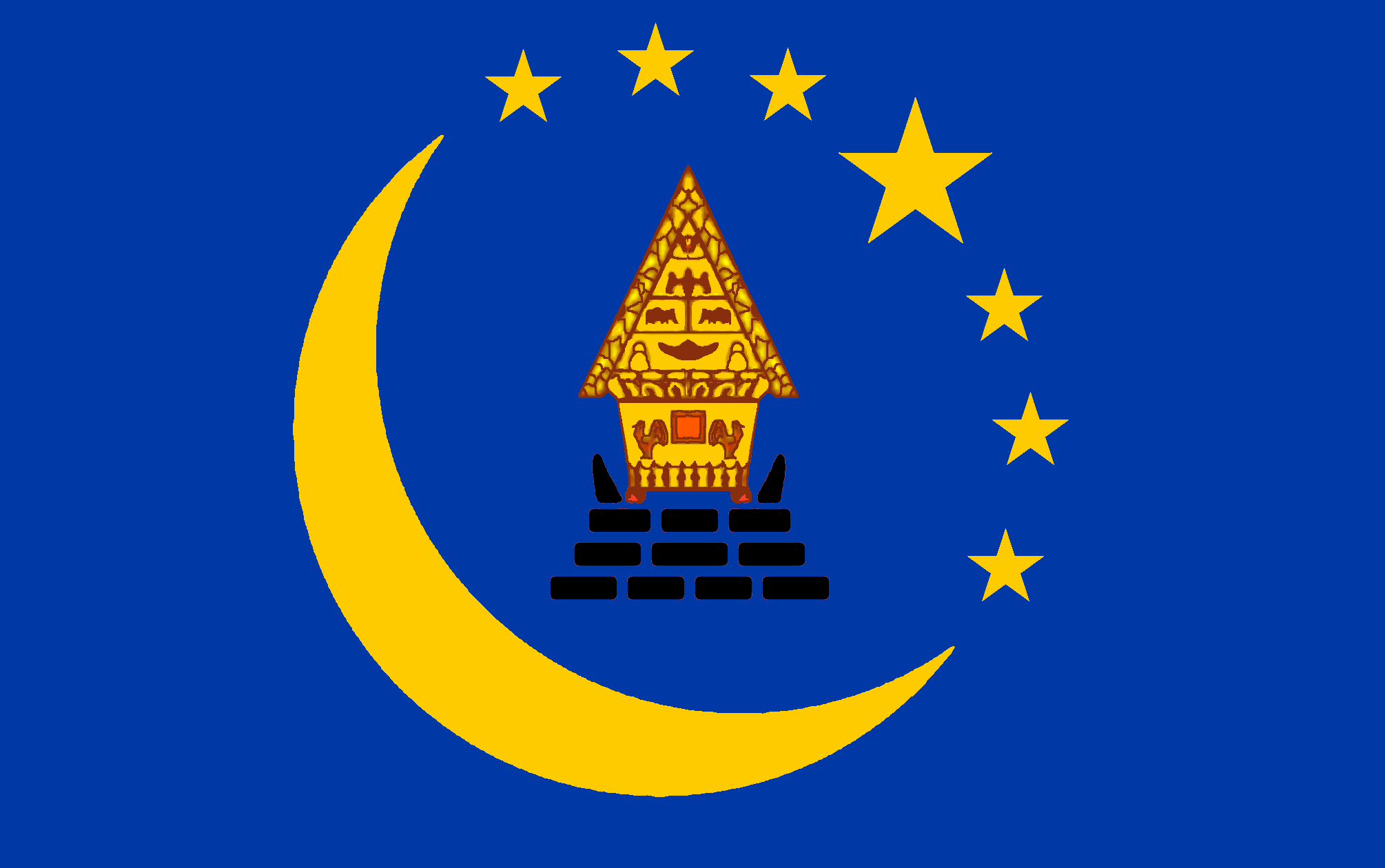
- Flag

- Location of Koror State in Palau. Koror Island is at the northeast.
- Coordinates: 07°20′32″N 134°28′38″E
- Country: Palau
- Capital: Koror

Government
  - Body: Koror State Legislature
  - Governor: Eyos Rudimch (Ind.)
  - Speaker: Alan Marbou
  - Vice-Speaker: Ann L. Pedro
  - Floor Leader: Jason Nolan

Population (2020 Census)
  - Total: 11,199
  - Density: 176/km^{2} (460/sq mi)
  - Official languages: Palauan; English
- Postal code: 96940
- Area code: 488
- ISO 3166 code: PW-150
- Website: kororstategov.com

Koror is the state comprising the main commercial centre of the Republic of Palau. It consists of several islands, the most prominent being Koror Island (also Oreor Island). It is Palau's most populous state; more people live in Koror than in the rest of Palau.

== History ==
In the oral tradition of Palau, Koror is one of the children of Milad, and thus occupies an important position in traditional belief. In addition, Koror is the home of the clan of the Ibedul, the high chief of Palau.

Several traditional villages in Koror span the volcanic and rock island portions. Many of the stone platforms (odesongel) served as clan cemeteries, and other stone features serve as shrines. The lagoon was an important resource area, and was probably intensively exploited prehistorically.

Koror was formerly the capital of the South Seas Mandate, a League of Nations mandated territory administered by the Empire of Japan.

== Geography ==
Map of the state of Koror

The state of Koror contains a majority of Palau's population and is the location of the country's largest town and former capital, also called Koror or Koror City. The second largest settlement is Meyuns.

Koror State stretches across a large portion of the lagoon extending from Babeldaob Island on the north almost to Beliliou Island to the south. Though widely spread, the actual land mass of Koror is not great and consists of hundreds of islands and islets including most of the Rock Islands of Palau. Koror encompasses perhaps the most varied range of geography in Micronesia with many different kinds of physical and social settings. In the northern part of the state are three volcanic islands: Koror, Ngerekebesang, and Ngemelachel.

Across Koror Island, the intensive land use in the last two centuries has radically altered the land's shape. Most vegetation has been cleared for house construction or put into gardens. Steep slopes have dense secondary growth brush. On Ngerekebesang Island, the land use has not been quite as intense and areas on the northwest coast contain stands of volcanic island forest. To the south, the Rock Islands offer a landscape that appears out of this world. The Rock Islands consist of uplifted coralline limestone reef with shear cliffs rising above a characteristic sea-level notch. Small beaches have formed in a few coves and provide access to the interiors. The ground is not covered by soil, but instead consists of dog-toothed sharp chunks of reef which have broken off of the crags and spires jutting skyward in an unpredictable maze. The islands are covered by a rock island forest and vines clinging to crevices in the limestone. In places, sinkholes contain marine lakes, and in other places the sinkholes contain wind-blown soil.

Presently, most land in Koror is involved in urban development with gardens interspersed with houses and business. The Rock Islands offer valuable areas for exploiting the rich lagoon, and for the development of the tourist industry.

Koror consists of 11 hamlets:

- Dngeronger
- Idid
- Ikelau
- Iyebukel
- Medalaii
- Meketii
- Ngarkesoal
- Ngerbeched
- Ngerchemai
- Ngerkebesang
- Ngermid

== Demography ==
In 2020, 64% of Palau's population lived in Koror State. Koror's median age was 35.8 years. The official languages of the state are Palauan and English.

In June 1972, the resident population was 6,032.

== Education ==
Schools in Koror operated by the Ministry of Education include:

- Palau High School
- Koror Elementary School—it opened in 1945 after World War II. The current building opened in 1969 as Typhoon Sally destroyed the previous one.
- George B. Harris Elementary School in eastern Koror—named after a member of the Land Registration Team of Palau, it was built in 1964 to relieve Koror Elementary.
- Meyuns Elementary School in Meyuns—it was built circa 1969 and expanded in 1973. It was established since Typhoon Sally destroyed Koror Elementary, where Meyuns students previously attended. The Trust Territory of the Pacific Islands administration was previously uninterested in building a school in Melyuns.

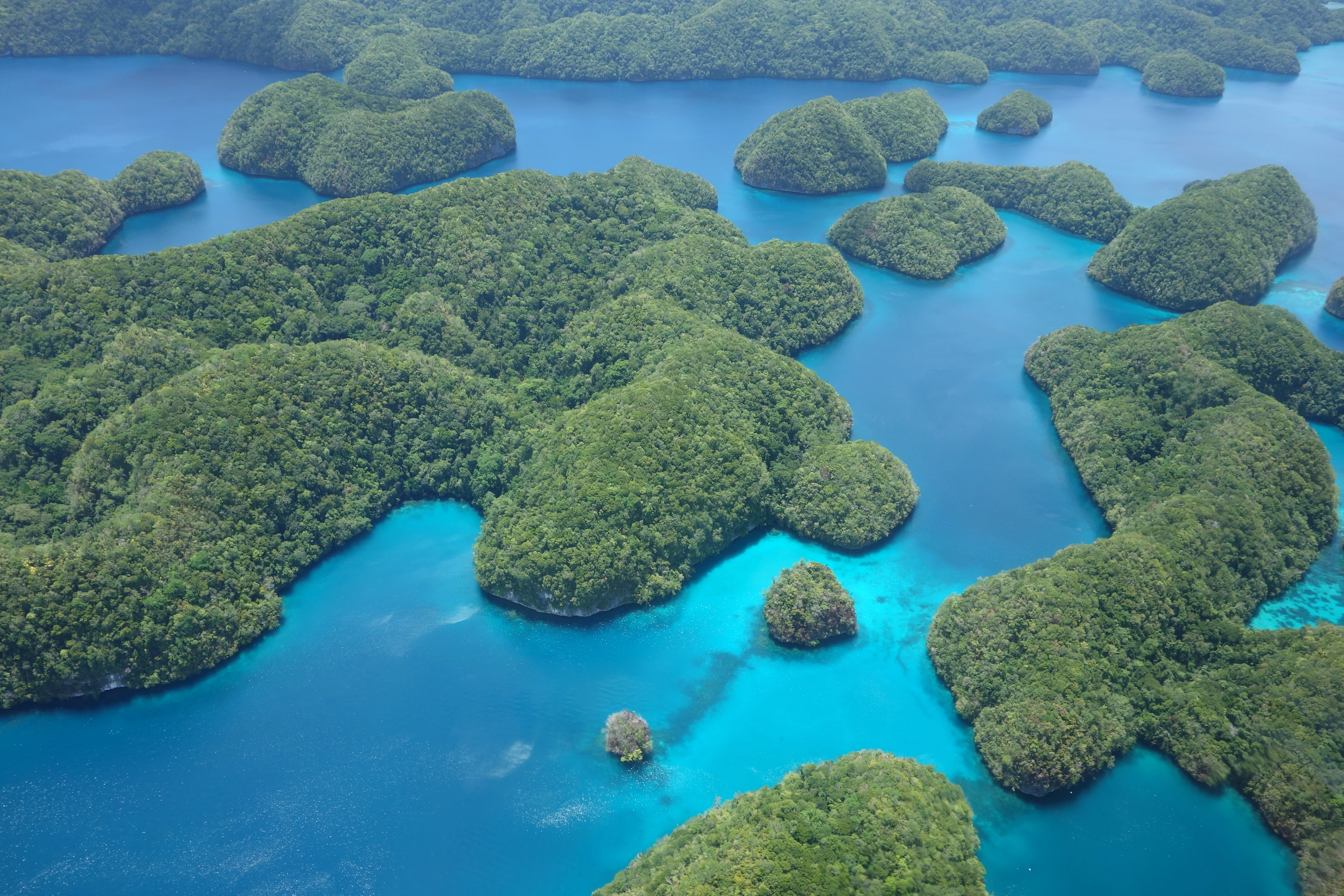
Rock Islands, Koror State

== Economy ==
Belau Air has its headquarters in Koror, as did the short-lived Pacific Flier in 2010.

=== Tourism ===
Much of Palau's economy comes from tourism. The Rock Islands of Palau are all located in the state. Scuba diving shops and facilities are located all over Koror. Accommodation like hotels, bars, restaurants, cafes, and resorts are all available. Dolphins Pacific, the world's largest dolphin research facility, is open for tourists who are interested in swimming and interacting with trained dolphins. Most tourists to Palau stay in Koror, which is the centre for Palau's resort services and house modern conveniences. Koror has businesses that cater to speakers of many languages.

By 2001, the Koror Jail, Palau's only correctional facility, has become a tourist destination thanks to inmates who create and sell elaborate wooden storyboards at a retail facility located on the jail's grounds.

The jail consists of three structures, and it is surrounded by an eight-foot wire mesh fence and an eight-foot concrete wall.

== Political system ==
Koror has its own constitution, adopted in 1983. The state government was established in 1983. The state of Koror has an elected chief executive, governor. The state also has a legislature elected every four years. The state population elects one of the members of the House of Delegates of Palau.

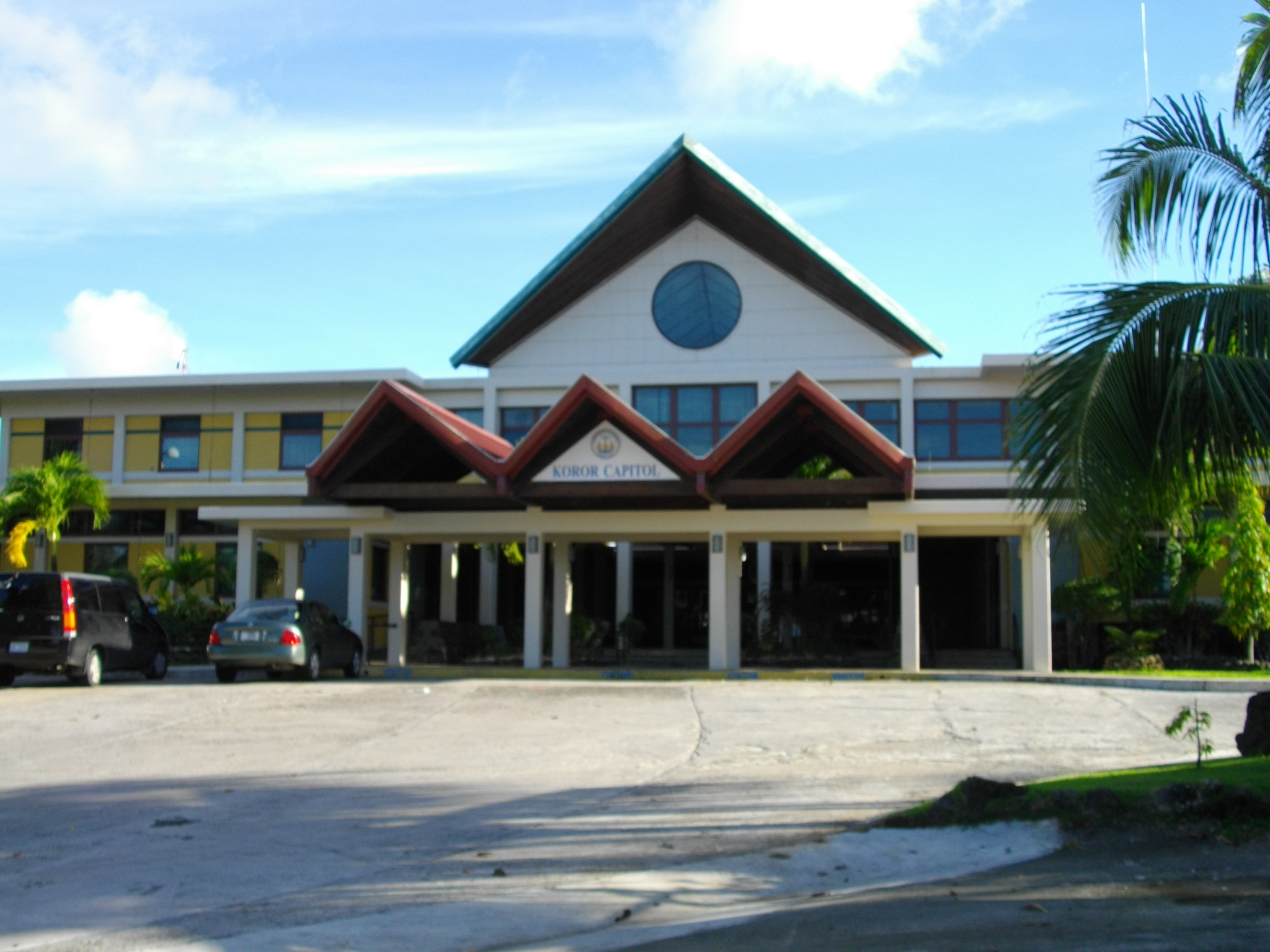
Koror State Government Building

== Transport ==
The island of Koror is connected by bridges to three neighbouring islands:

- Ngerekebesang Island, the site of Palau's second-largest town, Meyuns, in the eastern part of the island, with a population of 1,200.
- Malakal Island, the site of Koror's port.
- Koror Island is also connected by the Koror–Babeldaob Bridge to the state of Airai in the island of Babeldaob, where Palau International Airport is located.

A main road extends through Koror along the central ridge, from the Koror-Babeldaob Bridge on the east to its western end in Medalaii. A network of secondary roads extends throughout the residential areas, and causeways connect Koror to Ngerekebesang and Ngemelachel Islands. Docking facilities are found on the northern coast in Meketii and on the southern coast in Medalaii. The major harbor facility for Palau is located on the east side of Ngemelachel Island. Malakal Harbor offers a sheltered, deep-water anchorage and has been in continual use since the 1840s. Most goods found in the many stores throughout Palau come through this port.

== Climate ==
Koror features a tropical rainforest climate under the Köppen climate classification. The town experiences an extraordinary amount of rainfall annually, averaging around 3,750 mm (148 in) of precipitation annually over 263.4 precipitation days. As with many areas with this climate type, temperatures remain relatively constant throughout the course of the year, averaging roughly 27 °C (81 °F). On 22 March 2018, Koror recorded a temperature of 35.0 °C (95.0 °F), which is the highest temperature to have ever been recorded in Palau.

Climate data for Koror (1981−2010 normals, extremes 1951−present)
Month	Jan	Feb	Mar	Apr	May	Jun	Jul	Aug	Sep	Oct	Nov	Dec	Year
Record high °F (°C)	93 (34)	93 (34)	95 (35)	94 (34)	94 (34)	95 (35)	93 (34)	94 (34)	92 (33)	93 (34)	93 (34)	94 (34)	95 (35)
Mean daily maximum °F (°C)	86.5 (30.3)	86.4 (30.2)	87.1 (30.6)	87.8 (31.0)	87.7 (30.9)	86.8 (30.4)	86.1 (30.1)	86.0 (30.0)	86.5 (30.3)	87.0 (30.6)	87.8 (31.0)	87.2 (30.7)	86.9 (30.5)
Mean daily minimum °F (°C)	76.3 (24.6)	76.1 (24.5)	76.3 (24.6)	76.9 (24.9)	77.0 (25.0)	76.4 (24.7)	76.4 (24.7)	77.0 (25.0)	77.0 (25.0)	77.1 (25.1)	77.0 (25.0)	76.7 (24.8)	76.7 (24.8)
Record low °F (°C)	69 (21)	71 (22)	69 (21)	69 (21)	71 (22)	71 (22)	70 (21)	70 (21)	70 (21)	71 (22)	70 (21)	71 (22)	69 (21)
Average precipitation inches (mm)	11.09 (282)	9.54 (242)	8.27 (210)	8.19 (208)	12.52 (318)	18.01 (457)	18.12 (460)	13.92 (354)	12.09 (307)	12.06 (306)	11.90 (302)	11.93 (303)	147.64 (3,750)
Average precipitation days (≥ 0.25 mm)	23.2	19.6	20.0	18.7	23.3	25.1	24.1	20.4	19.9	21.6	22.9	24.6	263.4
Average relative humidity (%)	84.3	83.7	83.8	83.3	85.4	86.2	85.3	84.9	83.7	84.8	85.1	85.0	84.6
Mean monthly sunshine hours	199.8	194.5	244.0	234.2	212.3	168.9	186.9	176.8	197.2	179.5	183.3	183.1	2,360.5
Percentage possible sunshine	55	58	65	63	55	45	48	46	54	48	52	50	53
Source: NOAA (relative humidity and sun 1961−1990)

== Notable residents ==
- Abba Thulle
- Franco Gibbons
- Grace Y. Sam
- John C. Gibbons
- Prince Lee Boo (1764-1784)
- Ruby Joy Gabriel, Olympic Track and Field athlete
- Yositaka Adachi
- Yutaka Gibbons

== See also ==
- Sacred Heart Church, Koror
