= Caleb T. O. Otto =

Palauan physician (born 1943)

Caleb Tyndale Okauchi Otto (May 19, 1943, in Peleliu – October 28, 2018) was a Palauan physician who served as a member of the Senate of Palau.

== Political career ==
He received a Bachelor of Science degree at the University of Washington in 1970. He worked in health services in Fiji. Otto represented Palau in the World Health Organization (WHO) from 1995 to 2003. He unsuccessfully ran for Governor of Peleliu in the December 2009 election against incumbent governor Kangichi Uchau who was his cousin. From 3 September 2013, he served as the Permanent Representative of Palau to the United Nations.
