= Shmull =

Shmull is a Palauan surname. Notable people with the surname include:

- Moy Shmull, Palauan spearfisher
- Temmy Shmull (born 1947 or 1948), Palauan politician
- Yukio Shmull (died 2018), Palauan politician
