= Yukio Shmull =

Palauan politician

Governor of Peleliu
- In office 1 January 1983 – 1 January 1986
- Preceded by: Office established
- Succeeded by: Timarong Sisior

Personal details
- Born: Yukio Mengirarou Shmull; 1939 or 1940
- Died: 9 June 2018 (aged 78)
- Party: Independent
- Occupation: Politician

Yukio Mengirarou Shmull (Note: Also spelled Yukiwo.) (died 9 June 2018) was a Palauan politician who served as the first Governor of Peleliu from 1983 to 1986.

== Career ==
Shmull served as supervisor of the Palauan government's property and supply division from 1963 to 1967, a member and chairman of the Palau Maritime Authority from 1982 to 1992, a member and vice chairman of the country's foreign investment board from 1978 to 1980 and a member of the Palau National Communications Corporation's board of directors from 1982 to 1985. He served as the first Governor of Peleliu from 1983 to 1986 and was speaker of the Peleliu State Legislature from 1996 to 1998. In 2009, he became a member of the Belau National Museum's board of directors of the and he was also a member of the Pacific Asia Travel Association. In 2011, he received the title of uchelsias of Ngesias in Peleliu. In 2016, he became a member of the 12th Peleliu State Legislature.

== Death ==
He died on 9 June 2018 at the age of 78. On 19 June 2018, President Thomas Remengesau Jr. proclaimed that all flags be flown at half-mast from 20 June to 25 June in honour of Shmull. In December 2018, he was succeeded as Uchelsias by Shallum Etpison, son of former president Ngiratkel Etpison.

== Notes ==
Political offices
New title	Governor of Peleliu; 1983-1986	Succeeded by Timarong Sisior
