= Uchau =

Uchau could refer to:

- Kangichi Uchau, Palauan politician
- Uchaud, a commune in Gard département, France
- Uchaux, a commune in Vaclause département, France
