= Governor Roberts =

Governor Roberts may refer to:

- Albert H. Roberts (1868–1946), 33rd Governor of Tennessee
- Barbara Roberts (born 1936), 34th Governor of Oregon
- Colin Roberts (diplomat) (born 1959), Governor of the Falkland Islands from 2014 to 2017
- Dennis J. Roberts (1903–1994), 63rd Governor of Rhode Island
- Emais Roberts, Governor of Peleliu
- Henry Roberts (governor) (1853–1929), 61st Governor of Connecticut
- Oran Milo Roberts (1815–1898), 17th Governor of Texas
