= Imelchol Village =

- Village
- Map showing location of Imechal
- Coordinates: 7°02′24″N 134°15′54″E
- Country: Palau
- State: Peleliu

Imelchol Village, also spelled Imechal, is a village in Peleliu, Palau. It is located near Kloulklubed and Koska.

== See also ==
- List of cities, towns and villages in Palau

== Sources ==
- Hollywood, Mike (2006). Papa Mike's Palau Islands Handbook. iUniverse. ISBN 9780595376070.
