= Koska =

Koska may refer to:

- Koška, a village and municipality in Croatia
- Koska, Palau, a village in Palau
- Marc Koska (born 1961), British inventor
