= Olympia E. Morei-Remengesau =

Palauan museum director

Olympia E. Morei-Remengesau is a curator from Palau, who was appointed Director of Belau National Museum in 2009. Born in Koror State, she began work at the museum as an administrator, before moving to the role of Assistant to the Director. She is co-vice chair of the Kraemer Ethnography Translation Project, which translated the works of Augustin Krämer from German to Palauan, and was funded by the German government. She is also the National Representative for the Federation of International Dance Festivals (FIDAF). In 2019 she secured a $10,000 donation from Taiwan to fund a new exhibition to celebrate the 25th anniversary of Palau's independence. During the COVID-19 pandemic, she led the museum, enabling it to continue its community work despite being forced to lay off several members of staff.
