= Temmy Shmull =

Palauan politician (1947–2025)

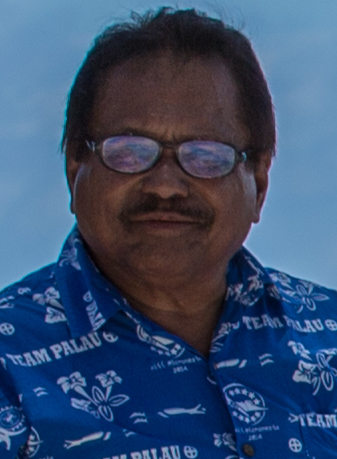
- Shmull in 2019

Governor of Peleliu
- In office 1 January 2013 – 1 January 2022
- Preceded by: Kangichi Uchau
- Succeeded by: Emais Roberts

Minister of State
- In office January 2001 – 2009
- President: Thomas Remengesau Jr.
- Preceded by: Sabino Anastacio
- Succeeded by: Sandra Pierantozzi

Personal details
- Born: Temmy L. Shmull; 3 August 1947 Peleliu
- Died: 28 February 2025 (aged 77)
- Party: Independent
- Occupation: Politician

Temmy L. Shmull (3 August 1947 – 28 February 2025) was a Palauan politician who served as Governor of Peleliu for three terms from January 2013 to January 2022. He previously served as the Minister of State of Palau from 2001 to 2009 and was also the vice president of the Palau National Olympic Committee.

== Early life ==
Shmull was born in Peleliu on 3 August 1947. He was a teacher at Peleliu Elementary School.

== Political career ==
He worked in the government as a foreign service officer and later became an advisor to Acting President Thomas Remengesau. He was the Chief of Staff of President Kuniwo Nakamura before being appointed the Minister of State of Palau in 2001 under Thomas Remengesau Jr. Shmull accompanied President Remengesau on his visit to Japan from 1 August 2001 to 8 August 2001. On 3 March 2006, he submitted the country's application for membership to the International Atomic Energy Agency which was approved on 8 March 2006. On 9 March 2006, the Governor of Peleliu Jackson Ngiraingas asked the Senate of Palau to conduct an investigation into numerous allegations of conflicts of interest against Shmull and other politicians. Shmull's alleged conflict of interest being his $85,000 purchase of a speedboat at Surangel & Sons in 2005.

He became the Governor of Peleliu in January 2013. In January 2014, he was charged with soliciting prostitutes at a karaoke bar which is illegal in Palau. In March 2014, former Palauan politician Joshua Koshiba called for the removal of Shmull as vice president of the Palau National Olympic Committee though he would be reconfirmed in his position in February 2017. He successfully ran for a second term as governor in the December 2015 election defeating former governor Jackson Ngiraingas. He won his third term as governor in the December 2018 election in which he received 309 votes and Ngiraingas received 265 votes. In April 2019, to commemorate International Mine Awareness Day, Shmull announced that he believed the presence of anti-personnel landmines had been eradicated from the state. In April 2020, he was sued by Ngiraingas for violating the Open Government Act by not responding to his letters requesting information in 2015 and had to pay a fine of $500 and make the requested documents available. He stepped down due to the term limits of the constitution of Peleliu and was succeeded by Emais Roberts, who he endorsed, in January 2022.

== Personal life and death ==
The funeral of his mother Dirramolei Mellomes E. Shmull took place in August 2018. Shmull's son Temmy Shmull Jr. was treasurer of Belau Offshore Fisheries Inc., the country's official administrator of tuna and other fish species.

Shmull died on 28 February 2025.

Political offices
| Preceded by Sabino Anastacio | Minister of State of Palau; 2001-2009 | Succeeded by Sandra Pierantozzi |
| Preceded by Kangichi Uchau | Governor of Peleliu; 2013-2022 | Succeeded by Emais Roberts |
