= Etpison Museum =

Museum in Koror, Palau

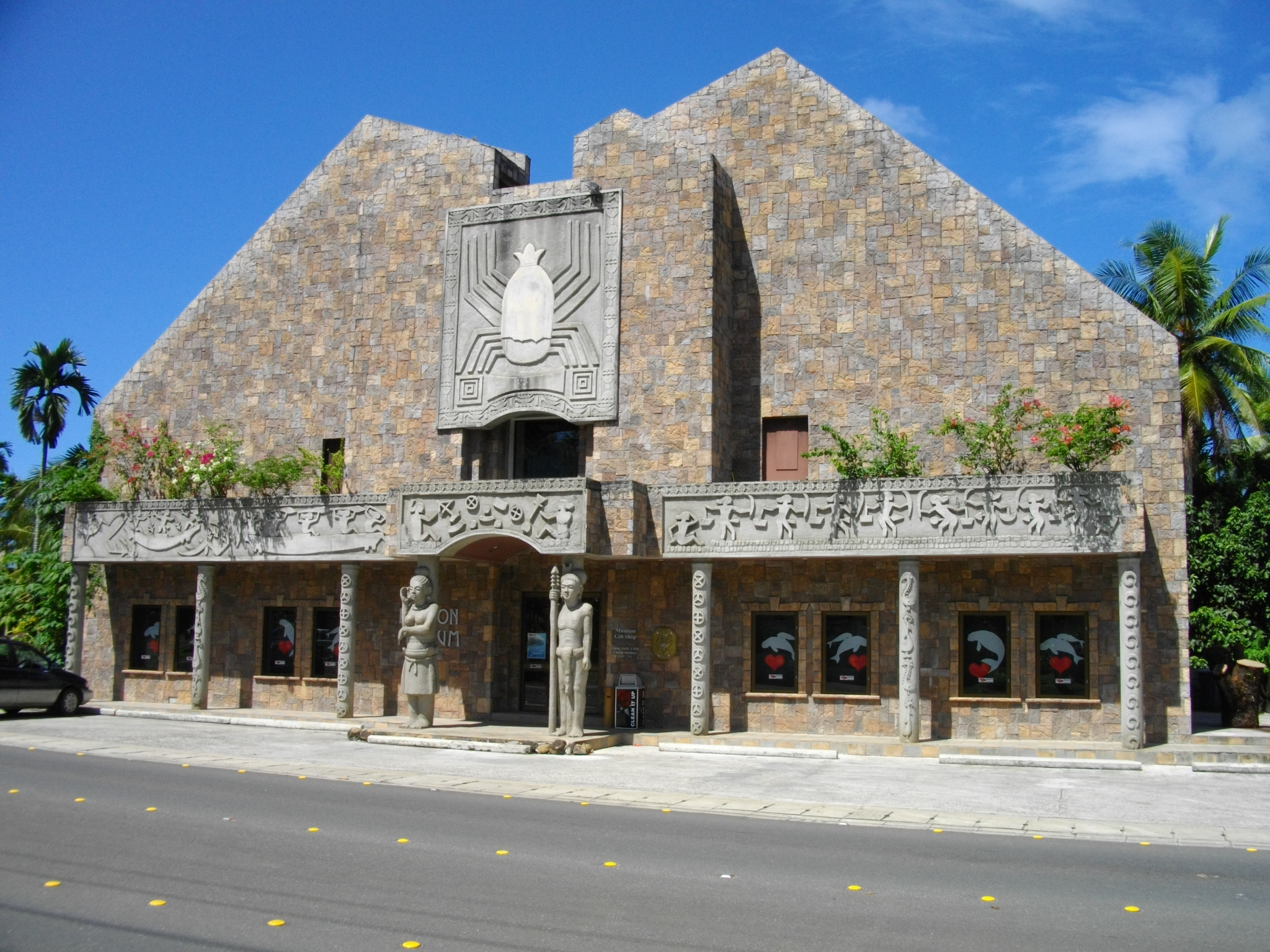
- Front entrance
- Established: August 1999
- Location: Koror City, Palau
- Coordinates: 7°20′43.2″N 134°28′59.4″E
- Type: museum
- Director: Mandy Thijssen Etpison
- Architects: Shallum and Mandy Etpison
- Website: Official website

The Etpison Museum is a museum in Koror City, in Koror, Palau. The museum opened in August 1999, in a building designed and built by Shallum and Mandy Etpison. It documents the history and culture of the country of Palau.

== History ==
The land for the museum building was donated by former President Ngiratkel Etpison. The museum was opened in August 1999 and was built by his children Shallum and Mandy Etpison. Mandy Etpison is the director and curator of the museum. In 2014, it underwent renovation and more displays were added.

== Architecture ==
The 3-story building museum was designed by Shallum and Mandy Etpison. The total floor of the museum spans over an area of 279 square metres (3,000 sq ft). The museum features a gift shop.

== Exhibitions ==
The museum exhibits various artifacts on the history of the nation, money, archaeological sites, clothes etc. They discuss foreign influence on the nation, and show traditional aspects of Palau's culture, such as child birth ceremonies, and traditional canoes. The museum is well known for its large collection of model bai (traditional meeting houses), which provide insight into the socio-political structures society in Palau. The museum also teamed up with the Dutch embassy in Manila to spread awareness in schools of endemic birds in the country, and the museum features a mural of native birds, and encourages visitors to download an app, iBird, to learn about them. The museum also hosts workshops to highlight Palauan culture, such as art demonstrations. There is a gift shop selling traditional Palauan crafts.

== Consulate ==
The Etpison museum also plays host to the Dutch consulate in Palau. The museum's director Mandy Etpison, who was born in the Netherlands, is the Honorary Consul.

== See also ==
- List of museums in Palau
