= Koska, Palau =

Koska
- Village
- Map showing location of Koska
- Coordinates: 7°02′06.9″N 134°15′07.2″E
- Country: Palau
- State: Peleliu

Koska is a village in Peleliu, Palau. It is located near Imelchol Village and Kloulklubed.

== See also ==
- List of cities, towns and villages in Palau

== Sources ==
- Hollywood, Mike (2006). Papa Mike's Palau Islands Handbook. iUniverse. ISBN 9780595376070.
