= List of museums in Palau =

This is a list of museums in Palau.

- Belau National Museum
- Etpison Museum

== See also ==
- List of museums
