= COVID-19 pandemic in Palau =

- Disease: COVID-19
- Pathogen: SARS-CoV-2
- Location: Palau
- First outbreak: Wuhan, China
- Arrival date: 31 May 2021
- Confirmed cases: 6,372
- Deaths: 10
- Fatality rate: 0.16%
- Vaccinations: 18,281 (fully vaccinated)

Government website
- http://www.palauhealth.org

The COVID-19 pandemic in Palau was part of the worldwide pandemic of coronavirus disease 2019 (COVID-19) caused by severe acute respiratory syndrome coronavirus 2 (SARS-CoV-2). The virus was confirmed to have reached Palau on 31 May 2021. By August 2021, Palau had one of the highest COVID-19 vaccination rates in the world with approximately 84% of its population fully vaccinated. The majority of cases in Palau were recorded in 2022.

== Background ==
On 12 January 2020, the World Health Organization (WHO) confirmed that a novel coronavirus was the cause of a respiratory illness in a cluster of people in Wuhan, Hubei Province, China, which was reported to the WHO on 31 December 2019.

The case fatality ratio for COVID-19 has been much lower than SARS of 2003, but the transmission has been significantly greater, with a significant total death toll.

== Timeline ==
Cases

Deaths

=== 2020 ===
Palau began implementing border controls early on. The President of Palau Thomas Remengesau Jr. issued an executive order suspending all charter flights from China, Macau, and Hong Kong from 1–29 February 2020. By March, the country's borders were closed. Schools were also shut starting in April. Remengesau eventually suspended travel to Palau.

The order also quarantined all non-citizens who recently entered the country for fourteen days.

=== 2021 ===
On 1 April 2021 Palau and Taiwan established a "travel bubble", allowing people to travel between the two countries, with restrictions. The following month Palauan Minister of Health Emais Roberts said that the Taiwan bubble had become a "mute[sic] issue now" due to travel restrictions introduced between the countries as a result of Taiwan's rising COVID-19 cases.

Palau registered its first case of COVID-19 on 31 May 2021. President Surangel Whipps Jr. said that the patient was at low risk of infecting others and that the close contacts of the patient had returned negative test results. President Surangel Whipps Jr. also highlighted that the majority of the population had been vaccinated against SARS-CoV-2. On 11 June 2021, a second case was reported. No new cases were recorded by 24 August.

== Statistics ==
=== New cases per day ===
View source data.

=== Cases by states ===
Positive cases by state (as of 25 March 2022)
State	Cases	References
Aimeliik	55	
Airai	506	
Angaur	21	
Hatohobei	0	
Kayangel	2	
Koror	2,841	
Melekeok	36	
Ngaraard	97	
Ngarchelong	42	
Ngardmau	25	
Ngatpang	41	
Ngchesar	38	
Ngeremlengui	92	
Ngiwal	62	
Peleliu	97	
Sonsorol	0	
Unknown	32	
14/16	3,987	

== Vaccination ==
Palauans began receiving COVID-19 vaccines in 2021. As a member of the Compact of Free Association with the United States, Palau has received vaccines from Operation Warp Speed. According to the Ministry of Health, vaccination started on 3 January and as of 12 April 40% of the population was fully vaccinated. By 26 May, an estimated 96% of adults (18 and over) in the country had been fully vaccinated. By the time the first case was detected, 97% of the adult population was vaccinated, about 70% of all Palauans. Plans were also announced to start vaccinating adolescents from 12 to 17.

By early August 2021, 65% of 12 to 17 year olds had at least one dose of the vaccine, resulting in 80% of the eligible population being fully vaccinated. As of 24 August 2021, 14,938 adults have received at least 1-dose with 14,447 of those being fully vaccinated. A further 1,146 adolescents (aged 12 to 17 years old) have received at least 1-dose with 835 of those being fully vaccinated. Palau's population is approximately 18,092, meaning approximately 84.5% of the total population is fully vaccinated.

== See also ==
- COVID-19 pandemic in Oceania
