= Jackson Ngiraingas =

Palauan politician and businessman

Minister of Public Infrastructure
- In office 10 February 2009 – 17 January 2013
- President: Johnson Toribiong
- Preceded by: Office established
- Succeeded by: Charles I. Obichang

Governor of Peleliu
- In office 1 January 2004 – 14 February 2009
- Preceded by: Timarong Sisior
- Succeeded by: Kalbesang Soalablai
- In office 1 January 1995 – 1 January 2001
- Preceded by: Hinao Soalablai
- Succeeded by: Timarong Sisior

Personal details
- Born: Jackson R. Ngiraingas
- Party: Independent
- Spouse: Terry Eledui Ngiraingas
- Children: 1
- Occupation: Politician; businessman

Jackson R. Ngiraingas is a Palauan politician and businessman who served as Governor of Peleliu from 1995 to 2001 and 2004 to 2009. He resigned during his fourth term to become Minister of Public Infrastructure from 2009 to 2013.

== Career ==
Ngiraingas first served as governor for two terms from 1995 to 2001 succeeding Hinao Soalablai during which the Supreme Court of Palau found that he had unlawfully expended public funds and failed to comply with state laws which required him to inform the legislature about disbursements and transfer of funds. Incumbent governor Timarong Sisior decided not to run in the December 2003 election in which Ngiraingas was able to win his third term. He received 230 votes whilst runner-ups Postol Remeliik and Kangichi Uchau received 146 votes and 123 votes, respectively.

In March 2006, he asked the Senate of Palau to conduct an investigation into numerous allegations of conflicts of interest against President Thomas Remengesau Jr., Minister of State Temmy Shmull, Minister of Finance Elbuchel Sadang and First Lady Debbie Remengesau. He was a candidate for vice president as the running mate of Joshua Koshiba in the 2008 Palauan general election, in which they finished fourth with 1,387 votes. In 2009, whilst serving his fourth term as Governor of Peleliu he resigned to join Johnson Toribiong's government as Minister of Public Infrastructure. He was sworn in on 14 February 2009 and was succeeded as governor by Kangichi Uchau in a special election. He unsuccessfully ran for vice president in the 2012 Palauan general election in which he came fourth in the primary with 969 votes and just over 10% of the vote.

He unsuccessfully ran for re-election as Governor of Peleliu against incumbent Temmy Shmull in the December 2015 election. In December 2018, he unsuccessfully ran for re-election again in which he received 265 votes behind Shmull's 309 votes. In April 2020, he sued Shmull for violating the Open Government Act by not responding to his letters requesting information in 2015. In July 2021, he filed a lawsuit against Vice President and Minister of Justice Uduch Sengebau Senior claiming that she had "failed to issue a proper warning" of Typhoon Surigae, the case was dismissed by the Supreme Court of Palau in January 2023. In December 2021, Shmull stepped down having reached the term limit and Ngiraingas unsuccessfully ran for re-election for a third time. Unofficial results from an election poll showed him receiving 174 votes behind former Minister of Health Emais Roberts who received 312 votes.

== Personal life ==
His wife Terry Eledui Ngiraingas served as a legal secretary for a law firm from 1984 to 1993 and Executive Secretary to the Chief Justice from 1998 to 2000. She also became the first former first lady to seek public office when she successfully ran as a candidate for Legislature-At-Large. Their son Terepkul Ngiraingas received a medical scholarship from the Cuban government.

Political offices
Preceded by Hinao Soalablai	Governor of Peleliu; 1995-2001	Succeeded by Timarong Sisior
Preceded by Timarong Sisior	Governor of Peleliu; 2004-2009	Succeeded by Kangichi Uchau
Preceded by Office established	Minister of Public Infrastructure; 2009-2013	Succeeded by Charles I. Obichang
