= Kloulklubed =

Town in Palau

- Village
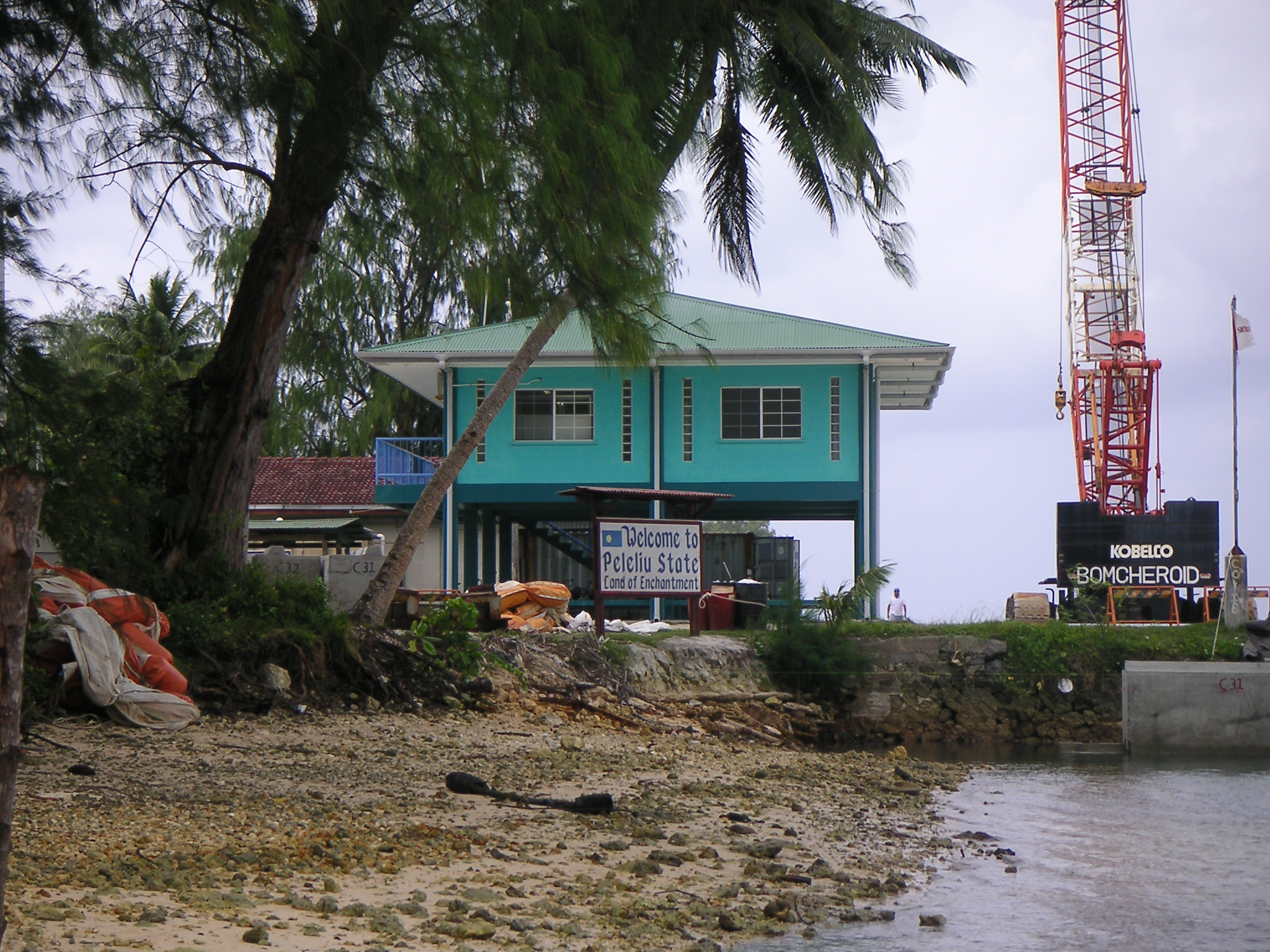
- Peleliu island north dock (2006)

- Location within Palau
- Coordinates (Kloulklubed): 7.04064°N 134.2541313°E

Population
  - Total: 300
- Time zone: UTC+9 (Greenwich Mean Time)

Kloulklubed, also spelled Klouklubed, is the main settlement on the Palauan island of Peleliu. It is situated at the northern end of the island, located near Imelchol Village and Koska. The village was a centre of Japanese operations during World War II, and the remains of the Japanese communications centre is still standing in the village. A monument to the Battle of Peleliu is also located in the village.

Kloulklubed's other notable feature is the gravesites of Palau's first president and first Chief Justice, Haruo Remeliik and Mamoru Nakamura. Remeliik was assassinated in 1985, while Nakamura died of a heart attack in 1992. Both were natives of Peleliu, and their graves are located close to the centre of the village, near the Governor's office.

== See also ==
- List of cities, towns and villages in Palau

== Sources ==
- Hollywood, Mike (2006). Papa Mike's Palau Islands Handbook. iUniverse. ISBN 9780595376070.
