= Faustina K. Rehuher-Marugg =

Palauan curator and politician

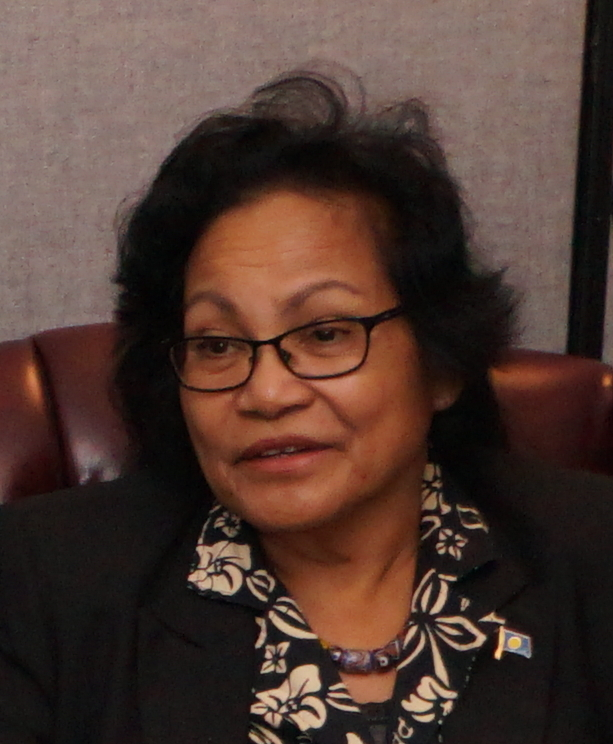

Minister of State
- In office 13 June 2017 – 21 January 2021
- Prime Minister: Thomas Remengesau Jr.
- Preceded by: Billy Kuartei
- Succeeded by: Uduch Sengebau Senior

Minister of Community and Cultural Affairs of Palau
- In office 2009–2012

Personal details
- Party: Independent
- Education: University of Hawaiʻi

Faustina K. Rehuher-Marugg is a Palauan curator and politician who served as the State Minister of Palau from 2017 to 2021. She was Director of Belau National Museum from 1979 to 2009.

== Career ==
Rehuher-Marugg holds a master's degree in Pacific Island Studies from the University of Hawaiʻi and the East-West Center. She worked for as the Director and Curator of the Belau National Museum in Koror for thirty years between 1979 and 2009. During her time as a curator, Rehuher-Marugg promoted Palauan culture to regional and international organisations including ICOMOS and UNESCO. In addition to this, Rehuher-Marugg served in leadership roles in many Pacific cultural organisations, including the Pacific Islands Museums Association, the Pacific Regional Branch of the International Council on Archives, as a co-founder of the Palau Conservation Society, the Palau Resources Institute, and the Palau Chamber of Commerce.

In 2009, Rehuher-Marugg resigned from the Belau National Museum after being nominated to serve as the Minister of Community and Cultural Affairs by President Johnson Toriblong; she was subsequently appointed to the role by a unanimous vote by the Senate of Palau. During her term, Rehuher-Marugg was successful in getting the Rock Islands Southern Lagoon recognised as a UNESCO World Heritage Site. Rehuher-Marugg left the role in 2012. That same year, Rehuher-Marugg was recognised for her contributions to the promotion and development of the arts, culture and history of Palau by the Legislature of Guam.

In June 2017, Rehuher-Marugg was elected to serve as the State Minister in the Cabinet of Thomas Remengesau Jr, replacing Billy Kuartei. Remengesau commended her "wealth of experience in public service [and] the preservation of Palau's heritage and history". She was sworn into office by Judge Rosemary Skebong.

In 2018, Rehuher-Marugg was instrumental in securing a $60,000 grant from the Australian government to support Palau's eco-pledge initiative where all visitors promise to respect the environment. The same year, she represented Palau at the Pacific Islands Forum, held in Nauru, where climate crisis was the focus of the agenda. In 2019, she led a delegation from Taiwan, including President Tsai Ing-wen. In 2021 she negotiated a grant aid programme with Japan to the value of $4.8 million in order to enable the government of Palau to detect illegal shipping.
