= Ngercheu =

Island in Palau

Coordinates: 7°05′35″N 134°16′40″E

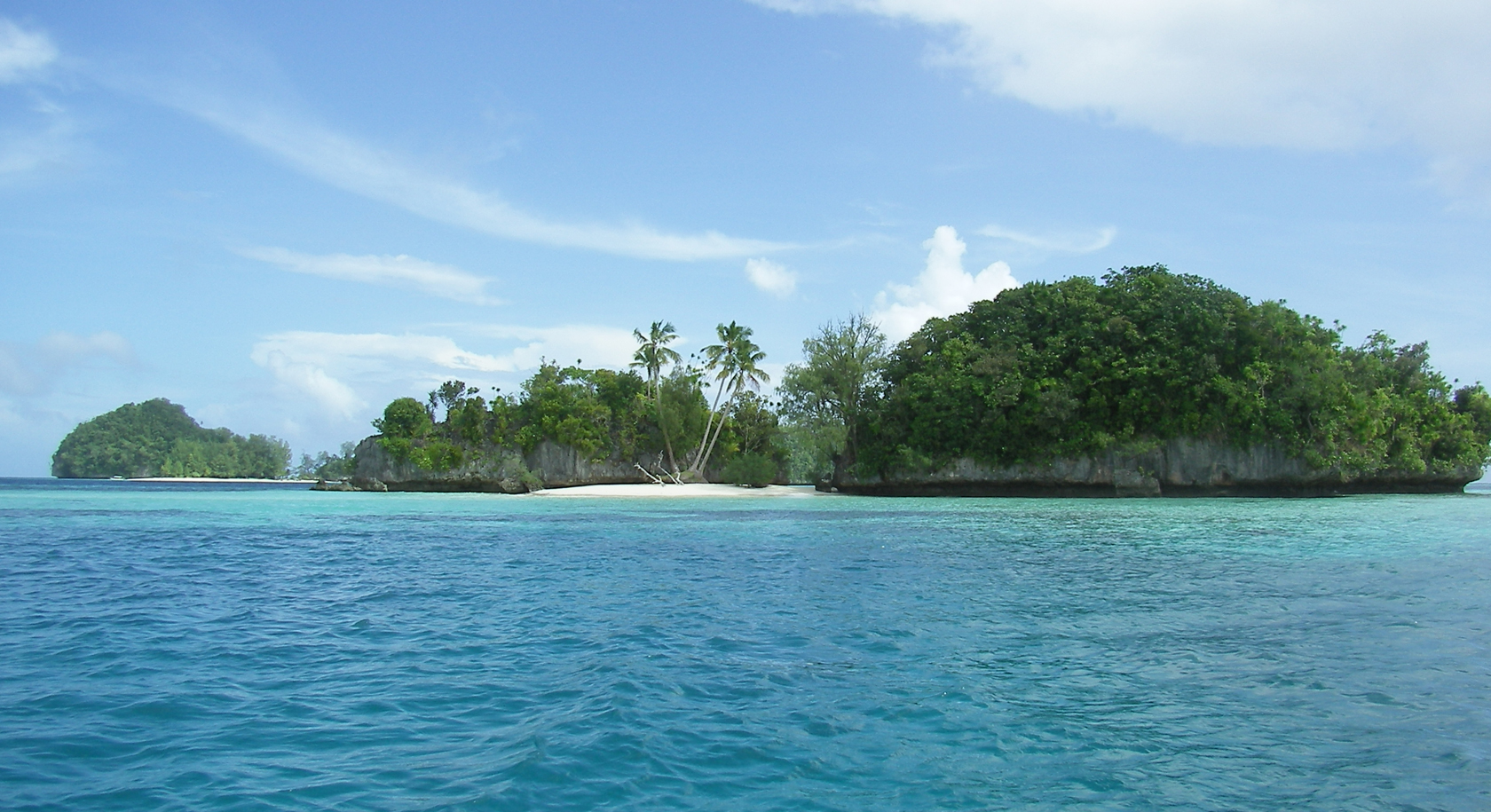
Rock-Islands, Republik Palau

Ngercheu, or Carp Island, is a small island located within the nation of Palau, specifically within the state of Peleliu. Located approximately 10 kilometers north of Peleliu and 61 kilometers southwest of the capital Ngerulmud, it covers an area of about 1 km^{2}. Ngercheu is notable for its long-running land ownership dispute between branches of the Edaruchei clan, which culminated in a series of court decisions between 2021 and 2024. The island is also home to the Carp Island Resort, a private diving resort that attracts tourists for its snorkelling and scuba diving activities.

== Geography and location ==
Ngercheu is located 10 km north of the main island of Peleliu and 61 km southwest of Ngerulmud, the capital of Palau. Ngercheu is roughly 1 km^{2}, star-shaped, and densely forested.

== History ==
The ownership of Ngercheu has been the subject of a long-standing legal dispute. The High Court of the Trust Territory government originally awarded the island to the Edaruchei clan, but did not specify which branch of the clan. This led to claims, first raised in 1990, from different villages of Peleliu. The parties making the claims are "Uchelmekediu Ichiro Loitang" represented by Joseph Koshiba on behalf of the Edaruchei clan of Ngerkeyukl "Idesiar Santos Olikong" on behalf of the Edaruchei clan of Ngerdelolk. Also, pertinent to the dispute is a rumour that the Ngerkeyukl party leased the island to investors for millions of dollars, with that investment pending the outcome of the case. In December 2021, a trial court declared the Edaruchei clan of Ngerdelolk as the owner of the island, being convinced by witnesses and documents that Rubasech Fritz who filed the claim on behalf of the Edaruchei clan in 1958 was a member of the clan of Ngerdelolk. Three years later, in April 2024, an appellate court decision reversed the 2021 decision and declared the Edaruchei clan of Ngerkeyukl as the owner of the island, following documentation of clan members living on the island and also ancestral gravesites.

== Tourism ==
On Ngercheu is the Carp Island Resort, which is a budget option on the beach for tourists and offers scuba diving, snorkelling and island exploration. It is the only private diving resort among the islands.
