= Governor of Peleliu =

Government office in Palau

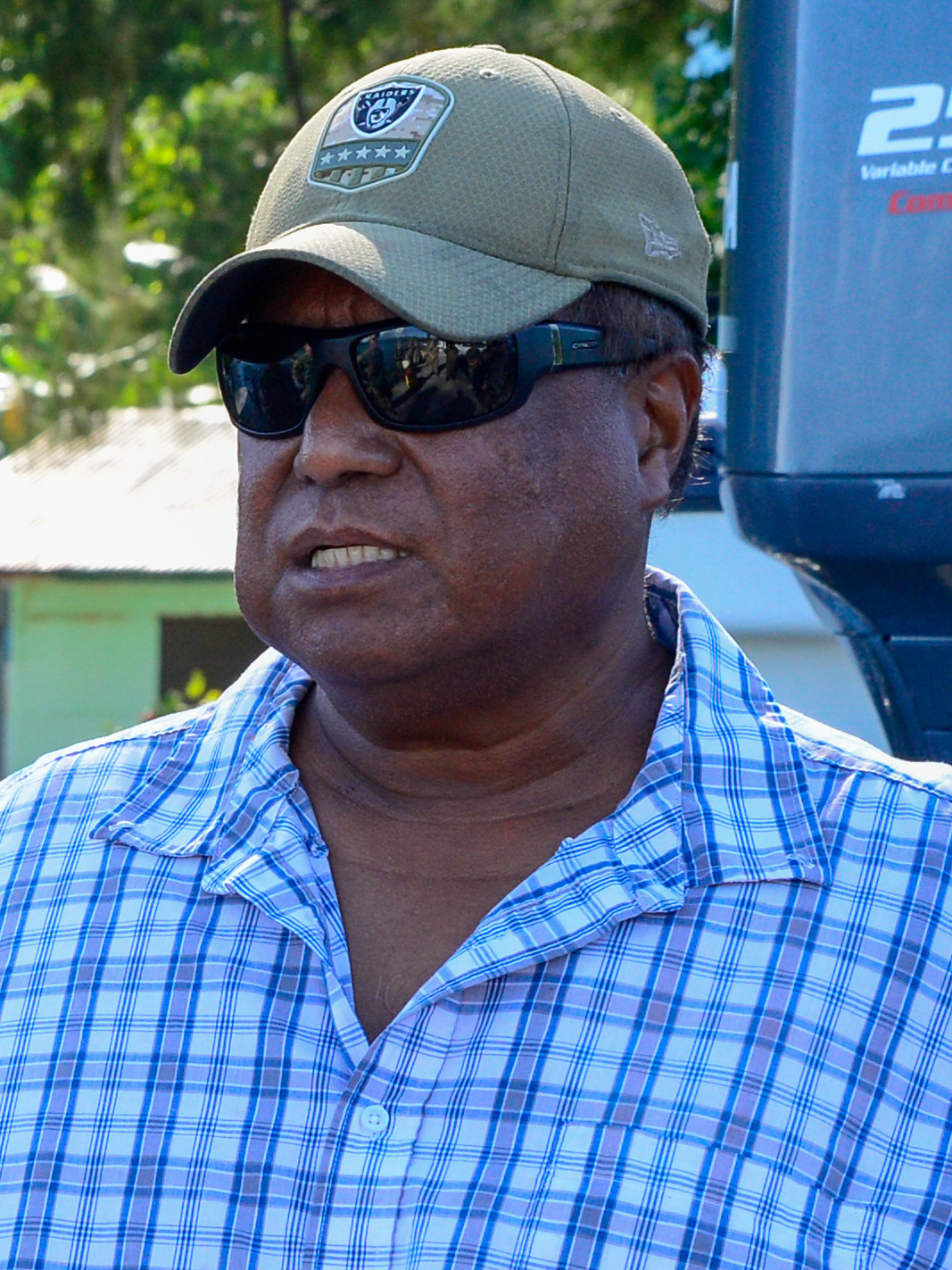
- Incumbent; Emais Roberts since 1 January 2022
- Term length: Three years
- Inaugural holder: Yukio Shmull
- Formation: 1983
- Website: https://www.palaugov.pw/states/peliliu/

The governor of Peleliu is the head of government of Peleliu. The position was established in 1983 and a new governor is sworn in on 1 January unless they resign during their term. It is the only state in Palau to have elections every three years instead of every two or four years.

== Regulations ==
Article VII of the Peleliu constitution states that to be eligible for governor a person "must be a citizen of Palau and a person of Peleliu". They must also be at least 35 years old, must not have been convicted of a felony at the time of an election, unless pardoned, and can not be employed by the state government, national government or serve in the Palau National Congress concurrently whilst governor.

Furthermore, it states that the governor shall be elected in a state-wide election for a term of 3 years and that a person can not serve as governor for more than 3 consecutive terms. Additionally, the governor must reside in the state during their term. The governor may be impeached and removed from office for treason, bribery or other serious crimes by a vote of no less than two-thirds of the members of the state legislature. If the office becomes vacant and there is more than 180 days remaining in the unexpired term, the speaker of the house becomes governor and must call a special election within 30 days to fill the vacancy.

== List of governors ==
| No. | Picture | Name | Term of office | | |
| No. | Picture | Name | Took office | Left office | Time in office |
|---|---|---|---|---|---|
| 1 | | Yukio Shmull (died 2018) | 1 January 1983 | 1 January 1986 | 3 years, 0 days |
| 2 | | Timarong Sisior | 1 January 1986 | 1 January 1992 | 6 years, 0 days |
| 3 | | Hinao Soalablai | 1 January 1992 | 1 January 1995 | 3 years, 0 days |
| 4 | | Jackson Ngiraingas | 1 January 1995 | 1 January 2001 | 6 years, 0 days |
| 5 | | Timarong Sisior | 1 January 2001 | 1 January 2004 | 3 years, 0 days |
| 6 | | Jackson Ngiraingas | 1 January 2004 | 14 February 2009 | 5 years, 44 days |
| - | | Kalbesang Soalablai (acting) | 14 February 2009 | 17 March 2009 | 31 days |
| 7 | | Kangichi Uchau | 17 March 2009 | January 1, 2013 | 3 years, 290 days |
| 8 | | Temmy Shmull (1947–2025) | 1 January 2013 | 1 January 2022 | 9 years, 0 days |
| 9 | | Emais Roberts | 1 January 2022 | Incumbent | 4 years, 249 days |

== See also ==
- List of current state governors in Palau

== Notes ==
^{A} This is most likely an error as according to sources, he was governor for just over 11 years.
