= Kangichi Uchau =

Palauan politician

Governor of Peleliu
- In office 17 March 2009 – 1 January 2013
- Preceded by: Kalbesang Soalablai
- Succeeded by: Temmy Shmull

Personal details
- Political party: Independent
- Relatives: Caleb T. O. Otto (cousin)
- Occupation: Politician

Kangichi Uchau is a Palauan politician who served as Governor of Peleliu from 2009 to 2013.

== Career ==
He unsuccessfully ran for Governor of Peleliu in the December 2003 election receiving 123 votes behind Jackson Ngiraingas who received 230 votes and Postol Remeliik who received 146 votes. In February 2009, Ngiraingas resigned as Governor of Peleliu to join the government and a special election was held the following month in which Uchau received 262 votes and Johannes Tsuneo received 109 votes. Uchau was sworn in on 17 March 2009. He won a full term in the December 2009 election in which he defeated former senator Caleb T. O. Otto who was his cousin. He was succeeded as governor by Temmy Shmull.

Political offices
Preceded by Kalbesang Soalablai	Governor of Peleliu; 2009-2013	Succeeded by Temmy Shmull
