= Belau National Museum =

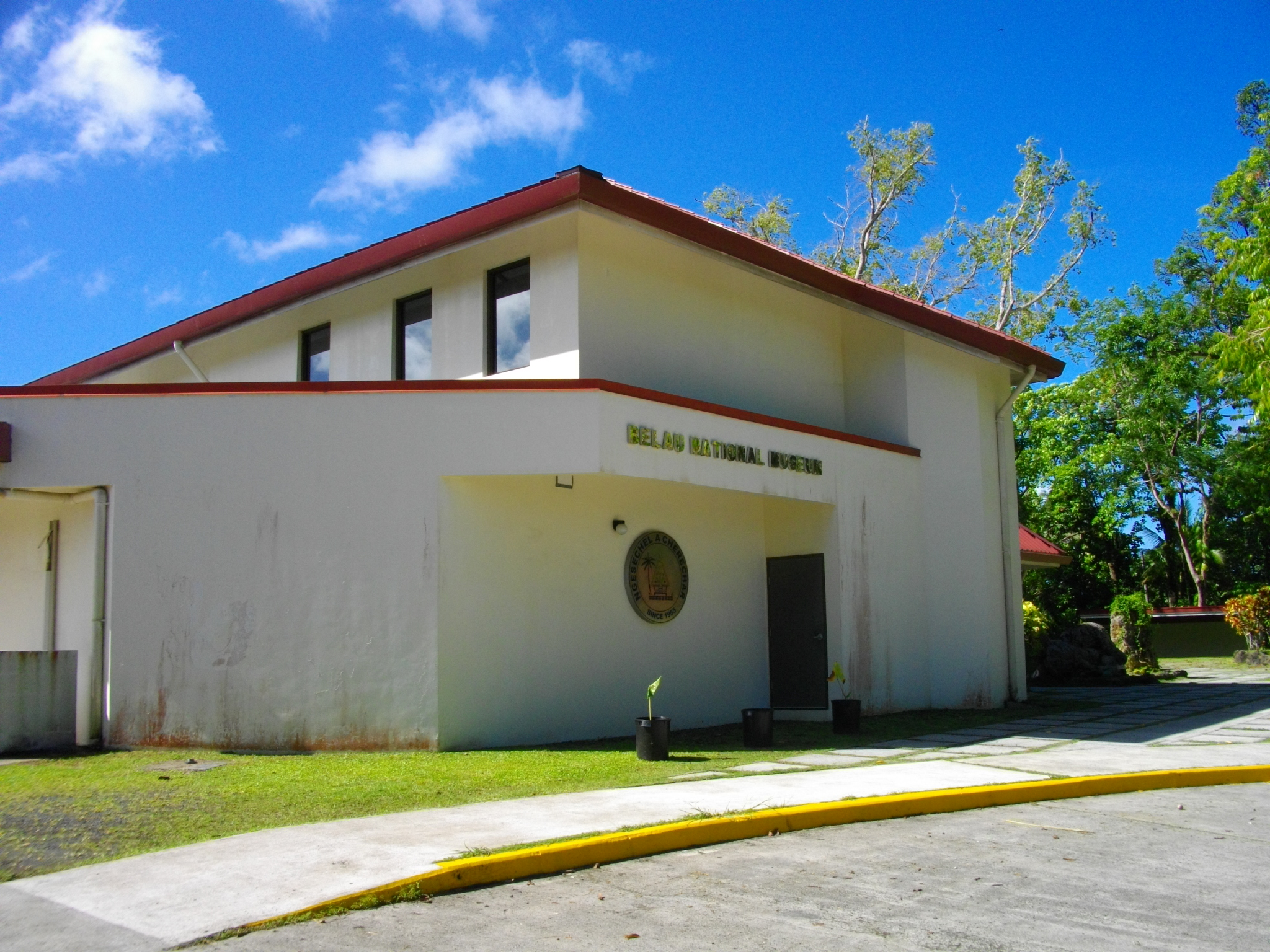
- Former name: Palau Museum
- Established: 1955
- Location: Koror, Palau
- Coordinates: 7°20′11″N 134°28′34″E
- Type: National museum
- Director: Olympia E. Morei-Remengesau
- Website: belaunationalmuseum.pw

The Belau National Museum (BNM), previously Palau Museum, is a museum in Koror, Palau. It is the oldest continuously run museum in Micronesia.

== History ==
The museum was established in 1955. It is the oldest continually running museum in Micronesia; initially called Palau Museu, it later changed its name. The original founders included Palauans Indalecio Rudimch, Francisco Morei, Alphonso Oiterong and anthropologist Francis M Mahoney. Originally located in the former Japanese Administration Weather Bureau, the museum was later relocated to a new building, which was funded by the Government of the Republic of China. From 1955 until its location move in 1970, the museum was run by a Museum Committee. In 1970 the museum was relocated to a two-storey building in Palau Botanical Garden.

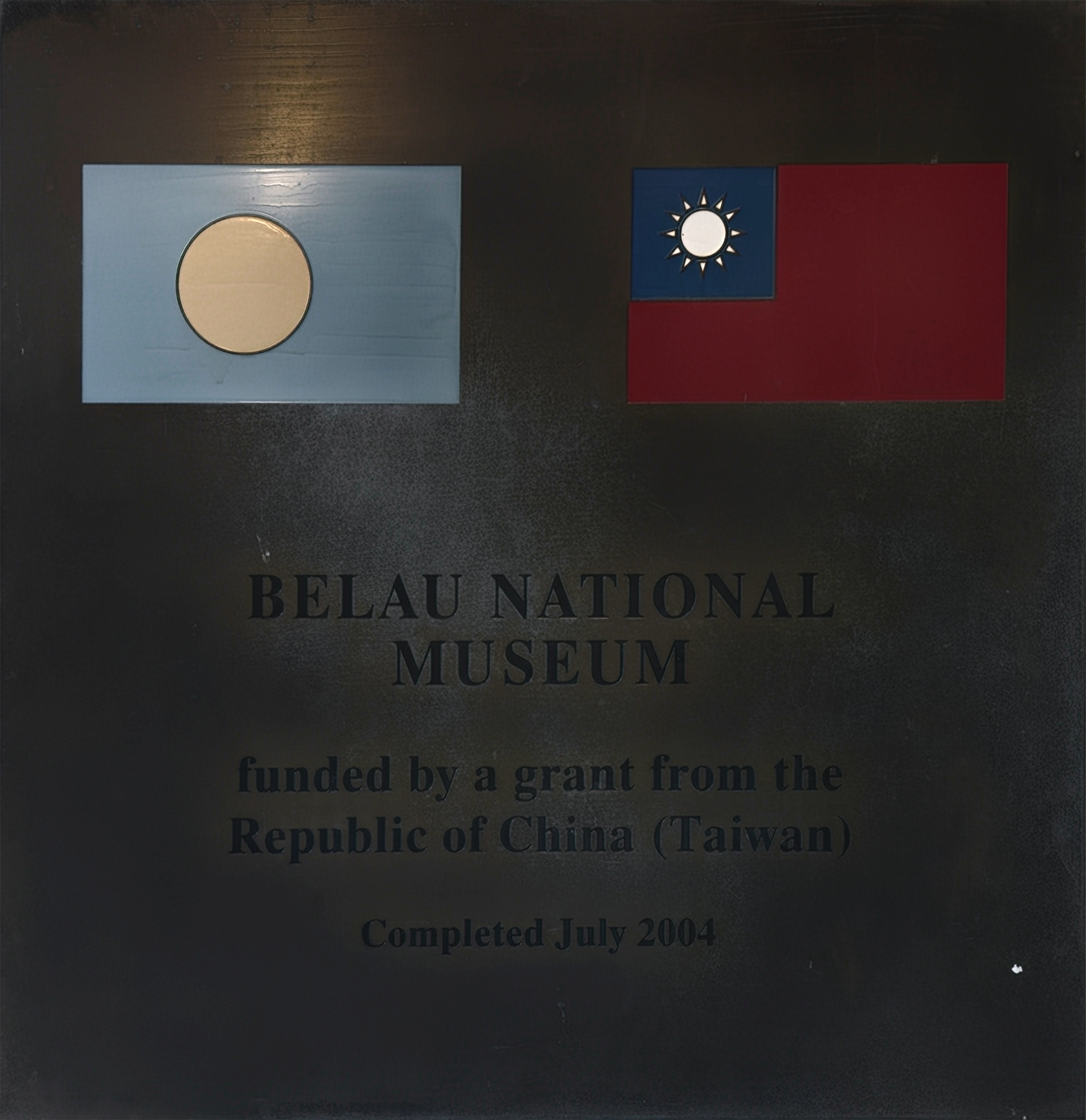
Funding plaque at the Belau National Museum, Palau, completed in July 2004 with support from the Republic of China (Taiwan)

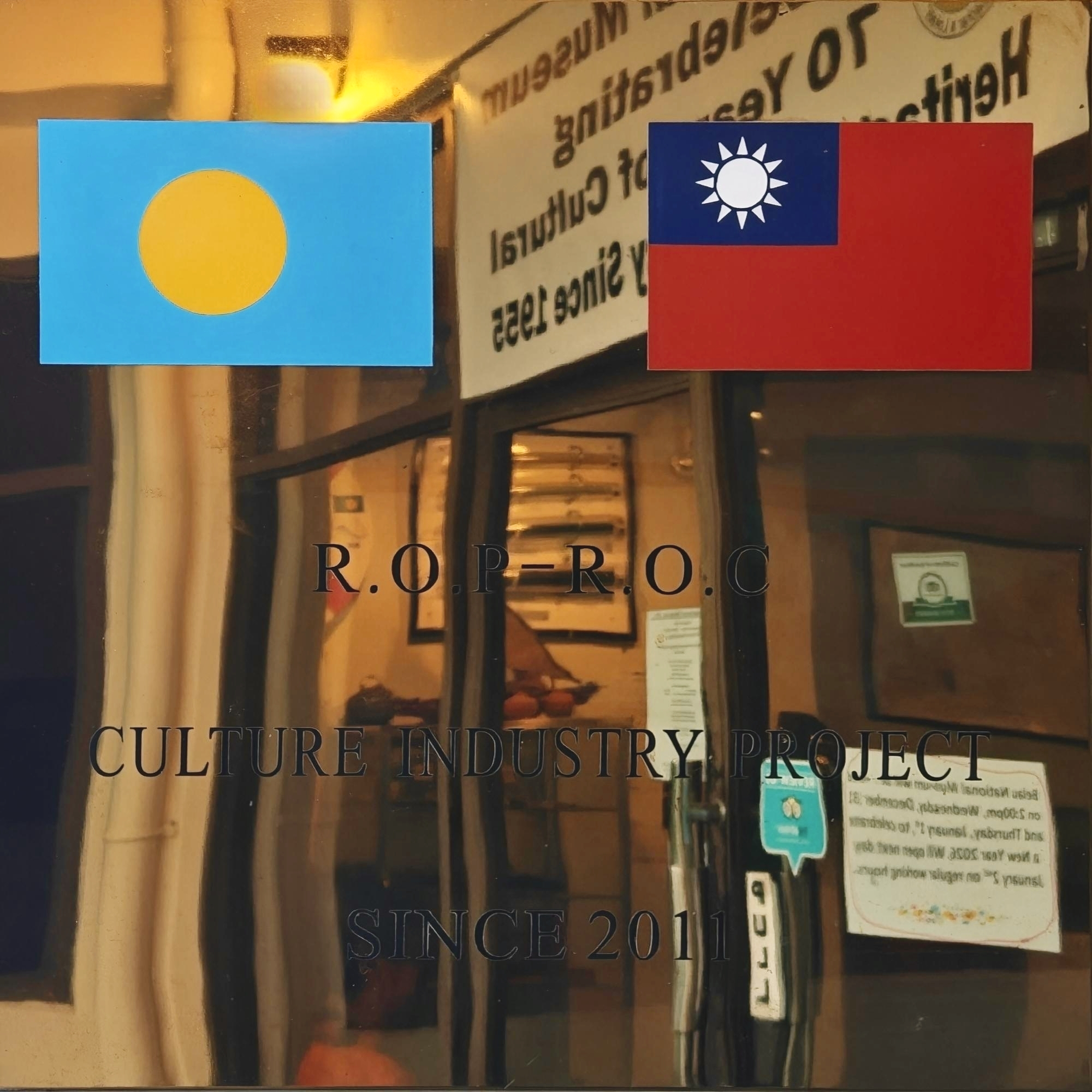
R.O.P. — R.O.C. Culture Industry Project Plaque at Belau National Museum

In 1973 the museum's administrative structure changed to a non-profit organisation governed by a board of trustees.

== Building ==
The museum has two exhibition spaces, an air-conditioned photographic archive, offices and shop. As of 2006, the first floor exhibition space displayed Palau's traditional culture and arts, including bead money (udoud) and the house-buying ceremony known as ocheraol.

In the wider museum compound is a library of over 5000 books relating to the history and culture of Palau. There is also a statute of Harruo Remeliik, the first president of Palau.

== Collections ==
The museum exhibits artefacts from all aspects of the local life of Palauan people, such as artworks, photography, sculptures etc. However, according to Philip Dark, due to a lack of security in the museum, by 1988 several important objects had been stolen.

In 1988 the collection consisted of over 1,000 objects relating to the historical, anthropological and biological histories of the country. There are several hundred images in the photographic collection, many of which are from periods of Japanese and German colonial occupation. This archive was an important aspect of a research project undertaken in the mid-2000s to document life under Japanese colonial rule. In 2003 the media collection underwent a digitisation programme, funded by a U.S. Institute of Museum and Library Services (IMLS) National Leadership Grant.

The museum has also been active in recording Palau's intangible cultural heritage, including taro production. As part of the museum's acquisition process, makers of works that are being accessioned into the collection are interviewed and the process of making is recorded.

In 2017 the museum's natural science department led a survey of bird life at the world heritage site of the Rock Islands' southern lagoon. The same year the museum signed a memorandum of understanding with the National Museum (Prague) to deepen scientific relations between the countries.

=== Bai ===
In 1969 a traditional village meeting house known as a bai, was constructed in order to showcase and preserve traditional building styles and skills. However it burnt down on 13 October 1979. In the early 1990s the bai was rebuilt using traditional methods and is a key feature of the museum today.

==== Gallery ====
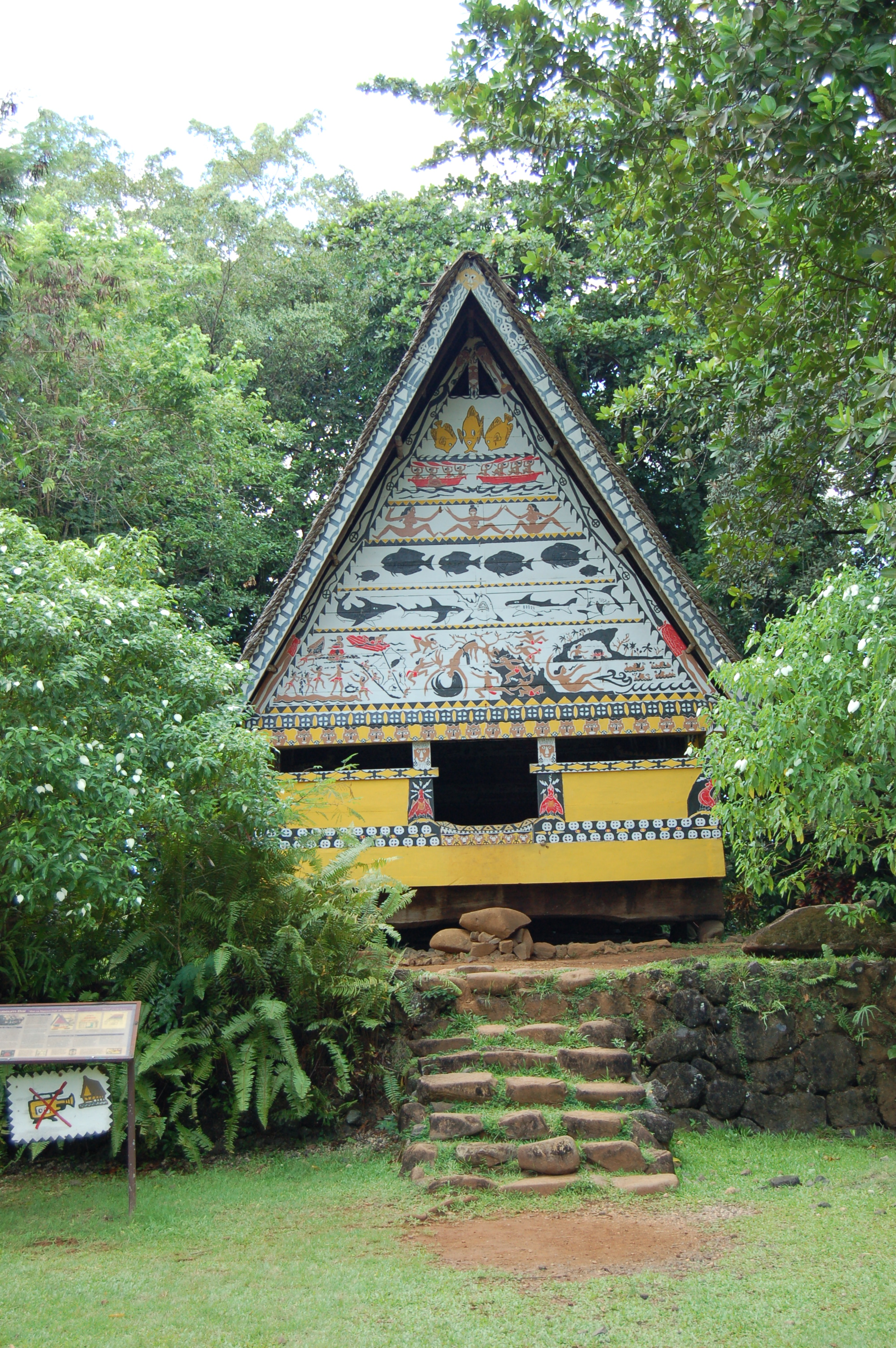
Reconstructed bai (2007)

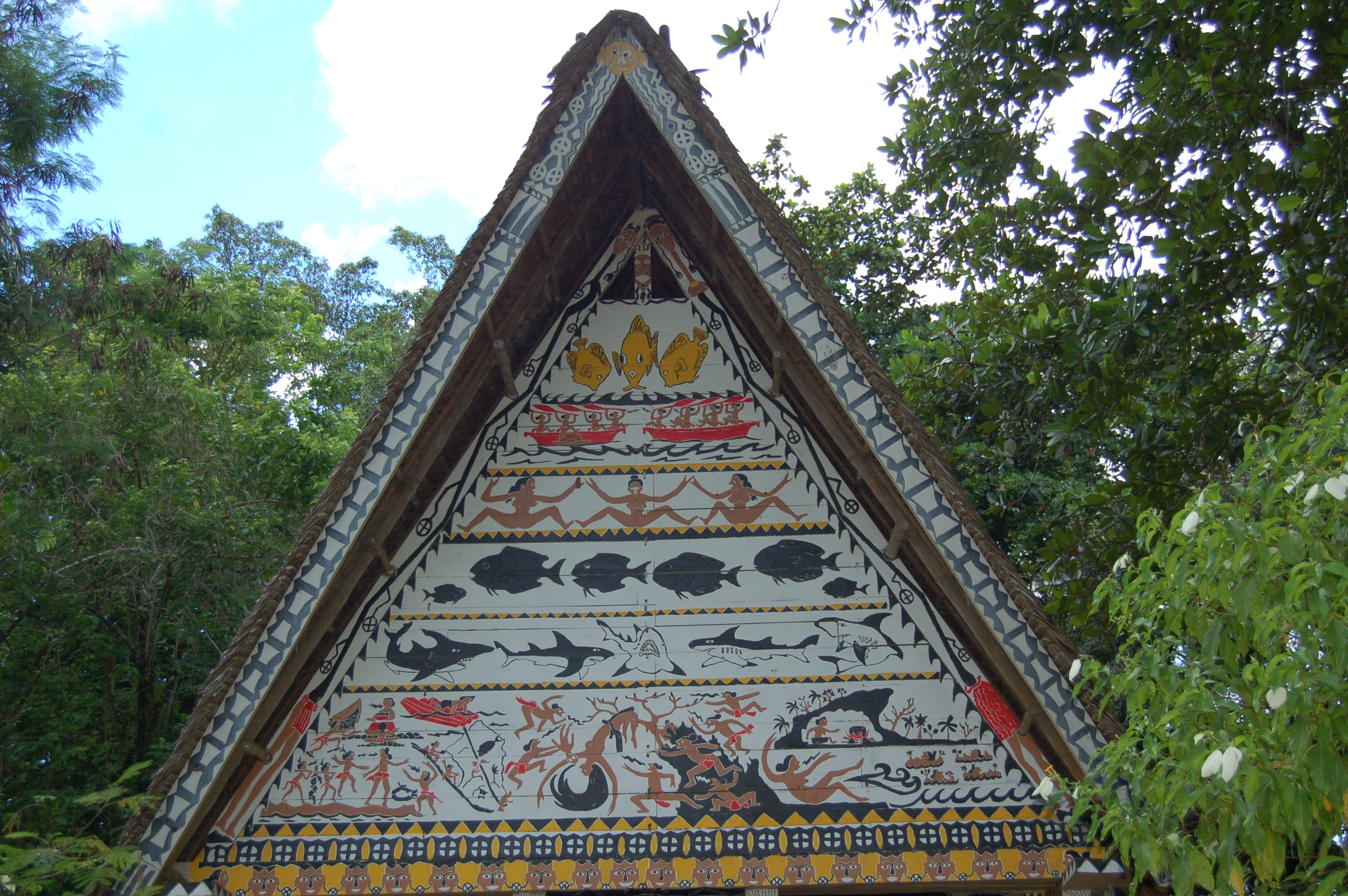
Details on the bai

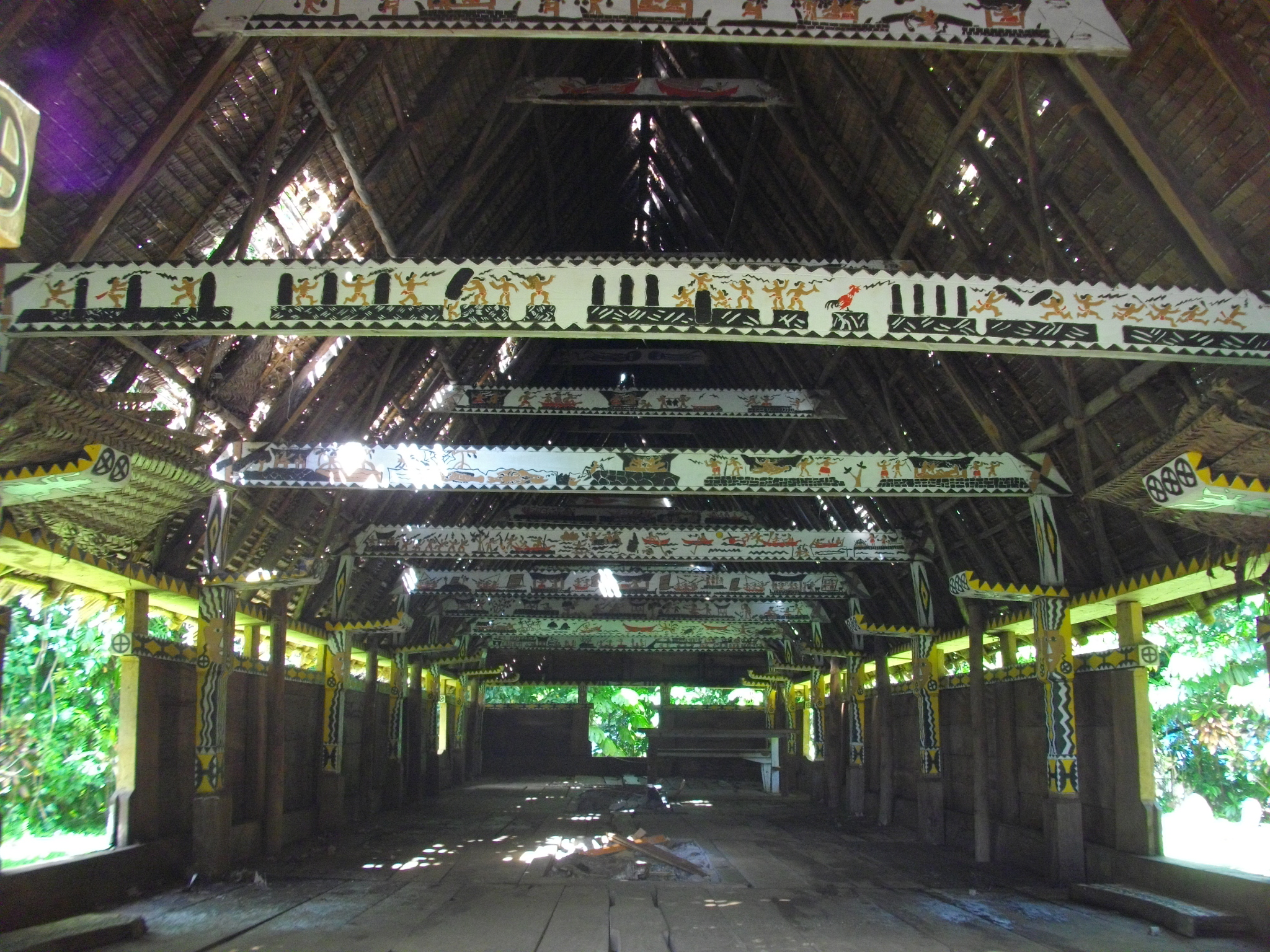
Interior of the bai

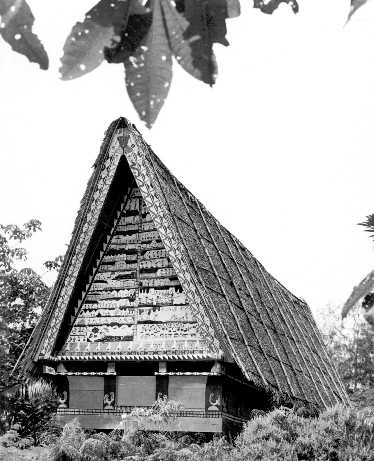
The first bai, c.1970s

=== Overseas collections ===
Due to legacies of colonialism, important aspects of Palauan heritage are held in collections overseas. These include; recordings of traditional music held at the Berliner Phonogramm-Archiv, chiefly costume held at Glasgow Museums, pandanus fibre mats from Sonsorol at National Museums Scotland. They also include Palauan material from the eighteenth century held in the British Museum: an inlaid, bird-shaped wooden bowl, an oil painting and an inlaid canoe, amongst others.

In 2005 digital assets of field recordings made in Palau in the 1960s were repatriated to the museum.

==== Gallery of Palauan cultural heritage held overseas ====
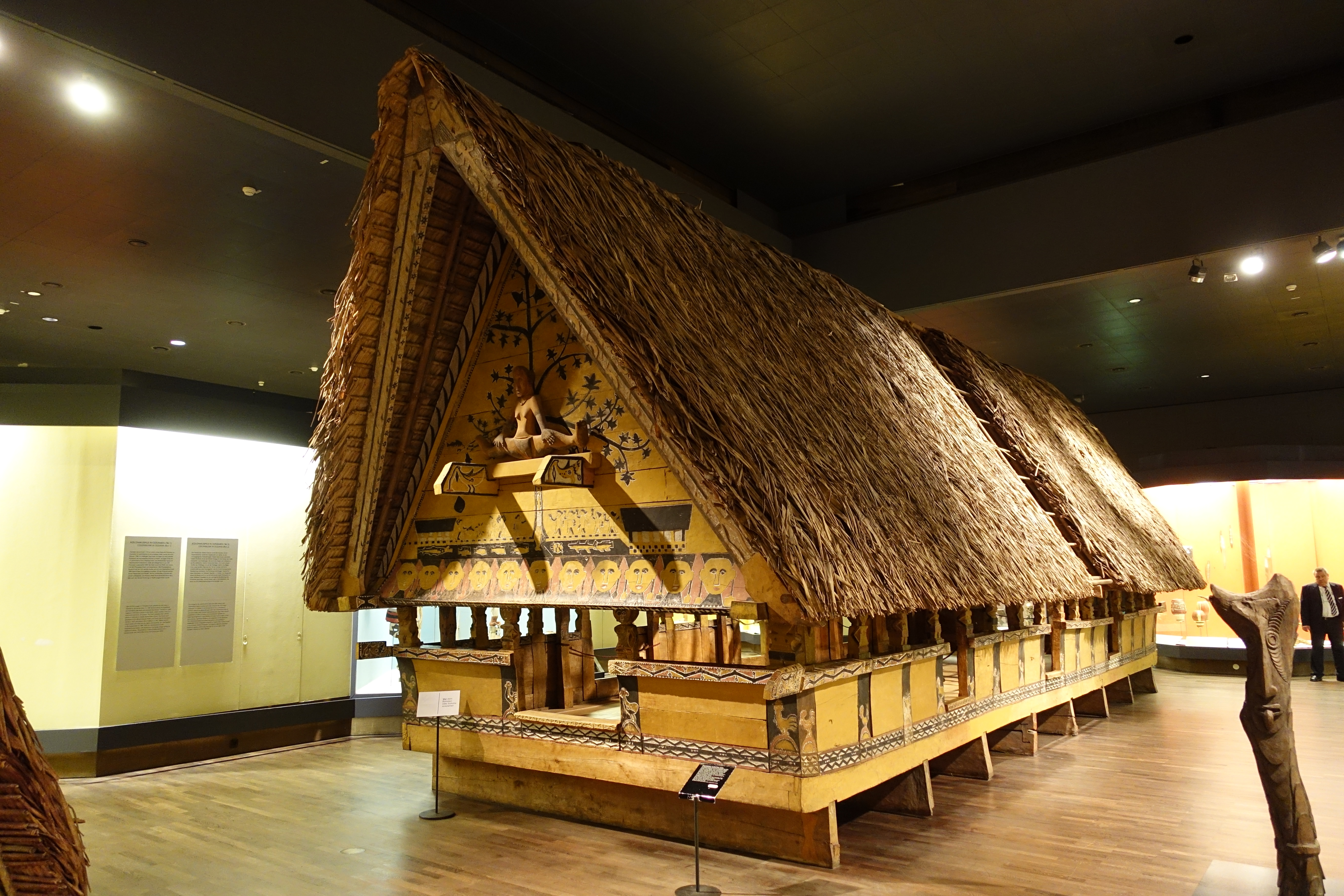
Bai at Ethnological Museum, Berlin

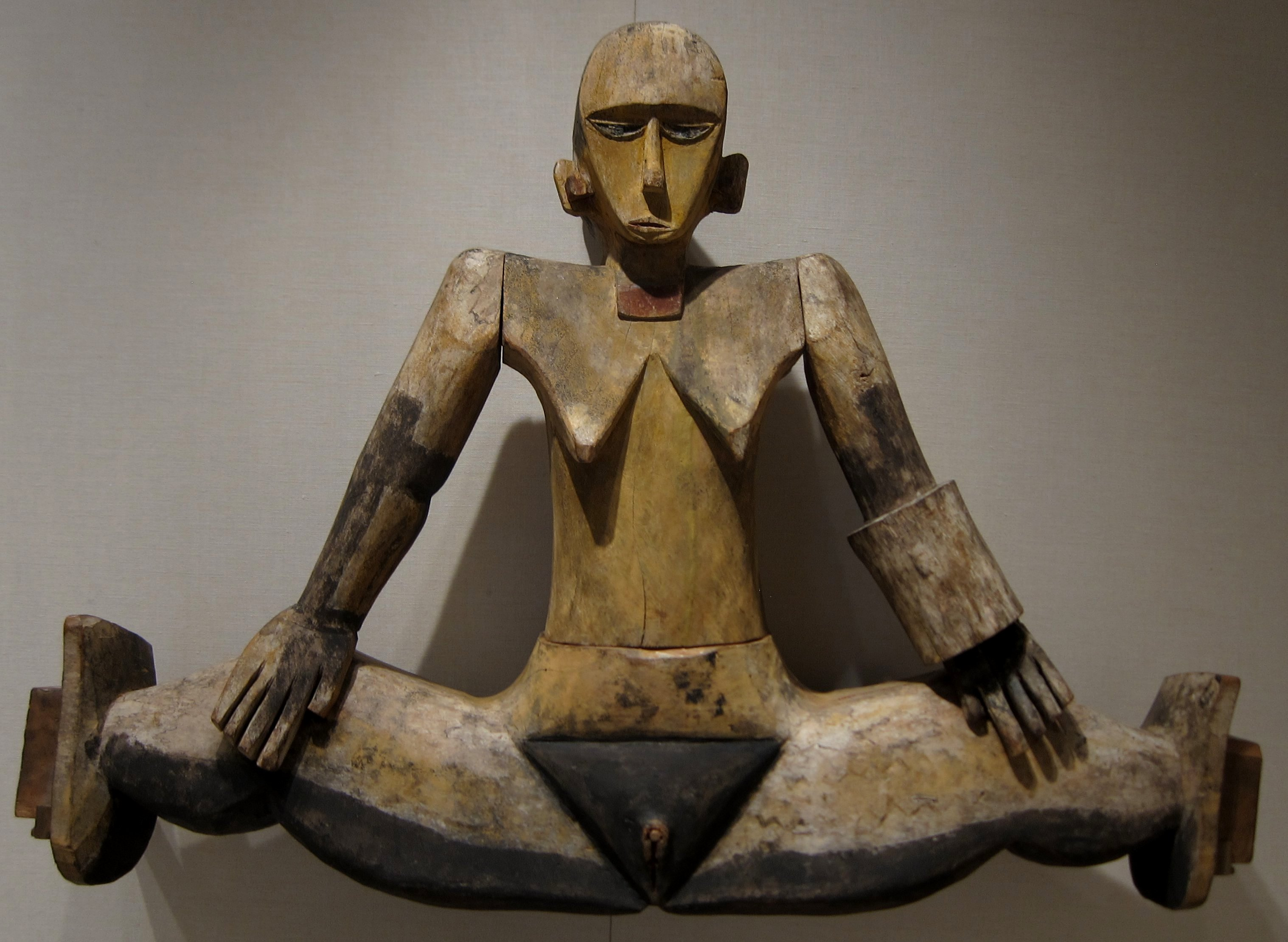
Dilukai from the Caroline Islands, Belau (Palau), 19th-early 20th century, Metropolitan Museum of Art

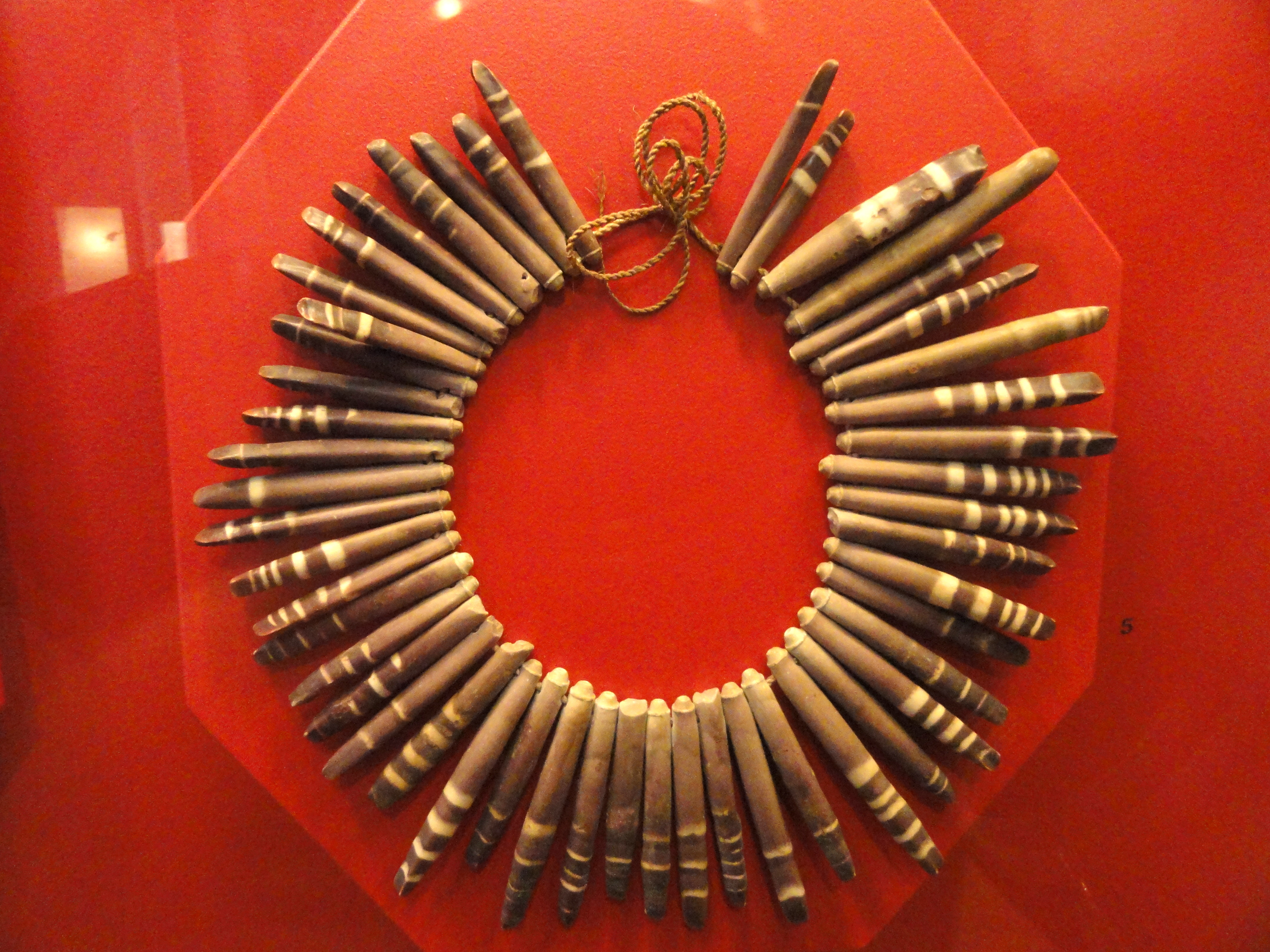
Sea urchin spine necklace, Staatlichen Museums für Völkerkunde München

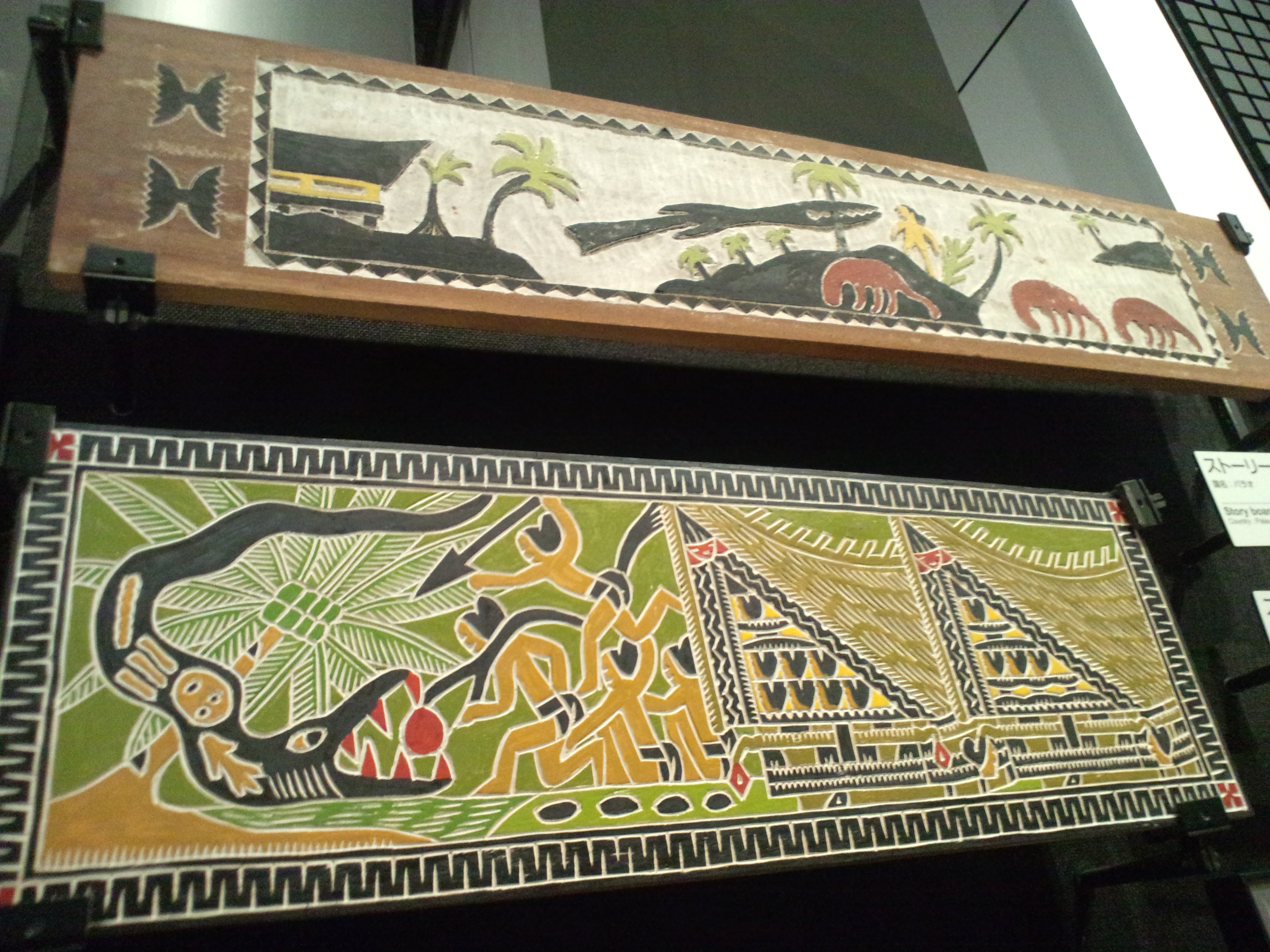
Storyboards, National Museum Ethnology, Osaka

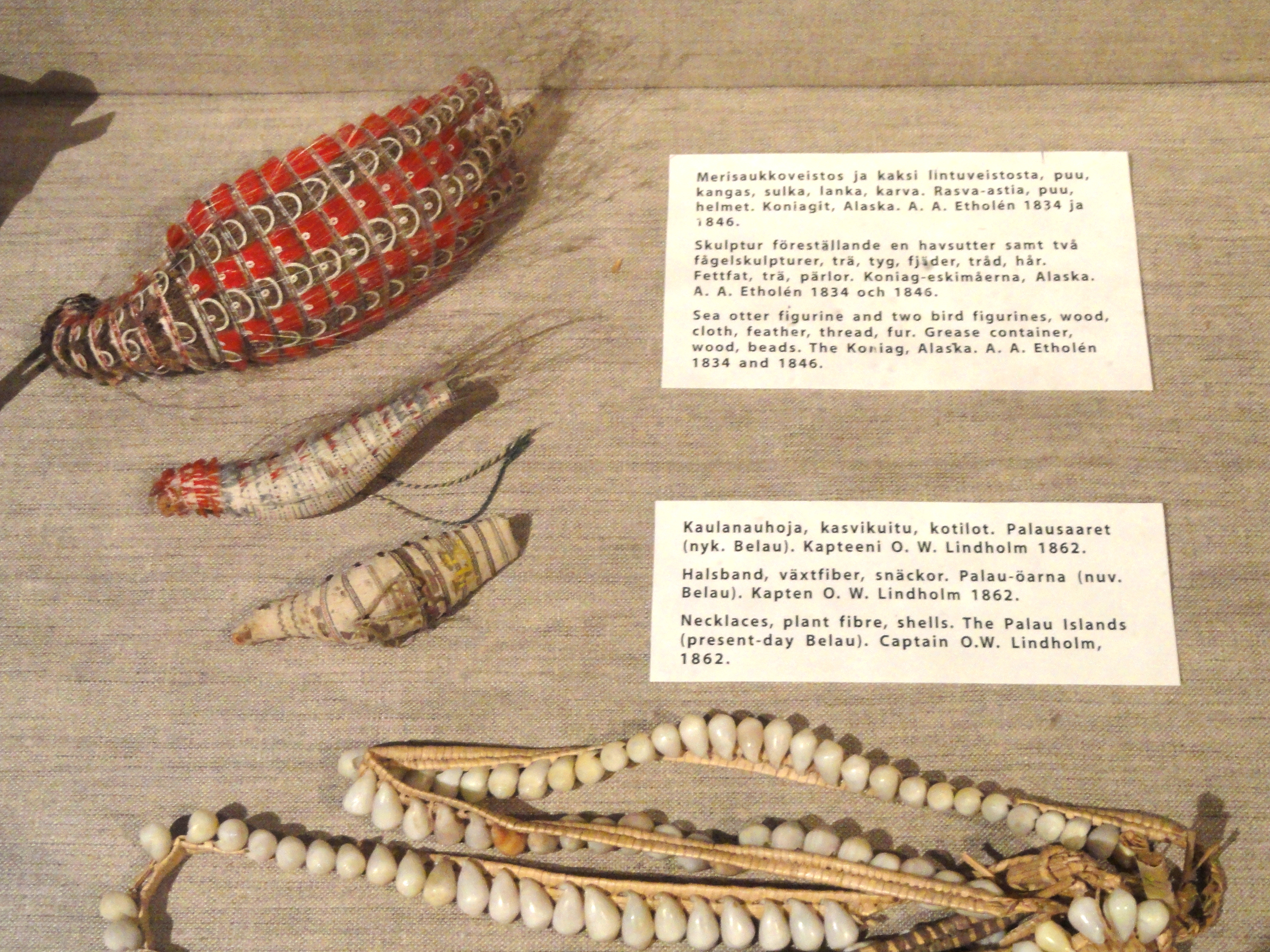
Alaskan and Palauan objects in National Museum of Finland.

== Notable people ==
- Faustina K. Rehuher-Marugg (1979 - 2009).
- Olympia E. Morei-Remengesau (2009 to present).

== See also ==
- List of national museums
- List of museums in Palau
