= Emais Roberts =

Palauan politician and physician

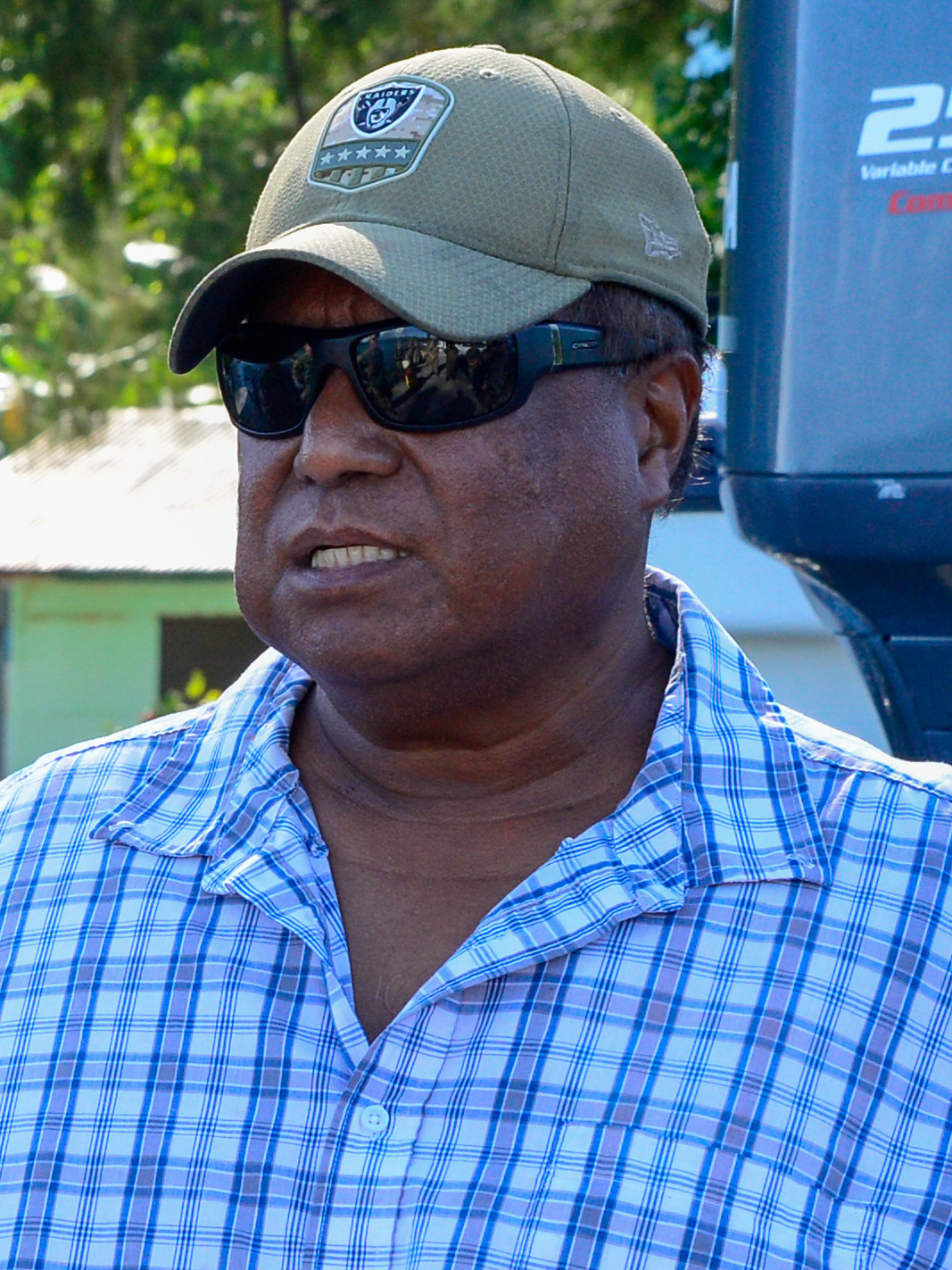
- Roberts in 2023

Governor of Peleliu
- Incumbent
- Assumed office 1 January 2022
- Preceded by: Temmy Shmull

Minister of Health
- In office 2 February 2017 – 21 December 2021
- President: Thomas Remengesau Jr. Surangel Whipps Jr.
- Preceded by: Greg Ngirmang
- Succeeded by: Gaafar Ucherbelau

Personal details
- Party: Independent
- Education: University of California, Davis; University of Hawaiʻi
- Occupation: Politician; physician

Emais Roberts is a Palauan politician and physician who has served as Governor of Peleliu since 2022. He previously served as the country's Minister of Health from 2017 to 2021 and led the response to the COVID-19 pandemic in Palau.

== Early life and career ==
Roberts received his Doctor of Medicine degree from the University of Hawaiʻi. His surgical residency took place at the University of Hawaiʻi and University of California, Davis. He served as Chief Resident Surgeon at Queen's Medical Center, Kuakini Medical Center and Kaiser Medical Center in Hawaii. Roberts is also a member of the Belau Medical Society, in addition to being a fellow of the American College of Surgeons. Robers has served as a member of the Palau Community College Board of Trustees, Palau Medical Licensure Board and Palau Medical Referral Committee. He owns and runs a private medical clinic called the Family Surgical Clinic.

== Political career ==
On 23 January 2017, he was nominated as Minister of Health, becoming the first nominee for a ministerial position in President Thomas Remengesau Jr.'s 10th government cabinet. He was sworn in as Minister of Health on 2 February 2017. On 6 June 2017, Roberts visited Taipei in which he said he would continue to support Taiwan's bid to attend the World Health Assembly. In July 2019, Roberts gave a speech at the first Climate and Health Ministers' Meeting in Abu Dhabi in which he highlighted the effects of climate change on human health especially the effects on Small Island Developing States such as Palau.

Beginning in January 2021, he administered the country's COVID-19 vaccination program, with Roberts and president-elect Surangel Whipps Jr. being two of the first to receive the dose of the vaccine in the country. In April 2021, a travel bubble was set up between Palau and Taiwan though by May 2021 Roberts stated that the travel bubble had become a "mute issue" due to new travel restrictions introduced between the countries as a result of Taiwan's rising COVID-19 cases. He was succeeded as health minister by Gaafar Ucherbelau.

In May 2021, Roberts stated in an interview with the Island Times that he was running as a candidate for Governor of Peleliu in the December 2021 election; incumbent governor Temmy Shmull was no longer eligible, having reached the term limit. He stated that he had agreed to run after being petitioned by the village chiefs and the people of Peleliu. Governor Shmull endorsed him saying that he "has built a house here and loves to spend time here". Unofficial results from an election poll showed him in the lead with 312 votes ahead of former governor Jackson Ngiraingas who received 174 votes. He won the election and was sworn in as governor on 1 January 2022.

On 15 September 2022, Roberts commemorated the state's inaugural veterans day by re-opening the Bloody Nose Ridge Monument access trail and acknowledging the United States Marines for their work on projects in the state such as repairing the monument.

Political offices
Preceded by Greg Ngirmang	Minister of Health; 2017-2021	Succeeded by Gaafar Ucherbelau
Preceded by Temmy Shmull	Governor of Peleliu; 2022-present	Incumbent
