= Peleliu =

- State
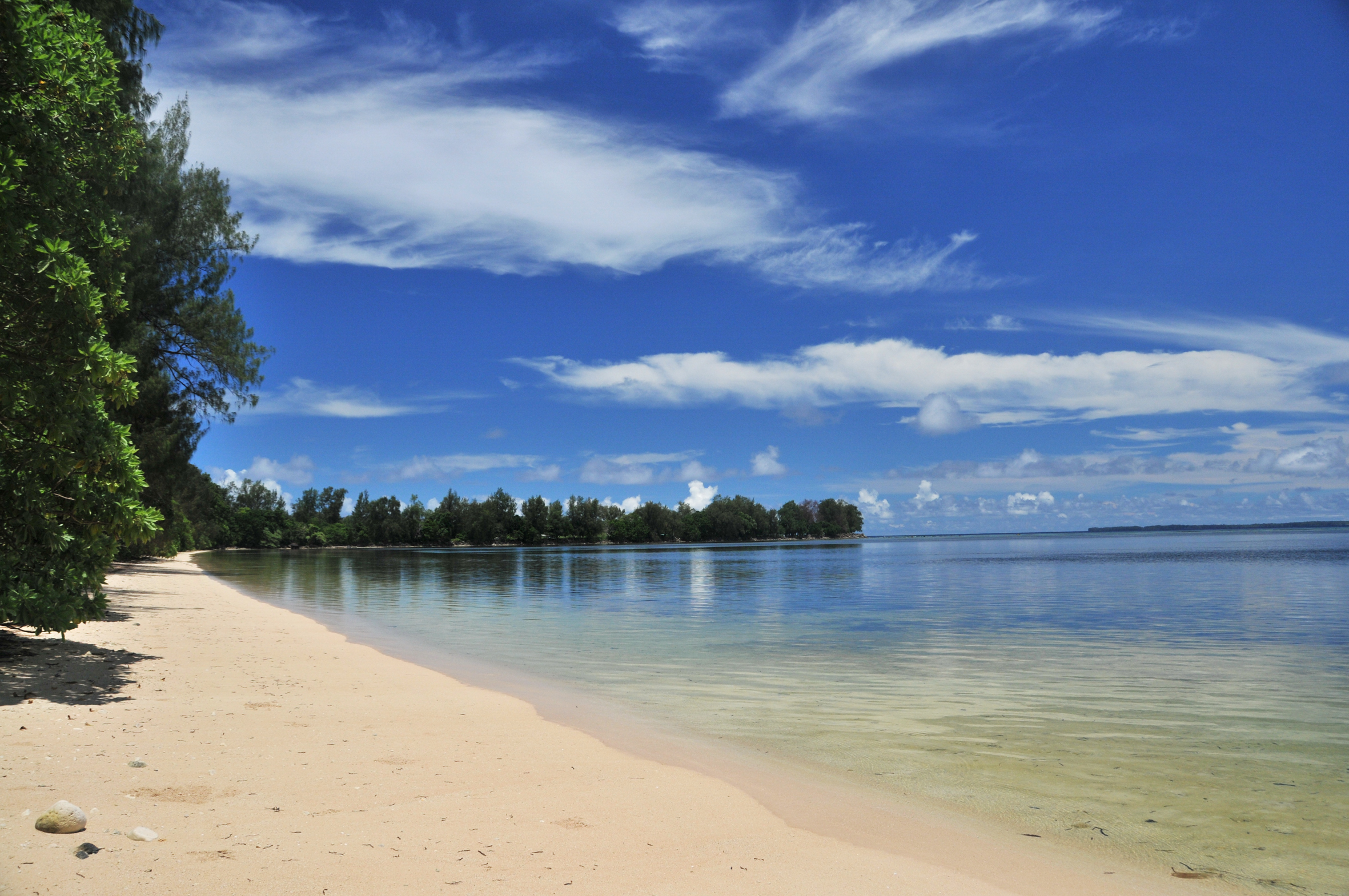
- Orange Beach, Peleliu

- Flag

- Location of Peleliu in Palau
- Coordinates: 7°0′N 134°15′E
- Country: Palau
- Capital: Kloulklubed

Government
  - Body: Peleliu State Legislature
  - Governor: Emais Roberts

Area
  - Total: 13 km^{2} (5.0 sq mi)

Population (2015 Census)
  - Total: 484
  - Density: 37/km^{2} (96/sq mi)
  - Official languages: Palauan; English
- ISO 3166 code: PW-228

Peleliu (or Beliliou) is an island in the island nation of Palau. Peleliu, along with two small islands to its northeast, forms one of the sixteen states of Palau. The island is notable as the location of the Battle of Peleliu in World War II.

== History ==
Peleliu was traditionally divided into five villages. Teliu is located on the southwest coast bordered on the north by Ngerkeiukl on the west coast, Ngesias in the central portion of the island, and Ngerdelolk on the east coast. Ngerchol occupies the northern part of the island on the west side of Bloody Nose Ridge. Most of the surface remains of the traditional villages have been obliterated. However, the locations of the villages and the locations of features within the villages, including odesongel, are known and preserved in the oral tradition. These traditional features are important symbols giving identity to families, clans and regions.

The lagoon and adjacent rock islands are important resource areas, and probably were intensively exploited prehistorically. Important resources include many different species of trees and other plants and many different species of fish and shellfish. On the islands, traditional gardens would have been located in areas where sufficient soil had accumulated in low lying pockets and marshes.

First sighting of Peleliu, Babeldaob, and Koror recorded by Westerners was by the Spanish expedition of Ruy López de Villalobos at the end of January 1543. They were then charted as Los Arrecifes ("The Reefs" in Spanish). In November and December 1710 these three islands were again visited and explored by the Spanish missionary expedition commanded by Sargento Mayor Francisco Padilla on board of the patache Santísima Trinidad. Two years later they were explored in detail by the expedition of Spanish naval officer Bernardo de Egoy. Following its defeat in the Spanish–American War, Spain sold Palau (including Peleliu) to Germany in 1899. Control passed to Japan in 1914.

During World War II, the Battle of Peleliu was a major battle between units of the United States Marine Corps and United States Army against the Imperial Japanese Army in 1944. The battle for the island was particularly brutal because by this time the Japanese military had developed island defense tactics with strong fortifications in the island's caves and rock formations within the Umurbrogol Mountains (Bloody Nose Ridge), which enabled a defense in depth which maximized casualties on the attacking force. On both sides involved in the fighting, there were high losses with more than 2,000 Americans and 10,000 Japanese killed. There were no casualties among the local civilians because they had been evacuated from Peleliu to other islands of Palau in 1943.

The ruins of many of the military installations of the era, such as the airstrip, are still intact, and shipwrecks from the battle remain visible underwater just off the coast. There are war memorials on the island to both the American and the Japanese dead. Peleliu and Angaur were the only islands in the Palau archipelago to be occupied by the Americans during the war. The capital of Koror remained in Japanese hands to the end of the war.

Peleliu was formally placed under the control of the United States under United Nations auspices in 1947 as part of the Trust Territory of the Pacific Islands. In 1947, two and a half years after Japanese surrender, there were over 30 Japanese still hiding in caves, believing the war was not over. The Americans sent a senior Japanese military official into the caves and convinced them to surrender. The last Japanese survivor, Keiji Nagai, died in 2019.

Palau became independent in 1978, and Peleliu was organized as a state within the new republic.

== Geography ==
Map of the state of Peleliu

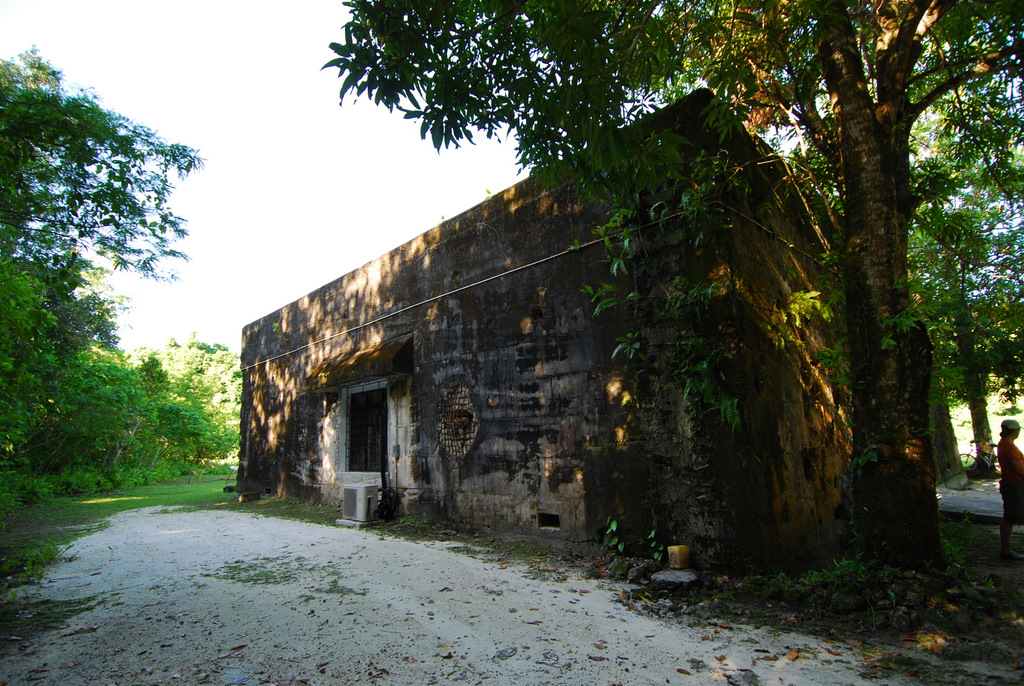
Former Peleliu World War II Memorial Museum

Peleliu is approximately 10 kilometres (5.4 nmi) northeast of the island of Angaur and 40 kilometres (22 nmi) southwest of the island of Koror. The state of Beliliou includes the islands of Beliliou, Ngedbus, Olngeuaol, Ngercheu, Belualasmau, Ruruid, Ngebad, Ngurungor, Ngesuall, and several islets. The total area for the state is approximately 19.52 km^{2} (7.54 sq mi). Beliliou Island, like Angaur, is a raised platform coralline island with an area of 16.98 km^{2} (6.56 sq mi). Located at the southern tip of the lagoon which encircles the main group of islands, Beliliou is surrounded by a thick fringe of mangrove forest comprising more than a quarter of its total area. On the island's west side is a steep spine named Bloody Nose Ridge during the Battle for Peleliu in World War II - rising to an elevation of 75 metres (246 ft). A second raised area, Rois ra Sang and Roischemiangel, rises to elevations of just over 50 m at the northern tip of the island. The rest of the island generally lies below 10 metres (33 ft) in elevation. Along this ridge, jagged spires of coralline limestone jut skyward in a tangled maze.

Much of Beliliou is covered by a limestone island forest with stands of Casuarina forest along sandy beach berms. With the exception of Ngercheu, the rest of the islands in the state are low, flat islands with large areas of sandy deposits covered by coconut or Casuarina forests. Ngercheu, located in the northern part of the state, has a typical rock island profile with steep cliffs of uplifted reef covered by a rock island forest.

The geography of Beliliou has been dramatically reshaped by the events of World War II. In preparation for the anticipated American invasion, the Japanese defenders transformed Beliliou into a defensive fortress. The build up, which was underway by 1943, began with the evacuation of Palauans from Beliliou to Babeldaob. As many as 10,000 Japanese defenders dug into the natural caves and fissures of the coralline limestone formations, reinforcing these positions with concrete bunkers. So well established were the Japanese defenders that they withstood a massive naval bombardment and met the American invasion force at nearly full strength on September 5, 1944. The Battle of Peleliu dragged on for weeks of bitter fighting at a terrible cost of lives.

Most of the land use in Beliliou today is for private gardens located in and around residential areas. There are no commercial enterprises active today, and municipal use is limited to a few small facilities. A large coconut plantation is on Ngedbus Island.

=== Climate ===
Climate data for Peleliu (1991–2020)
Month	Jan	Feb	Mar	Apr	May	Jun	Jul	Aug	Sep	Oct	Nov	Dec	Year
Mean daily maximum °F (°C)	84.1 (28.9)	83.4 (28.6)	84.7 (29.3)	85.9 (29.9)	86.1 (30.1)	85.1 (29.5)	84.7 (29.3)	85.6 (29.8)	85.9 (29.9)	86.0 (30.0)	86.3 (30.2)	85.1 (29.5)	85.2 (29.6)
Daily mean °F (°C)	80.9 (27.2)	80.1 (26.7)	81.1 (27.3)	82.2 (27.9)	82.5 (28.1)	81.6 (27.6)	81.3 (27.4)	82.2 (27.9)	82.3 (27.9)	82.1 (27.8)	82.4 (28.0)	81.5 (27.5)	81.7 (27.6)
Mean daily minimum °F (°C)	77.6 (25.3)	76.8 (24.9)	77.5 (25.3)	78.5 (25.8)	78.9 (26.1)	78.1 (25.6)	77.8 (25.4)	78.8 (26.0)	78.7 (25.9)	78.2 (25.7)	78.4 (25.8)	77.8 (25.4)	78.1 (25.6)
Average precipitation inches (mm)	9.68 (246)	8.97 (228)	6.76 (172)	6.25 (159)	10.71 (272)	13.96 (355)	11.91 (303)	10.15 (258)	8.04 (204)	8.85 (225)	8.73 (222)	12.73 (323)	116.74 (2,967)
Average snowfall inches (cm)	0.0 (0.0)	0.0 (0.0)	0.0 (0.0)	0.0 (0.0)	0.0 (0.0)	0.0 (0.0)	0.0 (0.0)	0.0 (0.0)	0.0 (0.0)	0.0 (0.0)	0.0 (0.0)	0.0 (0.0)	0 (0)
Source: NOAA

== Demography ==
The population of the state was 484 in the 2015 census and median age was 34.5 years. The official languages of the state are Palauan and English.

In June 1972, the resident population was 843. As of 2000, its population was about 571, making it the third most populous state of Palau. Most of the island's population lives in the village of Kloulklubed which is the state capital on the northwestern coast. Including the capital, there are a total of four villages:

- Kloulklubed (northwest)
- Imelechol (northeast)
- Lademisang (southernmost, in the central part of the island)
- Ongeuidel (northernmost)

Today, the major concentration of people live in Kloulklubed near the northern tip of the island.

=== Islands of the state ===
The state consists of the following islands:

Island	Area (km^{2})	Population (2000)	Coordinates
Peleliu	12.8	571	07°00′44.65″N 134°15′01.24″E
Ngercheu	0.93	0	07°05′33.51″N 134°16′41.12″E
Ngesebus	0.95	0	07°03′23.92″N 134°15′35.94″E
Ngurungor	0.54	0	07°01′16.39″N 134°16′20.731″E
Kongauru	0.34	0	07°03′47.92″N 134°16′26.14″E
Murphy Island	0.02	0	07°03′54.97″N 134°16′56.75″E

=== Phosphate ===
As at Angaur, phosphate mining in the Bloody Nose Ridge area of Beliliou began during the German administration and continued into the Japanese administration. The phosphate was loaded onto ships at a small harbor facility located at the northern tip of the island.

== Environment ==
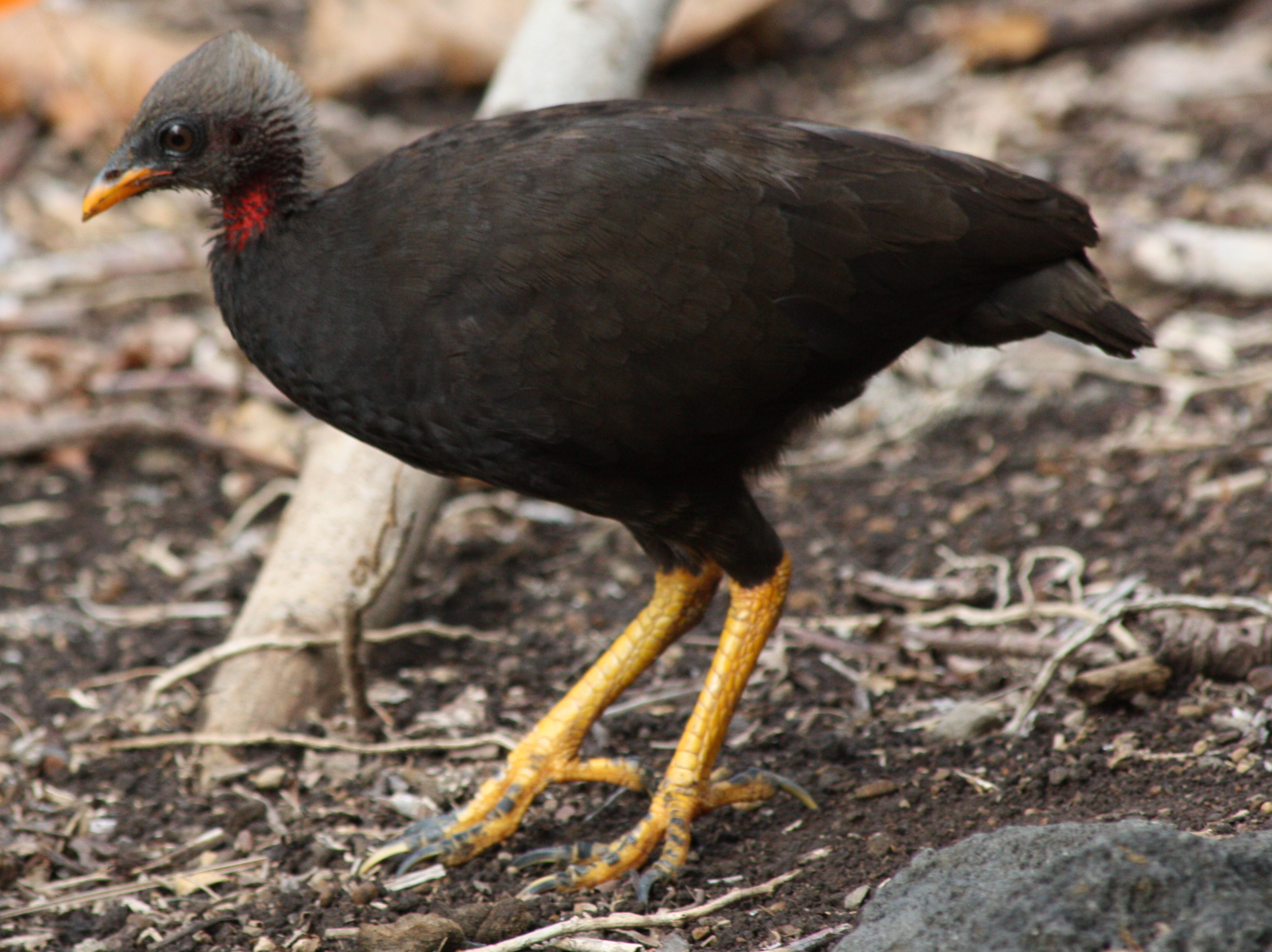
Both IBAs are important for Micronesian megapodes.

=== Important Bird Areas ===
The island has been designated an Important Bird Area (IBA) by BirdLife International because it supports populations of most of Palau's endemic birds, including Micronesian megapodes, Palau ground doves, Micronesian imperial pigeons, Palau fruit doves, swiftlets, owls and kingfishers, Micronesian myzomelas, morningbirds, Palau fantails, flycatchers and bush warblers, giant, dusky and citrine white-eyes, and Micronesian starlings.

The sandflats, mangroves, seagrass beds and islets just off the northern end of Peleliu provide feeding and roosting habitat for various wader species, as well as being home to megapodes. The site is an IBA for the megapodes, Far Eastern curlews, ruddy turnstones, great knots, red-necked stints, and grey-tailed tattlers.

== Political system ==
Peleliu has its own constitution, adopted in 1982. The state government was established in 1983. The state of Peleliu has an elected chief executive with a 3-year term length, known as the governor. The state also has a legislature elected every three years. The state population elects one of the members of the House of Delegates of Palau. Obak is the title of the traditional high chief from the state.

== Transport ==
Peleliu Airfield, created by the Japanese in World War II, has the longest and widest runway in Palau (1,850 metres (6,070 ft)), but was used only by small chartered aircraft after Palau's domestic flights were discontinued in late 2005. The landing strip was built during the Japanese era and originally consisted of a 6,600-foot runway oriented SW to NE with a smaller perpendicular runway intersecting the main run way about 2,200 feet from the SW. Additional taxiways connected the runways to airport facilities located to the north of the runways. The landing strips were unimproved, but still served for the daily flight from the Airai airport by a single engine plane. A third landing strip was built on Ngedbus Island, just north of Beliliou, during the Japanese administration. It was abandoned after the Battle of Peleliu and today is overgrown with a coconut plantation. In mid-2024, after months of work, United States Marine engineers reactivated the Peleliu airfield to enhance US military capability in the Pacific region.

A regular boat service connects the island twice a week to Koror and Angaur. Travel time by boat from Koror is over an hour. The small harbor in the far north of the island is shallow and suitable only for yachts with shallow draft.

The main road lies on the west side of Bloody Nose Ridge and extends from Kloulklubed to the landing strip. Secondary roads extend to all parts of the island.

== Peleliu Battlefield ==
- Peleliu Battlefield
- U.S. National Register of Historic Places
- U.S. National Historic Landmark
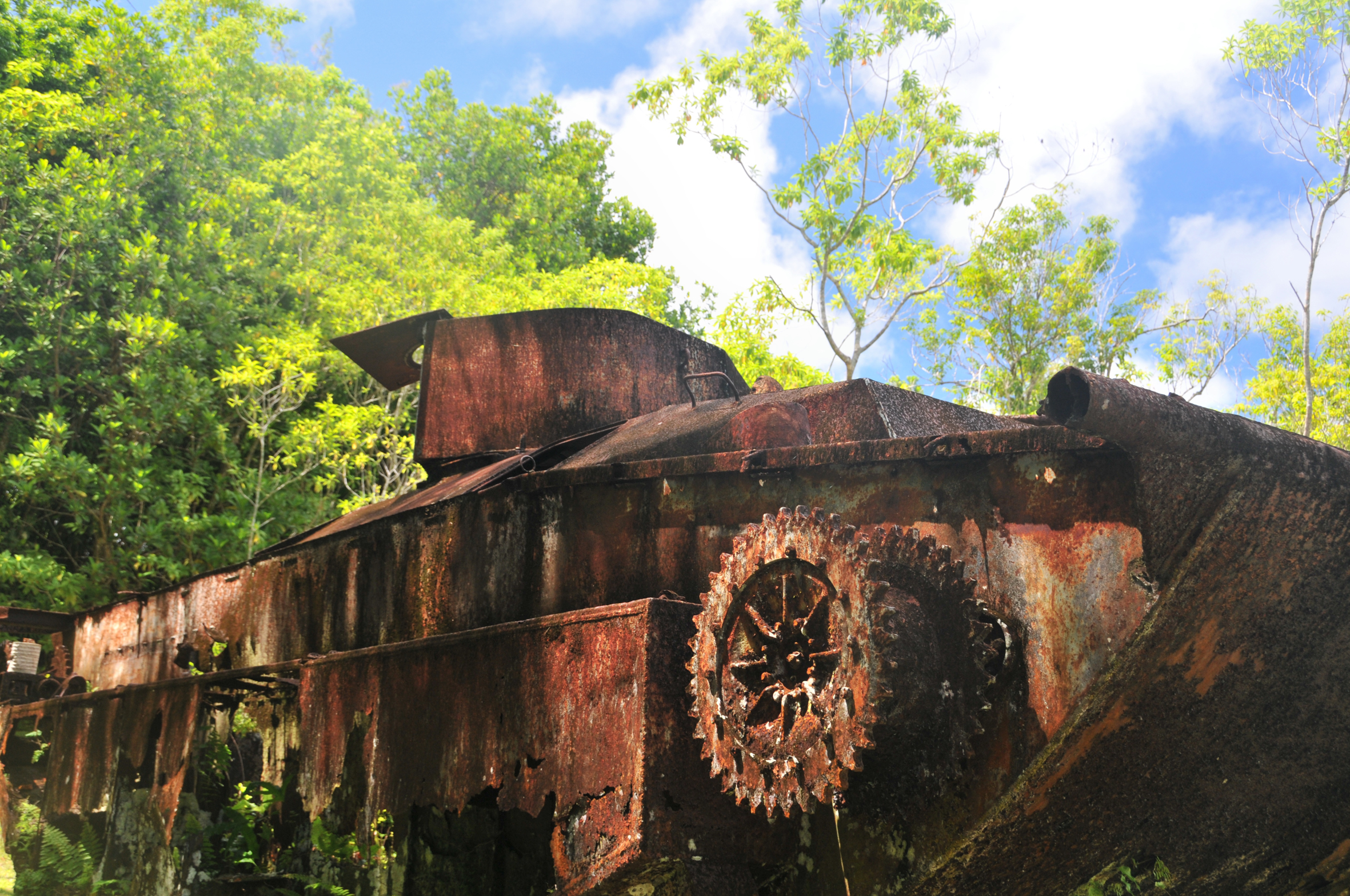
- Remains of an American LVT light amphibious tank
- Location: Peleliu, Palau
- Area: 7,680 acres (31.1 km^{2})
- Built: 1944
- NRHP reference No.: 85001754
- Added to NRHP: February 4, 1985

The entire island has been listed in the United States on the National Register of Historic Places as the Peleliu Battlefield, and has been designated a U.S. National Historic Landmark.

== Education ==
The Ministry of Education operates public schools.

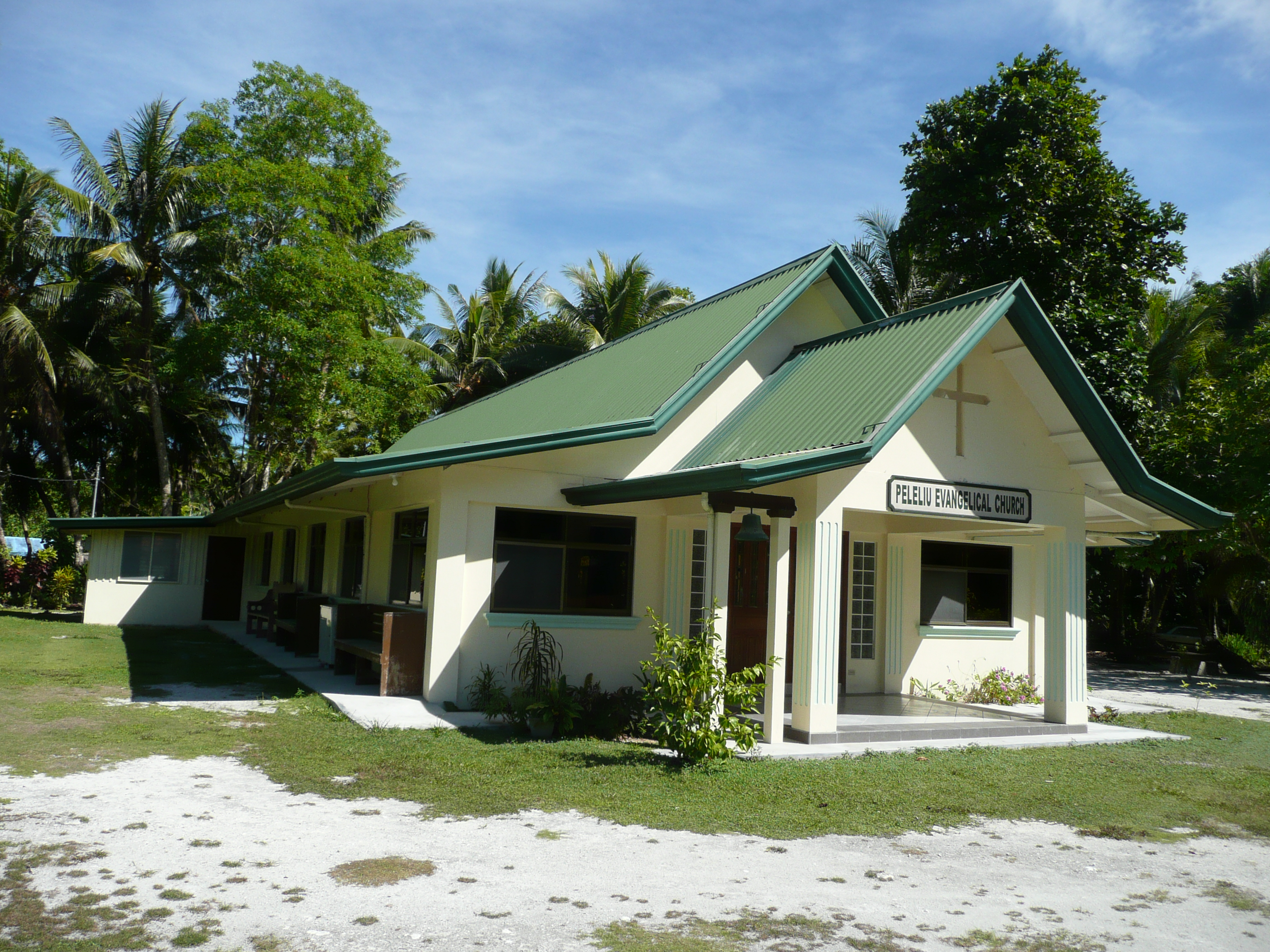
A church in the state of Peleliu

Peleliu Elementary School opened in 1946, and had its second building open in 1966, with the first still in use.

Palau High School in Koror is the country's only public high school, so children from this community go there.
