= List of states with limited recognition =

UN member states not recognised by at least one UN member state Non-UN member states recognised by at least one UN member state Non-UN member states recognised only by other non-UN member states

A number of polities have declared independence and sought diplomatic recognition from the international community as sovereign states, but have not been universally recognised as such. These entities often have de facto control of their territory. A number of such entities have existed in the past.

There are two traditional theories used to indicate how a sovereign state comes into being. The declarative theory (codified in the 1933 Montevideo Convention) defines a state as a person in international law if it meets the following criteria:

1. a defined territory
2. a permanent population
3. a government, and
4. a capacity to enter into relations with other states.

According to the declarative theory, an entity's statehood is independent of its recognition by other states. By contrast, the constitutive theory defines a state as a person of international law only if it is recognised as such by other states that are already a member of the international community.

Quasi-states often reference either or both doctrines in order to legitimise their claims to statehood. There are, for example, entities which meet the declarative criteria (with de facto partial or complete control over their claimed territory, a government and a permanent population), but whose statehood is not recognised by any other states. Non-recognition is often a result of conflicts with other countries that claim those entities as integral parts of their territory. In other cases, two or more partially recognised states may claim the same territorial area, with each of them de facto in control of a portion of it (for example, the Republic of China (Taiwan) and the People's Republic of China, or historically North Korea and South Korea). Entities that are recognised by only a minority of the world's states usually reference the declarative doctrine to legitimise their claims.

In many situations, international non-recognition is influenced by the presence of a foreign military force in the territory of the contested entity, making the description of the country's de facto status problematic. The international community can judge this military presence too intrusive, reducing the entity to a puppet state where effective sovereignty is retained by the foreign power. Historical cases in this sense can be seen in Japanese-led Manchukuo or the German-created Slovak Republic and Independent State of Croatia before and during World War II. In the 1996 case Loizidou v. Turkey, the European Court of Human Rights judged Turkey for having exercised authority in the territory of Northern Cyprus.

There are also entities that do not have control over any territory or do not unequivocally meet the declarative criteria for statehood but have been recognised to exist as sovereign entities by at least one other state. Historically, this has happened in the case of the Holy See (1870–1929); Estonia, Latvia, and Lithuania (during Soviet occupation); and Palestine at the time of its declaration of independence in 1988. The Sovereign Military Order of Malta is in this position. See list of governments in exile for unrecognised governments without control over the territory claimed.

== Criteria ==
State practice relating to the recognition of a country typically falls somewhere between the declarative theory and constitutive theory approaches.

The criteria for inclusion on this list are limited to polities that claim sovereignty, lack recognition from at least one UN member state, and either:

- satisfy the declarative theory of statehood, or
- are recognised (constitutive theory) as a state by at least one UN member state.

== Background ==
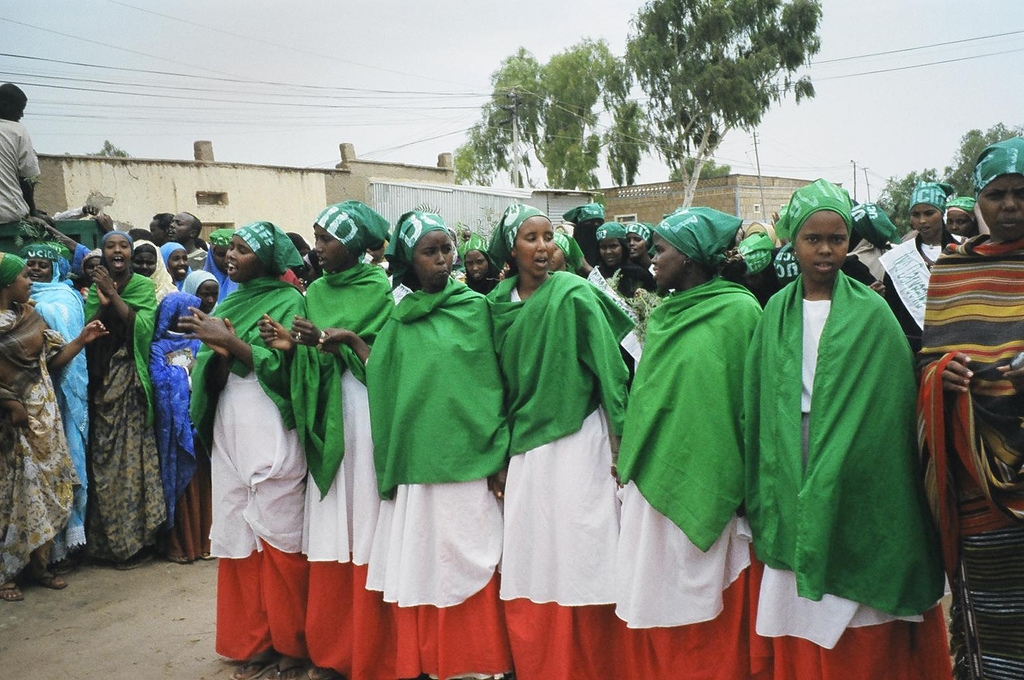
Women in Somaliland wearing the colors of the Somaliland flag

There are 193 United Nations (UN) member states, while both the Holy See and Palestine have observer state status in the United Nations. However, some countries that fulfill the declarative criteria, are recognised by the large majority of other states and are members of the United Nations are still included in the list here because one or more other states do not recognise their statehood, due to territorial claims or other conflicts.

Some states maintain informal (officially non-diplomatic) relations with states that do not officially recognise them. Taiwan (the Republic of China) is one such state, as it maintains unofficial relations with many other states through its Economic and Cultural Offices, which allow regular consular services. This allows Taiwan to have economic relations even with states that do not formally recognise it. A total of 56 states, including Germany, Italy, the United States, and the United Kingdom, maintain some form of unofficial mission in Taiwan. Kosovo, Northern Cyprus, Abkhazia, Transnistria, the Sahrawi Republic, Somaliland, and Palestine also host informal diplomatic missions, or maintain special delegations or other informal missions abroad.

== United Nations member and observer states ==
UN member states not recognised by at least one UN member state
Name	Declared	Status	Other claimants	Further information
Cyprus	1960	The Republic of Cyprus, independent since 1960, is not recognised by one UN member (Turkey) and one non-UN member (Northern Cyprus), due to the ongoing civil dispute over the island. Turkey does not accept the Republic's rule over the whole island and refers to it as the "Greek Administration of Southern Cyprus".	Northern Cyprus claims the northeastern portion of the island of Cyprus.	Foreign relations, missions (of, to)
Israel	1948	Israel, founded in 1948, is not recognised by 23 UN members, mostly Arab and Muslim countries. The majority of these states view the State of Palestine as the sole legitimate government of the historic Palestinian territory. The Palestine Liberation Organization (PLO), which enjoys majority international recognition as sole representative of the Palestinian people, recognised Israel in 1993. In January 2018 and October 2018, the Palestinian Central Council voted to suspend recognition of Israel, but this position has yet to be acted upon by Palestinian President Mahmoud Abbas.	Palestine considers itself to be the legitimate government of the West Bank, which is regarded by the United Nations and many legal scholars as being under Israeli occupation, and of the Gaza Strip, whose status is disputed following Israel's 2005 withdrawal, with some legal scholars arguing that occupation persists due to Israel's control over borders, airspace, and maritime access, while others contend that it does not meet the classical definition of occupation. Syria considers itself to be the legitimate government of the Golan Heights, a territory occupied and later annexed by Israel, an action recognised by the United States and, since 10 August 2026, Colombia. Lebanon considers itself to be the legitimate government of the Shebaa Farms, a territory controlled by Israel and claimed by Lebanon, though its status is disputed internationally.	Foreign relations, missions (of, to) International recognition
North Korea (DPRK)	1948	North Korea (officially the Democratic People's Republic of Korea), independent since 1948, is not recognised by two UN members, South Korea and Japan. (Note: While Japan has signed Japan–North Korea Pyongyang Declaration that was referred Japan and North Korea as "two countries", and described as an "important political document" by Junichiro Koizumi, Japanese prime minister at the time, Koizumi stated that Japan do not recognise North Korea even when they signed the declaration.)	South Korea considers itself to be the sole legitimate government of Korea, and claims all territory controlled by North Korea.	Foreign relations, missions (of, to)

UN General Assembly observer states not recognised by at least one UN member state
Name	Declared	Status	Other claimants	Further information
Palestine	1988	Israel took control of the West Bank and Gaza Strip, which were controlled by Jordan and Egypt respectively and are internationally recognised as occupied Palestinian territories as a result of the Six-Day War in 1967, but with the exception of East Jerusalem, has never formally annexed them. The State of Palestine (commonly known as Palestine) was declared in 1988 by the Palestine Liberation Organization (PLO), which is recognised by a majority of UN member states and the UN itself as the sole representative of the Palestinian people. Since the end of the first Palestinian Intifada against Israel the Israeli government has gradually moved its armed forces and settlers out of certain parts of Palestine's claimed territory, while still maintaining varying degrees of control over most of it. The Palestinian National Authority (PNA), which performs limited internal government functions over certain areas of Palestine, was established in 1994. The 2007 split between the Fatah and Hamas political parties resulted in competing governments claiming to represent the PNA and Palestine, with Fatah exercising authority exclusively over the West Bank and enjoying majority recognition from UN member states, and a separate Hamas leadership exercising authority exclusively over the Gaza area (except for a short period from 2014 to 2016). (Note: Israel allows the PNA to execute some functions in the Palestinian territories, depending on special area classification. Israel maintains minimal interference (retaining control of borders: air, sea beyond internal waters, land) in the Gaza Strip (its interior and Egypt portion of the land border are under Hamas control), maximum in "Area C" and varying degrees of interference elsewhere. See also Israeli-occupied territories.) Palestine is officially recognised as a state by 157 UN member states, the Holy See, and the Sahrawi Arab Democratic Republic. The remaining UN member states, including Israel, do not recognise the State of Palestine. The United Nations designates the claimed Palestinian territories as "occupied" by Israel, and accorded Palestine non-member observer state status in 2012 (see United Nations General Assembly resolution 67/19). Palestine also has membership in the Arab League, the Organisation of Islamic Cooperation and UNESCO.	Israel regards the area claimed by Palestine as "disputed" territory (that is, territory not legally belonging to any state).	Foreign relations, missions (of, to) International recognition, Israeli–Palestinian peace process, History of the State of Palestine

== United Nations non-member states ==
UN specialised agency member states not recognised by at least one UN member state
Name	Declared	Status	Other claimants	Further information
Cook Islands	1965	The Cook Islands became a state in free association with New Zealand in 1965. Although the Cook Islands are fully self-governing and behave as a sovereign state in international law, their constitutional status is different from that of a fully independent state, considering that all Cook Islands nationals are New Zealand citizens, and the country's head of state is the Monarch of New Zealand. As of 2015, the Cook Islands had established diplomatic relations with 43 states, while the number as of May 2025 is at least 65 UN member states, as well as the Holy See, Kosovo, Niue and the European Union. Some countries establishing diplomatic relations, such as the United States, have recognised the Cook Islands as a fully sovereign state, while some, such as France, have not. The Cook Islands are a member of nine United Nations specialised agencies, and the United Nations classifies the Cook Islands as a "non-member state", a category unique only to it and Niue.	State in free association with New Zealand.	Foreign relations, missions (of, to) Political status
Kosovo	2008	Kosovo declared its independence in 2008. It is recognised by 110 UN members, Taiwan, the Cook Islands and Niue. 8 other UN members have recognised Kosovo and subsequently withdrawn recognition. The United Nations, as stipulated in Security Council Resolution 1244, has administered the territory since 1999 through the United Nations Interim Administration Mission in Kosovo, with cooperation from the European Union since 2008. Kosovo is a member of two United Nations specialised agencies (the International Monetary Fund and the World Bank Group), as well as the Venice Commission, European Bank for Reconstruction and Development, and the International Olympic Committee, among others.	Serbia claims Kosovo as part of its sovereign territory.	Foreign relations, missions (of, to) International recognition; Political status
Niue	1974	Niue became a state in free association with New Zealand in 1974 after a constitutional referendum. Although Niue is fully self-governing and behaves as a sovereign state in international law, its constitutional status is different from that of a fully independent state, considering that all Niue nationals are New Zealand citizens, and the country's head of state is the Monarch of New Zealand. As of August 2024, Niue has established diplomatic relations with at least 28 UN member states, as well as the Cook Islands, Kosovo, and the European Union. Niue is a member of eight United Nations specialised agencies, and the United Nations classifies Niue as a "non-member state", a category unique only to it and the Cook Islands.	State in free association with New Zealand.	Foreign relations, missions (of, to) Political status

Non-UN member states recognised by at least one UN member state
Name	Declared	Status	Other claimants	Further information
Abkhazia	1999	Abkhazia declared its independence in 1999. It is recognised by 4 UN member states (Russia, Syria, Nicaragua, and Venezuela), and two non-UN member states (South Ossetia and Transnistria). Three additional UN member states (Tuvalu, Vanuatu, and Nauru) had recognised Abkhazia, but subsequently withdrew their recognition.	Georgia claims Abkhazia as part of its sovereign territory.	Foreign relations, missions (of, to) International recognition
Northern Cyprus (TRNC)	1983	Northern Cyprus declared its independence in 1983 with its official name being the "Turkish Republic of Northern Cyprus" (TRNC). It is recognised by one UN member, Turkey. The Organisation of Islamic Cooperation, and the Economic Cooperation Organization have granted Northern Cyprus observer status under the name "Turkish Cypriot State". United Nations Security Council Resolution 541 defines the declaration of independence of Northern Cyprus as legally invalid. The International Court of Justice stated in its advisory opinion on Kosovo's declaration of independence in 2010 that "the Security Council in an exceptional character attached illegality to the DOI of TRNC because it was, or would have been connected with the unlawful use of force".	Cyprus claims the TRNC as part of its sovereign territory.	Foreign relations, missions (of, to) Cyprus dispute
Sahrawi Arab Democratic Republic (SADR)	1976	Morocco invaded and annexed most of Western Sahara, forcing Spain to withdraw from the territory in 1975. In 1976, the Polisario Front declared the independence of Western Sahara as the Sahrawi Arab Democratic Republic (SADR). The SADR is largely a government in exile located in Algeria, which claims the entire territory of Western Sahara, but controls only a small fraction of it. The SADR is recognised by 46 UN member states and South Ossetia. 38 other UN member states have recognised the SADR but subsequently retracted or suspended recognition, pending the outcome of a referendum on self-determination. The remaining UN member states, including Morocco, have never recognised the SADR. The SADR is a member of the African Union. United Nations General Assembly Resolution 34/37 recognised the right of the Western Sahara people to self-determination and recognised also the Polisario Front as the representative of the Western Sahara people. Western Sahara is listed on the United Nations list of non-self-governing territories. The Arab League and 9 UN member states officially recognise Morocco's annexation of Western Sahara, while the European Union and 25 UN member states support the Moroccan autonomy plan.	Morocco claims Western Sahara (including the area controlled by the SADR) as part of its sovereign territory.	Foreign relations, missions (of, to) International recognition; Political status
Somaliland	1991	Somaliland declared its independence in 1991 claiming to be the legal successor to the State of Somaliland, a short lived independent sovereign state that existed from 26 June 1960 (when the British Somaliland Protectorate gained full independence from the United Kingdom) to 1 July 1960 (when the State of Somaliland united with Somalia to form the Somali Republic). It is officially recognised by one UN member, Israel, and maintains unofficial relations with several UN member states and the Republic of China (Taiwan). Taiwan and Somaliland have mutual representative offices in each other's countries, similarly to how Taiwan conducts relations with other countries that do not recognise it.	Somalia claims Somaliland as a federal state within the country.	Foreign relations, missions (of, to) International recognition
South Ossetia	1992	South Ossetia declared its independence in 1992. It is recognised by 4 UN member states (Russia, Syria, Nicaragua, and Venezuela), and two non-UN member states (Abkhazia and Transnistria). Two UN member states (Tuvalu and Nauru) had recognised South Ossetia, but subsequently withdrew recognition.	Georgia claims South Ossetia as part of its sovereign territory.	Foreign relations, missions (of, to) International recognition
Taiwan (ROC)	1912/1949	Taiwan (formally known as the Republic of China), enjoyed majority recognition as the sole government of China until roughly the late 1950s/1960s, when a majority of UN member states started to gradually switch recognition to the People's Republic of China (PRC). The United Nations itself recognised the ROC as the sole representative of China until 1971, when it decided to give this recognition to the PRC instead (see United Nations General Assembly Resolution 2758). The ROC and PRC do not recognise each other's statehood, and the PRC enforces the one China principle meaning that no state can recognise both of them at the same time. The ROC is recognised by 11 UN members and the Holy See. All remaining UN member states, as well as the Cook Islands and Niue, recognise the PRC instead of the ROC and either accept the PRC's territorial claim over Taiwan or take a non-committal position on Taiwan's status. A significant number of PRC-recognising UN member states, as well as the Republic of Somaliland, nonetheless conduct officially non-diplomatic relations with the ROC, designating it as either "Taipei" or "Taiwan". Since the early 1990s, the ROC has sought separate United Nations membership under a variety of names, including "Taiwan".	The People's Republic of China considers itself to be the sole legitimate government of all of China, and therefore claims exclusive sovereignty over all territory controlled by Taiwan. See also: One China.	Foreign relations, missions (of, to) International recognition, Political status

Non-UN member states recognised only by other non-UN member states
Name	Declared	Status	Other claimants	Further information
Transnistria (PMR)	1991	Transnistria (officially the Pridnestrovian Moldavian Republic) declared its independence in 1991. It is recognised by two non-UN members: Abkhazia and South Ossetia.	Moldova claims Transnistria as part of its sovereign territory.	Foreign relations, missions (of, to) International recognition, Political status

== Excluded entities ==
The following entities are excluded from the list:

- The Sovereign Military Order of Malta (SMOM) is considered a sovereign non-state entity, as it claims neither statehood nor territory. It has established diplomatic relations with 114 UN member states, the Holy See, Palestine and the European Union as a sovereign subject of international law. Additionally, it participates in the United Nations as a permanent observer entity, the same status granted to organizations such as the International Olympic Committee.
- Subnational entities and regions that function as de facto independent states, with the central government exercising little or no control over their territory, but that do not explicitly claim to be independent. Examples include the Gaza Strip in Palestine, the Kurdistan Region in Iraq, Puntland in Somalia, and the Wa State in Myanmar.
- Rebel groups that have declared independence and exert some control over territory, but that reliable sources do not describe as meeting the threshold of a sovereign state under international law. Examples include Ambazonia and the Islamic State; see list of rebel groups that control territory for a more complete list of such groups.
- Those areas undergoing civil wars and other disputes over government succession (such as rival governments), regardless of temporary alignment with the inclusion criteria (e.g. by receiving recognition as a state or legitimate government), where the conflict is still in its active phase, the situation is too rapidly changing and no relatively stable quasi-states have emerged yet.
- Those of the irredentist movements and governments in exile that do not satisfy the inclusion criteria by simultaneously not satisfying the declarative theory and not having been recognised as a state or legitimate government by any other state.
- Entities considered to be micronations, even if they are recognised by another micronation. Even though micronations generally claim to be sovereign and independent, it is often debatable whether a micronation truly controls its claimed territory. (Note: It is far from certain that micronations, which are generally of minuscule size, have sovereign control over their claimed territories, contrasted with the mere disregard and indifference toward micronations' assertions by the states from which they allege to have seceded. By not deeming such declarations (and other acts of the micronation) important enough to react in any way, these states generally consider micronations to be private property and their claims as unofficial private announcements of individuals, who remain subject to the laws of the states in which their properties are located.) For this reason, micronations are usually not considered of geopolitical relevance. For a list of micronations, see list of micronations.
- Uncontacted peoples who live in societies that cannot be defined as states or whose statuses as such are not definitively known.
- Some states can be slow to establish relations with new UN member states and thus do not explicitly recognise them, despite having no dispute and sometimes favorable relations. These are excluded from the list. Examples include Croatia and Montenegro.
- The Joseon Cybernation, a "cyber state" proclaimed by entrepreneur Andrew Lee that claims no territory, was given recognition by UN member state Antigua and Barbuda in 2023. "Cyber states" do not meet the criteria for statehood and international law has no mechanism for recognising them.

== See also ==
- Community for Democracy and Rights of Nations
- Decolonisation
- Diplomatic recognition
- List of historical unrecognised states
- Quasi-state
- Separatism
  - List of active autonomist and secessionist movements
    - List of active national liberation movements recognised by intergovernmental organisations
- Territorial dispute
  - List of territorial disputes
- Territorial integrity
- Unilateral declaration of independence
- Unrepresented Nations and Peoples Organization
