= List of sovereign states =

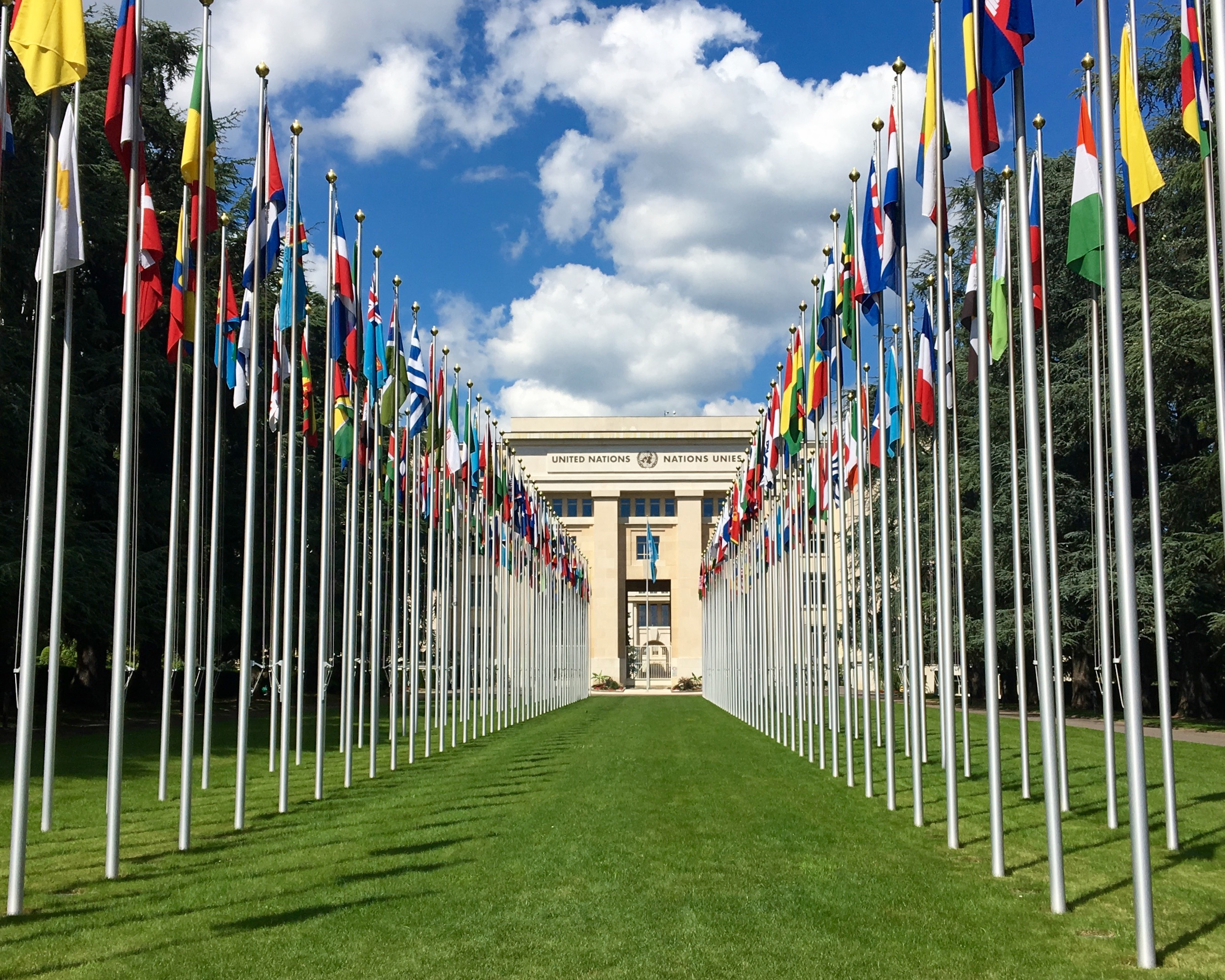
Flags of the 193 United Nations member and 2 non-member GA observer states in front of the Palace of Nations in Geneva, Switzerland

The following is a list providing an overview of sovereign states around the world with information on their status and recognition of their sovereignty.

The 205 listed states can be divided into three categories based on membership within the United Nations System: 193 UN member states, two UN General Assembly non-member observer states, and ten other states. The sovereignty dispute column indicates states having undisputed sovereignty (190 states, of which there are 189 UN member states and one UN General Assembly non-member observer state), states having disputed sovereignty (13 states, of which there are four UN member states, one UN General Assembly non-member observer state, and eight de facto states), and states having a special political status (two states, both in free association with New Zealand).

Compiling a list such as this can be complicated and controversial, as there is no definition that is binding on all the members of the community of nations concerning the criteria for statehood. For more information on the criteria used to determine the contents of this list, please see the criteria for inclusion section below. The list is intended to include entities that have been recognised as having de facto status as sovereign states, and inclusion should not be seen as an endorsement of any specific claim to statehood in legal terms.

== Criteria for inclusion ==
The dominant customary international law standard of statehood is the declarative theory of statehood, which was codified by the Montevideo Convention of 1933. The Convention defines the state as a person of international law if it "possess[es] the following qualifications: (a) a permanent population; (b) a defined territory; (c) government; and (d) a capacity to enter into relations with the other states". Article 11 separately requires the contracting states not to recognise territorial acquisitions or special advantages obtained by force.

Debate exists on the degree to which recognition should be included as a criterion of statehood. The declarative theory of statehood argues that statehood is purely objective and recognition of a state by other states is irrelevant. On the other end of the spectrum, the constitutive theory of statehood defines a state as a person under international law only if it is recognised as sovereign by other states. For the purposes of this list, included are all polities that consider themselves sovereign states (through a declaration of independence or some other means) and either:

- are often regarded as satisfying the declarative theory of statehood, or
- are recognised as a sovereign state by at least one UN member state

In some cases, there is a divergence of opinion over the interpretation of the first point, and whether an entity satisfies it is disputed. Unique political entities which fail to meet the classification of a sovereign state are considered proto-states.

On the basis of the above criteria, this list includes the following 205 entities: (Note: The following bullets are grouped according to the availability of sources for the two criteria ((a) or (b)). This arrangement is not intended to reflect the relative importance of the two theories. Additional details are discussed in the states' individual entries.) (Note: The Sovereign Military Order of Malta is not included, as despite being a sovereign entity it lacks territory and does not claim statehood. Entities considered to be micronations are not included. It is often up to debate whether a micronation truly controls its claimed territory. The Joseon Cybernation, a self-proclaimed digital nation which claims no territory is also not included, though it was given recognition by UN member state Antigua and Barbuda in 2023. International law does not have a mechanism for recognising states "in cyberspace". Also omitted from this list are all uncontacted peoples, either who live in societies that cannot be defined as states or whose statuses as such are not definitively known.)

- 204 states recognised by at least one UN member state
- One state (Transnistria) that satisfies the declarative theory of statehood and is recognised only by non-UN member states

The table includes bullets in the right-hand column representing entities that are either not sovereign states or have a close association to another sovereign state. It also includes subnational areas where the sovereignty of the titular state is limited by an international agreement. Taken together, these include:

- Entities that are in a free association relationship with another state
- Two Pakistan-administered territories in the disputed region of Kashmir: Azad Kashmir and Gilgit-Baltistan
- Dependent territories of another state, as well as areas that exhibit many characteristics of dependent territories according to the dependent territory page
- Subnational entities created by international agreements

== List of states ==
=== UN member states and General Assembly observer states ===
Membership within the UN System
UN member state
UN General Assembly observer state

Sovereignty dispute
Undisputed sovereignty
Disputed sovereignty

	Short name or formal name (Note: Common name in bold.)	Membership within the UN System (Note: This column indicates whether or not a state is a member of the United Nations. It also indicates which non-member states participate in the United Nations System through membership in the International Atomic Energy Agency or one of the specialised agencies of the United Nations. All United Nations members belong to at least one specialised agency and are parties to the statute of the International Court of Justice.)	Sovereignty dispute (Note: This column indicates whether or not a state is the subject of a major sovereignty dispute. Only states whose entire sovereignty is disputed by another state are listed.)	Further information on status and recognition of sovereignty (Note: Information is included on: The extent to which a state's sovereignty is recognised internationally. More information can be found at List of states with limited recognition, Membership in the European Union, (Note: The member states of the European Union have transferred part of their sovereignty in the form of legislative, executive, and judicial powers to the institutions of the EU, which is an example of supranational union. The EU has 27 member states.) where applicable, Any dependencies, if applicable, which are generally not part of the territory of the sovereign state, federal structure of the state, where applicable. More information can be found at Federated state, Any autonomous areas inside the territory of the sovereign state, Any situations where one person is the Head of State of more than one state, Any governments-in-exile recognised by at least one state.)
A	Afghanistan – Islamic Emirate of Afghanistan	UN member state	None	The ruling Islamic Emirate of Afghanistan, in power since 2021, has not been recognised by any state except Russia. In 2022, the United Nations removed former president Ashraf Ghani and former foreign minister Haneef Atmar from its protocol lists, while retaining Naseer Faiq as Afghanistan's chargé d'affaires. Faiq continued to represent Afghanistan at the United Nations in 2026. Most countries still recognise the Islamic Republic.
A	Albania – Republic of Albania	UN member state	None	
A	Algeria – People's Democratic Republic of Algeria	UN member state	None	
A	Andorra – Principality of Andorra	UN member state	None	Andorra is a co-principality in which the office of head of state is jointly held ex officio by the French president and the bishop of the Roman Catholic diocese of Urgell, who himself is appointed by the Pope.
A	Angola – Republic of Angola	UN member state	None	
A	Antigua and Barbuda	UN member state	None	Antigua and Barbuda is a Commonwealth realm (Note: Commonwealth realm refers to any member state of the Commonwealth of Nations whose head of state is King Charles III. Each realm is separate, independent, and a sovereign state; see Commonwealth realm interrelationship.) with one autonomous region, Barbuda. (Note: For more information on divisions with a high degree of autonomy, see List of autonomous areas by country.)
A	Argentina – Argentine Republic (Note: The Argentine Constitution (Art. 35) recognises the following denominations for Argentina: "United Provinces of the Río de la Plata", "Argentine Republic" and "Argentine Confederation"; furthermore, it establishes the usage of "Argentine Nation" for purposes of legislation.)	UN member state	None	Argentina is a federation of 23 provinces and one autonomous city. (Note: More information on more or less federal structures can be found at Federal governments.) (Note: Argentina's claimed Antarctic territory of Argentine Antarctica (Antártida Argentina) is one of five constituent departments of the province Tierra del Fuego.)
A	Armenia – Republic of Armenia	UN member state	None	
A	Australia – Commonwealth of Australia	UN member state	None	Australia is a Commonwealth realm and a federation of both states and territories. There are six states, three internal territories, six external territories and one claimed Antarctic external territory. The external territories of Australia are: Ashmore and Cartier Islands; Christmas Island; Cocos (Keeling) Islands; Coral Sea Islands Territory; Heard Island and McDonald Islands; Norfolk Island; Australian Antarctic Territory
A	Austria – Republic of Austria	UN member state	None	Member of the European Union (EU). Austria is a federation of nine states.
A	Azerbaijan – Republic of Azerbaijan	UN member state	None	Azerbaijan contains one autonomous region, Nakhchivan.
B	Bahamas, The – Commonwealth of The Bahamas	UN member state	None	The Bahamas is a Commonwealth realm.
B	Bahrain – Kingdom of Bahrain	UN member state	None	
B	Bangladesh – People's Republic of Bangladesh	UN member state	None	
B	Barbados	UN member state	None	
B	Belarus – Republic of Belarus	UN member state	None	Many states rescinded their recognition of President Alexander Lukashenko following the disputed 2020 election. Lithuania currently recognises Sviatlana Tsikhanouskaya's Coordination Council as the legitimate government of Belarus.
B	Belgium – Kingdom of Belgium	UN member state	None	Member of the EU. Belgium is a federation of three linguistic communities and three regions.
B	Belize	UN member state	None	Belize is a Commonwealth realm.
B	Benin – Republic of Benin	UN member state	None	
B	Bhutan – Kingdom of Bhutan	UN member state	None	
B	Bolivia – Plurinational State of Bolivia	UN member state	None	
B	Bosnia and Herzegovina	UN member state	None	Bosnia and Herzegovina has two constituent entities: Federation of Bosnia and Herzegovina; Republika Srpska; and Brčko District, a self-governing administrative district.
B	Botswana – Republic of Botswana	UN member state	None	
B	Brazil – Federative Republic of Brazil	UN member state	None	Brazil is a federation of 26 states and one federal district.
B	Brunei – Brunei Darussalam	UN member state	None	
B	Bulgaria – Republic of Bulgaria	UN member state	None	Member of the EU.
B	Burkina Faso	UN member state	None	
B	Burundi – Republic of Burundi	UN member state	None	
C	Cambodia – Kingdom of Cambodia	UN member state	None	
C	Cameroon – Republic of Cameroon	UN member state	None	
C	Canada (Note: The legal name for Canada is the sole word; an officially sanctioned, though disused, name is the "Dominion of Canada" (which includes its legal title); see: Use of Dominion, Dominion#Canada.)	UN member state	None	Canada is a Commonwealth realm and a federation of 10 provinces and three territories.
C	Cape Verde – Republic of Cabo Verde (Note: The government of Cape Verde declared "Cabo Verde" to be the official English name of the country in 2013.)	UN member state	None	
C	Central African Republic	UN member state	None	
C	Chad – Republic of Chad	UN member state	None	
C	Chile – Republic of Chile	UN member state	None	Chile has two special territories, Easter Island and Juan Fernández Islands. (Note: Chile's claimed Antarctic territory of the Chilean Antarctic (Antártica Chilena) is a commune of the Antártica Chilena Province of the Magallanes Region.)
C	China – People's Republic of China (Note: The People's Republic of China (PRC) is commonly referred to as "China", while the Republic of China (ROC) is commonly referred to as "Taiwan". The ROC is also occasionally known diplomatically as Chinese Taipei, or by other alternative names.)	UN member state	Partially unrecognised. Claimed by the Republic of China.	China contains five autonomous regions, Guangxi, Inner Mongolia, Ningxia, Tibet, and Xinjiang. Additionally, it has sovereignty over two Special Administrative Regions: Hong Kong; Macau; China claims, but does not control, Taiwan, which is governed by a rival administration (the Republic of China) that claims all of China as its territory. (Note: In 1949, the Republic of China government led by the Kuomintang (KMT) lost the Chinese Civil War to the Chinese Communist Party (CCP) and set up a provisional capital in Taipei. The CCP established the PRC. As such, the political status of the ROC and legal status of Taiwan (alongside the territories under ROC jurisdiction) are in dispute. In 1971, the United Nations gave the China seat to the PRC. In the view of the United Nations, no member of the organisation withdrew as a consequence of this, but the ROC representatives declared that they were withdrawing. Most states recognise the PRC to be the sole legitimate representative of all China, and the UN classifies Taiwan as "Taiwan, Province of China". The ROC has de facto relations with most sovereign states. A significant political movement within Taiwan advocates Taiwan independence.) China is not recognised by 11 UN member states and Vatican City, which all recognise the Republic of China (Taiwan) instead. (Note: See also Dates of establishment of diplomatic relations with the People's Republic of China and Foreign relations of China.)
C	Colombia – Republic of Colombia	UN member state	None	
C	Comoros – Union of the Comoros	UN member state	None	Comoros comprises three islands and is a unitary republic under its 2018 constitution.
C	Congo, Democratic Republic of the (Note: Also known as "Congo-Kinshasa". Formerly referred to as "Zaire", its official name from 1971 to 1997.)	UN member state	None	
C	Congo, Republic of the (Note: Also known as "Congo-Brazzaville" or the "Congo Republic".)	UN member state	None	
C	Costa Rica – Republic of Costa Rica	UN member state	None	
C	Croatia – Republic of Croatia	UN member state	None	Member of the EU.
C	Cuba – Republic of Cuba	UN member state	None	
C	Cyprus – Republic of Cyprus	UN member state	Not recognised by Turkey.	Member of the EU. The northeastern part of the island is the de facto state of Northern Cyprus. Cyprus is not recognised by Turkey due to the Cyprus problem, with Turkey recognising Northern Cyprus.
C	Czech Republic (Note: "Czechia" is the official short name in English adopted by the Czech government. This variant remains relatively uncommon, but has been adopted by several companies and organisations including the United Nations. See: Name of the Czech Republic.)	UN member state	None	Member of the EU.
D	Denmark – Kingdom of Denmark	UN member state	None	Member of the EU. The Kingdom of Denmark includes two self-governing territories: Faroe Islands; Greenland; The metropolitan territory of Denmark, the Faroe Islands and Greenland form the three constituent countries of the Kingdom. (Note: The designation "Denmark" can refer either to Metropolitan Denmark or to the entire Danish Realm (e.g. in international organisations).) The Kingdom of Denmark as a whole is a member of the EU, but EU law (in most cases) does not apply to the Faroe Islands and Greenland. See Greenland and the European Union, and Faroe Islands and the European Union.
D	Djibouti – Republic of Djibouti	UN member state	None	
D	Dominica – Commonwealth of Dominica	UN member state	None	
D	Dominican Republic	UN member state	None	
E	Ecuador – Republic of Ecuador	UN member state	None	
E	Egypt – Arab Republic of Egypt	UN member state	None	
E	El Salvador – Republic of El Salvador	UN member state	None	
E	Equatorial Guinea – Republic of Equatorial Guinea	UN member state	None	
E	Eritrea – State of Eritrea	UN member state	None	
E	Estonia – Republic of Estonia	UN member state	None	Member of the EU.
E	Eswatini – Kingdom of Eswatini (Note: Formerly referred to as the Kingdom of Swaziland, its official name until 2018.)	UN member state	None	
E	Ethiopia – Federal Democratic Republic of Ethiopia	UN member state	None	Ethiopia is a federation of 12 regions and two chartered cities.
F	Fiji – Republic of Fiji	UN member state	None	Fiji contains one autonomous region, Rotuma.
F	Finland – Republic of Finland	UN member state	None	Member of the EU.: Åland is a neutral and demilitarised autonomous region of Finland. (Note: Åland was demilitarised by the Treaty of Paris in 1856, which was later affirmed by the League of Nations in 1921, and in a somewhat different context reaffirmed in the treaty on Finland's admission to the European Union in 1995.)
F	France – French Republic	UN member state	None	Member of the EU. France contains five overseas regions/departments; French Guiana, Guadeloupe, Martinique, Mayotte, and Réunion. France also includes eight overseas territories: Clipperton Island; French Polynesia; New Caledonia; Saint Barthélemy; Saint Martin; Saint Pierre and Miquelon; Wallis and Futuna; French Southern and Antarctic Lands (Note: France's claimed Antarctic territory of Adélie Land (Terre Adélie) is one of five constituent districts of the French Southern and Antarctic Lands.)
G	Gabon – Gabonese Republic	UN member state	None	
G	Gambia, The – Republic of The Gambia	UN member state	None	
G	Georgia	UN member state	None	Georgia contains two autonomous republics, Adjara and Abkhazia. In Abkhazia and South Ossetia, de facto states have been formed.
G	Germany – Federal Republic of Germany	UN member state	None	Member of the EU. Germany is a federation of 16 states.
G	Ghana – Republic of Ghana	UN member state	None	
G	Greece – Hellenic Republic	UN member state	None	Member of the EU. Greece contains one autonomous area, Mount Athos.
G	Grenada	UN member state	None	Grenada is a Commonwealth realm.
G	Guatemala – Republic of Guatemala	UN member state	None	
G	Guinea – Republic of Guinea (Note: Also known as Guinea-Conakry.)	UN member state	None	
G	Guinea-Bissau – Republic of Guinea-Bissau	UN member state	None	
G	Guyana – Co-operative Republic of Guyana	UN member state	None	
H	Haiti – Republic of Haiti	UN member state	None	
H	Honduras – Republic of Honduras	UN member state	None	
H	Hungary	UN member state	None	Member of the EU.
I	Iceland (Note: While sometimes referred to as the "Republic of Iceland" and sometimes its counterpart Lýðveldið Ísland in Icelandic, the official name of the country is simply "Iceland". One example of the former is the name of the Constitution of Iceland, which in Icelandic is Stjórnarskrá lýðveldisins Íslands and is translated to "the Constitution of the republic of Iceland". However, in this usage, "republic" is not capitalised.)	UN member state	None	
I	India – Republic of India	UN member state	None	India is a federation of 28 states and eight union territories.
I	Indonesia – Republic of Indonesia	UN member state	None	Indonesia has nine autonomous provinces: Aceh, Central Papua, Highland Papua, Jakarta, Papua, South Papua, Southwest Papua, West Papua, and Yogyakarta.
I	Iran – Islamic Republic of Iran	UN member state	None	
I	Iraq – Republic of Iraq	UN member state	None	Iraq is a federation of 19 governorates, four of which make up the autonomous Kurdistan Region.
I	Ireland (Note: "Ireland" is the official name of the country in English. The "Republic of Ireland" (the official description in English) and "Éire" (the official name in Irish) have sometimes been used unofficially to distinguish the state from the larger island of Ireland, however, this is officially deprecated. See names of the Irish state.)	UN member state	None	Member of the EU.
I	Israel – State of Israel	UN member state	Partially unrecognised.	Israel exerts strong control over the territory claimed by Palestine. It has annexed East Jerusalem, an act not recognised by the international community. Israel has varying levels of control over the rest of the West Bank, and although it ended its permanent civilian or military presence in the Gaza Strip, it is still considered to be the occupying power under international law. Israel is not recognised as a state by 23 UN members and the Sahrawi Republic. The Palestine Liberation Organization, recognised by a majority of UN member states as the representative of the Palestinian people, recognised Israel in 1993.
I	Italy – Italian Republic	UN member state	None	Member of the EU. Italy has five autonomous regions: Aosta Valley, Friuli-Venezia Giulia, Sardinia, Sicily and Trentino-Alto Adige/Südtirol.
I	Ivory Coast – Republic of Côte d'Ivoire (Note: The Government of Ivory Coast uses "Côte d'Ivoire" as the official English name of the country.)	UN member state	None	
J	Jamaica	UN member state	None	Jamaica is a Commonwealth realm.
J	Japan	UN member state	None	
J	Jordan – Hashemite Kingdom of Jordan	UN member state	None	
K	Kazakhstan – Republic of Kazakhstan	UN member state	None	
K	Kenya – Republic of Kenya	UN member state	None	
K	Kiribati – Republic of Kiribati	UN member state	None	
K	Kuwait – State of Kuwait	UN member state	None	
K	Kyrgyzstan – Kyrgyz Republic	UN member state	None	
L	Laos – Lao People's Democratic Republic	UN member state	None	
L	Latvia – Republic of Latvia	UN member state	None	Member of the EU.
L	Lebanon – Lebanese Republic	UN member state	None	
L	Lesotho – Kingdom of Lesotho	UN member state	None	
L	Liberia – Republic of Liberia	UN member state	None	
L	Libya – State of Libya	UN member state	None	
L	Liechtenstein – Principality of Liechtenstein	UN member state	None	
L	Lithuania – Republic of Lithuania	UN member state	None	Member of the EU.
L	Luxembourg – Grand Duchy of Luxembourg	UN member state	None	Member of the EU.
M	Madagascar – Republic of Madagascar	UN member state	None	
M	Malawi – Republic of Malawi	UN member state	None	
M	Malaysia	UN member state	None	Malaysia is a federation of 13 states and three federal territories.
M	Maldives – Republic of Maldives	UN member state	None	
M	Mali – Republic of Mali	UN member state	None	
M	Malta – Republic of Malta	UN member state	None	Member of the EU.
M	Marshall Islands – Republic of the Marshall Islands	UN member state	None	Under the Compact of Free Association with the United States.
M	Mauritania – Islamic Republic of Mauritania	UN member state	None	
M	Mauritius – Republic of Mauritius	UN member state	None	Mauritius has an autonomous island, Rodrigues.
M	Mexico – United Mexican States	UN member state	None	Mexico is a federation of 31 states and one autonomous city.
M	Micronesia, Federated States of	UN member state	None	Under the Compact of Free Association with the United States. The Federated States of Micronesia is a federation of four states.
M	Moldova – Republic of Moldova	UN member state	None	Moldova has two autonomous territorial units, Gagauzia and the Left Bank of the Dniester. The latter and a city, Bender (Tighina), are under the de facto control of Transnistria.
M	Monaco – Principality of Monaco	UN member state	None	
M	Mongolia	UN member state	None	
M	Montenegro	UN member state	None	
M	Morocco – Kingdom of Morocco	UN member state	None	A part of the Moroccan-claimed Western Sahara is controlled by the partially-recognised Sahrawi Republic.
M	Mozambique – Republic of Mozambique	UN member state	None	
M	Myanmar – Republic of the Union of Myanmar (Note: The country's official name of Myanmar, adopted in 1989, has been mixed and controversial, with the former name "Burma" still being used in many cases. See: Names of Myanmar.)	UN member state	None	Wa State is a de jure self-governing region within Myanmar, and a de facto independent state. The United Nations has not recognised the ruling government of Myanmar.
N	Namibia – Republic of Namibia	UN member state	None	
N	Nauru – Republic of Naoero (Note: Formerly the "Republic of Nauru". In 2026, the United Nations recognised "Naoero" as the official English name of the country after a request made by the Nauruan government.)	UN member state	None	
N	Nepal	UN member state	None	Nepal is a federation composed of seven provinces.
N	Netherlands – Kingdom of the Netherlands	UN member state	None	Member of the EU. The Kingdom of the Netherlands includes four areas with substantial autonomy: Aruba; Curaçao; Netherlands; Sint Maarten; The Netherlands, Aruba, Curaçao and Sint Maarten form the four constituent countries of the Kingdom. Three overseas parts of the Netherlands (Bonaire, Saba and Sint Eustatius) are special municipalities of the constituent country of the Netherlands. (Note: The designation "the Netherlands" can refer either to the constituent country of the Netherlands or to the entire Kingdom (e.g. in international organisations).) The Kingdom of the Netherlands as a whole is a member of the EU, but EU law only wholly applies to parts within Europe.
N	New Zealand	UN member state	None	New Zealand is a Commonwealth realm, and has one dependent territory and one claimed Antarctic dependent territory: Tokelau; Ross Dependency; The New Zealand Government acts for the entire Realm of New Zealand in all international contexts, which has responsibilities for (but no rights of control over) two freely associated states: Cook Islands; Niue; The Cook Islands and Niue have diplomatic relations with 63 and 25 UN members respectively. They have full treaty-making capacity in the UN, and are members of some UN specialised agencies.
N	Nicaragua – Republic of Nicaragua	UN member state	None	Nicaragua contains two autonomous regions, North Caribbean Coast and South Caribbean Coast.
N	Niger – Republic of the Niger	UN member state	None	
N	Nigeria – Federal Republic of Nigeria	UN member state	None	Nigeria is a federation of 36 states and one federal territory.
N	North Korea – Democratic People's Republic of Korea	UN member state	Claimed by South Korea.	North Korea is not recognised by 2 UN members, Japan, and South Korea, the latter of which claims to be the sole legitimate government of Korea.
N	North Macedonia – Republic of North Macedonia (Note: Formerly known constitutionally as the "Republic of Macedonia" from 1991 to 2019 and under the international designation of "the former Yugoslav Republic of Macedonia" (FYROM) from 1993 to 2019 due to the Macedonia naming dispute with Greece. Following the Prespa Agreement going into effect in February 2019, the country was renamed "North Macedonia".)	UN member state	None	
N	Norway – Kingdom of Norway	UN member state	None	Norway has two unincorporated areas in Europe: Svalbard is an integral part of Norway, but has a special status due to the Svalbard Treaty.; Jan Mayen is an island with no permanent population that is an integral part of Norway, although unincorporated.; Norway has one dependent territory and two claimed Antarctic dependent territories in the Southern Hemisphere: Bouvet Island; Peter I Island; Queen Maud Land
O	Oman – Sultanate of Oman	UN member state	None	
P	Pakistan – Islamic Republic of Pakistan	UN member state	None	Pakistan is a federation of four provinces and one capital territory. Pakistan exercises control over certain portions of Kashmir, but has not officially annexed any of it, instead regarding it as a disputed territory. The portions that it controls are divided into two territories, administered separately from Pakistan proper: Azad Kashmir; Gilgit-Baltistan; Azad Kashmir describes itself as a "self-governing state under Pakistani control", while Gilgit-Baltistan is described in its governance order as a group of "areas" with self-government. These territories are not usually regarded as sovereign, as they do not fulfil the criteria set out by the declarative theory of statehood (for example, their current laws do not allow them to engage independently in relations with other states). Several state functions of these territories (such as foreign affairs and defense) are performed by Pakistan.
P	Palau – Republic of Palau	UN member state	None	Under the Compact of Free Association with the United States.
P	Palestine – State of Palestine	UN General Assembly observer state; member of two UN specialised agencies	Partially unrecognised. Occupied by Israel.	The State of Palestine, declared in 1988, is not recognised as a state by Israel but has received diplomatic recognition from 157 states. The proclaimed state has no agreed territorial borders, or effective control over much of the territory that it proclaimed. The Palestinian Authority is an interim administrative body formed as a result of the Oslo Accords that exercises limited autonomous jurisdiction within Palestine. In foreign relations, Palestine is represented by the Palestine Liberation Organization. The State of Palestine is a member state of UNESCO, UNIDO and other international organisations.
P	Panama – Republic of Panama	UN member state	None	
P	Papua New Guinea – Independent State of Papua New Guinea	UN member state	None	Papua New Guinea is a Commonwealth realm with one autonomous region, Bougainville.
P	Paraguay – Republic of Paraguay	UN member state	None	
P	Peru – Republic of Peru	UN member state	None	
P	Philippines – Republic of the Philippines	UN member state	None	The Philippines contains one autonomous region, Bangsamoro.
P	Poland – Republic of Poland	UN member state	None	Member of the EU.
P	Portugal – Portuguese Republic	UN member state	None	Member of the EU. Portugal contains two autonomous regions, the Azores and Madeira.
Q	Qatar – State of Qatar	UN member state	None	
R	Romania	UN member state	None	Member of the EU.
R	Russia – Russian Federation	UN member state	None	Russia is a federation of 83 internationally recognised federal subjects (republics, oblasts, krais, autonomous okrugs, federal cities, and an autonomous oblast). Several of the federal subjects are ethnic republics.
R	Rwanda – Republic of Rwanda	UN member state	None	
S	Saint Kitts and Nevis – Federation of Saint Kitts and Nevis (Note: "Federation of Saint Christopher and Nevis" is sometimes also used as the official name.)	UN member state	None	Saint Kitts and Nevis is a Commonwealth realm and is a federation of two islands, Saint Kitts and Nevis.
S	Saint Lucia	UN member state	None	Saint Lucia is a Commonwealth realm.
S	Saint Vincent and the Grenadines	UN member state	None	Saint Vincent and the Grenadines is a Commonwealth realm.
S	Samoa – Independent State of Samoa	UN member state	None	
S	San Marino – Republic of San Marino	UN member state	None	
S	São Tomé and Príncipe – Democratic Republic of Sao Tome and Principe	UN member state	None	São Tomé and Príncipe contains one autonomous region, Príncipe.
S	Saudi Arabia – Kingdom of Saudi Arabia	UN member state	None	
S	Senegal – Republic of Senegal	UN member state	None	
S	Serbia – Republic of Serbia	UN member state	None	Serbia contains two autonomous provinces, Vojvodina and Kosovo and Metohija. The latter is under the de facto control of Kosovo.
S	Seychelles – Republic of Seychelles	UN member state	None	
S	Sierra Leone – Republic of Sierra Leone	UN member state	None	
S	Singapore – Republic of Singapore	UN member state	None	
S	Slovakia – Slovak Republic	UN member state	None	Member of the EU.
S	Slovenia – Republic of Slovenia	UN member state	None	Member of the EU.
S	Solomon Islands	UN member state	None	Solomon Islands is a Commonwealth realm.
S	Somalia – Federal Republic of Somalia	UN member state	None	Somalia is a federation of seven states. Two, Galmudug and Puntland, have self-declared autonomy, while one, Somaliland, is de facto independent.
S	South Africa – Republic of South Africa	UN member state	None	
S	South Korea – Republic of Korea	UN member state	None (Note: North Korea abandoned its 78-year-long claim over South Korea in May 2026.)	South Korea has three special self-governing provinces, Jeju, Gangwon, and Jeonbuk, and one special self-governing city, Sejong.
S	South Sudan – Republic of South Sudan	UN member state	None	South Sudan is a federation of 10 states and three administrative areas. The Abyei Area is a zone with "special administrative status" established by the Comprehensive Peace Agreement in 2005. It is de jure a condominium of South Sudan and Sudan, but de facto administered by two competing administrations and the United Nations.
S	Spain – Kingdom of Spain	UN member state	None	Member of the EU. Spain is divided into 17 autonomous communities and two autonomous cities. (Note: Spain holds several small overseas territories scattered along the Mediterranean coast bordering Morocco, known as the plazas de soberanía.)
S	Sri Lanka – Democratic Socialist Republic of Sri Lanka (Note: Formerly known as the "Dominion of Ceylon" until 1972.)	UN member state	None	
S	Sudan – Republic of the Sudan	UN member state	None	Sudan is a federation of 18 states. The Abyei Area is a zone with "special administrative status" established by the Comprehensive Peace Agreement in 2005. It is de jure a condominium of South Sudan and Sudan, but de facto administered by two competing administrations and the United Nations.
S	Suriname – Republic of Suriname	UN member state	None	
S	Sweden – Kingdom of Sweden	UN member state	None	Member of the EU.
S	Switzerland – Swiss Confederation	UN member state	None	Switzerland is a federation of 26 cantons.
S	Syria – Syrian Arab Republic	UN member state	None	Syria has one self-declared autonomous region, the Administrative Council of Jabal Bashan.
T	Tajikistan – Republic of Tajikistan	UN member state	None	Tajikistan contains one autonomous region, Gorno-Badakhshan.
T	Tanzania – United Republic of Tanzania	UN member state	None	Tanzania contains one autonomous region, Zanzibar.
T	Thailand – Kingdom of Thailand	UN member state	None	
T	Timor-Leste – Democratic Republic of Timor-Leste (Note: Formerly also known as "East Timor".)	UN member state	None	
T	Togo – Togolese Republic	UN member state	None	
T	Tonga – Kingdom of Tonga	UN member state	None	
T	Trinidad and Tobago – Republic of Trinidad and Tobago	UN member state	None	Trinidad and Tobago contains one autonomous region, Tobago.
T	Tunisia – Republic of Tunisia	UN member state	None	
T	Turkey – Republic of Türkiye (Note: Formerly the "Republic of Turkey". In 2022, the United Nations recognised "Türkiye" as the official English name of the country after a request made by the Turkish government.)	UN member state	None	
T	Turkmenistan	UN member state	None	
T	Tuvalu	UN member state	None	Tuvalu is a Commonwealth realm.
U	Uganda – Republic of Uganda	UN member state	None	
U	Ukraine	UN member state	None	Ukraine contains one autonomous region, the Autonomous Republic of Crimea, which is under the control of Russia. Nine other areas of Ukraine are under full or partial Russian control, including Dnipropetrovsk, Donetsk, Kharkiv, Kherson, Luhansk, Mykolaiv, Sumy, Zaporizhzhia oblasts and Sevastopol.
U	United Arab Emirates	UN member state	None	The United Arab Emirates is a federation of seven emirates.
U	United Kingdom – United Kingdom of Great Britain and Northern Ireland	UN member state	None	The United Kingdom is a Commonwealth realm consisting of four constituent countries: England, Northern Ireland, Scotland, and Wales. The United Kingdom has the following 13 overseas territories and one claimed Antarctic dependent territory: Akrotiri and Dhekelia (Note: There is no official flag for Akrotiri and Dhekelia; it is represented by the flag of the United Kingdom, the Union Jack. See Flag of Akrotiri and Dhekelia); Anguilla; Bermuda; British Indian Ocean Territory; British Virgin Islands; Cayman Islands; Falkland Islands; Gibraltar; Montserrat; Pitcairn Islands; Saint Helena, Ascension and Tristan da Cunha (Note: There is no official flag for Saint Helena, Ascension and Tristan da Cunha; it is represented by the flag of the United Kingdom, the Union Jack. However, the 3 islands that comprise it do have flags. See Flag of Saint Helena, Ascension and Tristan da Cunha); South Georgia and the South Sandwich Islands; Turks and Caicos Islands; British Antarctic Territory; The British monarch also has direct sovereignty over three self-governing Crown Dependencies: Guernsey; Isle of Man; Jersey
U	United States – United States of America	UN member state	None	The United States is a federation of 50 states, one federal district, and one incorporated territory (Palmyra Atoll). Additionally, the federal government of the United States has sovereignty over 13 unincorporated territories. Of these unincorporated territories, five are inhabited possessions: American Samoa; Guam; Northern Mariana Islands; Puerto Rico; U.S. Virgin Islands; The United States also has sovereignty over eight uninhabited territories: Baker Island; Howland Island; Jarvis Island; Johnston Atoll; Kingman Reef; Midway Atoll; Navassa Island; Wake Island; The United States disputes sovereignty over two territories: Bajo Nuevo Bank; Serranilla Bank; The United States is under a Compact of Free Association with the following entities: Marshall Islands; Federated States of Micronesia; Palau
U	Uruguay – Oriental Republic of Uruguay	UN member state	None	
U	Uzbekistan – Republic of Uzbekistan	UN member state	None	Uzbekistan contains one autonomous region, Karakalpakstan.
V	Vanuatu – Republic of Vanuatu	UN member state	None	
V	Vatican City – Vatican City State	UN General Assembly observer state under the designation of "Holy See"; member of three UN specialised agencies	None	Administered by the Holy See, a sovereign entity with diplomatic relations to 183 states (including 180 UN member states, the Cook Islands, the Republic of China (Taiwan), and Palestine). In addition, the European Union and the Sovereign Military Order of Malta maintain diplomatic relations with the Holy See. The Holy See is a member of three UN specialised agencies (ITU, UPU, and WIPO) and the IAEA, as well as being a permanent observer of the UN (in the category of "Non-member State") and multiple other UN System organisations. The Vatican City is governed by officials appointed by the Pope, who is the Bishop of the Diocese of Rome and ex officio sovereign of Vatican City.
V	Venezuela – Bolivarian Republic of Venezuela	UN member state	None	Venezuela is a federation of 23 states, one capital district, and the federal dependencies. See: Administrative divisions of Venezuela.
V	Vietnam – Socialist Republic of Viet Nam	UN member state	None	
Y	Yemen – Republic of Yemen	UN member state	None	
Z	Zambia – Republic of Zambia	UN member state	None	
Z	Zimbabwe – Republic of Zimbabwe	UN member state	None	

=== Other states ===
Membership within the UN System
Member state of a UN Specialised Agency
No membership

Sovereignty dispute
Undisputed sovereignty
Disputed sovereignty

Short name or formal name	Membership within the UN System	Sovereignty dispute	Further information on status and recognition of sovereignty
Abkhazia – Republic of Abkhazia	No membership	Claimed by Georgia. Occupied by Russia.	Recognised by Russia, Nicaragua, Syria, Venezuela, South Ossetia, and Transnistria. Claimed in whole by Georgia as the Autonomous Republic of Abkhazia.
Cook Islands	Member of eight UN specialised agencies	None (See political status)	A state in free association with New Zealand and part of its realm, the Cook Islands maintains diplomatic relations with at least 65 UN member states and 3 other states and is recognised as a sovereign state by a number of them. The Cook Islands is a member of multiple UN agencies with full treaty-making capacity. It shares a head of state with New Zealand as well as having shared citizenship.
Kosovo – Republic of Kosovo	Member of two UN specialised agencies	Claimed by Serbia	Pursuant to United Nations Security Council Resolution 1244, Kosovo was placed under the administration of the United Nations Interim Administration Mission in Kosovo in 1999. Kosovo declared independence in 2008, and it has received diplomatic recognition from 118 UN member states, the Cook Islands, Niue, and the Republic of China (Taiwan), while 8 of those states have recognised Kosovo only to later withdraw their recognition. Serbia continues to maintain its sovereignty claim over Kosovo. Other UN member states and non UN member states continue to recognise Serbian sovereignty or have taken no position on the question. Kosovo is a member of the International Monetary Fund and the World Bank Group. The Republic of Kosovo has de facto control over most of the territory, with limited control in North Kosovo.
Niue	Member of five UN specialised agencies	None (See political status)	A state in free association with New Zealand and part of its realm, Niue maintains diplomatic relations with at least 28 UN member states and 2 other states and is recognised as a sovereign state by a number of them. Niue is a member of multiple UN agencies with full treaty-making capacity. It shares a head of state with New Zealand as well as having shared citizenship.
Northern Cyprus – Turkish Republic of Northern Cyprus	No membership	Claimed by Cyprus. Occupied by Turkey.	Recognised only by Turkey. Under the name "Turkish Cypriot State", it is an observer state of the Organisation of Islamic Cooperation and the Economic Cooperation Organization. Northern Cyprus is claimed in whole by the Republic of Cyprus.
Sahrawi Arab Democratic Republic	No membership	Claimed and occupied by Morocco.	The Polisario Front, which administers the Sahrawi Arab Democratic Republic, is recognised by the UN as the legitimate representative of the people of Western Sahara. Recognised at some stage by 84 UN member states, 38 of which have since withdrawn or frozen their recognition. It is a founding member of the African Union, an international organisation with permanent observer status at the UN General Assembly. The territories under its control, the so-called Free Zone, are claimed in whole by Morocco. In turn, the Sahrawi Arab Democratic Republic claims the Moroccan-occupied part of Western Sahara to the west of the Moroccan sand wall. Its government resides in exile in the Sahrawi refugee camps of Tindouf, Algeria.
Somaliland – Republic of Somaliland	No membership	Claimed by Somalia	A de facto independent state recognised by Israel. Claimed in whole by Somalia.
South Ossetia – Republic of South Ossetia–the State of Alania	No membership	Claimed by Georgia. Occupied by Russia.	A de facto independent state, recognised by Russia, Nicaragua, Syria, Venezuela, Abkhazia, and Transnistria. Claimed in whole by Georgia.
Taiwan – Republic of China	UN member state until 1971, now no membership	Partially unrecognised. Claimed by the People's Republic of China.	A state competing (nominally) for recognition with the People's Republic of China (PRC) as the government of China since 1949. The Republic of China (ROC) controls the islands of Taiwan, Penghu, Kinmen, the Matsu Islands, and Pratas Island, as well as Taiping Island and Zhongzhou Reef of the Spratly Islands, and has not renounced claims over its annexed territories on the mainland. The ROC is recognised by 11 UN member states and Vatican City, none of which recognise the PRC. In addition to these relations, the ROC also maintains unofficial relations with 58 UN member states, one self-declared state (Somaliland), three territories (Guam, Hong Kong, and Macau), and the European Union via its representative offices and consulates under the One China principle. Taiwan has the 31st-largest diplomatic network in the world with 110 offices. The territory of the ROC is claimed in whole by the PRC. The ROC participates in international organisations under a variety of pseudonyms, most commonly "Chinese Taipei". In the WTO, the ROC has full membership under the designation of "Separate Customs Territory of Taiwan, Penghu, Kinmen and Matsu". The ROC was a founding member of the UN and enjoyed membership from 1945 to 1971, with veto power in the UN Security Council. See: China and the United Nations.
Transnistria – Pridnestrovian Moldavian Republic (Note: Also known as "Pridnestrovie".)	No membership	Claimed by Moldova. Occupied by Russia.	A de facto independent state, recognised only by Abkhazia and South Ossetia. Claimed in whole by Moldova.

== See also ==
- Armorial of sovereign states
- Associated state
- Condominium
- Dependent territory
- Independence referendum
- ISO 3166-1
- List of active separatist movements
- List of adjectival and demonymic forms for countries and nations
- List of administrative divisions by country
- List of countries and dependencies and their capitals in native languages
- List of countries and dependencies by area
- List of countries and dependencies by population
- List of countries and territories by the United Nations geoscheme
- List of country-name etymologies
- List of governments in exile
- List of international rankings
- List of ISO 3166 country codes
- List of micronations
- List of national capitals
- List of national flags of sovereign states
- List of proposed state mergers
- List of rebel groups that control territory
- List of states with limited recognition
- List of territorial disputes
- List of territories governed by the United Nations
- Lists of political entities by century
- Lists of state leaders by century
- Member states of the United Nations
- Sovereign state
  - List of former sovereign states
  - List of sovereign states and dependent territories by continent
  - List of sovereign states by date of formation
- Template:Clickable world map
- Terra nullius
- United Nations list of non-self-governing territories

== Bibliography ==
- Bissio, Roberto Remo, ed. (1995). The World: A Third World Guide: 1995/96. Montevideo: Instituto del Tercer Mundo. ISBN 978-0-85598-291-1. OCLC 476299738.
- "Countries or areas, codes and abbreviations". Statistics Division, United Nations. 1 April 2010. Archived from the original on 28 June 2014.
- Davis, Tim (19 February 2009). "World Countries and States List". TimDavis.com.au.
- "Geographic Names" (PDF). Department of Public Information, Cartographic Section, United Nations. 7 September 2000.
- "ISO 3166-1 Country names and code elements". International Organization for Standardization. 2010. Archived from the original on 23 December 2013.
- "List of countries, territories and currencies". Publications Office of the European Union. 4 May 2010. Archived from the original on 25 December 2018.
- "The World Factbook". United States: Central Intelligence Agency. 2010. Archived from the original on 7 June 2007.
- World of Information (Firm), and International Chamber of Commerce (2003). Middle East Review 2003/04: The Economic and Business Report (27th ed.). London: Kogan Page. p. 161. ISBN 978-0-7494-4066-4. OCLC 51992589.
- Slayden, Greg. "The Countries of the World". PeakBagger.com. Archived from the original on 24 July 2020.
