= Political status of the Cook Islands and Niue =

Associated states in relation to New Zealand: 1. New Zealand; 2. Niue; 3. The Cook Islands

The political status of the Cook Islands and Niue is formally defined as being states in free association within the Realm of New Zealand, which is made up of the Cook Islands, Niue, and New Zealand and its territories, Tokelau and the Ross Dependency. Despite both states acting internationally as independent countries, all Cook Islands and Niue nationals are automatically New Zealand citizens, and while both the Cook Islands and Niue have expressed a desire to become full members of the United Nations, New Zealand has said that they would not support the application without a change in their constitutional relationship, in particular their right to New Zealand citizenship.

A total of 65 UN member states have recognised the Cook Islands as a sovereign country and established diplomatic relations, whereas 28 UN member states have done so with Niue. However, New Zealand may still carry out defence and foreign affairs on behalf of the two associated states when requested.

== Sovereignty and self-government ==
New Zealand's current four-year plan for the Cook Islands, drafted October 2021

New Zealand's current four-year plan for Niue, drafted December 2021

New Zealand is officially responsible for the defence and foreign affairs of the Cook Islands and Niue. The Act of the New Zealand Parliament which established self-governance mentions a role for New Zealand, but the Constitution of the Cook Islands does not. However, these responsibilities confer New Zealand no rights of control and can only be exercised at the request of the Cook Islands and Niue. The Cook Islands and Niue have been recognised as sovereign states by some countries, and maintain diplomatic relations under their own name. The United States recognises the Cook Islands as a sovereign and independent state, and has signed treaties with the Cook Islands government. Moreover, the Secretary General of the United Nations has determined that the admission of the Cook Islands and Niue into the World Health Assembly means that they have been accepted as states by the international community.

Although the Cook Islands and Niue behave as sovereign states in international law, their constitutional statuses within the Realm of New Zealand (i.e., for matters of New Zealand domestic law) is different from that of a fully independent state, considering that all of Niue's and the Cook Islands' nationals are automatically New Zealand citizens, and both have New Zealand's Monarch as their own head of state. While both the Cook Islands and Niue have expressed a desire to become a UN member state, New Zealand has said that they would not support the application without a change in their constitutional relationship, in particular their right to New Zealand citizenship. However, New Zealand has never formally opposed such an application, nor has it argued that either country would not be within its sovereign right to do so. The foreign minister of Cook Islands has stated that a referendum would be required to determine whether to join the UN. In 2025, Cook Islands prime minister Mark Brown stated that the UN had confirmed that the Cook Islands did not meet the requirements for UN membership. Additionally, in response to a push to introduce Cook Islander passports and agreements made with China, a spokesperson for New Zealand foreign minister Winston Peters stated, "Unlike Samoa, Tonga and Tuvalu, the Cook Islands is not a fully independent and sovereign state", unless its status and relationship with New Zealand are changed by referendum.

Some scholars have argued that a lack of separate Cook Islands citizenship places an effective limit on the ability of the Cook Islands to act as a sovereign entity, while others have argued that the participation of the Cook Islands in international organisations (such as the Pacific Islands Forum) shows that Cook Islands sovereignty is not limited by the free association arrangement.

== History ==
Formerly dependencies of New Zealand, the Cook Islands became a state in free association with New Zealand on 4 August 1965; Niue became a state in free association on 19 October 1974, after a constitutional referendum. In 1992, the UN recognised both states' right to establish diplomatic relations with other countries. Since then, both the Cook Islands and Niue have been allowed to attend UN-sponsored conferences open to "all States" as well as sign and ratify UN treaties open to "non-member states".

New Zealand has formally allowed the Cook Islands to independently conduct its own foreign affairs since 6 April 2001. Niue was granted this power in 2007.

The Repertory of Practice of United Nations Organs records that in 1988 "New Zealand stated that its future participation in international agreements would no longer extend to" Niue and the Cook Islands. The Cook Islands and Niue were granted membership of UNESCO by 1993 and of the World Health Organization by 1994. Also by 1994, the UN Secretariat had "recognized the full treaty-making capacity ... of Niue". As of 2022, the Cook Islands, Kosovo, and Niue are the only state parties that participate in UN specialised agencies, but which are not member states of the UN nor observer states with the United Nations General Assembly. Additionally, the Republic of China on Taiwan participated in the World Health Assembly as Chinese Taipei from 2009 to 2016.

In September 2022, the United States announced its recognition of the Cook Islands and Niue as sovereign states during President Biden's Summit with Pacific Islands Countries (PIC) Leaders in Washington, D.C. In September 2023, recognition was declared and diplomatic relations were established. The United States also announced it intends to open an embassy in the Cook Islands and an embassy in Niue in 2024.

== Positions taken by states ==
=== States with which the Cook Islands and Niue have diplomatic relations ===
Relations of the Cook Islands and Niue
Status of the Cook Islands' and Niue's diplomatic outreach Cook Islands and Niue Maintain relations with both Maintain relations with the Cook Islands only No relations
State	Cook Islands	Niue
Malaysia	2 May 1992	30 January 1996
New Zealand	1993	2 August 1993
Australia	1994	27 February 2014
Nauru	1994	9 January 2004 or before
Papua New Guinea	1995	9 December 2014
China	25 July 1997	12 December 2007
India	May 1998	30 August 2012
Fiji	14 July 1998	7 November 2023
France	19 October 1999	15 January 2012 or before
Germany	11 September 2001	3 February 2026
Cuba	2 September 2002	5 September 2014
Italy	9 October 2003	12 September 2015
Thailand	24 May 2005	27 August 2013
Israel	April 2008	1 August 2023
Turkey	28 October 2008	7 June 2014
Switzerland	7 March 2011	9 August 2023
Japan	16 June 2011	4 August 2015
Philippines	12 December 2011	27 September 2022
Singapore	6 August 2012	6 August 2012
South Korea	22 February 2013	29 May 2023
Samoa	30 August 2013	June 2014 or before
Tuvalu	August 2013	11 July 2022
Marshall Islands	3 September 2013	30 August 2024
Kosovo	18 May 2015	23 June 2015
Brazil	21 August 2015	2 September 2016
Chile	3 August 2016	6 July 2021
Peru	September 2017	13 July 2020
Indonesia	12 July 2019	12 July 2019
Canada	20 May 2023	12 September 2023
United States	25 September 2023	25 September 2023
Norway	18 July 1991	No relations
Portugal	12 August 1995	No relations
South Africa	9 February 1996	No relations
Iran	1996	No relations
Spain	29 January 1998	No relations
Holy See	29 April 1999	No relations
Timor-Leste	2002	No relations
Jamaica	14 May 2003	No relations
Belgium	6 April 2005	No relations
Czechia	12 May 2008	No relations
Netherlands	16 August 2011	No relations
Solomon Islands	1 September 2013	No relations
Kiribati	3 September 2013	No relations
Palau	3 September 2013	No relations
Vanuatu	2013	No relations
Micronesia	24 September 2014	No relations
Tonga	18 November 2014	No relations
Malta	6 October 2017	No relations
Iceland	13 October 2017	No relations
Antigua and Barbuda	9 November 2017	No relations
United Arab Emirates	5 August 2018	No relations
Estonia	25 August 2018	No relations
Hungary	20 September 2018	No relations
Greece	20 October 2018	No relations
Kuwait	8 December 2021	No relations
Vietnam	26 April 2022	No relations
Ireland	21 November 2022	No relations
Saudi Arabia	11 April 2023	No relations
Ghana	8 November 2023	No relations
Mexico	21 November 2023	No relations
Panama	8 March 2024	No relations
Bangladesh	11 April 2024	No relations
Ecuador	21 May 2024	No relations
Seychelles	31 May 2024	No relations
Poland	20 March 2025	No relations
Azerbaijan	7 April 2025	No relations
Cambodia	14 May 2025	No relations

=== States that recognise the Cook Islands and Niue as sovereign states ===
State	Position	Relations with	
State	Position	Cook Islands	Niue
Germany	In March 2001, Germany recognized the Cook Islands as an independent state; diplomatic relations between the two countries were established on 11 September 2001. On 7 January 2026, Germany recognized Niue as an independent state; diplomatic relations between the two countries were established on 3 February 2026.	Yes	Yes
United States	In 1980, the Cook Islands–United States Maritime Boundary Treaty was signed. The United States recognised the ability of the Cook Islands to negotiate a treaty on its own only after consulting the New Zealand government regarding the exact status of the Cook Islands. In response to the United States' request the New Zealand government confirmed "the competence of the Cook Islands Government to undertake the obligations and exercise the rights under the draft [bilateral] treaty". Consequently, the United States signed a bilateral treaty with the Cook Islands recognizing the latter's sovereignty over the islands subject to the said treaty and its treaty-making power. The Cook Islands and the United States have maintained consular relations since 1995. In 1997, the United States and Niue signed a maritime boundary treaty that mentioned how "Prior to signing the treaty, the political status of Niue was addressed". In 2011, the State Department included the Cook Islands and Niue under the sovereignty of New Zealand in its list of "Dependencies and Areas of Special Sovereignty". In 2014, The World Factbook listed the Cook Islands and Niue as "self-governing territor[ies] in free association with New Zealand". As of 2023, both the State Department and The World Factbook considered the Cook Islands and Niue to be independent states. In September 2022, the United States announced its intention to recognise the Cook Islands and Niue as sovereign states during President Biden's Summit with Pacific Islands Countries (PIC) Leaders in Washington, D.C. In September 2023, recognition was declared and diplomatic relations were established. Although the wording used by the United States explicitly referred to the Cook Islands and Niue as "a sovereign and independent state", then-New Zealand Prime Minister Chris Hipkins noted that "in order to recognise those specific countries, the wording that they [the United States] use is they recognise their sovereignty but actually they also recognise, through diplomatic channels, the unique constitutional relationship that those countries have with New Zealand as well." The United States also announced it intended to open embassies in the Cook Islands and in Niue in 2024. However, these embassies were not mentioned in the official fact sheet released for a follow-up summit in September 2023, and as of January 2025, no embassy or consulate had been opened in either country.	Yes	Yes

=== States that recognise the Cook Islands and Niue as self-governing territories ===
State	Position	Relations with	
State	Position	Cook Islands	Niue
France	Though the French Ambassador to New Zealand is also accredited to the Cook Islands and Niue, as of 2015 France still described them as having "no international sovereignty".	Yes	Yes
Israel	On 1 July 1994, Israel and New Zealand signed an agreement establishing diplomatic relations. The document stated: In the cases of the association of New Zealand with the Cook Islands and Niue, the relevant constitution acts provide that, while these territories will be self-governing, 'Her Majesty the Queen in right of New Zealand' will retain responsibility for 'external affairs and defence'.... It should also be noted, however, that there exist a number of instances of non-independent entities being permitted to participate in international organizations, though this almost only occurs in cases of associate statehood. Israel established diplomatic relations with the Cook Islands in April 2008 and with Niue on 3 August 2023.	Yes	Yes
New Zealand	Cook Islands Further information: Cook Islands–New Zealand relations On 11 June 2001, Helen Clark and Terepai Maoate signed an agreement establishing diplomatic relations between the Cook Islands and New Zealand. The document stated: Any action taken by New Zealand in respect of its constitutional responsibilities for the foreign affairs of the Cook Islands will be taken on the delegated authority, and as an agent or facilitator at the specific request of, the Cook Islands. Section 5 of the Cook Islands Constitution Act 1964 thus records a responsibility to assist the Cook Islands and not a qualification of Cook Islands' statehood. Clark later said that if the Cook Islands wanted to be its own sovereign state, it would first need its own citizenship. New Zealand believes that if the Cook Islands were to become a sovereign state, an independence referendum and constitutional change would occur. The eligibility of New Zealand citizenship would have to change. In 2025, a spokesperson for New Zealand foreign minister Winston Peters stated, "Unlike Samoa, Tonga and Tuvalu, the Cook Islands is not a fully independent and sovereign state", unless its status and relationship with New Zealand are changed by referendum. Niue Further information: New Zealand–Niue relations New Zealand has stated that Niue's free association is "a status distinct from that of full independence".	Yes	Yes

== The Cook Islands and Niue as microstates ==
While their respective relationships with New Zealand, as well as their small size, make them rather unusual states, it has been argued that their status is far from unique. According to Zbigniew Dumienski, both the Cook Islands and Niue can be seen as microstates, which are defined as: "modern protected states, i.e. sovereign states that have been able to unilaterally depute certain attributes of sovereignty to larger powers in exchange for benign protection of their political and economic viability against their geographic or demographic constraints." Both the Cook Islands and Niue, as well as such states as Andorra, Liechtenstein, Monaco, Nauru, San Marino, and Vatican City, fit into this definition of microstates.
