= Australia–Cook Islands relations =

- Australia: Cook Islands

Australia–Cook Islands relations are the bilateral relations between the Australia and Cook Islands. Australia and the Cook Islands established diplomatic relations in 1994, with the Australian High Commissioner resident in Wellington, New Zealand.

== Resident diplomatic missions ==
- Australia has a high commission in Rarotonga, opened in December 2019. For a detailed history of Australian accreditation to the Cook Islands see List of high commissioners of Australia to the Cook Islands.
- Although the Cook Islands maintained a resident high commission in Canberra for some years in the 1990s, at present it has no diplomatic representation to Australia.

== People-to-people links ==
Australia's relationship with the Cook Islands focuses on shared membership of regional organisations, trade and investment, people-to-people links and security cooperation. The 2016 census records that a diaspora of at least 22,000 Cook Islands citizens live in Australia, including in Melbourne, Sydney and Perth.

== High-level visits ==
=== High-level visits from Cook Islands to Australia ===
Prime Minister Henry Puna made an official visit to Australia in November 2019.

=== High-level visits from Australia to Cook Islands ===
- Governor-General David Hurley made an official visit to the Cook Islands in June 2023.
- In 7–9 November 2023, Prime Minister Anthony Albanese joined Pacific leaders in the Cook Islands for the 52nd Pacific Islands Forum Leaders' Meeting in Rarotonga.
