= Foreign relations of the Cook Islands =

The Cook Islands maintains diplomatic relations with various countries and is a member of multilateral organisations. While the country is in free association with New Zealand, which can act on the Cook Islands' "delegated authority [...] to assist the Cook Islands" in foreign affairs, the Cook Islands nevertheless enters into treaty obligations and otherwise "interacts with the international community as a sovereign and independent state."

== History ==
In the 1980s the Cook Islands became a member of several United Nations specialized agencies: the World Health Organization in 1984, the Food and Agriculture Organization and UNESCO in 1985, and the International Civil Aviation Organization in 1986. The Repertory of Practice of United Nations Organs records that in 1988 New Zealand declared "that its future participation in international agreements would no longer extend to the Cook Islands..." In 1991 the Cook Islands became a full member of the United Nations Conference on Environment and Development (UNCED) Preparatory Committee and the Intergovernmental Negotiating Committee for a Framework Convention on Climate Change (INC), which the Repertory of Practice describes as "further evidence that the international community had accepted the Cook Islands as a “State” under international law." The United Nations Secretariat therefore "recognized the full treaty-making capacity of the Cook Islands" in 1992 and the Secretary-General, in his capacity as the depository of multilateral treaties, decided that the Cook Islands could participate in treaties that were open to "all states".

== Diplomatic relations ==
List of countries with which the Cook Islands maintains diplomatic relations:

#	Country	Date
1	Norway	18 July 1991
2	Malaysia	2 May 1992
3	New Zealand	1993
4	Australia	1994
5	Nauru	1994
6	Portugal	12 August 1995
7	Papua New Guinea	1995
8	South Africa	9 February 1996
9	Iran	1996
10	China	25 July 1997
11	Spain	29 January 1998
12	India	May 1998
13	Fiji	14 July 1998
—	Holy See	29 April 1999
14	France	19 October 1999
15	Germany	11 September 2001
16	Cuba	2 September 2002
17	Timor-Leste	2002
18	Jamaica	14 May 2003
19	Italy	9 October 2003
20	Belgium	6 April 2005
21	Thailand	24 May 2005
22	Israel	April 2008
23	Czech Republic	12 May 2008
24	Turkey	20 October 2008
25	Switzerland	7 March 2011
26	Japan	16 June 2011
27	Netherlands	16 August 2011
28	Philippines	12 December 2011
29	Singapore	6 August 2012
30	South Korea	22 February 2013
31	Samoa	30 August 2013
32	Tuvalu	August 2013
33	Solomon Islands	1 September 2013
34	Kiribati	3 September 2013
35	Marshall Islands	3 September 2013
36	Palau	3 September 2013
—	Niue	2013
37	Vanuatu	2013
38	Federated States of Micronesia	24 September 2014
39	Tonga	18 November 2014
—	Kosovo	28 May 2015
40	Brazil	21 August 2015
41	Chile	3 August 2016
42	Peru	September 2017
43	Malta	6 October 2017
44	Iceland	13 October 2017
45	Antigua and Barbuda	9 November 2017
46	United Arab Emirates	5 August 2018
47	Estonia	25 August 2018
48	Hungary	20 September 2018
49	Greece	20 October 2018
50	Indonesia	12 July 2019
51	Kuwait	8 December 2021
52	Vietnam	26 April 2022
53	Ireland	21 November 2022
54	Saudi Arabia	11 April 2023
55	Canada	20 May 2023
56	United States	25 September 2023
57	Ghana	8 November 2023
58	Mexico	21 November 2023
59	Panama	8 March 2024
60	Bangladesh	11 April 2024
61	Ecuador	21 May 2024
62	Seychelles	31 May 2024
63	Poland	20 March 2025
64	Azerbaijan	7 April 2025
65	Cambodia	14 May 2025

== Bilateral relations ==
=== Americas ===
Country	Formal Relations Began	Notes
United States	2023	Main article: Cook Islands–United States relations The Cook Islands signed the Cook Islands–United States Maritime Boundary Treaty in 1980. The US established diplomatic relations with the Cook Islands in 25 September 2023.

=== Asia ===
Country	Formal Relations Began	Notes
China	1997	Main article: China–Cook Islands relations The Chinese Embassy to New Zealand in Wellington is also accredited to the Cook Islands.
India	1998	Main article: Cook Islands–India relations: The Indian High Commission in Suva, Fiji is accredited to the Cook Islands.

=== Europe ===
Country	Formal Relations Began	Notes
United Kingdom	N/A	Cook Islander Prime Minister Mark Brown with British Foreign Secretary James Cleverly at a United Nations General Assembly in New York City, September 2023. The Cook Islands has not established diplomatic relations with the United Kingdom; the UK does not recognise the Cook Islands to be a sovereign nation.: The Cook Islands does not maintain an embassy in the United Kingdom.; The United Kingdom is not accredited to the Cook Islands through an embassy; the UK develops relations through its high commission in Wellington, New Zealand.; The UK governed the Cook Islands from 1888 to 1901, when the Cook Islands were transferred to New Zealand. Both countries share common membership of the World Health Organization.

=== Oceania ===
Country	Formal Relations Began	Notes
Australia	1994	See Australia–Cook Islands relations: Australia and the Cook Islands established diplomatic relations in 1994, with the Australian High Commissioner resident in Wellington, New Zealand.; Australia has a high commission in Rarotonga, opened in December 2019. For a detailed history of Australian accreditation to the Cook Islands see List of high commissioners of Australia to the Cook Islands.; Although the Cook Islands maintained a resident high commission in Canberra for some years in the 1990s, at present it has no diplomatic representation to Australia.; Australia's relationship with the Cook Islands focuses on shared membership of regional organisations, trade and investment, people-to-people links and security cooperation. The 2016 census records that a diaspora of at least 22,000 Cook Islands citizens live in Australia, including in Melbourne, Sydney and Perth.; There have been regular exchanges of ministerial visits. Prime Minister Henry Puna made an official visit to Australia in November 2019. Governor-General David Hurley made an official visit to the Cook Islands in June 2023.
New Zealand	1993	Main article: Cook Islands–New Zealand relations: The Cook Islands maintains a High Commission in Wellington and a Consul-General in Auckland.; New Zealand maintains a High Commission in Rarotonga.

== Consular relations ==
The following countries have established consular relations with the Cook Islands only.

- Monaco 2007 or before (Note: Cook Islands Honorary Consul is appointed to and acknowledged in Monaco since 2007 or before.)

== International organisation participation ==
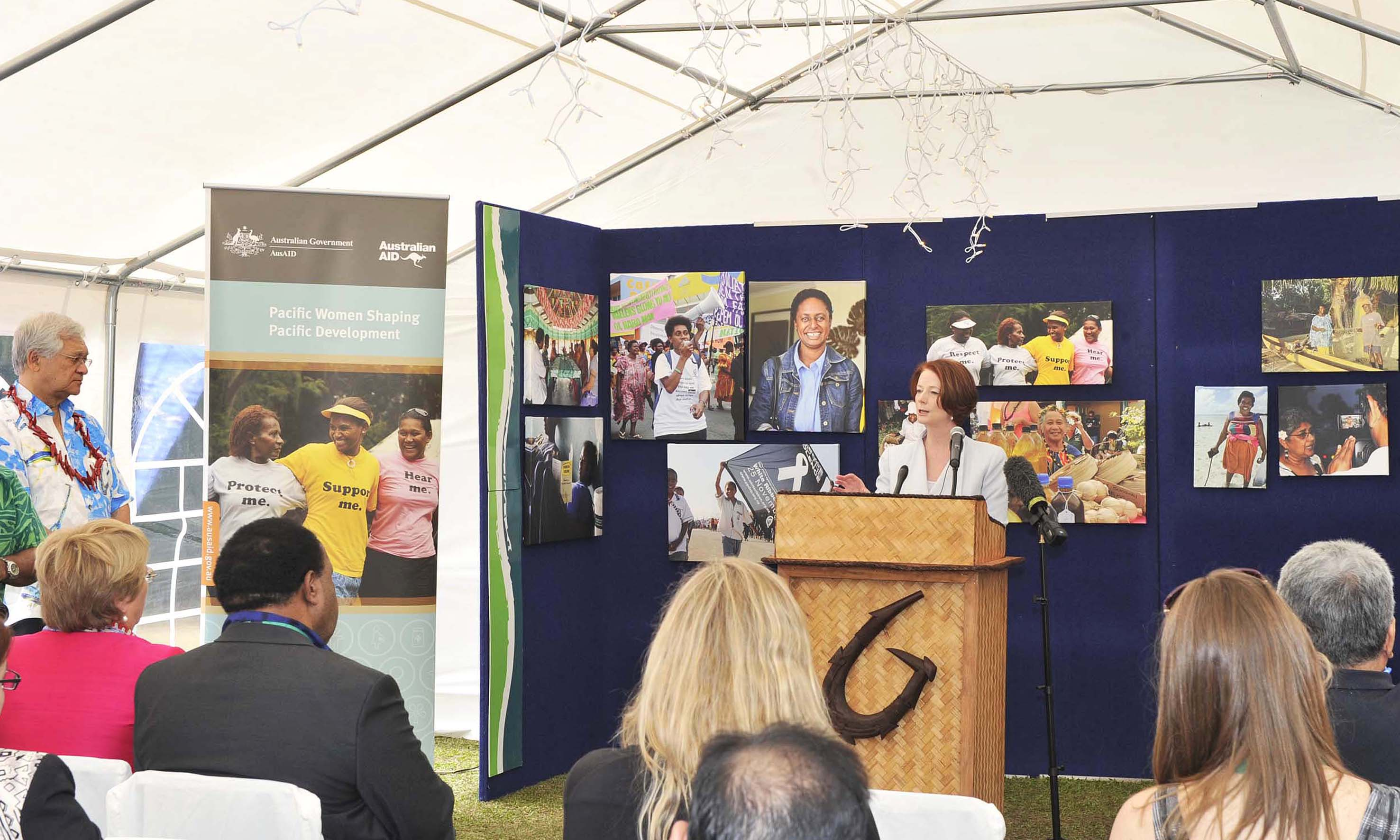
43rd Pacific Islands Forum, in the Cook Islands, 28.8.-1.9.2012

- ACP, AOSIS, AsDB, ESCAP (associate), FAO, ICAO, IMO, ICC, ICFTU, IFAD, ILO IOC, OPCW, Pacific Islands Forum, Red Cross/Red Crescent, South Pacific Applied Geoscience Commission, Sparteca, SPC, UNESCO, WHO, WMO
- Commonwealth of Nations – the Cook Islands are part of the Commonwealth, but is not a member state, being a dependency of New Zealand, whose Commonwealth membership covers the Cook Islands, Niue, and Tokelau, as well as New Zealand itself.
- In November 2011, the Cook Islands were one of the eight founding members of Polynesian Leaders Group, a regional grouping intended to cooperate on a variety of issues including culture and language, education, responses to climate change, and trade and investment.
- The Cook Islands participate in the International Maritime Organization, the United Nations regulatory body for the shipping trade.

== Participation in international treaties and conventions ==
- Party to the following treaties and conventions: Biodiversity Convention, Cotonou Agreement, Geneva Conventions, POPs Project, United Nations Convention to Combat Desertification, UNCLOS, UNFCCC and its Kyoto Protocol, Convention on the Recognition and Enforcement of Foreign Arbitral Awards, Comprehensive Nuclear-Test-Ban Treaty, (Note: including the Facility Agreement with the Comprehensive Nuclear-Test-Ban Treaty Organization.) International Code of Conduct against Ballistic Missile Proliferation, Biological Weapons Convention, Convention of the International Mobile Satellite Organization

== See also ==
- List of diplomatic missions of the Cook Islands
- List of diplomatic missions in the Cook Islands
- Foreign relations of Niue
- Foreign relations of New Zealand
- Politics of the Cook Islands
