= List of diplomatic missions of Niue =

Map of diplomatic missions of Niue Niue States hosting embassy of Niue

This is a list of diplomatic missions of Niue, a small Pacific island country in Oceania. Although Niue is an associated state of New Zealand, it maintains diplomatic relations with 27 states.

While Niue has self-rule, New Zealand manages its defence and foreign affairs at its request. Niue is classified as "Non-member State" by the UN and since 1994, after receiving declaration by New Zealand and the gradual evolution of Niue responsibility for its own foreign affairs, the UN Secretariat recognised the full treaty-making capacity of Niue and it signs treaties in its own name. It has overseas diplomatic mission (high commission) in New Zealand. Due to the nature of the relationship with Niue, in 2001 in New Zealand a special law was passed to codify the diplomatic immunities enjoyed by the Niuean High Commission and its staff. Niue has also permanent mission to the European Communities (in Brussels) and permanent delegation to UNESCO. Mission in Brussels was established after Niue, in 2000, signed the Cotonou Convention between the member states of the European Union and the Africa-Caribbean-Pacific (ACP) Group of States.

== Europe ==
- Belgium (Embassy)

== Oceania ==
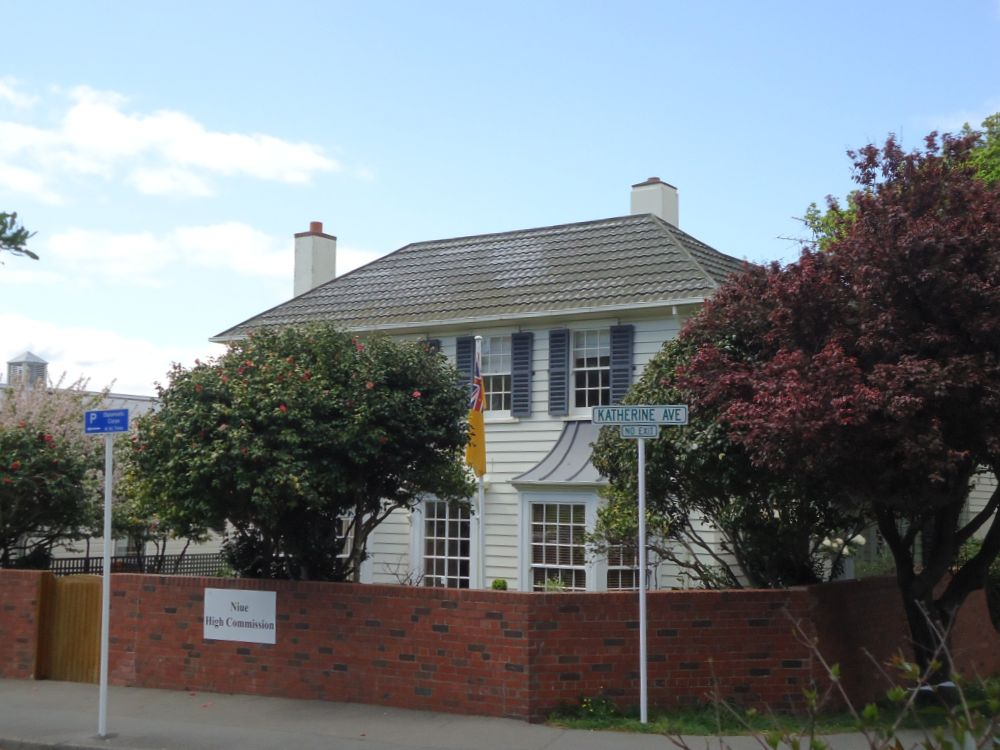
Niuean High Commission in Wellington

- New Zealand
  - Wellington (High Commission)

== Asia ==
- Japan
  - Tokyo (Honorary Consulate)

== Multilateral organisations ==
- Brussels (Permanent Mission to the European Union)
- Paris (Permanent Delegation to UNESCO)

== See also ==
- Foreign relations of Niue
- List of diplomatic missions in Niue
