= Cook Islands–India relations =

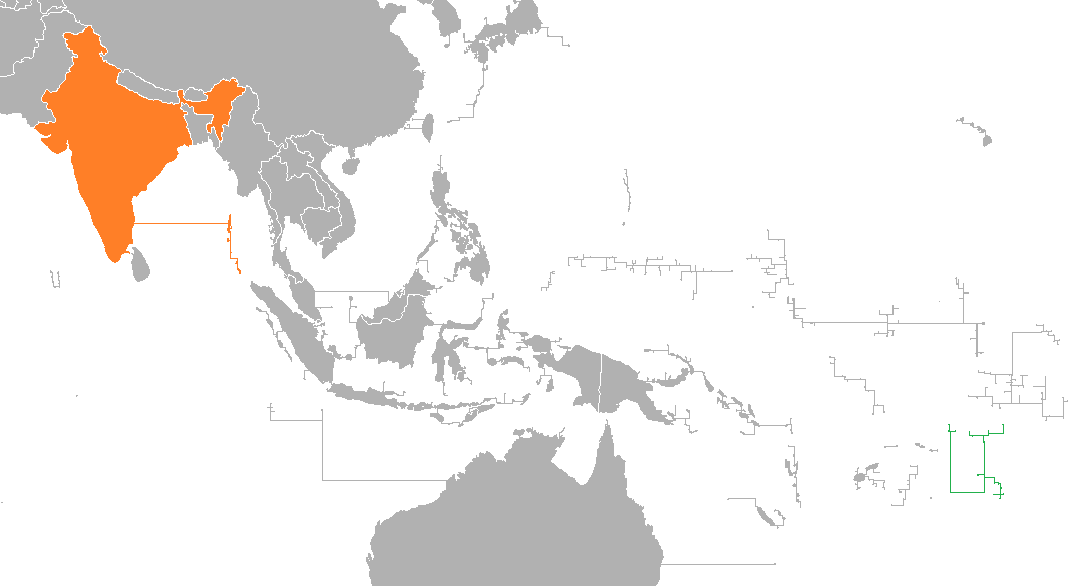

- Cook Islands: India

Cook Islands–India relations are the bilateral relations between the Cook Islands and India.

== History ==
Diplomatic relations between the Cook Islands and India were established in 1998. The High Commission of India in Wellington, New Zealand was originally concurrently accredited to the Cook Islands until March 1999, when it was transferred to the High Commission of India in Suva, Fiji.

Minister of State for External Affairs E. Ahamed led an Indian delegation to attend the Post Forum Dialogue Partners Meeting held in the Cook Islands on 24–31 August 2012. Apart from meeting with the heads of other delegations, Ahamed also held bilateral discussions with the Health Minister of the Cook Islands. Finance Minister Mark Brown visited Delhi to participate in the ADB Asia Leadership Program on Sustainable Development and Climate Change on 2–4 February 2013. Associate Minister in the Ministry of Internal Affairs John Henry visited New Delhi to participate in the Second High Level Meeting on South-South Cooperation for Child Rights in Asia and the Pacific in October 2013. The Indian High Commissioner to the Cook Islands (resident in Suva) represented India at the Third Round Table Meeting of Development Partners in Rarotonga on 12 February 2013. The High Commissioner also represented India at the Development Partners Meeting in the Cook Islands in February 2014.

The Cook Islands is a member of the Pacific Islands Forum, of which India is an official dialogue partner. Bilateral relations received a boost following the initiation of the Forum for India–Pacific Islands Cooperation (FIPIC) by the Narendra Modi government in 2014. A Cook Islander delegation including Prime Minister Henry Puna, his wife Akaiti Puna, his Chief of Staff Elizabeth Wright Koteka and other senior officials attended the first India-Forum for Pacific Island Countries (FIPIC) Summit hosted in Suva, Fiji on 19 November 2014 by Prime Minister Modi. Puna stated that he was pleased to see India's interest in boosting ties with the Pacific Island countries and that India's economic growth provided many opportunities for the island nations. Puna told The Fiji Sun, "It is a major player in the world economy and therefore we need to have a close relationship with India."

Minister of Health, Justice & Parliamentary Services Nandi Glassie led a Cook Islander delegation to attend the 2nd FIPIC Summit held in Jaipur on 21 August 2015. Glassie stated that India was a "pioneer investor" in ocean mineral resource exploration, and that the Cook Islands wished to co-operate with the country in the fields of seabed exploration and mining.

== Trade ==
Bilateral trade between the Cook Islands and India totaled US$320,000 in 2014–15. India made no imports from the Cook Islands, and the entire value of trade is India's exports to the country. The main commodities exported from India to the Cook Islands are natural or cultured pearls, precious and semi-precious stones, imitation jewellery, coins, electrical machinery and equipment, and textile articles.

At the 2nd FIPIC Summit, Prime Minister Modi announced that a FIPIC Trade Office would be opened at the FICCI premises in New Delhi. The trade office, named the FIPIC Business Accelerator, was officially opened on 7 September 2015. The Confederation of Indian Industries (CII) has also established a dedicated department at its headquarters in New Delhi focusing on boosting trade with Pacific Island Countries.

== Cultural relations ==
An Indian residing in the United States established the St. Mary's Medical College in the Cook Islands in the 1990s. The College initially attracted many overseas students, but eventually closed several years later. The same person subsequently founded the South Seas University. However, the college only held one graduation ceremony before shutting down.

According to a 2006 national population estimate of the Cook Islands, there were around 100 people of Indian origin residing in the Cook Islands, almost all of whom were Indo-Fijians. There are also a small number of Indian citizens working as professionals in the country.

== Foreign aid ==
India provided $50,000 to help fund various small projects in the Cook Islands in 2005. India provided funds to procure a specialized vehicle for disabled persons in August 2012, for 16 community development projects in February 2013, to procure cricket equipment for domestic tournament in February 2014, and for 10 projects in January 2015.

India announced that it would provide a grant-in-aid of US$100,000 annually to each of the 14 Pacific Island countries, including the Cook Islands, at the Post Forum Dialogue partner meeting in 2006. The amount was increased to US$125,000 annually from 2009. The funding was used for project such as purchasing furniture and equipment for educational institutions, procuring audit software for the audit office, procuring computers and accessories for the Ministry of Foreign Affairs & Immigration and the Ministry of Finance & Economic Management, upgrading of the fishing tools of Cook Islander villagers and building public utilities. At the first FIPIC Summit on 19 November 2014, Prime Minister Modi announced numerous steps that India would take to improve relations with Pacific Island countries, including the Cook Islands, such as easing visa policies, increase in grant-in-aid to Pacific Island Countries to $200,000 each annually, and several measures to boost bilateral trade and aid in the development of the Pacific Island countries.

The Indian High Commissioner officially transferred $966,000 grant-in-aid to the Cook Islands at a ceremony attended by Prime Minister Puna and Finance Minister Mark Brown and other government officials on 1 March 2017. This was the single largest grant provided by India to the Cook Islands. Brown stated that the funds would be used to execute 16 community projects including agriculture, education, non-government organisations and persons with disabilities. Brown added, "These are the types of grants that are very, very effective. They are using government systems to channel these funds directly to the recipients and they are the ones that put them to the best use."

Citizens of the Cook Islands are eligible for scholarships under the Indian Technical and Economic Cooperation Programme. Cook Islanders attended the Sustainable Development organized by the Indian High Commission in Fiji and TERI for all Pacific Island countries in Suva in March 2007. Cook Islander diplomats have attended special training courses for diplomats from Pacific Island Countries organized by the Foreign Service Institute and held in Nadi, Fiji.
