= List of diplomatic missions of the Cook Islands =

Map of diplomatic missions of the Cook Islands Cook Islands Cook Islands embassy Cook Islands embassy, non-resident

This article lists the diplomatic missions of the Cook Islands. The Cook Islands is a self governing state in free association with New Zealand, it maintains diplomatic relations with 66 states.

The Cook Islands has three diplomatic missions abroad (a High Commission in Wellington, a Consulate in Auckland, and a High Commission in Suva, Fiji. It has previously had a High Commission in Canberra and an embassy in Brussels. The High Commission to New Zealand has multiple accreditations. (Note: The High Commission in New Zealand is also accredited to Papua New Guinea.) The Cook Islands also has a number of honorary consulates (Note: There are honorary consuls based in Monaco, Oslo (Norway) and Istanbul (Turkey).) and former honorary consulates. (Note: in Honolulu and Los Angeles, both in the United States.)

== Oceania ==
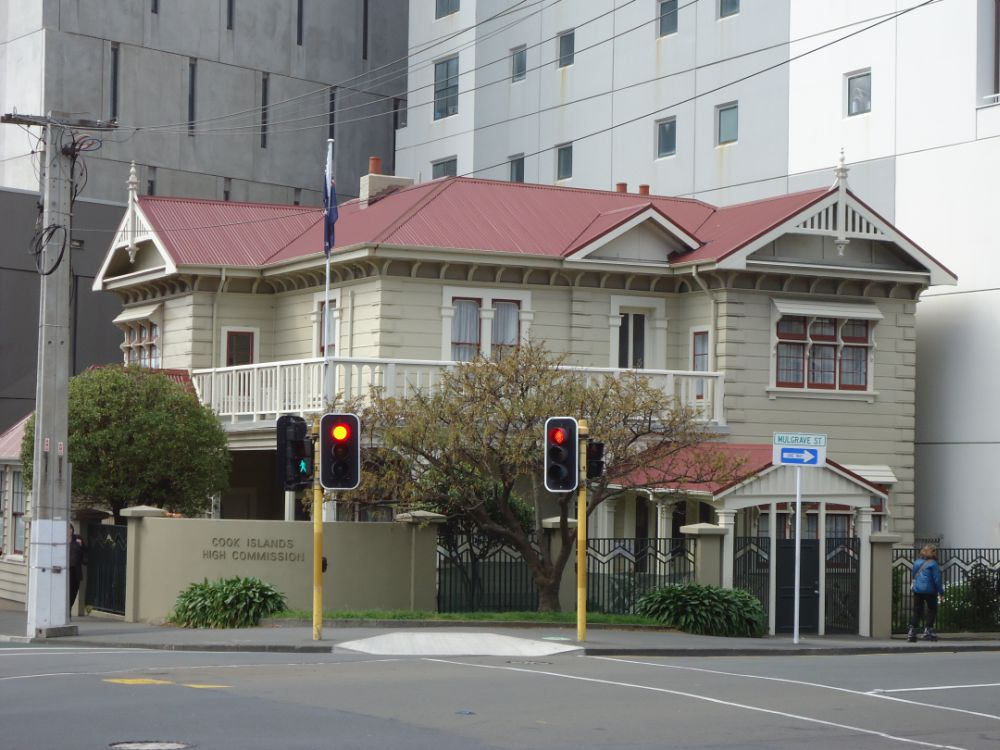
Cook Islands High Commission in Wellington

- Wellington (High Commission)
- Auckland (Consulate-General)
- Suva (High Commission)

== Multilateral organizations ==
- Lancaster (Permanent Mission to the International Maritime Organization)
- Thoiry (Permanent Delegation to UNESCO)
- Avarua (Non-Resident Mission to the European Union)

== See also ==
- Foreign relations of the Cook Islands
- List of diplomatic missions in the Cook Islands
