= List of diplomatic missions in the Cook Islands =

This is a list of diplomatic missions in the Cook Islands. Although the Cook Islands is an associated state of New Zealand, it maintains diplomatic relations with 66 states. At present, the capital of Avarua hosts two missions. Additionally, there are embassies accredited to the Cook Islands and residing outside the country. They are in Canberra, Suva and Wellington.

Map of diplomatic missions in the Cook Islands Cook Islands States with embassy in the Cook Islands States with non-resident embassy to the Cook Islands

== High Commissions ==
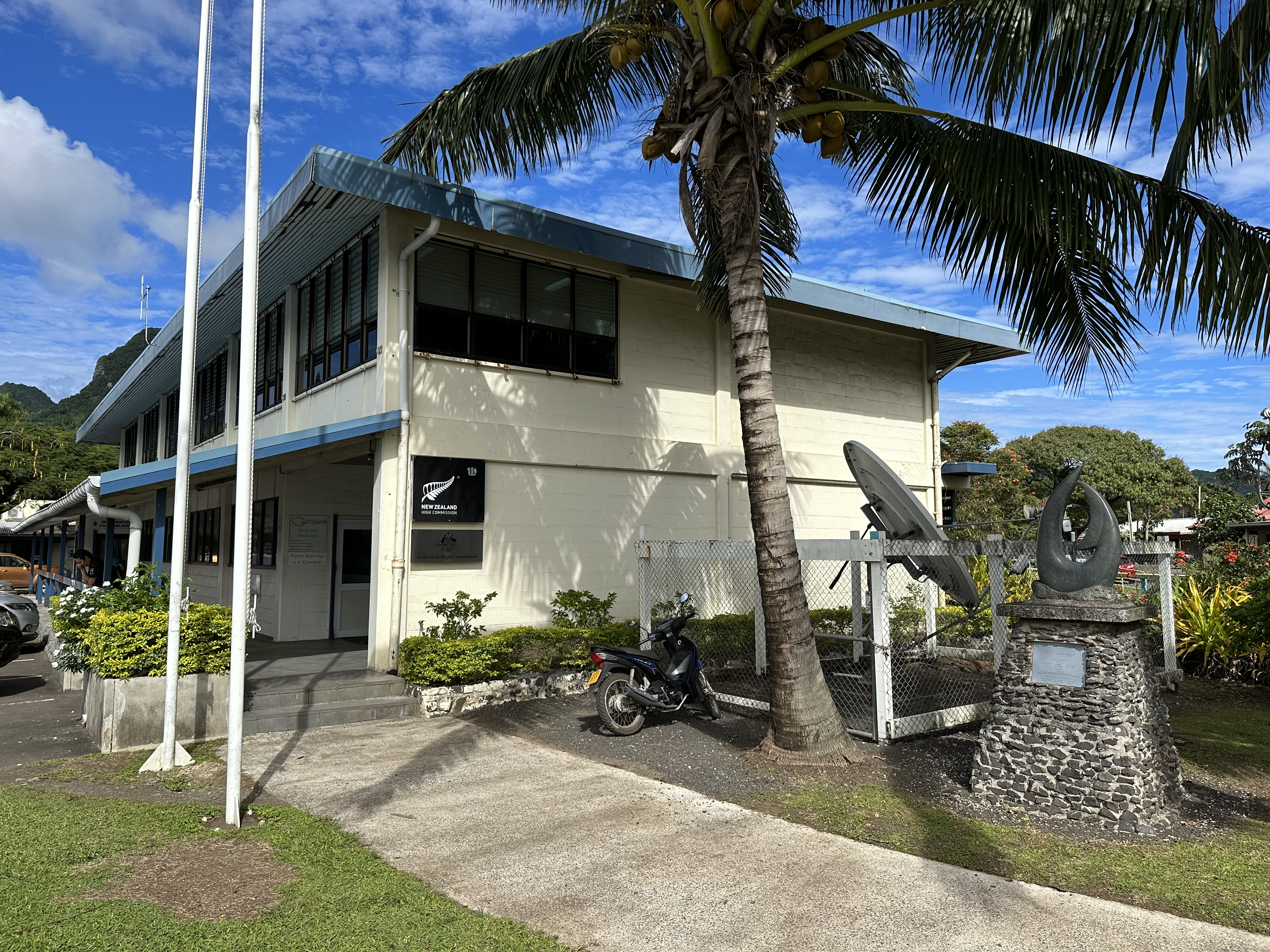
High Commissions of Australia and New Zealand in Avarua

=== Avarua ===
1. Australia (High Commission)
2. New Zealand (High Commission)

== Non-resident embassies ==
- Belgium (Canberra)
- Canada (Wellington)
- Chile (Wellington)
- China (Wellington)
- Cuba (Wellington)
- Czech Republic (Canberra)
- Fiji (Suva)
- France (Wellington)
- Germany (Wellington)
- Holy See (Wellington)
- India (Suva) (Note: India is the only state which has accredited separate embassies to the Cook Islands and to Niue (the Indian embassy to Niue is based in Wellington).)
- Indonesia (Wellington)
- Israel (Wellington)
- Italy (Wellington)
- Japan (Wellington)
- Malaysia (Wellington)
- Netherlands (Wellington)
- Norway (Canberra)
- Palestine (Canberra)
- Philippines (Wellington)
- Portugal (Canberra)
- South Africa (Canberra)
- South Korea (Wellington)
- Spain (Wellington)
- Switzerland (Wellington)
- Turkey (Wellington)

== Honorary consulates ==
- France
- Germany
- Japan
- Spain

== See also ==
- Foreign relations of the Cook Islands
- List of diplomatic missions of the Cook Islands
