= List of diplomatic missions in Niue =

Map of diplomatic missions in Niue Niue States with embassy in Niue States with non-resident embassy to Niue

This is a list of diplomatic missions in Niue, a small Pacific island country in Oceania. Although Niue is an associated state of New Zealand, it maintains diplomatic relations with 27 states. At present, the capital of Alofi hosts two missions. Additionally there are embassies accredited to Niue and residing outside the country. (Note: There is also non-resident delegation of European Union to Niue, based in Suva.)

== High Commissions ==
=== In Alofi ===
1. Australia
2. New Zealand

== Non-resident embassies ==
- China (Wellington)
- Fiji (Suva)
- France (Wellington)
- India (Wellington)
- Indonesia (Wellington)
- Israel (Wellington)
- Japan (Wellington)
- Malaysia (Wellington)
- Papua New Guinea (Wellington)
- Turkey (Wellington)

== See also ==
- Foreign relations of Niue
- List of diplomatic missions of Niue
