= United States–Pacific Island Country Summit =

Summit hosted by the United States with 12 Pacific island country leaders

US–Pacific Island Country Summit
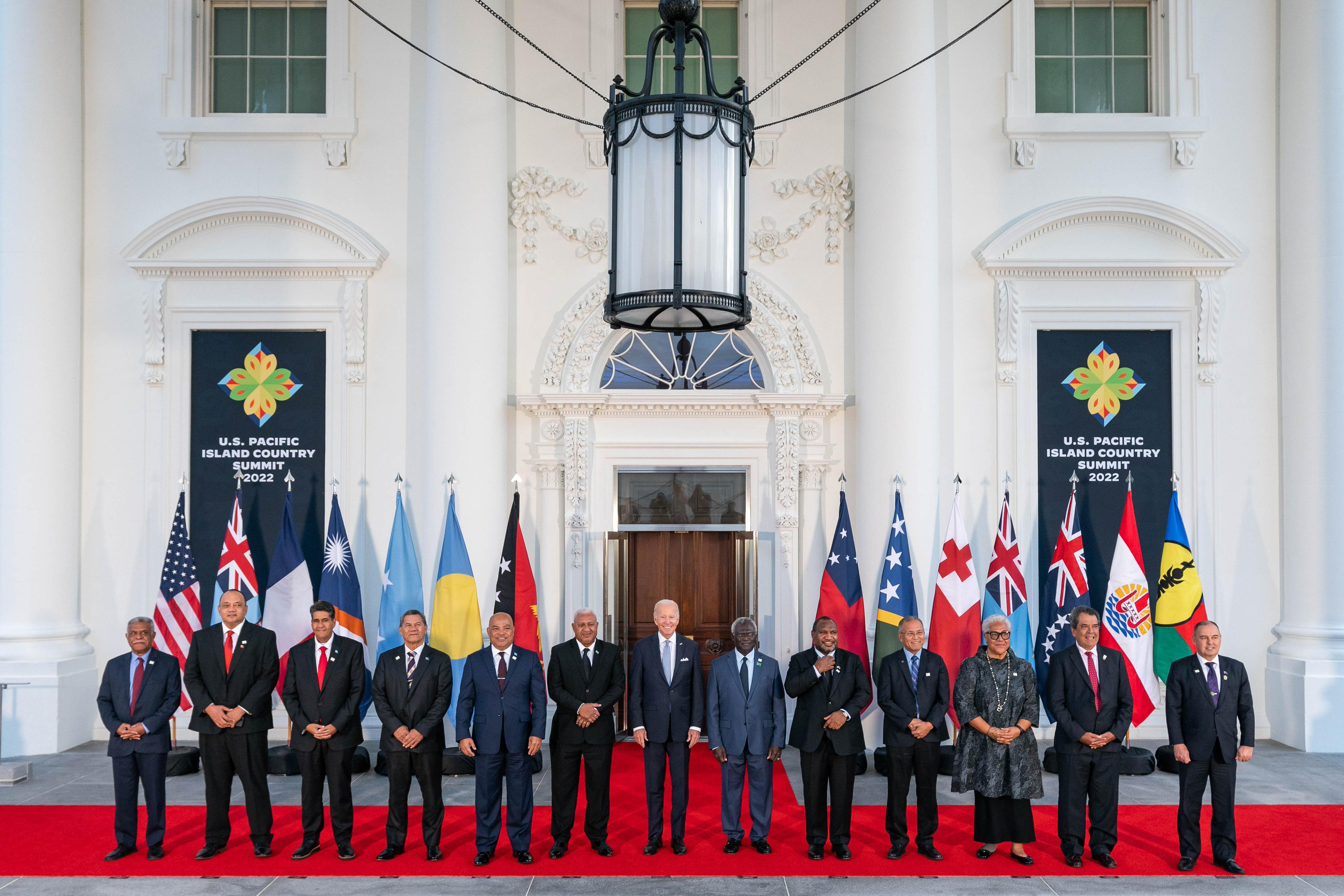
- Host country: United States
- Date: September 28–29, 2022
- Cities: Washington, D.C.
- Venues: White House
- Participants: 15 countries: French Polynesia; Fiji; Kiribati; Marshall Islands; Micronesia; Nauru; New Caledonia; Palau; Papua New Guinea; Samoa; Solomon Islands; Tonga; Tuvalu; United States (hosts); Vanuatu

The United States–Pacific Island Country Summit was a meeting hosted by President of the United States Joe Biden with Pacific Island leaders held on September 28–29, 2022 at the White House in Washington, D.C., which coincided with the week of the 77th session of the United Nations General Assembly.

== Background ==
The summit was announced by Kurt Campbell on August 6, 2022, and confirmed by United States Deputy Secretary of State Wendy Sherman who was at Tonga at the time. The United States which previously addressed the 51st Pacific Islands Forum in July 2022 announced that it will open a series of new diplomatic missions to counter China's growing presence in the Pacific region. On September 2, 2022, the White House released a statement confirming that the summit will be held from September 28 to 29, 2022.

== Summit ==
=== September 28, 2022 ===
The Pacific leaders endorsed the declaration of the United States–Pacific partnership that commits the United States and the Pacific Island countries to work together "in the face of a worsening climate crisis and an increasingly complex geopolitical environment". The partnership also includes the prospect of "big dollar" aid to the Pacific region which includes more than $860 million in expanded programs.

=== September 29, 2022 ===
The summit participants released a declaration making 11 commitments

1. Resolution to strengthen partnership
2. Commitment to bolstering Pacific regionalism
3. Commitment to tackling the climate crisis
4. Commitment to enhancing cooperation to advance economic growth and sustainable development in the Pacific
5. Commitment to supporting each other in preparation and response to natural disasters
6. Resolution to protect the Blue Pacific and enhance the laws that govern it
7. Resolution to maintain peace and security across the Pacific continent
8. Commitment to continue cooperating in addressing COVID-19 and other health-related issues
9. Commitment to expanding opportunities for citizens of participating countries
10. Commitment to address legacies of conflict and promotion of nuclear nonproliferation
11. Commitment to future implementation of the partnership

== Participants ==
The White House invited 12 Pacific island countries including Solomon Islands which previously signed a security agreement with China in April 2022. Ten countries sent their leaders while Nauru and Vanuatu sent their representatives. The leaders of French Polynesia and New Caledonia also attended the event.

=== Participating countries ===
- Fiji
- Kiribati
- Marshall Islands
- Micronesia
- Nauru
- Palau
- Papua New Guinea
- Samoa
- Solomon Islands
- Tonga
- Tuvalu
- United States (hosts)
- Vanuatu

=== Observers ===
- Australia
- New Zealand
- Pacific Islands Forum

=== Attendees ===
- Prime Minister Mark Brown of the Cook Islands
- Prime Minister Josaia Voreqe Bainimarama of the Republic of Fiji
- President Edouard Fritch of the Government of French Polynesia
- President David Kabua of the Republic of the Marshall Islands
- President David W. Panuelo of the Federated States of Micronesia
- Chargé d'Affaires Josie-Ann Dongobir of the Republic of Nauru
- President Louis Mapou of the Government of New Caledonia
- President Surangel S. Whipps Jr. of the Republic of Palau
- Prime Minister James Marape of the Independent State of Papua New Guinea
- Prime Minister Fiamē Naomi Mata’afa of the Independent State of Samoa
- Prime Minister Manasseh Sogavare of Solomon Islands
- Prime Minister Siaosi ‘Ofakivahafolau Sovaleni of the Kingdom of Tonga
- Prime Minister Kausea Natano of Tuvalu
- President Joseph R. Biden Jr. of the United States of America (hosts)
- Ambassador Odo Tevi of the Republic of Vanuatu
