= Cook Islands–United States relations =

- Cook Islands: United States

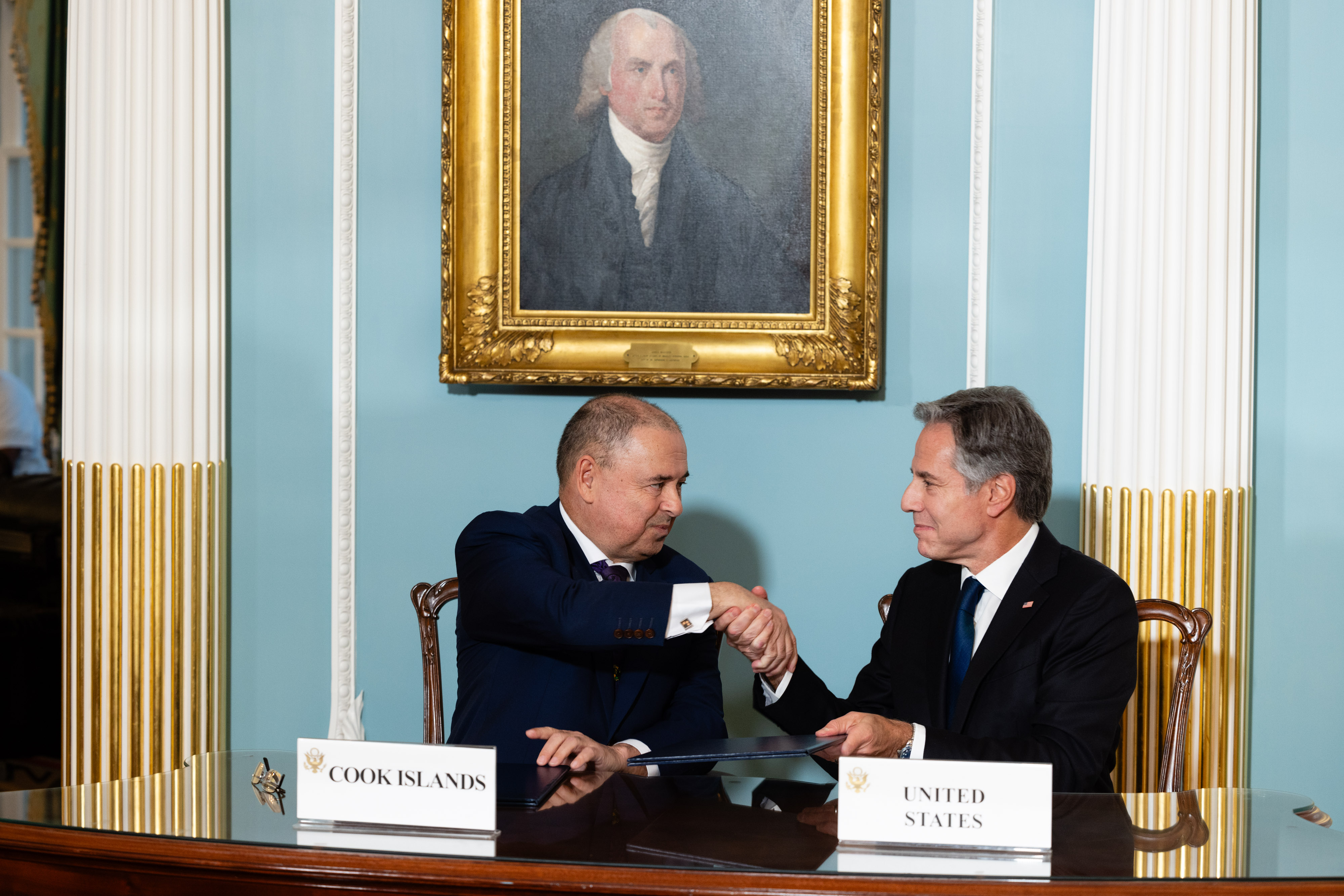
United States Secretary of State Antony Blinken and Prime Minister of the Cook Islands Mark Brown participate in a signing ceremony to establish formal bilateral relations at the State Department in Washington, D.C., September 25, 2023.

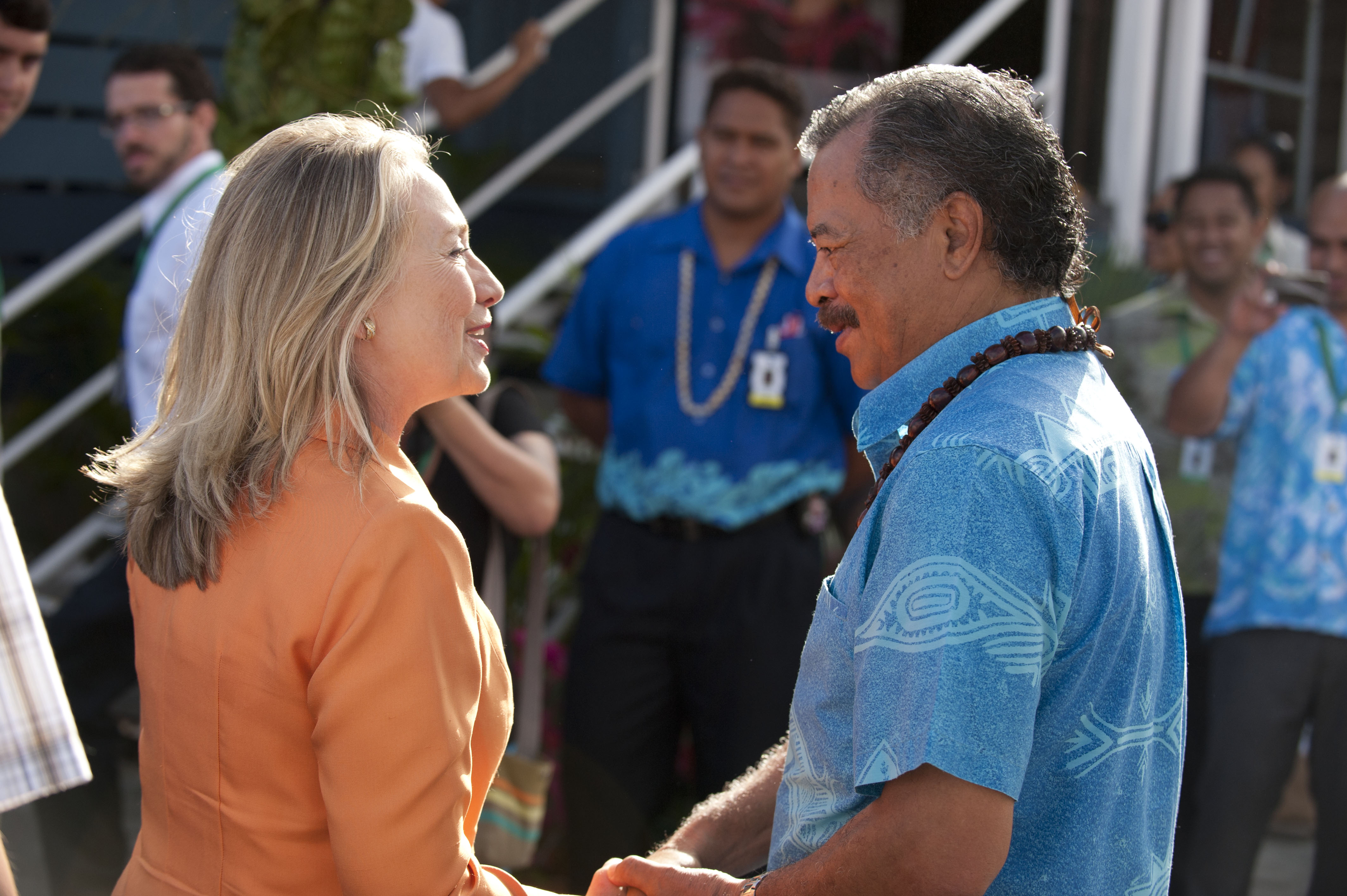
United States Secretary of State Hillary Clinton meets with Prime Minister of the Cook Islands Henry Puna at the Pacific Islands Forum in Rarotonga, the Cook Islands, August 31, 2012.

Cook Islands–United States relations are the bilateral relations between the Cook Islands and the United States. Formal relations were established on 25 September 2023.

== History ==
On 25 September 2023, the United States established diplomatic relations with the Cook Islands.

In early August 2025, the United States Department of State commenced talks on research for seabed exploration and development with the Cook Islands.

On 5 February 2026, the Cooks Islands and United States governments signed a non-binding framework to strengthen supply chains for critical minerals and rare earths. On 1 September 2026, the New Zealand and United States governments signed an agreement during the annual Pacific Islands Forum conference in Palau to jointly fund a project to upgrade the port at Omoka village on Penrhyn Atoll. This agreement was built on the earlier critical minerals framework signed between the Cook Islands and the United States. Under the agreement, the United States would contribute US$50 million to the port while New Zealand would contribute US$10 million. The United States had built Pernhyn's port and airfield during the Second World War to support the movement of American military personnel, supplies and aircraft.

== See also ==
- Cook Islands–United States Maritime Boundary Treaty
- Foreign relations of the Cook Islands
- Foreign relations of the United States
