= List of high commissioners of Australia to the Cook Islands =

High Commissioner of Australia to the Cook Islands

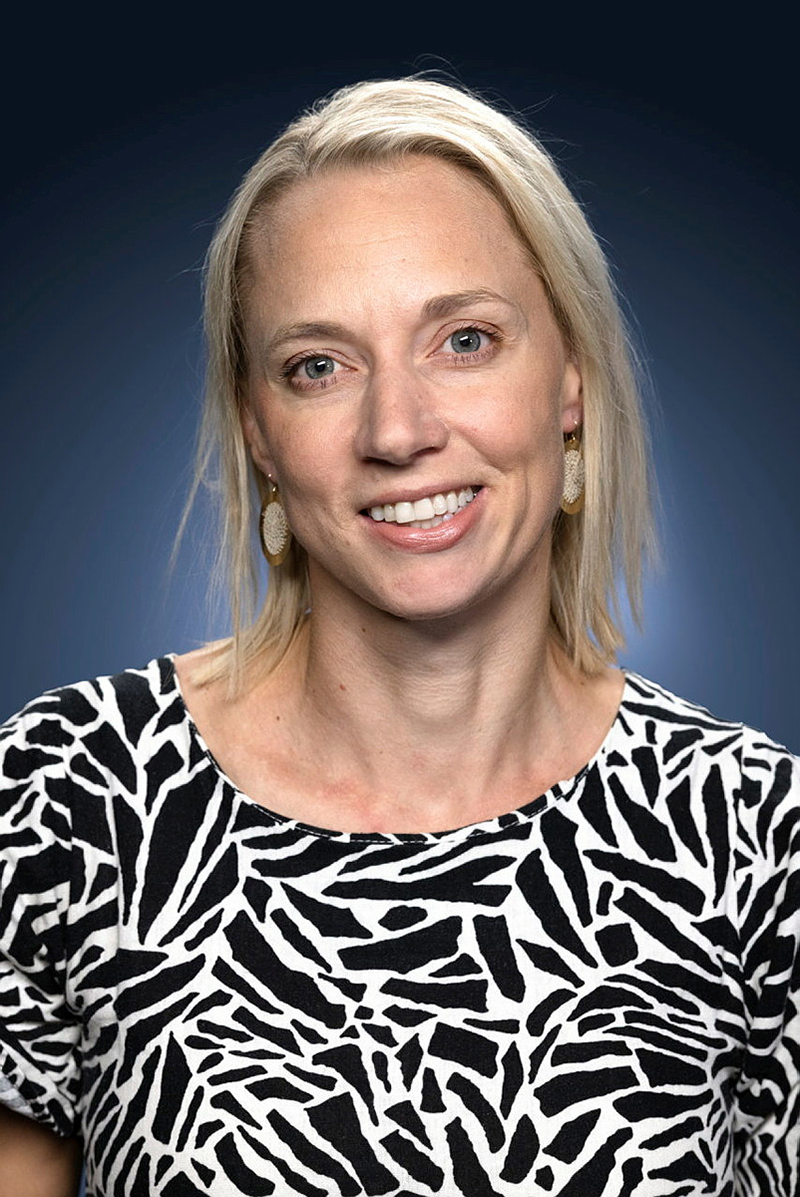
- Incumbent; Susannah Hodson since February 2025
- Department of Foreign Affairs and Trade
- Style: Her Excellency
- Reports to: Minister for Foreign Affairs
- Residence: Avarua, Rarotonga
- Nominator: Prime Minister of Australia
- Appointer: Governor General of Australia
- Inaugural holder: Ray Greet (Non-resident High Commissioner) Christopher Watkins (resident High Commissioner)
- Formation: 1994
- Website: Australian High Commission, Rarotonga

The high commissioner of Australia to the Cook Islands is an officer of the Australian Department of Foreign Affairs and Trade and the head of the High Commission of the Commonwealth of Australia in the Cook Islands. The position has the rank and status of an ambassador extraordinary and plenipotentiary and the high commissioner resides in Rarotonga.

== Posting history ==
In 1994, Australia formally established diplomatic relations with the Cook Islands, a self-governing state since 1974 in free association with New Zealand, with the high commissioner in Wellington also serving as high commissioner to the Cook Islands. In November 2018, Prime Minister Scott Morrison announced an expansion of Australia's diplomatic representation to all members of the Pacific Islands Forum, including opening new high commissions in the Cook Islands, Niue, and Palau. On 18 December 2019, Foreign Minister Marise Payne. announced the establishment of a resident Australian High Commission in the Cook Islands to "help underscore Australia’s focus on deepening engagement across the region." The first resident high commissioner, Christopher Watkins, took up office in Rarotonga on 17 March 2020.

== Heads of mission ==
#	Officeholder	Residency	Term start date	Term end date	Time in office	Notes
1	Ray Greet	Wellington, New Zealand	1994	January 1996	1–2 years	
2	Geoff Miller	Wellington, New Zealand	January 1996	February 2000	4 years, 1 month	
3	Bob Cotton	Wellington, New Zealand	February 2000	July 2003	3 years, 5 months	
4	Allan Hawke	Wellington, New Zealand	July 2003	27 February 2006	2 years, 7 months	
5	John Dauth	Wellington, New Zealand	27 February 2006	September 2008	2 years, 6 months	
−	Frank Ingruber	Wellington, New Zealand	September 2008	May 2009	8 months	
6	Paul O'Sullivan	Wellington, New Zealand	May 2009	July 2012	3 years, 2 months	
7	Michael Potts	Wellington, New Zealand	July 2012	January 2016	3 years, 6 months	
8	Peter Woolcott	Wellington, New Zealand	28 January 2016	1 August 2017	1 year, 185 days	
−	Andrew Cumpston	Wellington, New Zealand	1 August 2017	14 February 2018	197 days	
9	Ewen McDonald	Wellington, New Zealand	14 February 2018	2 March 2019	1 year, 16 days	
10	Patricia Forsythe	Wellington, New Zealand	2 March 2019	17 March 2020	1 year, 15 days	
11	Christopher Watkins	Rarotonga	17 March 2020	August 2022	2 years, 137 days	
–	Ruth Baird (Acting)	Rarotonga	August 2022	March 2023	six months	
12	Phoebe Smith	Rarotonga	March 2023	February 2025		

== See also ==
- Australia–New Zealand relations
- Foreign relations of the Cook Islands
- Foreign relations of Australia
