= India–Niue relations =

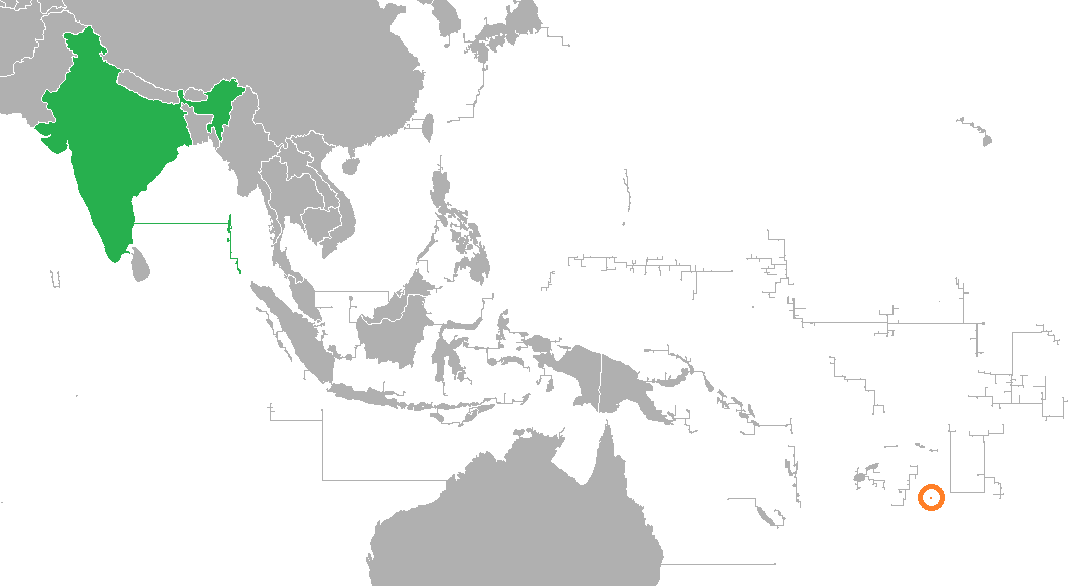

- India: Niue

India–Niue relations are the bilateral relations between India and Niue.

== History ==
Diplomatic relations between India and Niue were established on 30 August 2010, when Minister of State for External Affairs E. Ahamed and Niue Premier Toke Talagi signed a Joint Communique formalizing relations on the sidelines of the Pacific Islands Forum (PIF) in the Cook Islands. India was the sixth nation to establish relations with Niue. The High Commission of India in Wellington, New Zealand is concurrently accredited to Niue. The High Commission was also concurrently accredited to the Cook Islands until March 1999, when it was transferred to the High Commission of India in Suva, Fiji. As a result, India is the only nation to have accredited Cook Islands and Niue to different diplomatic missions.

Associate Minister in the Ministry of Health Dalton Emani Makamau Tagelagi visited New Delhi to participate in the Second High Level Meeting on South-South Cooperation for Child Rights in Asia and the Pacific in October 2013.

Niue is a member of the PIF, of which India is an official dialogue partner. Bilateral relations received a boost following the initiation of the Forum for India–Pacific Islands Cooperation (FIPIC) by the Narendra Modi government in 2014. A Niuean delegation including Premier Toke Talagi and other senior officials attended the first India-Forum for Pacific Island Countries (FIPIC) Summit hosted in Suva, Fiji on 19 November 2014 by Prime Minister Modi.

Premier Toke Talagi led a Niuean delegation to attend the 2nd FIPIC Summit held in Jaipur on 21 August 2015.

== Trade ==
Bilateral trade between India and Niue is limited. In 2014–15, India imported $20,000 worth of machinery and mechanical appliance parts from Niue but made no exports to the country. In 2015–16, India exported US$40,000 worth of leather products such as handbags and saddlery to Niue and made no imports.

At the 2nd FIPIC Summit, Prime Minister Modi announced that a FIPIC Trade Office would be opened at the FICCI premises in New Delhi. The trade office, named the FIPIC Business Accelerator, was officially opened on 7 September 2015. The Confederation of Indian Industries (CII) has also established a dedicated department at its headquarters in New Delhi focusing on boosting trade with Pacific Island Countries.

== Cultural relations ==
Niue began permitting the immigration of limited numbers of Indian workers, as well as Indonesians and Filipinos, in 2006, to replace the shortage of labour caused by the emigration of Niueans to New Zealand and Australia. In that year, 20 Indian Sikhs moved to Niue to work for an Indo-Niuean joint venture company that grows vanilla and noni (Morinda citrifolia). There is also a small Indian community of professionals in Niue.

Some Indian students enrolled at the Lord Liverpool University in Niue, which had been established by a Korean American. However, the university shut down shortly after its opening.

== Foreign aid ==
India announced that it would provide a grant-in-aid of US$100,000 annually to each of the 14 Pacific Island countries, including Niue, at the Post Forum Dialogue partner meeting in 2006. The amount was increased to US$125,000 annually from 2009. The funding was used for project such as purchasing furniture and equipment for educational institutions, procuring audit software for the audit office, procuring computers and accessories for the Ministry of Foreign Affairs & Immigration and the Ministry of Finance & Economic Management, upgrading of the fishing tools of Cook Islander villagers and building public utilities. At the first FIPIC Summit on 19 November 2014, Prime Minister Modi announced numerous steps that India would take to improve relations with Pacific Island countries, including the Cook Islands, such as easing visa policies, increase in grant-in-aid to Pacific Island Countries to $200,000 each annually, and several measures to boost bilateral trade and aid in the development of the Pacific Island countries.

Citizens of Niue are eligible for scholarships under the Indian Technical and Economic Cooperation Programme.
