= Elizabeth Wright-Koteka =

Cook Islands diplomat

Elizabeth Foster Wright-Koteka
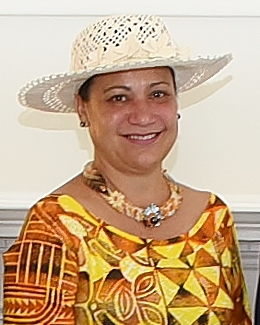
- in 2019
- Education: Victoria University of Wellington
- Occupation: diplomat
- Known for: High Commissioner to New Zealand

Elizabeth Foster Wright-Koteka is a diplomat from the Cook Islands who represented her country in New Zealand.

== Life ==
Elizabeth's father was Australian and her mother was from the island of Pukapuka. That island has had a population of less than a thousand since 1904. She went to the Victoria University of Wellington and graduated in 1991. In the following year she joined her county's foreign ministry. She can speak several of the island dialects of Maori as well as English, Rarotongan Māori and the language of Pukapukan. She argues that her country's language is important for its cultural identity.

She worked in the prime minister Henry Puna's office as chief of staff and for two years she was the energy commissioner. A delegation including prime minister, his wife Akaiti Puna, and her as his chief of staff attended the first India-Forum for Pacific Island Countries (FIPIC) Summit in Suva, Fiji, in November 2014 hosted by Prime Minister Modi.

She was her country's high commissioner to New Zealand from 2018 where the majority of people from Cook Islands now live. In 2019 she presented her credentials. She has spoken up for the languages of the Pacific. There are about sixty thousand Cook Islanders in New Zealand but only about 12% speak a language of their heritage. She argued that the younger generation should take an interest and that eventually all Cook islanders, irrespective of where they live, would speak a Cook island language.

During the COVID-19 pandemic she had been based in New Zealand as the Cook Islands High Commissioner. She had worked, in Wellington, to assist the island's response to the pandemic. In October 2022 the New Zealand Foreign Minister, Nanaia Mahuta agreed the Hourua/Vaka Purua Statement of Partnership which is the basis of the relationship between the two countries. Wright-Koteka served as High Commissioner until the end of 2022 and she was succeeded by Kairangi Samuela in the following April. In 2023 Wright-Koteka was appointed to be the Cook Islands cabinet to be the secretary for infrastructure. She replaced Tamarii Tutangata, who had retired.
