= Foreign relations of Niue =

Niue maintains diplomatic relations with various other countries and multilateral organisations. Since 1974, Niue has been a self-governing state in free association with New Zealand. The King in right of New Zealand is the head of state of Niue, making Niue part of the Realm of New Zealand.

== History ==
On 19 October 1974, Niue entered into free association agreement with New Zealand. Under the Niue Constitution Act, the state would remain part of the Realm of New Zealand and would recognise the Monarch of New Zealand as its head of state. Under the arrangement, New Zealand also retains a constitutional link with Niue in relation to citizenship, with people from Niue being citizens of New Zealand. Per the Niue Constitution Act, New Zealand provides economic and administrative assistance to Niue as well as assistance in foreign affairs, defence and security at the request of the Niuean Government.

The Repertory of Practice of United Nations Organs records that in 1988 "New Zealand stated ... that its future participation in international agreements would no longer extend to ... Niue". Niue was granted membership of UNESCO in 1993 and the World Health Organization in 1994. Also in 1994, the United Nations Secretariat "recognized the full treaty-making capacity ... of Niue".

== Diplomatic relations ==
List of countries with which Niue maintains diplomatic relations:

#	Country	Date
1	New Zealand	2 August 1993
2	Malaysia	30 January 1996
3	China	12 December 2007
4	Singapore	6 August 2012
5	India	30 August 2012
6	Thailand	27 August 2013
—	Cook Islands	2013
7	Australia	27 February 2014
8	Turkey	7 June 2014
9	Cuba	5 September 2014
10	Papua New Guinea	9 December 2014
—	Kosovo	23 June 2015
11	Japan	4 August 2015
12	Italy	12 September 2015
13	Brazil	2 September 2016
14	Indonesia	12 July 2019
15	Peru	3 July 2020
16	Chile	6 July 2021
17	Tuvalu	11 July 2022
18	Philippines	27 September 2022
19	South Korea	29 May 2023
20	Israel	1 August 2023
21	Switzerland	9 August 2023
22	Canada	12 September 2023
23	United States	25 September 2023
24	Fiji	7 November 2023
25	Marshall Islands	26 August 2024
26	Germany	3 February 2026
27	France	Unknown
28	Nauru	Unknown
29	Samoa	Unknown

== Bilateral relations ==
=== Americas ===
Country	Formal Relations Began	Notes
United States	2023	The United States established diplomatic relations with Niue on 25 September 2023.

=== Asia ===
Country	Formal Relations Began	Notes
China	2007	Main article: China–Niue relations: China's Ambassador to New Zealand, Zhang Limin, who was accredited to Niue, and became the first Chinese ambassador to present his credentials there in October 2008.
India	2010	Main article: India–Niue relations: India and Niue established diplomatic relations on 30 August 2010, when Minister of State for External Affairs E. Ahamed and Niuean Premier Toke Talagi signed a Joint Communique formalising relations on the sidelines of the 2010 Pacific Islands Forum (PIF) meeting.

=== Oceania ===
Country	Formal Relations Began	Notes
Australia	2013	Between 2013 and 2020, the Australian High Commissioner to New Zealand was accredited to Niue. In August 2020, Australia established a High Commission in Alofi with a residential High Commissioner
New Zealand	1993	Main article: New Zealand–Niue relations: Niue is represented by a High Commission in New Zealand.; New Zealand is represented by a High Commission in Niue.

== International organisation participation ==
- ACP, AOSIS, ESCAP (associate), FAO, IFAD, OPCW, Pacific Islands Forum, Sparteca, SPC, UNESCO, WHO, WMO
- Commonwealth of Nations - Niue is a part of the Commonwealth, but is not a member state, being a dependency of New Zealand, whose Commonwealth membership covers Niue, Cook Islands, and Tokelau, as well as New Zealand itself.
- In November 2011, Niue was one of the eight founding members of Polynesian Leaders Group, a regional grouping intended to cooperate on a variety of issues including culture and language, education, responses to climate change, and trade and investment.

== Participation in international treaties and conventions ==
- Biodiversity Convention and its Cartagena Protocol, Cotonou Agreement, POPs Project, UNCCD, UNCLOS, UNFCCC and its Kyoto Protocol

== See also ==
- Foreign relations of the Cook Islands
- Foreign relations of New Zealand
- List of diplomatic missions in Niue
- Politics of Niue
