= List of sovereign states and dependent territories by continent (data file) =

- Type of format: Document file format
- Standard: ISO 3166-1 alpha-2; ISO 3166-1 alpha-3; ISO 3166-1 numeric

The list of sovereign states and dependent territories by continent data file is a plain text format describing the list of countries by continent, suitable for automated processing.

== Format ==
Continent code (CC): AF - Africa; AS - Asia; EU - Europe; NA - North America; SA - South America; OC - Oceania; AN - Antarctica	Country code		Country number	English country name (Name)
Continent code (CC): AF - Africa; AS - Asia; EU - Europe; NA - North America; SA - South America; OC - Oceania; AN - Antarctica	Two-letter; ISO 3166-1 alpha-2 (a-2)	Three-letter; ISO 3166-1 alpha-3 (a-3)	Three-digit; ISO 3166-1 numeric (#)	English country name (Name)

== Data file ==
Note: This data was compiled by hand and may contain mistakes. One small modification is that the various "insular areas of the United States" listed above are recorded here as the single "United States Minor Outlying Islands" in Oceania.

CC	a-2	a-3	#	Name
AS	AF	AFG	004	Afghanistan, Islamic Republic of
EU	AL	ALB	008	Albania, Republic of
AN	AQ	ATA	010	Antarctica (the territory South of 60 deg S)
AF	DZ	DZA	012	Algeria, People's Democratic Republic of
OC	AS	ASM	016	American Samoa
EU	AD	AND	020	Andorra, Principality of
AF	AO	AGO	024	Angola, Republic of
NA	AG	ATG	028	Antigua and Barbuda
AS	AZ	AZE	031	Azerbaijan, Republic of
SA	AR	ARG	032	Argentina, Argentine Republic
OC	AU	AUS	036	Australia, Commonwealth of
EU	AT	AUT	040	Austria, Republic of
NA	BS	BHS	044	Bahamas, Commonwealth of the
AS	BH	BHR	048	Bahrain, Kingdom of
AS	BD	BGD	050	Bangladesh, People's Republic of
AS	AM	ARM	051	Armenia, Republic of
NA	BB	BRB	052	Barbados
EU	BE	BEL	056	Belgium, Kingdom of
NA	BM	BMU	060	Bermuda
AS	BT	BTN	064	Bhutan, Kingdom of
SA	BO	BOL	068	Bolivia, Plurinational State of
EU	BA	BIH	070	Bosnia and Herzegovina
AF	BW	BWA	072	Botswana, Republic of
AN	BV	BVT	074	Bouvet Island (Bouvetoya)
SA	BR	BRA	076	Brazil, Federative Republic of
NA	BZ	BLZ	084	Belize
AF	IO	IOT	086	British Indian Ocean Territory
OC	SB	SLB	090	Solomon Islands
NA	VG	VGB	092	British Virgin Islands
AS	BN	BRN	096	Brunei, Nation of, the Abode of Peace
EU	BG	BGR	100	Bulgaria, Republic of
AS	MM	MMR	104	Myanmar, Union of
AF	BI	BDI	108	Burundi, Republic of
EU	BY	BLR	112	Belarus, Republic of
AS	KH	KHM	116	Cambodia, Kingdom of
AF	CM	CMR	120	Cameroon, Republic of
NA	CA	CAN	124	Canada
AF	CV	CPV	132	Cape Verde, Republic of
NA	KY	CYM	136	Cayman Islands
AF	CF	CAF	140	Central African Republic
AS	LK	LKA	144	Sri Lanka, Democratic Socialist Republic of
AF	TD	TCD	148	Chad, Republic of
SA	CL	CHL	152	Chile, Republic of
AS	CN	CHN	156	China, People's Republic of
AS	TW	TWN	158	Taiwan
AS	CX	CXR	162	Christmas Island
AS	CC	CCK	166	Cocos (Keeling) Islands
SA	CO	COL	170	Colombia, Republic of
AF	KM	COM	174	Comoros, Union of the
AF	YT	MYT	175	Mayotte, Department of
AF	CG	COG	178	Congo, Republic of the
AF	CD	COD	180	Congo, Democratic Republic of the
OC	CK	COK	184	Cook Islands
NA	CR	CRI	188	Costa Rica, Republic of
EU	HR	HRV	191	Croatia, Republic of
NA	CU	CUB	192	Cuba, Republic of
AS	CY	CYP	196	Cyprus, Republic of
EU	CZ	CZE	203	Czech Republic
AF	BJ	BEN	204	Benin, Republic of
EU	DK	DNK	208	Denmark, Kingdom of
NA	DM	DMA	212	Dominica, Commonwealth of
NA	DO	DOM	214	Dominican Republic
SA	EC	ECU	218	Ecuador, Republic of
NA	SV	SLV	222	El Salvador, Republic of
AF	GQ	GNQ	226	Equatorial Guinea, Republic of
AF	ET	ETH	231	Ethiopia, Federal Democratic Republic of
AF	ER	ERI	232	Eritrea, State of
EU	EE	EST	233	Estonia, Republic of
EU	FO	FRO	234	Faroe Islands
SA	FK	FLK	238	Falkland Islands (Malvinas)
AN	GS	SGS	239	South Georgia and the South Sandwich Islands
OC	FJ	FJI	242	Fiji, Republic of
EU	FI	FIN	246	Finland, Republic of
EU	AX	ALA	248	Åland Islands
EU	FR	FRA	250	France, French Republic
SA	GF	GUF	254	French Guiana
OC	PF	PYF	258	French Polynesia
AF	TF	ATF	260	French Southern Territories
AF	DJ	DJI	262	Djibouti, Republic of
AF	GA	GAB	266	Gabon, Gabonese Republic
AS	GE	GEO	268	Georgia
AF	GM	GMB	270	Gambia, Republic of the
EU	DE	DEU	276	Germany, Federal Republic of
AF	GH	GHA	288	Ghana, Republic of
EU	GI	GIB	292	Gibraltar
OC	KI	KIR	296	Kiribati, Republic of
EU	GR	GRC	300	Greece, Hellenic Republic
NA	GL	GRL	304	Greenland
NA	GD	GRD	308	Grenada
NA	GP	GLP	312	Guadeloupe
OC	GU	GUM	316	Guam
NA	GT	GTM	320	Guatemala, Republic of
AF	GN	GIN	324	Guinea, Republic of
SA	GY	GUY	328	Guyana, Co-operative Republic of
NA	HT	HTI	332	Haiti, Republic of
AN	HM	HMD	334	Heard Island and McDonald Islands
EU	VA	VAT	336	Holy See (Vatican City State)
NA	HN	HND	340	Honduras, Republic of
AS	HK	HKG	344	Hong Kong, Special Administrative Region of China
EU	HU	HUN	348	Hungary, Republic of
EU	IS	ISL	352	Iceland, Republic of
AS	IN	IND	356	India, Republic of
AS	ID	IDN	360	Indonesia, Republic of
AS	IR	IRN	364	Iran, Islamic Republic of
AS	IQ	IRQ	368	Iraq, Republic of
EU	IE	IRL	372	Ireland
AS	IL	ISR	376	Israel, State of
EU	IT	ITA	380	Italy, Italian Republic
AF	CI	CIV	384	Côte d'Ivoire, Republic of
NA	JM	JAM	388	Jamaica
AS	JP	JPN	392	Japan
AS	KZ	KAZ	398	Kazakhstan, Republic of
AS	JO	JOR	400	Jordan, Hashemite Kingdom of
AF	KE	KEN	404	Kenya, Republic of
AS	KP	PRK	408	Korea, Democratic People's Republic of
AS	KR	KOR	410	Korea, Republic of
EU	XK	XKX		Kosovo, Republic of
AS	KW	KWT	414	Kuwait, State of
AS	KG	KGZ	417	Kyrgyz Republic
AS	LA	LAO	418	Lao People's Democratic Republic
AS	LB	LBN	422	Lebanon, Lebanese Republic
AF	LS	LSO	426	Lesotho, Kingdom of
EU	LV	LVA	428	Latvia, Republic of
AF	LR	LBR	430	Liberia, Republic of
AF	LY	LBY	434	Libya, State of
EU	LI	LIE	438	Liechtenstein, Principality of
EU	LT	LTU	440	Lithuania, Republic of
EU	LU	LUX	442	Luxembourg, Grand Duchy of
AS	MO	MAC	446	Macao, Special Administrative Region of China
AF	MG	MDG	450	Madagascar, Republic of
AF	MW	MWI	454	Malawi, Republic of
AS	MY	MYS	458	Malaysia
AS	MV	MDV	462	Maldives, Republic of
AF	ML	MLI	466	Mali, Republic of
EU	MT	MLT	470	Malta, Republic of
NA	MQ	MTQ	474	Martinique
AF	MR	MRT	478	Mauritania, Islamic Republic of
AF	MU	MUS	480	Mauritius, Republic of
NA	MX	MEX	484	Mexico, United Mexican States
EU	MC	MCO	492	Monaco, Principality of
AS	MN	MNG	496	Mongolia
EU	MD	MDA	498	Moldova, Republic of
EU	ME	MNE	499	Montenegro
NA	MS	MSR	500	Montserrat
AF	MA	MAR	504	Morocco, Kingdom of
AF	MZ	MOZ	508	Mozambique, Republic of
AS	OM	OMN	512	Oman, Sultanate of
AF	NA	NAM	516	Namibia, Republic of
OC	NR	NRU	520	Nauru, Republic of
AS	NP	NPL	524	Nepal, Federal Democratic Republic of
EU	NL	NLD	528	Netherlands, Kingdom of the
NA	CW	CUW	531	Curaçao
NA	AW	ABW	533	Aruba
NA	SX	SXM	534	Sint Maarten (Netherlands)
NA	BQ	BES	535	Bonaire, Sint Eustatius and Saba
OC	NC	NCL	540	New Caledonia
OC	VU	VUT	548	Vanuatu, Republic of
OC	NZ	NZL	554	New Zealand
NA	NI	NIC	558	Nicaragua, Republic of
AF	NE	NER	562	Niger, Republic of
AF	NG	NGA	566	Nigeria, Federal Republic of
OC	NU	NIU	570	Niue
OC	NF	NFK	574	Norfolk Island
EU	NO	NOR	578	Norway, Kingdom of
OC	MP	MNP	580	Northern Mariana Islands, Commonwealth of the
OC	UM	UMI	581	United States Minor Outlying Islands
OC	FM	FSM	583	Micronesia, Federated States of
OC	MH	MHL	584	Marshall Islands, Republic of the
OC	PW	PLW	585	Palau, Republic of
AS	PK	PAK	586	Pakistan, Islamic Republic of
AS	PS	PSE	275	Palestine, State of
NA	PA	PAN	591	Panama, Republic of
OC	PG	PNG	598	Papua New Guinea, Independent State of
SA	PY	PRY	600	Paraguay, Republic of
SA	PE	PER	604	Peru, Republic of
AS	PH	PHL	608	Philippines, Republic of the
OC	PN	PCN	612	Pitcairn Islands
EU	PL	POL	616	Poland, Republic of
EU	PT	PRT	620	Portugal, Portuguese Republic
AF	GW	GNB	624	Guinea-Bissau, Republic of
AS	TL	TLS	626	Timor-Leste, Democratic Republic of
NA	PR	PRI	630	Puerto Rico, Commonwealth of
AS	QA	QAT	634	Qatar, State of
AF	RE	REU	638	Reunion
EU	RO	ROU	642	Romania
EU	RU	RUS	643	Russian Federation
AF	RW	RWA	646	Rwanda, Republic of
NA	BL	BLM	652	Saint Barthelemy
AF	SH	SHN	654	Saint Helena
NA	KN	KNA	659	Saint Kitts and Nevis, Federation of
NA	AI	AIA	660	Anguilla
NA	LC	LCA	662	Saint Lucia
NA	MF	MAF	663	Saint Martin
NA	PM	SPM	666	Saint Pierre and Miquelon
NA	VC	VCT	670	Saint Vincent and the Grenadines
EU	SM	SMR	674	San Marino, Republic of
AF	ST	STP	678	São Tomé and Príncipe, Democratic Republic of
AS	SA	SAU	682	Saudi Arabia, Kingdom of
AF	SN	SEN	686	Senegal, Republic of
EU	RS	SRB	688	Serbia, Republic of
AF	SC	SYC	690	Seychelles, Republic of
AF	SL	SLE	694	Sierra Leone, Republic of
AS	SG	SGP	702	Singapore, Republic of
EU	SK	SVK	703	Slovakia (Slovak Republic)
AS	VN	VNM	704	Vietnam, Socialist Republic of
EU	SI	SVN	705	Slovenia, Republic of
AF	SO	SOM	706	Somalia, Federal Republic of
AF	ZA	ZAF	710	South Africa, Republic of
AF	ZW	ZWE	716	Zimbabwe, Republic of
EU	ES	ESP	724	Spain, Kingdom of
AF	SS	SSD	728	South Sudan, Republic of
AF	SD	SDN	729	Sudan, Republic of the
AF	EH	ESH	732	Sahrawi Arab Democratic Republic
SA	SR	SUR	740	Suriname, Republic of
EU	SJ	SJM	744	Svalbard & Jan Mayen Islands
AF	SZ	SWZ	748	Eswatini, Kingdom of
EU	SE	SWE	752	Sweden, Kingdom of
EU	CH	CHE	756	Switzerland, Swiss Confederation
AS	SY	SYR	760	Syrian Arab Republic
AS	TJ	TJK	762	Tajikistan, Republic of
AS	TH	THA	764	Thailand, Kingdom of
AF	TG	TGO	768	Togo, Togolese Republic
OC	TK	TKL	772	Tokelau
OC	TO	TON	776	Tonga, Kingdom of
NA	TT	TTO	780	Trinidad and Tobago, Republic of
AS	AE	ARE	784	United Arab Emirates
AF	TN	TUN	788	Tunisia, Republic of
AS	TR	TUR	792	Turkey, Republic of
AS	TM	TKM	795	Turkmenistan
NA	TC	TCA	796	Turks and Caicos Islands
OC	TV	TUV	798	Tuvalu
AF	UG	UGA	800	Uganda, Republic of
EU	UA	UKR	804	Ukraine
EU	MK	MKD	807	North Macedonia, Republic of
AF	EG	EGY	818	Egypt, Arab Republic of
EU	GB	GBR	826	United Kingdom of Great Britain & Northern Ireland
EU	GG	GGY	831	Guernsey, Bailiwick of
EU	JE	JEY	832	Jersey, Bailiwick of
EU	IM	IMN	833	Isle of Man
AF	TZ	TZA	834	Tanzania, United Republic of
NA	US	USA	840	United States of America
NA	VI	VIR	850	United States Virgin Islands
AF	BF	BFA	854	Burkina Faso
SA	UY	URY	858	Uruguay, Oriental Republic of
AS	UZ	UZB	860	Uzbekistan, Republic of
SA	VE	VEN	862	Venezuela, Bolivarian Republic of
OC	WF	WLF	876	Wallis and Futuna
OC	WS	WSM	882	Samoa, Independent State of
AS	YE	YEM	887	Yemen
AF	ZM	ZMB	894	Zambia, Republic of
AS	XD	null	null	United Nations Neutral Zone
AS	XS	null	null	Spratly Islands
OC	XX	null	null	Disputed Territory

== See also ==
- List of sovereign states and dependent territories by continent
- List of countries and capitals in native languages
- List of national capitals
- Gallery of sovereign state flags
- Gallery of dependent territory flags
