= List of sovereign states and dependent territories by continent =

This is a list of sovereign states and dependent territories of the world by continent, displayed with their respective national flags, including the following entities:

- By association within the UN system:
  - The 193 United Nations (UN) member states.
  - Vatican City (administered by the Holy See, a UN General Assembly observer state), which has diplomatic relations with 183 countries as of 7 January 2019.
  - Palestine (a UN General Assembly observer state), which has diplomatic relations with 157 countries as of 23 September 2025.
- By other states:
  - Generally, this contains states with limited recognition and associated states not members of the United Nations.
  - Partially recognised de facto sovereign states with UN membership, such as the Republic of Kosovo and the Republic of China (Taiwan).
  - De facto sovereign states lacking general international recognition.
  - Cook Islands and Niue, two states in free association with New Zealand without UN membership.
- By dependent territories of other UN member states:
  - Generally, this contains non-sovereign territories that are recognised by the UN as part of some member state.
  - Dependent territories.
  - Other territories often regarded as separate geographical territories, even though they are integral parts of their mother countries (such as the overseas departments and regions of France).

This list divides the world using the seven-continent model, with islands grouped into adjacent continents.

== Legend ==
"Membership within the UN System" column legend

UN Member states
UN General Assembly observer state
Member state of a UN Specialized Agency
Observer in a UN Specialized Agency
No membership
Dependent Territory of UN member

"Sovereignty dispute" column legend

Undisputed sovereignty
Disputed sovereignty

== Africa ==
For a table of sovereign states and dependent territories in Africa with geographical data such as area, population, and population density, see Africa: territories and regions.

Geologically, Africa is connected to Eurasia by the Isthmus of Suez and forms part of Afro-Eurasia.

Common and formal names	Membership within the UN System (Note: This column indicates whether or not a state is a member of the United Nations. It also indicates which non-member states participate in the United Nations System through membership in the International Atomic Energy Agency or one of the specialized agencies of the United Nations. All United Nations members belong to at least one specialized agency and are parties to the statute of the International Court of Justice.)	Sovereignty dispute (Note: This column indicates whether or not a state is the subject of a major sovereignty dispute. Only states whose entire sovereignty is disputed by another state are listed.)	Further information on status and recognition of sovereignty (Note: Information is included on: The extent to which a state's sovereignty is recognised internationally. More information can be found at List of states with limited recognition, Membership in the European Union, (Note: The member states of the European Union have transferred part of their sovereignty in the form of legislative, executive, and judicial powers to the institutions of the EU, which is an example of supranational union. The EU has 27 member states.) where applicable, Any dependencies, if applicable, which are generally not part of the territory of the sovereign state, federal structure of the state, where applicable. More information can be found at Federated state, Any autonomous areas inside the territory of the sovereign state, Any situations where one person is the Head of State of more than one state, Any governments in exile recognised by at least one state.)
↓ UN member states and General Assembly observer states ↓			
Algeria – People's Democratic Republic of Algeria	UN member state	None	
Angola – Republic of Angola	UN member state	None	
Benin – Republic of Benin	UN member state	None	
Botswana – Republic of Botswana	UN member state	None	
Burkina Faso	UN member state	None	
Burundi – Republic of Burundi	UN member state	None	
Cameroon – Republic of Cameroon	UN member state	None	
Cape Verde – Republic of Cabo Verde (Note: The government of Cape Verde declared "Cabo Verde" to be the official English name of the country in 2013.)	UN member state	None	
Central African Republic	UN member state	None	
Chad – Republic of Chad	UN member state	None	
Comoros – Union of the Comoros	UN member state	None	Comoros is a federation of three islands. (Note: More information on more or less federal structures can be found at a List of federations.)
Congo, Democratic Republic of the (Note: Also known as Congo-Kinshasa. Formerly referred to as Zaire, its official name from 1971 to 1997.)	UN member state	None	
Congo, Republic of the (Note: Also known as Congo-Brazzaville.)	UN member state	None	
Djibouti – Republic of Djibouti	UN member state	None	
Egypt – Arab Republic of Egypt	UN member state	None	
Equatorial Guinea – Republic of Equatorial Guinea	UN member state	None	
Eritrea – State of Eritrea	UN member state	None	
Eswatini – Kingdom of Eswatini (Note: Formerly referred to as the Kingdom of Swaziland, its official name until 2018.)	UN member state	None	
Ethiopia – Federal Democratic Republic of Ethiopia	UN member state	None	Ethiopia is a federation of twelve regions and two chartered cities.
Gabon – Gabonese Republic	UN member state	None	
Gambia, The – Republic of the Gambia	UN member state	None	
Ghana – Republic of Ghana	UN member state	None	
Guinea – Republic of Guinea (Note: Also known as Guinea-Conakry.)	UN member state	None	
Guinea-Bissau – Republic of Guinea-Bissau	UN member state	None	
Ivory Coast – Republic of Côte d'Ivoire (Note: The government of Ivory Coast uses "Côte d'Ivoire" as the official English name of the country.)	UN member state	None	
Kenya – Republic of Kenya	UN member state	None	
Lesotho – Kingdom of Lesotho	UN member state	None	
Liberia – Republic of Liberia	UN member state	None	
Libya – State of Libya	UN member state	None	
Madagascar – Republic of Madagascar	UN member state	None	
Malawi – Republic of Malawi	UN member state	None	
Mali – Republic of Mali	UN member state	None	
Mauritania – Islamic Republic of Mauritania	UN member state	None	
Mauritius – Republic of Mauritius	UN member state	None	Mauritius has an autonomous island, Rodrigues. (Note: For more information on divisions with a high degree of autonomy, see the List of autonomous areas by country.)
Morocco – Kingdom of Morocco	UN member state	None	Part of the Moroccan-claimed Western Sahara is controlled by the partially recognised Sahrawi Arab Democratic Republic.
Mozambique – Republic of Mozambique	UN member state	None	
Namibia – Republic of Namibia	UN member state	None	
Niger – Republic of the Niger	UN member state	None	
Nigeria – Federal Republic of Nigeria	UN member state	None	Nigeria is a federation of 36 states and one federal territory.
Republic of the Congo → See Congo, Republic of the listing			
Rwanda – Republic of Rwanda	UN member state	None	
Sahrawi Arab Democratic Republic → See Sahrawi Arab Democratic Republic listing			
São Tomé and Príncipe – Democratic Republic of São Tomé and Príncipe	UN member state	None	São Tomé and Príncipe contains one autonomous province, Príncipe.
Senegal – Republic of Senegal	UN member state	None	
Seychelles – Republic of Seychelles	UN member state	None	
Sierra Leone – Republic of Sierra Leone	UN member state	None	
Somalia – Federal Republic of Somalia	UN member state	None	Somalia is a federation of six states. Two, Puntland and Galmudug, have self-declared autonomy, while one, Somaliland, is de facto independent.
South Africa – Republic of South Africa	UN member state	None	
South Sudan – Republic of South Sudan	UN member state	None	South Sudan is a federation of 10 states and three administrative areas.: The Abyei Area is a zone with "special administrative status" established by the Comprehensive Peace Agreement in 2005. It is de jure a condominium of South Sudan and Sudan, but de facto administered by two competing administrations and the United Nations.
Sudan – Republic of the Sudan	UN member state	None	Sudan is a federation of 18 states.: The Abyei Area is a zone with "special administrative status" established by the Comprehensive Peace Agreement in 2005. It is de jure a condominium of South Sudan and Sudan, but de facto administered by two competing administrations and the United Nations.
Tanzania – United Republic of Tanzania	UN member state	None	Tanzania contains one autonomous region, Zanzibar.
Togo – Togolese Republic	UN member state	None	
Tunisia – Republic of Tunisia	UN member state	None	
Uganda – Republic of Uganda	UN member state	None	
Zambia – Republic of Zambia	UN member state	None	
Zimbabwe – Republic of Zimbabwe	UN member state	None	
↑ UN member states and General Assembly observer states ↑			
↓ Other states ↓			
Sahrawi Arab Democratic Republic	No membership	Claimed by Morocco	Recognised at some stage by 84 UN member states, 38 of which have since withdrawn or frozen their recognition. It is a founding member of the African Union and the Asian–African Strategic Partnership formed at the 2005 Asian–African Conference. The territories under its control, the so-called Free Zone, are claimed in whole by Morocco as part of its Southern Provinces. In turn, the Sahrawi Arab Democratic Republic claims the part of Western Sahara to the west of the Moroccan Wall controlled by Morocco. Its government resides in exile in Tindouf, Algeria.
Somaliland – Republic of Somaliland	No membership	Claimed by Somalia	A de facto independent state, diplomatically recognised by Israel, and maintaining unofficial relations with several UN member states and the Republic of China (Taiwan).; claimed in whole by the Federal Republic of Somalia.
↑ Other states ↑			
↓ Dependent Territories ↓			
Bouvet Island	Norwegian Dependent Territory	None	
British Indian Ocean Territory	British Overseas Territory		
French Southern and Antarctic Lands	French Overseas Territory	None	
Heard Island and McDonald Islands – Territory of Heard Island and McDonald Islands	Australian External Territory	None	
Mayotte – Department of Mayotte	French Overseas Department and Region	None	
Réunion – Department of Réunion	French Overseas Department and Region	None	
Saint Helena, Ascension and Tristan da Cunha	British Overseas Territory	None	
↑ Dependent Territories ↑			

- Transcontinental countries in Europe and Africa, classified as Southern European countries by the United Nations Statistics Division: Italy (Pantelleria and the Pelagian Islands), Malta, Portugal (Madeira [including the Savage Islands]), and Spain (Canary Islands, Ceuta, Melilla, Alboran Island, and Spain's plazas de soberanía).
- Transcontinental country in Europe and Africa, classified as a Western European country by the United Nations Statistics Division: France (Mayotte, and Réunion).
- Transcontinental country in Asia and Africa, classified as a Western Asian country by the United Nations Statistics Division: Yemen (Socotra).

== Asia ==
For a table of sovereign states and dependent territories in Asia with geographical data such as area, population, and population density, see Asia: territories and regions.

Geologically, Asia is part of Eurasia and due to the Isthmus of Suez forms part of Afro-Eurasia.

Common and formal names	Membership within the UN System (Note: This column indicates whether or not a state is a member of the United Nations. It also indicates which non-member states participate in the United Nations System through membership in the International Atomic Energy Agency or one of the specialized agencies of the United Nations. All United Nations members belong to at least one specialized agency and are parties to the statute of the International Court of Justice.)	Sovereignty dispute (Note: This column indicates whether or not a state is the subject of a major sovereignty dispute. Only states whose entire sovereignty is disputed by another state are listed.)	Further information on status and recognition of sovereignty (Note: Information is included on: The extent to which a state's sovereignty is recognised internationally. More information can be found at List of states with limited recognition, Membership in the European Union, where applicable, Any dependencies, if applicable, which are generally not part of the territory of the sovereign state, federal structure of the state, where applicable. More information can be found at Federated state, Any autonomous areas inside the territory of the sovereign state, Any situations where one person is the Head of State of more than one state, Any governments in exile recognised by at least one state.)
↓ UN member states and General Assembly observer states ↓			
Afghanistan – Islamic Emirate of Afghanistan	UN member state	None	The ruling Islamic Emirate of Afghanistan, in power since 2021, has not been recognised by the United Nations or any other state. The defunct Islamic Republic of Afghanistan remains the recognised government.
Armenia – Republic of Armenia	UN member state	None	
Azerbaijan – Republic of Azerbaijan	UN member state	None	Azerbaijan contains one autonomous region, Nakhchivan.
Bahrain – Kingdom of Bahrain	UN member state	None	
Bangladesh – People's Republic of Bangladesh	UN member state	None	
Bhutan – Kingdom of Bhutan	UN member state	None	
Brunei – Brunei Darussalam	UN member state	None	
Burma → See Myanmar listing			
Cambodia – Kingdom of Cambodia	UN member state	None	
China – People's Republic of China (Note: The People's Republic of China (PRC) is commonly referred to as "China", while the Republic of China (ROC) is commonly referred to as "Taiwan". The ROC is also occasionally known diplomatically as Chinese Taipei, or by another alternative name.)	UN member state	Partially unrecognised. Claimed by the Republic of China	China contains five autonomous regions, Guangxi, Inner Mongolia, Ningxia, Tibet, and Xinjiang. Additionally, it has sovereignty over the Special Administrative Regions of: Hong Kong; Macau; China claims, but does not control Taiwan, which is governed by a rival administration (the Republic of China) that claims all of China as its territory. (Note: In 1949, the Republic of China government led by the Kuomintang (KMT) lost the Chinese Civil War to the Chinese Communist Party (CCP) and set up a provisional capital in Taipei. The CCP established the PRC. As such, the political status of the ROC and legal status of Taiwan (alongside the territories under ROC jurisdiction) are in dispute. In 1971, the United Nations gave the China seat to the PRC. In the view of the United Nations, no member of the organisation withdrew as a consequence of this but the ROC representatives declared that they were withdrawing. Most states recognise the PRC to be the sole legitimate representative of all China, and the UN classifies Taiwan as "Taiwan, Province of China". The ROC has de facto relations with most sovereign states. A significant political movement within Taiwan advocates Taiwan independence.) China is not recognised by 12 UN member states and the Holy See, which, with the exception of Bhutan, all recognise Taiwan instead. (Note: See also Dates of establishment of diplomatic relations with the People's Republic of China and Foreign relations of China.)
China, Republic of → See Taiwan listing			
Cyprus – Republic of Cyprus	UN member state	Not recognised by Turkey	Member of the EU. The northeastern part of the island is the de facto state of Northern Cyprus. Cyprus is not recognised by Turkey due to the Cyprus dispute, with Turkey recognising Northern Cyprus.
Democratic People's Republic of Korea → See Korea, North listing			
East Timor – Democratic Republic of Timor-Leste (Note: The government of East Timor uses "Timor-Leste" as the official English name of the country.)	UN member state	None	
Egypt – Arab Republic of Egypt	UN member state	None	
Georgia	UN member state	None	Georgia contains two autonomous republics, Adjara and Abkhazia. In Abkhazia and South Ossetia, de facto states have been formed.
India – Republic of India	UN member state	None	India is a federation of 28 states and eight union territories.
Indonesia – Republic of Indonesia	UN member state	None	Indonesia has eight autonomous provinces, Aceh, Jakarta, Central Papua, Highland Papua, Papua, South Papua, West Papua, and Yogyakarta.
Iran – Islamic Republic of Iran	UN member state	None	
Iraq – Republic of Iraq	UN member state	None	Iraq is a federation of 19 governorates, four of which make up the autonomous Kurdistan Region.
Israel – State of Israel	UN member state	Partially unrecognised Disputed by Palestine	Israel exerts strong control over the territory claimed by Palestine. Israel annexed East Jerusalem, an annexation not recognised by the international community. Israel maintains varying levels of control over the rest of the West Bank, and although Israel no longer has a permanent civilian or military presence in the Gaza Strip, following its unilateral disengagement, it is still considered by some to be the occupying power under international law. Israel is not recognised as a state by 28 UN members and the Sahrawi Arab Democratic Republic. The Palestine Liberation Organization, recognised by a majority of UN member states as the sole representative of the Palestinian people, recognised Israel in 1993.
Japan	UN member state	None	
Jordan – Hashemite Kingdom of Jordan	UN member state	None	
Kazakhstan – Republic of Kazakhstan	UN member state	None	
Korea, North – Democratic People's Republic of Korea	UN member state	Claimed by South Korea	North Korea is not recognised by three UN members, France, Japan, and South Korea, the last of which claims to be the sole legitimate government of Korea.
Korea, South – Republic of Korea	UN member state	Claimed by North Korea	South Korea has one autonomous region, Jejudo. South Korea is not recognised by North Korea, which claims to be the sole legitimate government of Korea.
Kuwait – State of Kuwait	UN member state	None	
Kyrgyzstan – Kyrgyz Republic	UN member state	None	
Laos – Lao People's Democratic Republic	UN member state	None	
Lebanon – Republic of Lebanon	UN member state	None	
Malaysia	UN member state	None	Malaysia is a federation of 13 states and three federal territories.
Maldives – Republic of Maldives	UN member state	None	
Mongolia	UN member state	None	
Myanmar – Republic of the Union of Myanmar (Note: The country's official name of Myanmar, adopted in 1989, has been mixed and controversial, with the former name Burma still being used in many cases. See Names of Myanmar.)	UN member state	None	Wa State is a de facto autonomous state within Myanmar. The United Nations has not recognized the de facto ruling government of Myanmar, the State Administration Council.
Nepal – Federal Democratic Republic of Nepal	UN member state	None	Nepal is a federation composed of 7 provinces.
Oman – Sultanate of Oman	UN member state	None	
Pakistan – Islamic Republic of Pakistan	UN member state	None	Pakistan is a federation of four provinces and one capital territory. Pakistan exercises control over certain portions of Kashmir, but has not officially annexed any of it, instead regarding it as a disputed territory. The portions that it controls are divided into two territories, administered separately from Pakistan proper: Azad Kashmir; Gilgit-Baltistan; Azad Kashmir describes itself as a "self-governing state under Pakistani control", while Gilgit-Baltistan is described in its governance order as a group of "areas" with self-government. These territories are not usually regarded as sovereign, as they do not fulfil the criteria set out by the declarative theory of statehood (for example, their current laws do not allow them to engage independently in relations with other states). Several state functions of these territories (such as foreign affairs and defence) are performed by Pakistan.
Palestine – State of Palestine	UN General Assembly observer state; member of 2 UN specialized agencies	Partially unrecognised. Disputed by Israel	The State of Palestine, declared in 1988, is not recognised as a state by Israel but has received diplomatic recognition from 157 states. The proclaimed state has no agreed territorial borders, or effective control over much of the territory that it proclaimed. The Palestinian National Authority is an interim administrative body formed as a result of the Oslo Accords that exercises limited autonomous jurisdiction within the Palestinian territories. In foreign relations, Palestine is represented by the Palestine Liberation Organization. The State of Palestine is a member state of UNESCO, UNIDO and other international organizations.
Philippines – Republic of the Philippines	UN member state	None	The Philippines contains one autonomous region, Bangsamoro.
Qatar – State of Qatar	UN member state	None	
Russia – Russian Federation	UN member state	None	Russia is a federation of 85 federal subjects (republics, oblasts, krais, autonomous okrugs, federal cities, and an autonomous oblast). Several of the federal subjects are ethnic republics.
Saudi Arabia – Kingdom of Saudi Arabia	UN member state	None	
Singapore – Republic of Singapore	UN member state	None	
Sri Lanka – Democratic Socialist Republic of Sri Lanka (Note: Formerly known as Ceylon until 1972.)	UN member state	None	
Syria – Syrian Arab Republic	UN member state	None	The Syrian National Coalition, which is recognised as the legitimate representative of the Syrian people by 20 UN members, has established an interim government to rule rebel controlled territory during the Syrian civil war. Syria has one self-declared autonomous region: Rojava.
Tajikistan – Republic of Tajikistan	UN member state	None	Tajikistan contains one autonomous region, Gorno-Badakhshan Autonomous Province.
Thailand – Kingdom of Thailand	UN member state	None	
Timor-Leste → See East Timor listing			
Turkey – Republic of Türkiye	UN member state	None	
Turkmenistan	UN member state	None	
United Arab Emirates	UN member state	None	The United Arab Emirates is a federation of seven emirates.
Uzbekistan – Republic of Uzbekistan	UN member state	None	Uzbekistan contains one autonomous region, Karakalpakstan.
Vietnam – Socialist Republic of Vietnam	UN member state	None	
Yemen – Republic of Yemen	UN member state	None	
↑ UN member states and General Assembly observer states ↑			
↓ Other states ↓			
Abkhazia – Republic of Abkhazia	No membership	Claimed by Georgia	Recognised by Russia, Nauru, Nicaragua, Syria, Venezuela, South Ossetia and Transnistria. Claimed in whole by Georgia as the Autonomous Republic of Abkhazia.
Northern Cyprus – Turkish Republic of Northern Cyprus	No membership	Claimed by the Republic of Cyprus	Recognised only by Turkey. Under the name "Turkish Cypriot State", it is an observer state of the Organisation of Islamic Cooperation and the Economic Cooperation Organization. Northern Cyprus is claimed in whole by the Republic of Cyprus.
South Ossetia – Republic of South Ossetia – State of Alania	No membership	Claimed by Georgia	A de facto independent state, recognised by Russia, Nicaragua, Nauru, Syria, Venezuela, Abkhazia and Transnistria. Claimed in whole by Georgia as the Provisional Administrative Entity of South Ossetia.
Taiwan – Republic of China	Former UN member state (1945 - 1971)	Partially unrecognised. Claimed by the People's Republic of China	A state competing (nominally) for recognition with the People's Republic of China (PRC) as the government of China since 1949. The Republic of China (ROC) controls the island of Taiwan and associated islands, Quemoy, Matsu, the Pratas and parts of the Spratly Islands, and has not renounced claims over its annexed territories on the mainland. The ROC is recognised by 11 UN member states and the Holy See as of 15 January 2024. All these states do not recognise the PRC either. Additionally, one UN member (Bhutan) has refrained from recognising either the ROC or the PRC. In addition to these relations, the ROC also maintains unofficial relations with 58 UN member states, one self-declared state (Somaliland), three territories (Guam, Hong Kong, and Macau), and the European Union via its representative offices and consulates under the One China principle. Taiwan has the 31st-largest diplomatic network in the world with 110 offices. The territory of the ROC is claimed in whole by the PRC. The ROC participates in international organizations under a variety of pseudonyms, most commonly "Chinese Taipei" and in the WTO it has full membership under the designation of "Separate Customs Territory of Taiwan, Penghu, Kinmen and Matsu". The ROC was a founding member of the UN and enjoyed membership from 1945 to 1971, with veto power in the UN Security Council. See China and the United Nations.
↑ Other states ↑			
↓ Dependent Territories ↓			
Akrotiri and Dhekelia – Sovereign Base Areas of Akrotiri and Dhekelia	British Overseas Territory	None	
Ashmore and Cartier Islands – Territory of Ashmore and Cartier Islands	Australian External Territory	Claimed by Indonesia	
British Indian Ocean Territory	British Overseas Territory		
Christmas Island – Territory of Christmas Island	Australian External Territory	None	
Cocos (Keeling) Islands – Territory of Cocos (Keeling) Islands	Australian External Territory	None	
Hong Kong – Hong Kong Special Administrative Region of the People's Republic of China	PRC Special Administrative Region	None	
Macau – Macao Special Administrative Region of the People's Republic of China	PRC Special Administrative Region	None	
↑ Dependent Territories ↑			

- Transcontinental country in Africa and Asia, classified as a Northern African country by the United Nations Statistics Division: Egypt (Sinai).
- Transcontinental country in Europe and Asia, classified as an Eastern European country by the United Nations Statistics Division: Russia (North Asia).
- States mostly or entirely in West Asia, but commonly associated with Europe, and a member of the Council of Europe: Armenia, Azerbaijan, Cyprus, Georgia, and Turkey.
- States with limited recognition, entirely in West Asia, but commonly associated with Europe: Abkhazia, North Cyprus, and South Ossetia.
- Entirely in Southeast Asia, but commonly associated with Oceania, and lying east of the biogeographical Wallace Line: East Timor.
- Transcontinental country in Europe and Asia, classified as a Southern European country by the United Nations Statistics Division: Greece (Islands in North Aegean and South Aegean).
- Transcontinental country in Asia and North America, classified as a Northern American country by the United Nations Statistics Division: United States (Little Diomede Island, Near Islands, and St. Lawrence Island).

== Europe ==
For a table of sovereign states and dependent territories in Europe with geographical data such as area, population, and population density, see Europe: political geography.

Geologically, Europe is part of Eurasia and due to the Isthmus of Suez forms part of Afro-Eurasia.

Common and formal names	Membership within the UN System (Note: This column indicates whether or not a state is a member of the United Nations. It also indicates which non-member states participate in the United Nations System through membership in the International Atomic Energy Agency or one of the specialized agencies of the United Nations. All United Nations members belong to at least one specialized agency and are parties to the statute of the International Court of Justice.)	Sovereignty dispute (Note: This column indicates whether or not a state is the subject of a major sovereignty dispute. Only states whose entire sovereignty is disputed by another state are listed.)	Further information on status and recognition of sovereignty (Note: Information is included on: The extent to which a state's sovereignty is recognised internationally. More information can be found at List of states with limited recognition, Membership in the European Union, where applicable, Any dependencies, if applicable, which are generally not part of the territory of the sovereign state, federal structure of the state, where applicable. More information can be found at Federated state, Any autonomous areas inside the territory of the sovereign state, Any situations where one person is the Head of State of more than one state, Any governments in exile recognised by at least one state.)
↓ UN member states and General Assembly observer states ↓			
Abkhazia → See Abkhazia listing			
Albania – Republic of Albania	UN member state	None	
Andorra – Principality of Andorra	UN member state	None	Andorra is a co-principality in which the office of head of state is jointly held ex officio by the French president and the bishop of the Roman Catholic diocese of Urgell, who himself is appointed with approval from the Holy See.
Armenia – Republic of Armenia	UN member state	None	
Austria – Republic of Austria	UN member state	None	Member of the European Union. Austria is a federation of nine states.
Azerbaijan – Republic of Azerbaijan	UN member state	None	Azerbaijan contains one autonomous region, Nakhchivan.
Belarus – Republic of Belarus	UN member state	None	Many states rescinded their recognition of President Alexander Lukashenko following the disputed 2020 election. Lithuania currently recognizes Sviatlana Tsikhanouskaya's Coordination Council as the legitimate government of Belarus.
Belgium – Kingdom of Belgium	UN member state	None	Member of the EU. Belgium is a federation of three linguistic communities and three regions.
Bosnia and Herzegovina	UN member state	None	Bosnia and Herzegovina has two constituent entities: Federation of Bosnia and Herzegovina; Republika Srpska; and Brčko District, a self-governing administrative district.
Bulgaria – Republic of Bulgaria	UN member state	None	Member of the EU.
Croatia – Republic of Croatia	UN member state	None	Member of the EU.
Cyprus – Republic of Cyprus	UN member state	Not recognised by Turkey	Member of the EU. The northeastern part of the island is the de facto state of Northern Cyprus. Cyprus is not recognised by Turkey due to the Cyprus dispute, with Turkey recognising Northern Cyprus.
Czech Republic (Note: A simpler official short name has been encouraged by the Czech government, "Czechia". This variant remains uncommon, but has been adopted by several companies and organisations. See Name of the Czech Republic.)	UN member state	None	Member of the EU.
Denmark – Kingdom of Denmark	UN member state	None	Member of the EU. The Kingdom of Denmark includes 2 self-governing territories: Faroe Islands; Greenland; The continental territory of Denmark, the Faroe Islands, and Greenland form the three constituent countries of the Kingdom of Denmark. (Note: The designation "Denmark" can refer either to continental Denmark or to the short name for the entire Kingdom (e.g. in international organizations).) The Kingdom of Denmark as a whole is a member of the EU, but EU law does not apply to the Faroe Islands and Greenland.
Estonia – Republic of Estonia	UN member state	None	Member of the EU.
Finland – Republic of Finland	UN member state	None	Member of the EU.: Åland is a neutral and demilitarised autonomous region of Finland. (Note: Åland was demilitarised by the Treaty of Paris in 1856, which was later affirmed by the League of Nations in 1921, and in a somewhat different context reaffirmed in the treaty on Finland's admission to the European Union in 1995.)
France – French Republic	UN member state	None	Member of the EU. France contains five overseas regions/departments: French Guiana, Guadeloupe, Martinique, Mayotte, and Réunion. France also includes the overseas territories of: Clipperton Island; French Polynesia; New Caledonia; Saint Barthélemy; Saint Martin; Saint Pierre and Miquelon; Wallis and Futuna; French Southern and Antarctic Lands (Note: France's claimed Antarctic territory of Adélie Land (Terre Adélie) is one of five constituent districts of the French Southern and Antarctic Lands.)
Georgia	UN member state	None	Georgia contains two autonomous republics, Adjara and Abkhazia. In Abkhazia and South Ossetia, de facto states have been formed.
Germany – Federal Republic of Germany	UN member state	None	Member of the EU. Germany is a federation of 16 states.
Greece – Hellenic Republic	UN member state	None	Member of the EU. Greece contains one autonomous area, Mount Athos.
Holy See → See Vatican City listing			
Hungary	UN member state	None	Member of the EU.
Iceland (Note: While sometimes referred to as the "Republic of Iceland" and sometimes its counterpart Lýðveldið Ísland in Icelandic, the official name of the country is simply "Iceland". One example of the former is the name of the Constitution of Iceland, which in Icelandic is Stjórnarskrá lýðveldisins Íslands and literally means "the Constitution of the republic of Iceland". However, note that in this usage "republic" is not capitalised.)	UN member state	None	
Ireland (Note: "Ireland" is the official name of the country in English. "Republic of Ireland" (the official description in English) and "Éire" (the official name in Irish) have sometimes been used unofficially to distinguish the state from the larger island of Ireland, however, this is officially deprecated. See names of the Irish state.)	UN member state	None	Member of the EU.
Italy – Italian Republic	UN member state	None	Member of the EU. Italy has 5 autonomous regions, Aosta Valley, Friuli-Venezia Giulia, Sardinia, Sicily and Trentino-Alto Adige/Südtirol.
Kazakhstan – Republic of Kazakhstan	UN member state	None	
Kosovo → See Kosovo listing			
Latvia – Republic of Latvia	UN member state	None	Member of the EU.
Liechtenstein – Principality of Liechtenstein	UN member state	None	
Lithuania – Republic of Lithuania	UN member state	None	Member of the EU.
Luxembourg – Grand Duchy of Luxembourg	UN member state	None	Member of the EU.
Macedonia → See North Macedonia listing			
Malta – Republic of Malta	UN member state	None	Member of the EU.
Moldova – Republic of Moldova	UN member state	None	Moldova has the autonomous regions of Gagauzia and the Left Bank of the Dniester. The latter, as well as the city of Bender (Tighina), are under the de facto control of Transnistria.
Monaco – Principality of Monaco	UN member state	None	
Montenegro	UN member state	None	
Netherlands – Kingdom of the Netherlands	UN member state	None	Member of the EU. The Kingdom of the Netherlands includes four areas with substantial autonomy: Aruba; Curaçao; Netherlands; Sint Maarten; Metropolitan Netherlands, Aruba, Curaçao, and Sint Maarten form the four constituent countries of the Kingdom. Three other overseas territories (Bonaire, Saba, and Sint Eustatius) are special municipalities of metropolitan Netherlands. (Note: The designation "Netherlands" can refer either to metropolitan Netherlands or to the entire Kingdom (e.g. in international organizations).) The Kingdom of the Netherlands as a whole is a member of the EU, but EU law applies only to parts within Europe.
North Macedonia – Republic of North Macedonia (Note: Formerly known constitutionally as the Republic of Macedonia from 1991 to 2019 and under the international designation of "the former Yugoslav Republic of Macedonia" (FYROM) from 1993 to 2019 due to the Macedonia naming dispute with Greece. Following the Prespa agreement going into effect in February 2019, the country was renamed to North Macedonia.)	UN member state	None	
Northern Cyprus → See Northern Cyprus listing			
Norway – Kingdom of Norway	UN member state	None	Norway has two unincorporated areas in Europe: Svalbard is an integral part of Norway, but has a special status due to the Svalbard Treaty.; Jan Mayen is an uninhabited island that is an integral part of Norway, although unincorporated.; Norway has one dependent territory and two claimed Antarctic dependent territories in the Southern Hemisphere: Bouvet Island; Peter I Island; Queen Maud Land
Poland – Republic of Poland	UN member state	None	Member of the EU.
Portugal – Portuguese Republic	UN member state	None	Member of the EU. Portugal contains two autonomous regions, the Azores and Madeira.
Pridnestrovie → See Transnistria listing			
Romania	UN member state	None	Member of the EU.
Russia – Russian Federation	UN member state	None	Russia is a federation of 85 federal subjects (republics, oblasts, krais, autonomous okrugs, federal cities, and an autonomous oblast). Several of the federal subjects are ethnic republics.
San Marino – Republic of San Marino	UN member state	None	
Serbia – Republic of Serbia	UN member state	None	Serbia contains two autonomous regions, Vojvodina and Kosovo and Metohija. The latter is under the de facto control of Kosovo.
Slovakia – Slovak Republic	UN member state	None	Member of the EU.
Slovenia – Republic of Slovenia	UN member state	None	Member of the EU.
South Ossetia → See South Ossetia listing			
Spain – Kingdom of Spain	UN member state	None	Member of the EU. Spain is divided into 17 autonomous communities and two special autonomous cities. (Note: Spain holds several small overseas territories scattered along the Mediterranean coast bordering Morocco, known as the Plazas de soberanía.)
Sweden – Kingdom of Sweden	UN member state	None	Member of the EU.
Switzerland – Swiss Confederation	UN member state	None	Switzerland is a federation of 26 cantons.
Transnistria → See Transnistria listing			
Turkey – Republic of Türkiye	UN member state	None	
Ukraine	UN member state	None	Ukraine contains one autonomous region, the Autonomous Republic of Crimea, which is under the de facto control of Russia, along with neighbouring Sevastopol, parts of the Donetsk, Luhansk, Kherson and Zaporizhzhia Oblasts.
United Kingdom – United Kingdom of Great Britain and Northern Ireland	UN member state	None	Former EU member. (Note: The UK formally withdrew from the European Union on 31 January 2020. The state saw a provisional transition period out of the supranational union in 2020, see Brexit, Post-Brexit relations.) The United Kingdom is a Commonwealth realm (Note: Commonwealth realms are members of the Commonwealth of Nations in which the head of state is Queen Elizabeth II. The realms are sovereign states; see Relationship of the realms.) consisting of four constituent countries; England; Northern Ireland; Scotland; Wales; The United Kingdom has the following 13 overseas territories and one claimed Antarctic dependent territory: Akrotiri and Dhekelia; Anguilla; Bermuda; British Indian Ocean Territory; British Virgin Islands; Cayman Islands; Falkland Islands; Gibraltar; Montserrat; Pitcairn Islands; Saint Helena, Ascension and Tristan da Cunha; South Georgia and the South Sandwich Islands; Turks and Caicos Islands; British Antarctic Territory; The British monarch also has direct sovereignty over three self-governing Crown Dependencies: Guernsey; Isle of Man; Jersey
Vatican City – Vatican City State	UN General Assembly observer state under the designation of "Holy See"; member of three UN specialized agencies and the IAEA	None	Administered by the Holy See, a sovereign entity with diplomatic relations to 183 states. This figure consists of 180 UN member states, the Cook Islands, the Republic of China (Taiwan), and the State of Palestine. In addition, the European Union and the Sovereign Military Order of Malta maintain diplomatic relations with the Holy See. The Holy See is a member of the IAEA, ITU, UPU, and WIPO and a permanent observer of the UN (in the category of "Non-member State") and multiple other UN System organizations. The Vatican City is governed by officials appointed by the Pope, who is the Bishop of the Diocese of Rome and ex officio sovereign of Vatican City.
↑ UN member states and General Assembly observer states ↑			
↓ Other states ↓			
Abkhazia – Republic of Abkhazia	No membership	Claimed by Georgia	Recognised by Russia, Nauru, Nicaragua, Syria, Venezuela, South Ossetia and Transnistria. Claimed in whole by Georgia as the Autonomous Republic of Abkhazia.
Kosovo – Republic of Kosovo	Member of two UN specialized agencies	Claimed by Serbia	Pursuant to United Nations Security Council Resolution 1244, Kosovo was placed under the administration of the United Nations Interim Administration Mission in Kosovo in 1999. Kosovo declared independence in 2008, and it has received diplomatic recognition from 118 UN member states and the Republic of China, while 18 states have recognized Kosovo only to later withdraw their recognition. Serbia continues to maintain its sovereignty claim over Kosovo. Other UN member states and non UN member states continue to recognise Serbian sovereignty or have taken no position on the question. Kosovo is a member of the International Monetary Fund and the World Bank Group. The Republic of Kosovo has de facto control over most of the territory, with limited control in North Kosovo.
Northern Cyprus – Turkish Republic of Northern Cyprus	No membership	Claimed by the Republic of Cyprus	Recognised only by Turkey. Under the name "Turkish Cypriot State", it is an observer state of the Organisation of Islamic Cooperation and the Economic Cooperation Organization. Northern Cyprus is claimed in whole by the Republic of Cyprus.
South Ossetia – Republic of South Ossetia – State of Alania	No membership	Claimed by Georgia	A de facto independent state, recognised by Russia, Nicaragua, Nauru, Syria, Venezuela, Abkhazia and Transnistria. Claimed in whole by Georgia as the Provisional Administrative Entity of South Ossetia.
Transnistria – Pridnestrovian Moldavian Republic	No membership	Claimed by Moldova	A de facto independent state, recognised only by Abkhazia and South Ossetia. Claimed in whole by Moldova as the Administrative-Territorial Units of the Left Bank of the Dniester.
↑ Other states ↑			
↓ Dependent Territories ↓			
Akrotiri and Dhekelia – Sovereign Base Areas of Akrotiri and Dhekelia	British Overseas Territory	None	
Bailiwick of Guernsey → Guernsey, Bailiwick of			
Bailiwick of Jersey → Jersey			
Faroe Islands	Danish Autonomous Territory	None	
Gibraltar	British Overseas Territory	Claimed by Spain	
Guernsey, Bailiwick of	British Crown Dependency	None	
Isle of Man	British Crown Dependency	None	
Jan Mayen	Norwegian Territory	None	
Jersey – Bailiwick of Jersey	British Crown Dependency	None	
Svalbard	Norwegian Territory	None	
Åland	Finnish Autonomous Region	None	
↑ Dependent Territories ↑			

- Transcontinental countries in Europe and Asia, classified as West Asian countries by the United Nations Statistics Division: Azerbaijan, Georgia, Kazakhstan, and Turkey (all but Kazakhstan are members of the Council of Europe).
- Entirely in West Asia, but commonly associated with Europe, and a member of the Council of Europe: Armenia and Cyprus.
- States with limited recognition, entirely in West Asia, but commonly associated with Europe: Abkhazia, North Cyprus, and South Ossetia.

== North America ==
For a table of sovereign states and dependent territories in North America with geographical data such as area, population, and population density, see North America: countries and territories.

Geologically, North America is joined with South America by the Isthmus of Panama to form the Americas.

Common and formal names	Membership within the UN System (Note: This column indicates whether or not a state is a member of the United Nations. It also indicates which non-member states participate in the United Nations System through membership in the International Atomic Energy Agency or one of the specialized agencies of the United Nations. All United Nations members belong to at least one specialized agency and are parties to the statute of the International Court of Justice.)	Sovereignty dispute (Note: This column indicates whether or not a state is the subject of a major sovereignty dispute. Only states whose entire sovereignty is disputed by another state are listed.)	Further information on status and recognition of sovereignty (Note: Information is included on: The extent to which a state's sovereignty is recognised internationally. More information can be found at List of states with limited recognition, Membership in the European Union, where applicable, Any dependencies, if applicable, which are generally not part of the territory of the sovereign state, federal structure of the state, where applicable. More information can be found at Federated state, Any autonomous areas inside the territory of the sovereign state, Any situations where one person is the Head of State of more than one state, Any governments in exile recognised by at least one state.)
↓ UN member states and General Assembly observer states ↓			
Antigua and Barbuda	UN member state	None	Antigua and Barbuda is a Commonwealth realm with one autonomous region, Barbuda.
Bahamas, The – Commonwealth of the Bahamas	UN member state	None	The Bahamas is a Commonwealth realm.
Barbados	UN member state	None	
Belize	UN member state	None	Belize is a Commonwealth realm.
Canada (Note: The legal name for Canada is the sole word; an officially sanctioned, though disused, name is Dominion of Canada (which includes its legal title); see: Name of Canada, Dominion.)	UN member state	None	Canada is a Commonwealth realm and a federation of 10 provinces and three territories.
Costa Rica – Republic of Costa Rica	UN member state	None	
Cuba – Republic of Cuba	UN member state	None	
Dominica – Commonwealth of Dominica	UN member state	None	
Dominican Republic	UN member state	None	
El Salvador – Republic of El Salvador	UN member state	None	
Grenada	UN member state	None	Grenada is a Commonwealth realm.
Guatemala – Republic of Guatemala	UN member state	None	
Haiti – Republic of Haiti	UN member state	None	
Honduras – Republic of Honduras	UN member state	None	
Jamaica	UN member state	None	Jamaica is a Commonwealth realm.
Mexico – United Mexican States	UN member state	None	Mexico is a federation of 31 states and one autonomous city. The Rebel Zapatista Autonomous Municipalities have de facto autonomy.
Nicaragua – Republic of Nicaragua	UN member state	None	Nicaragua contains two autonomous regions, Atlántico Sur and Atlántico Norte.
Panama – Republic of Panama	UN member state	None	
Saint Kitts and Nevis – Federation of Saint Christopher and Nevis	UN member state	None	Saint Kitts and Nevis is a Commonwealth realm and is a federation of two islands, St. Kitts and Nevis.
Saint Lucia	UN member state	None	Saint Lucia is a Commonwealth realm.
Saint Vincent and the Grenadines	UN member state	None	Saint Vincent and the Grenadines is a Commonwealth realm.
The Bahamas → See Bahamas, The listing			
Trinidad and Tobago – Republic of Trinidad and Tobago	UN member state	None	Trinidad and Tobago contains one autonomous region, Tobago.
United States – United States of America	UN member state	None	The United States is a federation of 50 states, one federal district, and one incorporated territory. Additionally, the Federal government of the United States has sovereignty over 13 unincorporated territories. Of these territories, the following five are inhabited possessions: American Samoa; Guam; Northern Mariana Islands; Puerto Rico; U.S. Virgin Islands; It also has sovereignty over several uninhabited territories: Baker Island; Howland Island; Jarvis Island; Johnston Atoll; Kingman Reef; Midway Atoll; Navassa Island; Wake Island; It also disputes sovereignty over the following two territories: Bajo Nuevo Bank; Serranilla Bank; Three sovereign states have become associated states of the United States under the Compact of Free Association: Marshall Islands – Republic of the Marshall Islands; Micronesia – Federated States of Micronesia; Palau – Republic of Palau
↑ UN member states and General Assembly observer states ↑			
↓ Dependent Territories ↓			
Anguilla	British Overseas Territory	None	
Aruba – Country of Aruba	Dutch Constituent Country	None	
Bermuda	British Overseas Territory	None	
Bonaire	Dutch Special Municipality	None	
British Virgin Islands – Virgin Islands	British Overseas Territory	None	
Cayman Islands	British Overseas Territory	None	
Clipperton Island	French State's Private Property	None	
Commonwealth of Puerto Rico → Puerto Rico			
Curaçao – Country of Curaçao	Dutch Constituent Country	None	
Greenland	Danish Autonomous Territory	None	
Guadeloupe	French Overseas Department and Region	None	
Martinique	French Overseas Department and Region	None	
Montserrat	British Overseas Territory	None	
Navassa Island	US Insular Area	None	
Puerto Rico – Commonwealth of Puerto Rico	US Insular Area	None	
Saba	Dutch Special Municipality	None	
Saint Barthélemy – Territorial Collectivity of Saint Barthélemy	French Overseas Collectivity	None	
Saint Martin – Collectivity of Saint Martin	French Overseas Collectivity	None	
Saint Pierre and Miquelon	French Overseas Collectivity	None	
Sint Eustatius	Dutch Special Municipality	None	
Sint Maarten	Dutch Constituent Country	None	
Turks and Caicos Islands	British Overseas Territory	None	
United States Virgin Islands – Virgin Islands of the United States	US Insular Area	None	
Virgin Islands → British Virgin Islands			
Virgin Islands of the United States → United States Virgin Islands			
↑ Dependent Territories ↑			

- Transcontinental countries in North America or South America (depending on the boundary definition), classified as South American countries by the United Nations Statistics Division: Colombia (Archipelago of San Andrés, Providencia and Santa Catalina) and Venezuela (Nueva Esparta, the Federal Dependencies of Venezuela [including Isla de Aves]).
- Transcontinental countries in Europe and North America, classified as Western European countries by the United Nations Statistics Division: Netherlands (Bonaire, Saba, and Sint Eustatius) and France (Guadeloupe and Martinique).
- States partially lying on the North American Plate, but commonly associated with Europe, and a member of the Council of Europe: Iceland, Portugal (Azores), and Russia (Commander Islands and Big Diomede).

== Oceania ==
For a table of sovereign states and dependent territories in Oceania with geographical data such as area, population, and population density, see Oceania: territories and regions.

Common and formal names	Membership within the UN System (Note: This column indicates whether or not a state is a member of the United Nations. It also indicates which non-member states participate in the United Nations System through membership in the International Atomic Energy Agency or one of the specialized agencies of the United Nations. All United Nations members belong to at least one specialized agency and are parties to the statute of the International Court of Justice.)	Sovereignty dispute (Note: This column indicates whether or not a state is the subject of a major sovereignty dispute. Only states whose entire sovereignty is disputed by another state are listed.)	Further information on status and recognition of sovereignty (Note: Information is included on: The extent to which a state's sovereignty is recognised internationally. More information can be found at List of states with limited recognition, Membership in the European Union, where applicable, Any dependencies, if applicable, which are generally not part of the territory of the sovereign state, federal structure of the state, where applicable. More information can be found at Federated state, Any autonomous areas inside the territory of the sovereign state, Any situations where one person is the Head of State of more than one state, Any governments in exile recognised by at least one state.)
↓ UN member states and General Assembly observer states ↓			
Australia – Commonwealth of Australia	UN member state	None	Australia is a Commonwealth realm and a federation of both states and territories. There are six states, three internal territories, six external territories and one claimed Antarctic external territory. The external territories of Australia are: Ashmore and Cartier Islands; Christmas Island; Cocos (Keeling) Islands; Coral Sea Islands Territory; Heard Island and McDonald Islands; Norfolk Island; Australian Antarctic Territory
Cook Islands → See Cook Islands listing			
Fiji – Republic of Fiji	UN member state	None	Fiji contains one autonomous region, Rotuma.
Indonesia – Republic of Indonesia	UN member state	None	Indonesia has eight autonomous provinces, Aceh, Jakarta, Central Papua, Highland Papua, Papua, South Papua, West Papua, and Yogyakarta.
Kiribati – Republic of Kiribati	UN member state	None	
Marshall Islands – Republic of the Marshall Islands	UN member state	None	Under Compact of Free Association with the United States.
Micronesia – Federated States of Micronesia	UN member state	None	Under Compact of Free Association with the United States. The Federated States of Micronesia is a federation of four states.
Nauru – Republic of Naoero	UN member state	None	
New Zealand	UN member state	None	New Zealand is a Commonwealth realm, and has one dependent territory and one claimed Antarctic dependent territory of: Tokelau; Ross Dependency; The Realm of New Zealand has responsibilities for (but no rights of control over) two freely associated states: Cook Islands; Niue; The Cook Islands and Niue have diplomatic relations with 63 and 25 UN members respectively. They have full treaty-making capacity in the UN, and are members of some UN specialized agencies.
Niue → See Niue listing			
Palau – Republic of Palau	UN member state	None	Under Compact of Free Association with the United States.
Papua New Guinea – Independent State of Papua New Guinea	UN member state	None	Papua New Guinea is a Commonwealth realm with one autonomous region, Bougainville.
Samoa – Independent State of Samoa	UN member state	None	
Solomon Islands	UN member state	None	The Solomon Islands is a Commonwealth realm.
Tonga – Kingdom of Tonga	UN member state	None	
Tuvalu	UN member state	None	Tuvalu is a Commonwealth realm.
Vanuatu – Republic of Vanuatu	UN member state	None	
↑ UN member states and General Assembly observer states ↑			
↓ Other states ↓			
Cook Islands	Member of eight UN specialized agencies	None (See political status)	A state in free association with New Zealand, the Cook Islands maintains diplomatic relations with 66 states. The Cook Islands is a member of multiple UN agencies with full treaty making capacity. It shares a head of state with New Zealand as well as having shared citizenship.
Niue	Member of five UN specialized agencies	None (See political status)	A state in free association with New Zealand, Niue maintains diplomatic relations with 27 states. Niue is a member of multiple UN agencies with full treaty making capacity. It shares a head of state with New Zealand as well as having shared citizenship.
↑ Other states ↑			
↓ Dependent Territories ↓			
American Samoa – Territory of American Samoa	US Insular Area	None	
Ashmore and Cartier Islands – Territory of Ashmore and Cartier Islands	Australian External Territory	Claimed by Indonesia	
Baker Island	US Insular Area	None	
Christmas Island – Territory of Christmas Island	Australian External Territory	None	
Clipperton Island	French State's Private Property	None	
Cocos (Keeling) Islands – Territory of Cocos (Keeling) Islands	Australian External Territory	None	
Commonwealth of the Northern Mariana Islands → Northern Mariana Islands			
Coral Sea Islands – Coral Sea Islands Territory	Australian External Territory	None	
French Polynesia – Overseas Lands of French Polynesia	French Overseas Collectivity	None	
French Southern and Antarctic Lands	French Overseas Territory	None	
Guam – Territory of Guam	US Insular Area	None	
Heard Island and McDonald Islands – Territory of Heard Island and McDonald Islands	Australian External Territory	None	
Howland Island	US Insular Area	None	
Jarvis Island	US Insular Area	None	
Johnston Atoll	US Insular Area	None	
Kingman Reef	US Insular Area	None	
Midway Atoll	US Insular Area	None	
New Caledonia – Territory of New Caledonia and Dependencies	French Sui Generis Collectivity	None	
Norfolk Island – Territory of Norfolk Island	Australian External Territory	None	
Northern Mariana Islands – Commonwealth of the Northern Mariana Islands	US Insular Area	None	
Palmyra Atoll	US Insular Area	None	
Pitcairn Islands – Pitcairn Group of Islands	British Overseas Territory	None	
Tokelau	New Zealand Dependent Territory	None	
Wake Island	US Insular Area	Claimed by the Marshall Islands	
Wallis and Futuna – Territory of the Wallis and Futuna Islands	French Overseas Collectivity	None	
↑ Dependent Territories ↑			

- Transcontinental country in Asia and Oceania, classified as an Eastern Asian country by the United Nations Statistics Division: Japan (Ogasawara [also known as the Bonin Islands or as the Nanpō Islands]).
- Transcontinental country in Asia and Oceania, classified as a Southeastern Asian country by the United Nations Statistics Division: Indonesia (Maluku Islands and Western New Guinea).
- Entirely in Southeast Asia, but commonly associated with Oceania, and lying east of the biogeographical Wallace Line: East Timor.
- Transcontinental country in North America and Oceania, classified as a Northern American country by the United Nations Statistics Division: United States (Hawaii).
- Transcontinental countries in Oceania and South America, classified as South American countries by the United Nations Statistics Division: Chile (Insular Chile) and Ecuador (Galápagos Islands).

== South America ==
For a table of sovereign states and dependent territories in South America with geographical data such as area, population, and population density, see South America: demographics.

Geologically, South America is joined with North America by the Isthmus of Panama to form the Americas.

Common and formal names	Membership within the UN System (Note: This column indicates whether or not a state is a member of the United Nations. It also indicates which non-member states participate in the United Nations System through membership in the International Atomic Energy Agency or one of the specialized agencies of the United Nations. All United Nations members belong to at least one specialized agency and are parties to the statute of the International Court of Justice.)	Sovereignty dispute (Note: This column indicates whether or not a state is the subject of a major sovereignty dispute. Only states whose entire sovereignty is disputed by another state are listed.)	Further information on status and recognition of sovereignty (Note: Information is included on: The extent to which a state's sovereignty is recognised internationally. More information can be found at List of states with limited recognition, Membership in the European Union, where applicable, Any dependencies, if applicable, which are generally not part of the territory of the sovereign state, federal structure of the state, where applicable. More information can be found at Federated state, Any autonomous areas inside the territory of the sovereign state, Any situations where one person is the Head of State of more than one state, Any governments in exile recognised by at least one state.)
↓ UN member states and General Assembly observer states ↓			
Argentina – Argentine Republic (Note: The Argentine Constitution (Art. 35) recognises the following denominations for Argentina: "United Provinces of the Río de la Plata", "Argentine Republic" and "Argentine Confederation"; furthermore, it establishes the usage of "Argentine Nation" for purposes of legislation.)	UN member state	None	Argentina is a federation of 23 provinces and one autonomous city. (Note: Argentina's claimed Antarctic territory of Argentine Antarctica (Antártida Argentina) is one of five constituent departments of the province Tierra del Fuego.)
Bolivia – Plurinational State of Bolivia	UN member state	None	
Brazil – Federative Republic of Brazil	UN member state	None	Brazil is a federation of 26 states and one federal district.
Chile – Republic of Chile	UN member state	None	(Note: Chile's claimed Antarctic territory of the Chilean Antarctic (Antártica Chilena) is a commune of the Antártica Chilena Province of the Magallanes Region.)
Colombia – Republic of Colombia	UN member state	None	
Ecuador – Republic of Ecuador	UN member state	None	
Guyana – Co-operative Republic of Guyana	UN member state	None	
Paraguay – Republic of Paraguay	UN member state	None	
Peru – Republic of Peru	UN member state	None	
Suriname – Republic of Suriname	UN member state	None	
Uruguay – Oriental Republic of Uruguay	UN member state	None	
Venezuela – Bolivarian Republic of Venezuela	UN member state	None	Venezuela is a federation of 23 states, one capital district, and federal dependencies.
↑ UN member states and General Assembly observer states ↑			
↓ Dependent Territories ↓			
Bouvet Island	Norwegian Dependent Territory	None	
Falklands – Falkland Islands	British Overseas Territory	Claimed by Argentina	
French Guiana – Guiana	French Overseas Department and Region	None	
Saint Helena, Ascension and Tristan da Cunha	British Overseas Territory	None	
South Georgia and the South Sandwich Islands	British Overseas Territory	Claimed by Argentina	
↑ Dependent Territories ↑			

- Transcontinental country in North America and South America, classified as a Central American country by the United Nations Statistics Division: Panama (South East Panama).
- Transcontinental island countries and dependencies in South America or North America (depending on the boundary definition), classified as Caribbean countries and dependencies by the United Nations Statistics Division: Aruba, Curaçao, and Trinidad and Tobago (Only Trinidad and Tobago is an independent state).
- Transcontinental countries in Europe and South America, classified as Western European countries by the United Nations Statistics Division: Netherlands (Bonaire) and France (French Guiana).

== Antarctica ==
Antarctica is regulated by the Antarctic Treaty System, which defines it as all land and ice shelves south of 60°S, and has no government and belongs to no country. However, the following territorial claims in Antarctica have been made:

- Argentina: Argentine Antarctica
- Australia: Australian Antarctic Territory
- Chile: Chilean Antarctic Territory
- France: Adélie Land (part of the French Southern and Antarctic Lands)
- New Zealand: Ross Dependency
- Norway: Peter I Island and Queen Maud Land
- United Kingdom: British Antarctic Territory
- Terra nullius: Marie Byrd Land (unclaimed territory)

Russia and the United States have reserved the right to claim territory on Antarctica.

=== Subantarctic islands ===
Unlike Antarctica itself, other nearby Subantarctic island territories most commonly associated with the Antarctic continent, but lying north of 60°S, have had full sovereignty established over them by a governing state.

The following dependent territories are situated within the wider Antarctic region, but are not directly part of the Antarctic Treaty System:

Flag	Name	Status	Region	Capital
Bouvet Island	Bouvet Island	Dependency of Norway	Atlantic Ocean	—
French Southern and Antarctic Lands	French Southern and Antarctic Lands	Overseas territory of France	Indian Ocean	Alfred Faure (Crozet Islands); Port-aux-Français (Kerguelen Islands, largest settlement); Martin-de-Viviès (Saint Paul and Amsterdam Islands, unofficial)
Heard Island and McDonald Islands	Heard Island and McDonald Islands	External territory of Australia	Indian Ocean	None
South Georgia and the South Sandwich Islands	South Georgia and the South Sandwich Islands	British overseas territory	Atlantic Ocean	King Edward Point

In addition to the dependent territories listed above, the following islands are governed as a direct part of a controlling state. Thus they are fully and legally integrated within the governance structure of the respective state. They are similarly also not part of the Antarctic Treaty System.

Administering Country	Name	Status	Region	Subdivisions
Australia	Macquarie Island	Part of the State of Tasmania.	Oceania	—
New Zealand	New Zealand Subantarctic Islands	Governed directly, not within local municipal structure.	Oceania	The Antipodes Islands, the Auckland Islands, the Bounty Islands, the Campbell Islands, and the Snares Islands.
South Africa	Prince Edward Islands	Part of the City of Cape Town.	Africa	Prince Edward Island and Marion Island.

== See also ==
- Boundaries between the continents of Earth
- Continental union
- Gallery of dependent territory flags
- Gallery of sovereign state flags
- List of countries by United Nations geoscheme
- List of dependent territories
- List of sovereign states
- List of sovereign states and dependent territories by continent (data file) — this data in a plain text format suitable for automated processing
