= List of diplomatic missions of Transnistria =

This article lists the diplomatic missions of Transnistria. Transnistria is a state with limited recognition, that broke away from Moldova after the War of Transnistria in 1992. Transnistria did not receive recognition from any UN member states. It has been recognized as an independent state by Abkhazia, Nagorno-Karabakh and South Ossetia only. At present, Transnistria has three representative offices abroad.

== Europe ==
- Abkhazia
  - Sukhumi (Representative office)
- Russia
  - Moscow (Official Diplomatic Bureau)
- South Ossetia
  - Tskhinvali (Representative office)

== See also ==
- Foreign relations of Transnistria
- List of diplomatic missions in Transnistria
