= List of diplomatic missions in Transnistria =

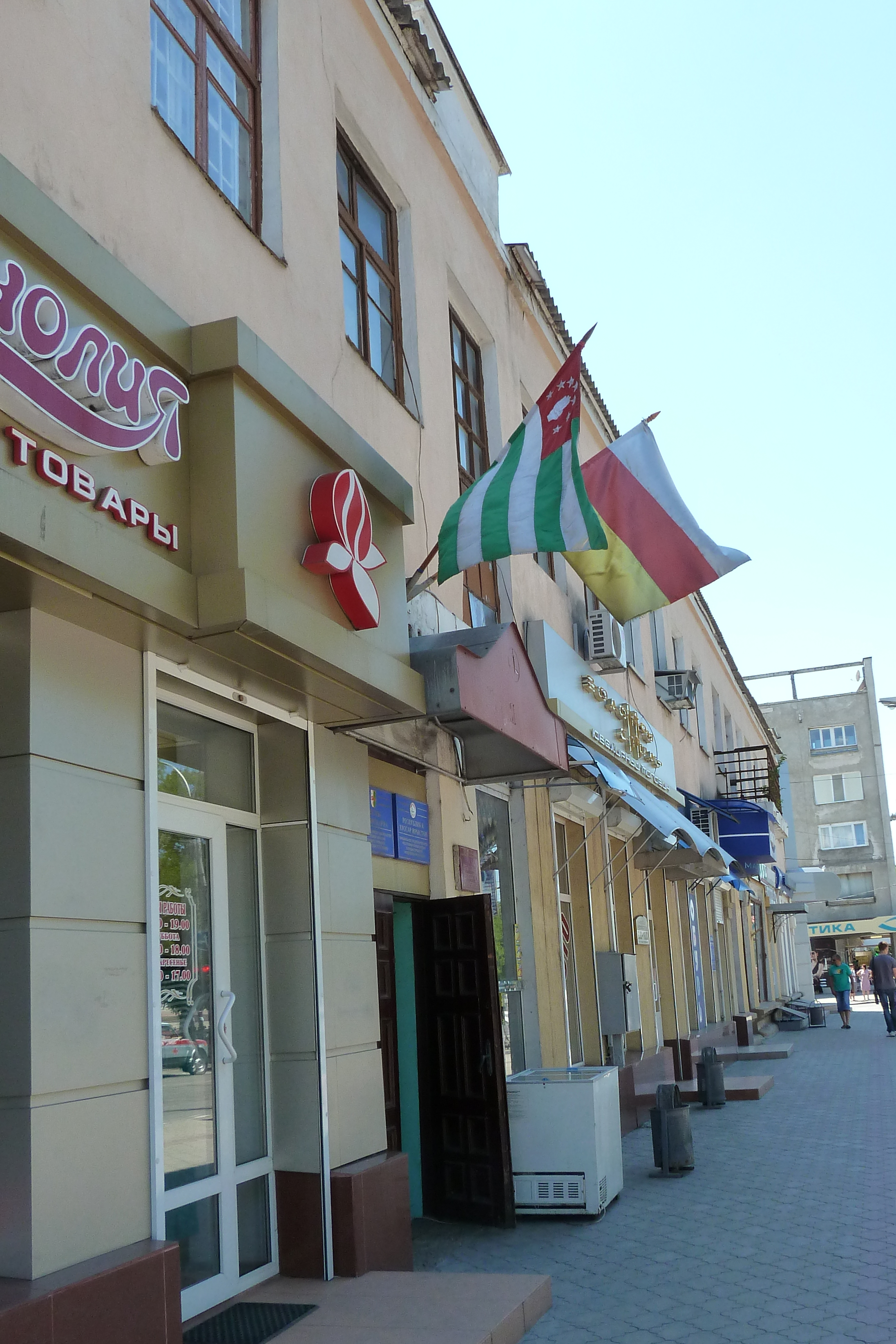
Representations of Abkhazia and South Ossetia in Tiraspol, Transnistria

This article lists the diplomatic missions in Transnistria. Transnistria is a state with limited recognition, that broke away from Moldova after the War of Transnistria in 1992. Transnistria did not receive recognition from any UN member states. It has been recognized as independent state by Abkhazia, Nagorno-Karabakh and South Ossetia only. At present, the capital Tiraspol hosts no embassies, but two representative offices and one consulate.

== Embassies ==
Tiraspol

- None

== Representative offices ==
Tiraspol

- Abkhazia
- South Ossetia

== Consulates ==
Tiraspol

- Russia (Consular office)

== See also ==
- Foreign relations of Transnistria
- List of diplomatic missions of Transnistria
