= Artsakh–Transnistria relations =

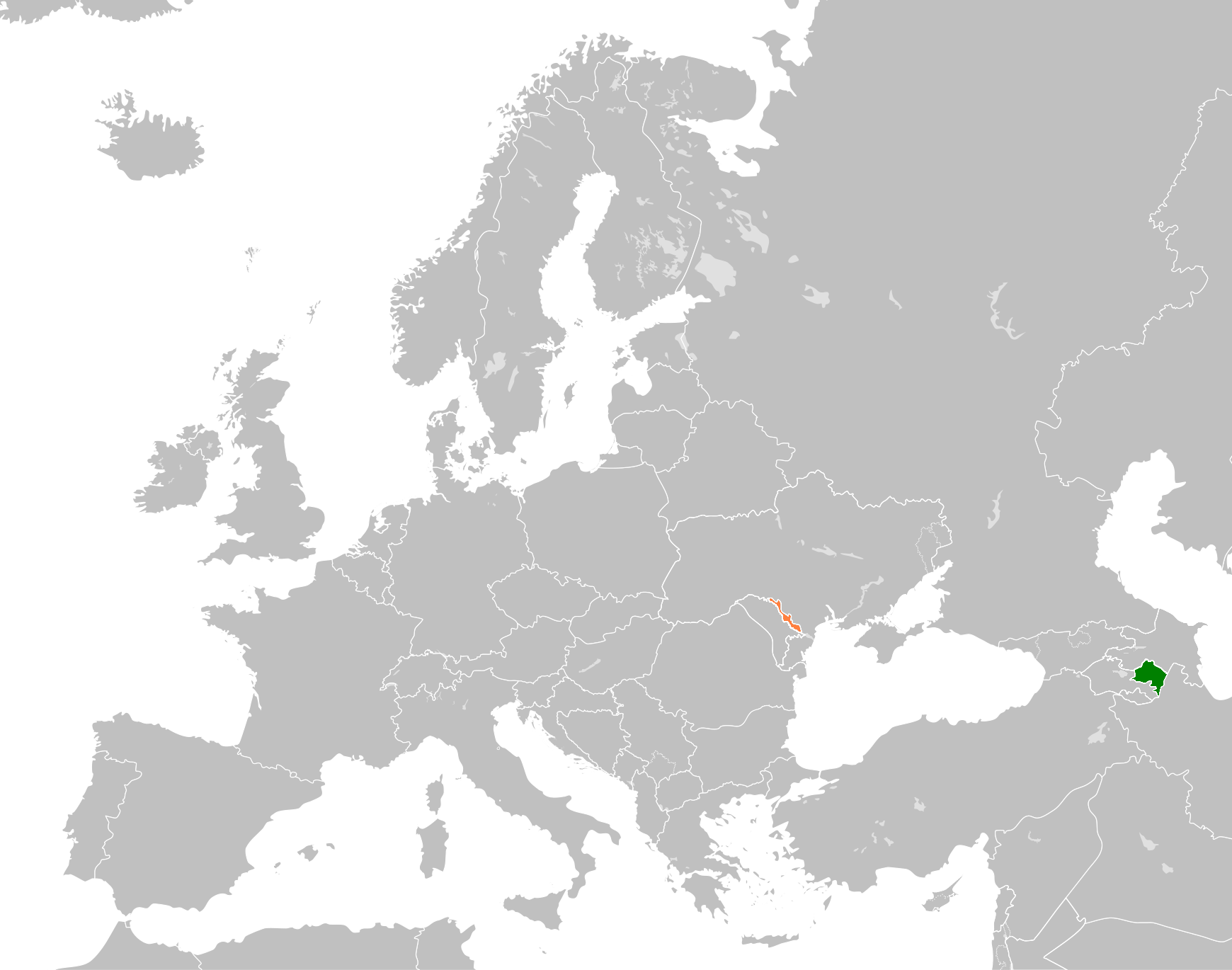

- Republic of Artsakh: Transnistria

Artsakh–Transnistria relations were the foreign relations between the unrecognised republics of Artsakh and Transnistria (officially known as the Pridnestrovian Moldavian Republic). Both countries officially established diplomatic relations on 4 July 2001 and recognized each other's independence. Both states were members of the Community for Democracy and Rights of Nations.

== History ==
On 4 July 2001, both countries signed the "Protocol on Cooperation and Consultations between the Ministry of Foreign Affairs of the Pridnestrovien Moldavian Republic and the Ministry of Foreign Affairs of the Nagorno-Karabakh Republic" in Stepanakert, the capital of Artsakh.

On 23 November 2018, a delegation from Transnistria visited the Republic of Artsakh. Again in Stepanakert, the Vice Prime Minister of Transnistria Aleksey Tsurkan met the State Minister of Artsakh Grigory Martirosyan, where a trade agreement was signed between the two countries.

On 28 September 2020, the Ministry of Foreign Affairs of Transnistria stated that it hoped a resolution would be found for the Second Nagorno-Karabakh War confronting Azerbaijan against Armenia and Artsakh. It condemned military actions and expressed sympathy for the "brotherly people" of Artsakh and admiration for the "courage and steadfastness" of the population of Armenia and Artsakh. Later, on 3 October, it was announced that Transnistria would open a financial aid fund for Artsakh. It was started by the Armenian minority of the country.

== See also ==
- Foreign relations of Artsakh (international recognition)
- Foreign relations of Transnistria (international recognition)
