= Forgotten continent =

Forgotten continent may refer to:

== Hypothetical continents ==
- Atlantis, mythical ancient submerged continent.
- Kumari Kandam
- Lemuria, hypothetical continent in the Indian Ocean.
- Meropis
- Mu, often called the lost continent.
- Terra Australis, mystical southern land, now confirmed as Antarctica.

== Submerged continents ==
- Kerguelen Plateau, prehistoric continent, almost entirely submerged except for the Desolation Islands.
- Zealandia, prehistoric continent, almost entirely submerged except for the islands of New Zealand, New Caledonia, and some Australian islands.
- Doggerland, prehistoric landmass Located between Great Britain and Western Europe

== Geological supercontinents ==
- Columbia
- Gondwana
- Kenorland
- Laurasia
- Nena
- Pangaea
- Pannotia
- Rodinia
- Ur
- Vaalbara

== Other Prehistoric continents ==
- Arctica
- Asiamerica
- Atlantica
- Avalonia
- Baltica
- Cimmeria
- Congo craton
- Euramerica
- Kalaharia
- Kazakhstania
- Laurentia
- North China
- Siberia
- South China
- East Antarctica
- India

== Use today ==
- Antarctica, the unsettled continent.
- Africa, the undeveloped continent.
- South America, along with Central America, is often overlooked by Western powers.

== See also ==
- Lost lands
