= Foreign relations of Transnistria =

Nations with which Transnistria has diplomatic relations. Although, a physical diplomatic mission is absent for any of the de facto states.

The Transnistrian republic is recognized by two states with limited recognition, and is a member of one international organization, the Community for Democracy and Human Rights.

== Soviet and Russian heritage ==
During the perestroika years, the Soviet KGB was suspected of fostering independence movements over the right bank of the Dnester River, and in another Moldovan region, Gagauzia, home to a Turkic minority. The KGB's aim was suspected to be using these movements to restrain and hamper Moldovan desire for independence. Although Ukraine's historical claim to Transnistria was equally as strong, Soviet/Russian military leaders in Transnistria (including those of the 14th Guards Combined Arms Army) tried to claim that the region was "part of Russia," despite the hundreds of miles of Ukraine which separated Transnistria from Russia.

Following the collapse of the Soviet Union, Russia repeatedly acted in ways that denied the former Soviet republics, including Moldova, their sovereignty and right to exist. Transnistria broke away from Moldova with the assistance of the 14th Guards Army following a brief but intense war in 1992. Supporting the Transnistrian separatists formed part of this imperial agenda. Transnistria, which declared independence from Moldova in 1990 but has not been recognized by the United Nations, has been heavily reliant on Russian support for its survival and de facto independence. Russia has continued to provide strong political support, recognizing its government and offering diplomatic backing in international forums. This support has been critical in sustaining Transnistria's de facto independence from Moldova.

Since then, it has maintained a close relationship with Russia, which has included economic aid, political support, and the presence of Russian military forces in the territory.

The 14th Guards Army decayed down into the Operational Group of Russian Forces which was primarily composed of Transnistrian troops and was separate from the Russian "peacekeeping troops" also in the territory.

Transnistria's economy has heavily depended on Russian subsidies and support. Throughout 2022–2023, Russia reportedly increased its economic aid to Transnistria, helping to stabilize the breakaway region's economy amid global economic challenges. This aid has included direct financial support, subsidies for natural gas, and other economic benefits.

== Diplomatic relations ==
Entity	Date of recognition	Diplomatic relations established	Notes
Abkhazia	22 January 1993 or before (Note: The date, when Abkhazia, South Ossetia and Transnistria recognize each other is not clear. Abkhazia and Transnistria signed a Treaty on Friendship and Cooperation on 22 January 1993, South Ossetia and Transnistria signed a Treaty on Friendship and Cooperation on 12 October 1994.)	22 January 1993	See also: Abkhazia–Transnistria relations Mutual recognition. Representative offices in Tiraspol and Sukhumi.
South Ossetia	12 October 1994 or before	–	See also: South Ossetia–Transnistria relations Mutual recognition. Representative offices in Tiraspol and Tskhinvali.

In addition to official diplomatic relations, Transnistria uses specific tools to enact external political relations via public diplomacy. For instance, the Transnistrian President established the state award Order of Friendship (Орден Дружбы) in 2012 to primarily decorate foreigners; it has since then been bestowed upon individual recipients (mainly politicians) from Russia, Abkhazia, South Ossetia, Italy, and the Catholic Church.

== Former diplomatic relations ==
Entity	Date of recognition	Diplomatic relations established	Diplomatic relations ended	Notes
(Republic of Artsakh) Artsakh	4 July 2001	4 July 2001	28 September 2023	See also: Artsakh–Transnistria relations Mutual recognition. Representative offices in Tiraspol and Stepanakert.

=== Republic of Artsakh ===
From 4 July 2001 to 28 September 2023, Transnistria and the Republic of Artsakh, mutually recognized each other and had diplomatic relations. Artsakh was also a member of the ″Community for Democracy and Rights of Nations". This state of affair ended when Artsakh was conquered by Azerbaijan and the state had formally declared capitulation on 28 September 2023.

== See also ==
- International recognition of Transnistria
- List of diplomatic missions of Transnistria
- List of diplomatic missions in Transnistria
- Political status of Transnistria
