= Outline of Oceania =

Overview of and topical guide to Oceania

Location of Oceania

The following outline is provided as an overview and topical guide to Oceania.

Oceania is a geographical, and geopolitical, region consisting of numerous lands—mostly islands in the Pacific Ocean and vicinity. The term is also sometimes used to denote a continent comprising Australia and proximate Pacific islands.

The boundaries of Oceania are defined in a number of ways. Most definitions include parts of Australasia such as Australia, New Zealand, and New Guinea, and parts of Maritime Southeast Asia. Ethnologically, the islands of Oceania are divided into the subregions of Melanesia, Micronesia, and Polynesia.

== General reference ==
- Pronunciation (IPA)
  - UK: /ˌəʊ.ʃiˈɑːn.(iː.)ə/
  - US: /ˌoʊʃiˈæniə/
- Common English name(s): Oceania, Oceanica
- Official English name(s): Oceania
- Adjectival(s): Oceanian
- Demonym(s): Oceanians

== Geography of Oceania ==
Geography of Oceania

- Oceania is
  - A geopolitical and geographical region
  - One of the eight terrestrial realms
- Location
  - Pacific Ocean
    - Mostly in the South Pacific
  - Extreme points of Oceania
    - Elevation extremes
      - Highest point: Puncak Jaya in Papua at 4,884 m (16,024 ft)
      - Lowest point: Lake Eyre, Australia at 16 m (52 ft) below sea level
    - Southernmost points of Oceania
    - Extreme points by region
      - Extreme points of Australasia
        - Extreme points of Australia
        - Extreme points of New Zealand
        - Extreme points of Papua New Guinea
- Population of Oceania: 34,748,972
- Atlas of Oceania

=== Geography of Oceania by region ===
- Geography of Melanesia
- Geography of Micronesia
- Geography of Polynesia

==== Geography of Oceania by country and territory ====
- Geography of American Samoa
- Geography of the Ashmore and Cartier Islands (Australia)
- Geography of Australia
- Geography of the Cook Islands(New Zealand)
- Geography of the Coral Sea Islands (Australia)
- Geography of Easter Island (Chile)
- Geography of Fiji
- Geography of French Polynesia (France)
- Geography of Guam (United States)
- Geography of Hawaii(United States)
- Geography of Indonesia
- Geography of Kiribati
- Geography of the Marshall Islands
- Geography of the Federated States of Micronesia
- Geography of Nauru
- Geography of New Caledonia (France)
- Geography of New Zealand
- Geography of Niue (New Zealand)
- Geography of Norfolk Island (Australia)
- Geography of the Northern Mariana Islands (United States)
- Geography of Palau
- Geography of Papua New Guinea
- Geography of the Pitcairn Islands (United Kingdom)
- Geography of Samoa
- Geography of the Solomon Islands
- Geography of Tokelau (New Zealand)
- Geography of Tonga
- Geography of Tuvalu
- Geography of Vanuatu
- Geography of Wallis and Futuna (France)
- United States Minor Outlying Islands:
  - Geography of Baker Island
  - Geography of Howland Island
  - Geography of Jarvis Island
  - Geography of Johnston Atoll
  - Geography of Kingman Reef
  - Geography of Midway Atoll
  - Geography of Palmyra Atoll
  - Geography of Wake Island

=== Environment of Oceania ===
Environment of Oceania

==== Climate of Oceania ====
- Climate of American Samoa
- Climate of the Ashmore and Cartier Islands (Australia)
- Climate of Australia
- Climate of the Cook Islands(New Zealand)
- Climate of the Coral Sea Islands (Australia)
- Climate of Easter Island (Chile)
- Climate of Fiji
- Climate of French Polynesia (France)
- Climate of Guam (United States)
- Climate of Hawaii (United States)
- Climate of Indonesia
- Climate of Kiribati
- Climate of the Marshall Islands
- Climate of the Federated States of Micronesia
- Climate of Nauru
- Climate of New Caledonia (France)
- Climate of New Zealand
- Climate of Niue (New Zealand)
- Climate of Norfolk Island (Australia)
- Climate of the Northern Mariana Islands (United States)
- Climate of Palau
- Climate of Papua New Guinea
- Climate of the Pitcairn Islands (United Kingdom)
- Climate of Samoa
- Climate of the Solomon Islands
- Climate of Tokelau (New Zealand)
- Climate of Tonga
- Climate of Tuvalu
- Climate of Vanuatu
- Climate of Wallis and Futuna (France)
- United States Minor Outlying Islands:
  - Climate of Baker Island
  - Climate of Howland Island
  - Climate of Jarvis Island
  - Climate of Johnston Atoll
  - Climate of Kingman Reef
  - Climate of Midway Atoll
  - Climate of Palmyra Atoll
  - Climate of Wake Island

==== Ecology of Oceania ====
- Ecology of the Ashmore and Cartier Islands (Australia)
- Ecology of Easter Island (Chile)
- Ecology of Indonesia

==== Geology of Oceania ====
- Geology of Australia
- Geology of Easter Island (Chile)
- Geology of Indonesia
- Geology of Nauru
- Geology of New Zealand

==== Wildlife of Oceania ====
- Wildlife of Oceanian realm

===== Flora of Oceania =====
- Flora of Oceanian realm

===== Fauna of Oceania =====
- Fauna of Oceanian realm
- Birds of Oceania
- Mammals of Oceania

==== Natural geographic features of Oceania ====
- Islands of Oceania
  - Islands of Australasia
    - Islands of Australia
    - Islands of New Zealand
  - Islands of Melanesia
  - Islands of Micronesia
  - Islands of Polynesia
- Mountains of Oceania
  - Ultras in Oceania
- Rivers of Oceania
- Rock formations in Oceania

=== Regions of Oceania ===
Regions of Oceania

- Near Oceania
- Remote Oceania
- United Nations geoscheme for Oceania

==== Biogeographic divisions of Oceania ====
- Realms of Oceania
  - Oceanian realm
  - Australasian realm

==== Political divisions of Oceania ====
Sovereign states and dependencies (listed in italic) that have at least some territory lying within Oceania:

- American Samoa
- (Australia) Ashmore and Cartier Islands
- Australia
- Cook Islands
- (Australia) Coral Sea Islands
- Easter Island
- Fiji
- French Polynesia
- Guam
- Hawaii
- Indonesia
- Kiribati
- Marshall Islands
- Federated States of Micronesia
- Nauru
- New Caledonia
- New Zealand
- Niue
- Norfolk Island
- Northern Mariana Islands
- Palau
- Papua New Guinea
- Pitcairn Islands
- Samoa
- Solomon Islands
- Timor-Leste
- Tokelau
- Tonga
- Tuvalu
- Vanuatu
- Wallis and Futuna
- United States Minor Outlying Islands:
  - Baker Island
  - Howland Island
  - Jarvis Island
  - Johnston Atoll
  - Kingman Reef
  - Midway Atoll
  - Palmyra Atoll
  - Wake Island

===== Municipalities of Oceania =====
- Cities of Oceania
  - Chinatowns in Oceania
  - Twin towns and sister cities in Oceania

=== Demography of Oceania ===
Demographics of Oceania

- Demographics of American Samoa
- Demographics of the Ashmore and Cartier Islands (Australia)
- Demographics of Australia
- Demographics of the Cook Islands(New Zealand)
- Demographics of the Coral Sea Islands (Australia)
- Demographics of Easter Island (Chile)
- Demographics of Fiji
- Demographics of French Polynesia (France)
- Demographics of Guam (United States)
- Demographics of Hawaii(United States)
- Demographics of Indonesia
- Demographics of Kiribati
- Demographics of the Marshall Islands
- Demographics of the Federated States of Micronesia
- Demographics of Nauru
- Demographics of New Caledonia (France)
- Demographics of New Zealand
- Demographics of Niue (New Zealand)
- Demographics of Norfolk Island (Australia)
- Demographics of the Northern Mariana Islands (United States)
- Demographics of Palau
- Demographics of Papua New Guinea
- Demographics of the Pitcairn Islands (United Kingdom)
- Demographics of Samoa
- Demographics of Solomon Islands
- Demographics of Tokelau (New Zealand)
- Demographics of Tonga
- Demographics of Tuvalu
- Demographics of Vanuatu
- Demographics of Wallis and Futuna (France)
- United States Minor Outlying Islands:
  - Demographics of Baker Island
  - Demographics of Howland Island
  - Demographics of Jarvis Island
  - Demographics of Johnston Atoll
  - Demographics of Kingman Reef
  - Demographics of Midway Atoll
  - Demographics of Palmyra Atoll
  - Demographics of Wake Island

== Politics of Oceania ==
=== Politics of Oceania by region ===
- Politics of American Samoa
- Politics of the Ashmore and Cartier Islands (Australia)
- Politics of Australia
- Politics of the Cook Islands(New Zealand)
- Politics of the Coral Sea Islands (Australia)
- Politics of Easter Island (Chile)
- Politics of Fiji
- Politics of French Polynesia (France)
- Politics of Guam (United States)
- Politics of Hawaii(United States)
- Politics of Indonesia
- Politics of Kiribati
- Politics of the Marshall Islands
- Politics of the Federated States of Micronesia
- Politics of Nauru
- Politics of New Caledonia (France)
- Politics of New Zealand
- Politics of Niue (New Zealand)
- Politics of Norfolk Island (Australia)
- Politics of the Northern Mariana Islands (United States)
- Politics of Palau
- Politics of Papua New Guinea
- Politics of the Pitcairn Islands (United Kingdom)
- Politics of Samoa
- Politics of the Solomon Islands
- Politics of Tokelau (New Zealand)
- Politics of Tonga
- Politics of Tuvalu
- Politics of Vanuatu
- Politics of Wallis and Futuna (France)
- United States Minor Outlying Islands:
  - Politics of Baker Island
  - Politics of Howland Island
  - Politics of Jarvis Island
  - Politics of Johnston Atoll
  - Politics of Kingman Reef
  - Politics of Midway Atoll
  - Politics of Palmyra Atoll
  - Politics of Wake Island

=== Governments of the countries and dependencies of Oceania ===
- Monarchies in Oceania
- Government of American Samoa
- Government of the Ashmore and Cartier Islands (Australia)
- Government of Australia
- Government of the Cook Islands(New Zealand)
- Government of the Coral Sea Islands (Australia)
- Government of Easter Island (Chile)
- Government of Fiji
- Government of French Polynesia (France)
- Government of Guam (United States)
- Government of Hawaii(United States)
- Government of Indonesia
- Government of Kiribati
- Government of the Marshall Islands
- Government of the Federated States of Micronesia
- Government of Nauru
- Government of New Caledonia (France)
- Government of New Zealand
- Government of Niue (New Zealand)
- Government of Norfolk Island (Australia)
- Government of the Northern Mariana Islands (United States)
- Government of Palau
- Government of Papua New Guinea
- Government of the Pitcairn Islands (United Kingdom)
- Government of Samoa
- Government of the Solomon Islands
- Government of Tokelau (New Zealand)
- Government of Tonga
- Government of Tuvalu
- Government of Vanuatu
- Government of Wallis and Futuna (France)
- United States Minor Outlying Islands:
  - Government of Baker Island
  - Government of Howland Island
  - Government of Jarvis Island
  - Government of Johnston Atoll
  - Government of Kingman Reef
  - Government of Midway Atoll
  - Government of Palmyra Atoll
  - Government of Wake Island

=== Elections in Oceania ===
- Elections in American Samoa
- Elections in the Ashmore and Cartier Islands (Australia)
- Elections in Australia
- Elections in the Cook Islands(New Zealand)
- Elections in the Coral Sea Islands (Australia)
- Elections in Easter Island (Chile)
- Elections in Fiji
- Elections in French Polynesia (France)
- Elections in Guam (United States)
- Elections in Hawaii(United States)
- Elections in Indonesia
- Elections in Kiribati
- Elections in the Marshall Islands
- Elections in the Federated States of Micronesia
- Elections in Nauru
- Elections in New Caledonia (France)
- Elections in New Zealand
- Elections in Niue (New Zealand)
- Elections in Norfolk Island (Australia)
- Elections in the Northern Mariana Islands (United States)
- Elections in Palau
- Elections in Papua New Guinea
- Elections in the Pitcairn Islands (United Kingdom)
- Elections in Samoa
- Elections in the Solomon Islands
- Elections in Tokelau (New Zealand)
- Elections in Tonga
- Elections in Tuvalu
- Elections in Vanuatu
- Elections in Wallis and Futuna (France)
- United States Minor Outlying Islands:
  - Elections in Baker Island
  - Elections in Howland Island
  - Elections in Jarvis Island
  - Elections in Johnston Atoll
  - Elections in Kingman Reef
  - Elections in Midway Atoll
  - Elections in Palmyra Atoll
  - Elections in Wake Island

=== Political parties in Oceania ===
- Political parties in Oceania
- Political parties in Australia
- Political parties in the Cook Islands(New Zealand)
- Political parties in Fiji
- Political parties in Indonesia
- Political parties in Kiribati
- Political parties in the Marshall Islands
- Political parties in the Federated States of Micronesia
- Political parties in Nauru
- Political parties in New Zealand
- Political parties in Niue (New Zealand)
- Political parties in Palau
- Political parties in Papua New Guinea
- Political parties in Samoa
- Political parties in the Solomon Islands
- Political parties in Tonga
- Political parties in Tuvalu
- Political parties in Vanuatu

=== Foreign relations of Oceania ===
Foreign relations of Oceania

- Foreign relations of Australia
- Foreign relations of the Cook Islands(New Zealand)
- Foreign relations of Fiji
- Foreign relations of Indonesia
- Foreign relations of Kiribati
- Foreign relations of the Marshall Islands
- Foreign relations of the Federated States of Micronesia
- Foreign relations of Nauru
- Foreign relations of New Zealand
- Foreign relations of Niue (New Zealand)
- Foreign relations of Palau
- Foreign relations of Papua New Guinea
- Foreign relations of Samoa
- Foreign relations of Solomon Islands
- Foreign relations of Tokelau (New Zealand)
- Foreign relations of Tonga
- Foreign relations of Tuvalu
- Foreign relations of Vanuatu

==== Diplomatic missions of Oceania ====
- Diplomatic missions of Australia
- Diplomatic missions of the Cook Islands(New Zealand)
- Diplomatic missions of Fiji
- Diplomatic missions of Indonesia
- Diplomatic missions of Kiribati
- Diplomatic missions of the Marshall Islands
- Diplomatic missions of the Federated States of Micronesia
- Diplomatic missions of Nauru
- Diplomatic missions of New Zealand
- Diplomatic missions of Palau
- Diplomatic missions of Papua New Guinea
- Diplomatic missions of Samoa
- Diplomatic missions of the Solomon Islands
- Diplomatic missions of Tonga
- Diplomatic missions of Tuvalu
- Diplomatic missions of Vanuatu

==== International organizations of Oceania ====
- Asia-Pacific Economic Cooperation
- Australian Doctors International
- Council of Regional Organisations in the Pacific
- Gamelan Council
- ITUC-Asia Pacific
- Pacific Islands Forum
- Pacific Islands Trade and Investment Commission
- Pacific Regional Environment Programme
- Secretariat of the Pacific Community
- South Pacific Applied Geoscience Commission

=== Law and order in Oceania ===
Law of Oceania

- Ages of consent in Oceania
- Human rights in Oceania
  - LGBT rights in Oceania

=== Military of Oceania ===
- Military history of Oceania
- Military of American Samoa
- Military of Australia
- Military of the Cook Islands(New Zealand)
- Military of Fiji
- Military of Indonesia
- Military of Kiribati
- Military of the Marshall Islands
- Military of the Federated States of Micronesia
- Military of Nauru
- Military of New Caledonia (France)
- Military of New Zealand
- Military of Norfolk Island (Australia)
- Military of the Northern Mariana Islands (United States)
- Military of Palau
- Military of Papua New Guinea
- Military of Samoa
- Military of the Solomon Islands
- Military of Tonga
- Military of Tuvalu
- Military of Vanuatu
- Military of Wallis and Futuna (France)
- United States Minor Outlying Islands:
  - Military of Baker Island
  - Military of Howland Island
  - Military of Jarvis Island
  - Military of Johnston Atoll
  - Military of Kingman Reef
  - Military of Midway Atoll
  - Military of Palmyra Atoll
  - Military of Wake Island

=== Local government in Oceania ===
Local government in Oceania

== History of Oceania ==
History of Oceania

- Timeline of the history of Oceania
- Current events of Oceania

=== History of Oceania by period ===
- 2006 in Oceania
- 2007
  - January 2007 in Oceania
- 2009
  - 2009 flu pandemic in Oceania

=== History of Oceania by region ===
- History of American Samoa
- History of the Ashmore and Cartier Islands (Australia)
- History of Australia
- History of the Cook Islands(New Zealand)
- History of the Coral Sea Islands (Australia)
- History of Easter Island (Chile)
- History of Fiji
- History of French Polynesia (France)
- History of Guam (United States)
- History of Hawaii(United States)
- History of Indonesia
- History of Kiribati
- History of the Marshall Islands
- History of the Federated States of Micronesia
- History of Nauru
- History of New Caledonia (France)
- History of New Zealand
- History of Niue (New Zealand)
- History of Norfolk Island (Australia)
- History of the Northern Mariana Islands (United States)
- History of Palau
- History of Papua New Guinea
- History of the Pitcairn Islands (United Kingdom)
- History of Samoa
- History of Solomon Islands
- History of Tokelau (New Zealand)
- History of Tonga
- History of Tuvalu
- History of Vanuatu
- History of Wallis and Futuna (France)
- United States Minor Outlying Islands:
  - History of Baker Island
  - History of Howland Island
  - History of Jarvis Island
  - History of Johnston Atoll
  - History of Kingman Reef
  - History of Midway Atoll
  - History of Palmyra Atoll
  - History of Wake Island

=== History of Oceania by subject ===
- Economic history of Oceania
- History of the Jews in Oceania
- Military history of Oceania

== Culture of Oceania ==
Culture of Oceania

- Amusement parks in Oceania
- Architecture of Oceania
  - Mosques in Oceania
- Cuisine of Oceania
- Festivals in Oceania
  - Film festivals in Oceania
- Humor in Oceania
- Media in Oceania
- National symbols of Oceania
  - Coats of arms of Oceania
  - Flags of Oceania
  - National anthem of Oceania
- Nudity locations
- People of Oceania
  - Europeans in Oceania
  - Indigenous peoples of Oceania
  - Ethnic minorities in Oceania
    - Chinatowns in Oceania
    - Gurdwaras in Oceania
    - Jews in Oceania
  - Most common surnames in Oceania
- Prostitution in Oceania
- Public holidays in Oceania
- Records of Oceania

=== Art in Oceania ===
- Art in Oceania
- Cinema of Oceania
  - Oceania films
- Literature of Oceania
- Music of Oceania
- Television in Oceania
- Theatre in Oceania

=== Culture of Oceania by region ===
- Culture of American Samoa
- Culture of the Ashmore and Cartier Islands (Australia)
- Culture of Australia
- Culture of the Cook Islands(New Zealand)
- Culture of the Coral Sea Islands (Australia)
- Culture of Easter Island (Chile)
- Culture of Fiji
- Culture of French Polynesia (France)
- Culture of Guam (United States)
- Culture of Hawaii(United States)
- Culture of Indonesia
- Culture of Kiribati
- Culture of the Marshall Islands
- Culture of the Federated States of Micronesia
- Culture of Nauru
- Culture of New Caledonia (France)
- Culture of New Zealand
- Culture of Niue (New Zealand)
- Culture of Norfolk Island (Australia)
- Culture of the Northern Mariana Islands (United States)
- Culture of Palau
- Culture of Papua New Guinea
- Culture of the Pitcairn Islands (United Kingdom)
- Culture of Samoa
- Culture of the Solomon Islands
- Culture of Tokelau (New Zealand)
- Culture of Tonga
- Culture of Tuvalu
- Culture of Vanuatu
- Culture of Wallis and Futuna (France)
- United States Minor Outlying Islands:
  - Culture of Baker Island
  - Culture of Howland Island
  - Culture of Jarvis Island
  - Culture of Johnston Atoll
  - Culture of Kingman Reef
  - Culture of Midway Atoll
  - Culture of Palmyra Atoll
  - Culture of Wake Island

=== Languages of Oceania ===
Languages of Oceania

- By region
  - Austronesian languages
  - Central Pacific languages
  - Oceanic languages
  - Southern Oceanic languages
  - Remote Oceanic languages
  - By country or territory
    - Hawaiian language
      - Hawaiian Pidgin
- Fiafia
      - Languages of Norfolk Island
      - Languages of the Pitcairn Islands
- Endangered languages in Oceania
- Extinct languages of Oceania
- Specific languages
  - Maisin language
  - Norfuk language
  - Pitkern
  - Proto-Oceanic language
  - Torres Strait Creole

=== Religion in Oceania ===
Religion in Oceania

- Islam in Oceania
  - Mosques in Oceania

==== Religion in Oceania by political division ====
- Religion in American Samoa
- Religion in the Ashmore and Cartier Islands (Australia)
- Religion in Australia
- Religion in the Cook Islands(New Zealand)
- Religion in the Coral Sea Islands (Australia)
- Religion in Easter Island (Chile)
- Religion in Fiji
- Religion in French Polynesia (France)
- Religion in Guam (United States)
- Religion in Hawaii(United States)
- Religion in Indonesia
- Religion in Kiribati
- Religion in the Marshall Islands
- Religion in the Federated States of Micronesia
- Religion in Nauru
- Religion in New Caledonia (France)
- Religion in New Zealand
- Religion in Niue (New Zealand)
- Religion in Norfolk Island (Australia)
- Religion in the Northern Mariana Islands (United States)
- Religion in Palau
- Religion in Papua New Guinea
- Religion in the Pitcairn Islands (United Kingdom)
- Religion in Samoa
- Religion in the Solomon Islands
- Religion in Tokelau (New Zealand)
- Religion in Tonga
- Religion in Tuvalu
- Religion in Vanuatu
- Religion in Wallis and Futuna (France)
- United States Minor Outlying Islands:
  - Religion in Baker Island
  - Religion in Howland Island
  - Religion in Jarvis Island
  - Religion in Johnston Atoll
  - Religion in Kingman Reef
  - Religion in Midway Atoll
  - Religion in Palmyra Atoll
  - Religion in Wake Island

=== Sports in Oceania ===
Sport in Oceania

- Basketball in Oceania
  - FIBA Oceania
- Football in Oceania
  - Australian rules football in Oceania
  - Oceania Football Confederation
  - Oceania Footballer of the Year
- Rugby in Oceania
  - FORU Oceania Cup
- Skiing in Oceania
  - Ski areas and resorts in Oceania
- Swimming in Oceania
  - Oceania Swimming Association
  - Oceania Swimming Championships
    - List of Oceania Championships records in swimming

== Economy and infrastructure of Oceania ==
Economy of Oceania

- List of Oceanian countries by GDP
- Banking in Oceania
  - Banks in Oceania
- Communications in Oceania
  - Internet in Oceania
  - Television stations in Oceania
- Supermarket chains in Oceania
- Energy in Oceania
- Health care in Oceania
- Transport in Oceania
  - Air transportation in Oceania
    - Airports in Oceania
    - Airlines of Oceania
      - List of largest airlines in Oceania
  - Rail transport in Oceania
    - Town tramway systems in Oceania
  - Roads in Oceania
- Water supply and sanitation in Oceania

=== Economy by country and territory ===
- Economy of American Samoa
- Economy of the Ashmore and Cartier Islands (Australia)
- Economy of Australia
- Economy of the Cook Islands(New Zealand)
- Economy of the Coral Sea Islands (Australia)
- Economy of Easter Island (Chile)
- Economy of Fiji
- Economy of French Polynesia (France)
- Economy of Guam (United States)
- Economy of Hawaii(United States)
- Economy of Indonesia
- Economy of Kiribati
- Economy of the Marshall Islands
- Economy of the Federated States of Micronesia
- Economy of Nauru
- Economy of New Caledonia (France)
- Economy of New Zealand
- Economy of Niue (New Zealand)
- Economy of Norfolk Island (Australia)
- Economy of the Northern Mariana Islands (United States)
- Economy of Palau
- Economy of Papua New Guinea
- Economy of the Pitcairn Islands (United Kingdom)
- Economy of Samoa
- Economy of the Solomon Islands
- Economy of Tokelau (New Zealand)
- Economy of Tonga
- Economy of Tuvalu
- Economy of Vanuatu
- Economy of Wallis and Futuna (France)
- United States Minor Outlying Islands:
  - Economy of Baker Island
  - Economy of Howland Island
  - Economy of Jarvis Island
  - Economy of Johnston Atoll
  - Economy of Kingman Reef
  - Economy of Midway Atoll
  - Economy of Palmyra Atoll
  - Economy of Wake Island

== Education in Oceania ==
Education in Oceania

- Medical schools in Oceania

== See also ==
- List of basic geography topics
