= Kaloko =

Kaloko can refer to a location in Hawaii, United States:

- Kaloko, Hawaii, a census-designated place on the island of Hawaii
- Kaloko-Honokōhau National Historical Park, on the island of Hawaii
- Ka Loko Reservoir, on Kauai

== See also ==
- Kalokol, a town on Lake Turkana, Kenya
