= Dolohmwar =

Mountain in Pohnpei, Federal States of Micronesia

- Location within Federated States of Micronesia

Highest point
- Elevation: 760 m (2,490 ft)
- Coordinates: 6°51′25″N 158°13′57″E

Geography
- Location: Pohnpei, FSM

Geology
- Mountain type: Hill

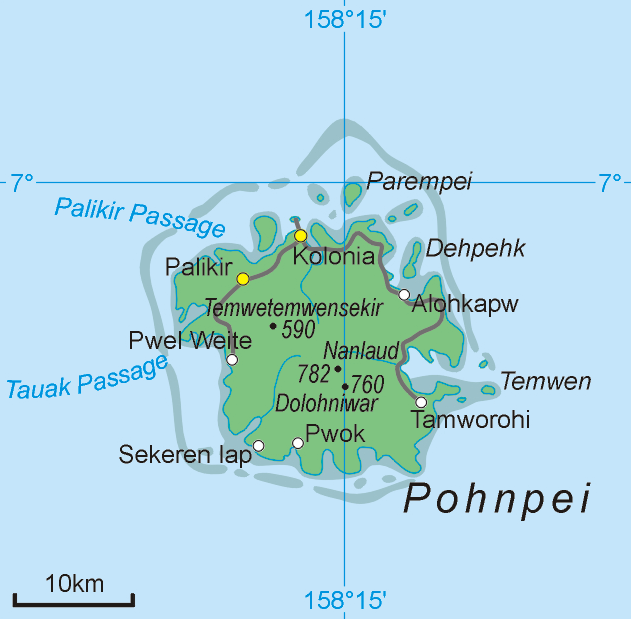
Map of Pohnpei Island showing Dolohmwar

Dolohmwar or Totolom is the third highest point of the Federated States of Micronesia, with an altitude of 760 metres (2,595 ft). Mount Nanlaud 1.9 km to the north-northwest is the highest point at 2,566 feet (782 m). Between the two is Ngihneni, within a meter or two of Nanlaud. All three are clearly depicted on the definitive USGS 1:25,000 scale topographic survey.

Dolohmwar is located on the island and in the state of Pohnpei.

== See also ==
- Geography of the Federated States of Micronesia
