= 2006 in Oceania =

== Incumbents ==
- American Samoa (U.S. territory)
  - Governor – Togiola Tulafono
- Australia
  - Monarch – Elizabeth II
  - Governor-General – Michael Jeffery
  - Prime Minister – John Howard
- Cook Islands (self-governing territory of New Zealand)
  - High Commissioner – John Bryan
  - Queen's Representative – Frederick Goodwin
  - Prime Minister – Jim Marurai
- East Timor
  - President - Xanana Gusmão
  - Prime Minister - Marí Alkatiri (until 26 June), José Ramos-Horta (8 July onward)
- Fiji
  - President - Ratu Josefa Iloilo
  - Prime Minister – Laisenia Qarase, Prime Minister of Fiji (until 5 December), Jona Senilagakali (5 December onward)
- French Polynesia (overseas collectivity of France)
  - High Commissioner - Anne Boquet (acting)
  - President of the Government - Oscar Temaru (until 26 December), Gaston Tong Sang (26 December onward)
- Guam
  - Governor - Felix Perez Camacho
- Hawaii
  - Governor - Linda Lingle (R)
  - Senators - Daniel Inouye (D) and Daniel Akaka (D)
  - Representatives - Neil Abercrombie (D) and Ed Case (D)
- Kiribati
  - President - Anote Tong
- Marshall Islands
  - President - Kessai Note
- Federated States of Micronesia
  - President - Joseph Urusemal
- Nauru
  - President - Ludwig Scotty
- New Caledonia (special collectivity of France)
  - High Commissioner - Michel Mathieu
  - President of the Government - Marie-Noëlle Thémereau
- New Zealand
  - Monarch – Elizabeth II
  - Governor-General - Dame Silvia Cartwright (until 4 August), Anand Satyanand (4 August onward)
  - Prime Minister – Helen Clark
- Niue (associated state of New Zealand)
  - Resident Commissioner - Sandra Lee-Vercoe
  - Prime Minister – Young Vivian
- Norfolk Island
  - Administrator - Grant Tambling
  - Chief Minister - Geoff Gardner (until 2 June), David Buffett (2 June onward)
- Northern Mariana Islands (Commonwealth of the U.S.)
  - Governor - Juan Babauta (until 9 January), Benigno Fitial (9 January onward)
- Palau
  - President - Thomas Remengesau Jr.
- Papua New Guinea
  - Monarch – Elizabeth II
  - Governor-General - Sir Paulias Matane
  - Prime Minister – Sir Michael Somare
- Bougainville (autonomous region of Papua New Guinea)
  - President - Joseph Kabui
- Pitcairn Islands (overseas territory of the United Kingdom)
  - Governor - Richard Fell (until 2 May), George Fergusson (2 May onward)
  - Commissioner - Leslie Jacques
  - Mayor - Jay Warren
- Samoa
  - O le Ao o le Malo – Malietoa Tanumafili II
  - Prime Minister – Tuilaʻepa Saʻilele Malielegaoi
- Solomon Islands
  - Monarch – Elizabeth II
  - Governor-General - Sir Nathaniel Waena
  - Prime Minister – Sir Allan Kemakeza (until 20 April), Snyder Rini (20 April – 4 May), Manasseh Sogavare (4 May onward)
- Tokelau (territory of New Zealand)
  - Administrator - Neil Walter (until 17 October), David Payton (17 October onward)
  - Head of Government - Pio Tuia (until 15 February), Kolouei O'Brien (15 February onward)
- Tonga
  - Monarch – Tāufaʻāhau Tupou IV (until 10 September), George Tupou V (10 September onward)
  - Prime Minister – Prince ʻUlukālala Lavaka Ata (until 11 February), Feleti Sevele (13 February onward)
- Tuvalu
  - Monarch – Elizabeth II
  - Governor-General - Filoimea Telito
  - Prime Minister – Maatia Toafa (until 14 August), Apisai Ielemia (14 August onward)
- Vanuatu
  - President - Kalkot Mataskelekele
  - Prime Minister – Ham Lini
- Wallis and Futuna (overseas collectivity of France)
  - Administrator-Superior - Xavier de Furst
  - President of the Territorial Assembly - Apeleto Likuvalu

== Events ==
=== February ===
- February 13: Tongan Prime Minister Prince ʻUlukālala Lavaka Ata resigns suddenly on 11 February 2006, and also gives up his other cabinet portfolios. He was replaced in the interim by the elected Minister of Labour, Dr. Feleti Sevele.
- February 16: Tokelau will remain a New Zealand territory after a referendum on independence. A 60 percent majority voted in favor of independence, but a two-thirds majority was required for the referendum to succeed.
- February 20: Retired scientist Don Kennedy suggests the entire population of Tuvalu should move to the Fijian island of Kioa, to preserve Tuvaluan culture as their homeland becomes uninhabitable due to rising sea levels.
- February 20: The Papua New Guinea Electoral Boundaries Commission presents its report suggesting 26 new Open electorates be created for the scheduled 2007 election.
- February 20: Officials in Guam warn people not to eat fish caught in Merizo's Cocos Lagoon due to major polychlorinated biphenyl (PCB) contamination from a former United States Coast Guard station on Cocos Island.
- February 24: Benigno R. Fitial announces the Northern Mariana Islands will host the 2006 Micronesian Games from June 23, 2006 to July 7, 2006.
- February 27: Vanuatu's Commodities Marketing Board takes over the export of kava, Vanuatu's third largest export earner. The Fisheries and Quarantine department, who were previously responsible for kava, protested the move due to their view that the VCMB did not have the expertise needed.
- February 27: More than a quarter of the soldiers in East Timor's Army quit in protest over conditions and promotion rules.

=== March ===
- March 1: Fijian Prime Minister Laisenia Qarase announces that the 2006 Fiji general elections will be held in the second week of May from the 6th to the 13th.
- March 2: The Pitcairn Court of Appeal dismissed the appeal against the 2004 sexual assault trial. Randall Christian's appeal against indecent assault of a girl aged under 13 was upheld, but this doesn't affect his sentence of six years on other charges. The men will now appeal to the Privy Council in London.
- March 2: The United Nations working group on mercenaries asks Fiji and Papua New Guinea for permission to send a team to investigate the presence of former Fijian soldiers in Bougainville.
- March 3: Papua New Guinea Transport and Civil Aviation Minister Don Polye announces an open air policy, which would allow other airlines to compete with Air Niugini on international routes into and from Papua New Guinea. The policy took effect from 2007.
- March 4: A fire damages the central Papeete power station, resulting in limited power for some areas of Tahiti for a couple of weeks.
- March 8: Fijian President Ratu Josefa Iloilo and Vice-President Ratu Joni Madraiwiwi are re-elected to another five-year term.
- March 10: The Pasifika Festival opens in Auckland New Zealand. The annual festival is the largest Pacific Islands community event. It lasts for a month, and covers cultural, sporting and business events.
- March 14: The Ka Loko Reservoir dam in Kauai, Hawaii bursts, killing one man and leaving six others missing.
- March 21: Solomon Islands Labour Party leader Joses Tuhanuku alleges Prime Minister Allan Kemakeza is directly implicated in corrupt aid payments by Taiwan to local politicians.
- March 26: RFO television news in New Caledonia was cancelled for two days due to a strike in protest at the sacking of a technician.
- March 26: East Timor's Prime Minister, Mari Alkatiri, calls for calm after former soldiers looted shops and threw stones at opponents in Dili. 591 soldiers were dismissed from the army in the previous week after deserting their posts.
- March 29: A sewer pipe leak at Waikiki in Hawaii is repaired, but several popular beaches were left polluted.
- March 30: Hiro Tefaarere, the French Polynesian minister for small and medium enterprises, resigns due to disagreements with the ruling coalition, and his failure to gain support for two development projects.
- March 30: Feleti Sevele is confirmed as the new Prime Minister of Tonga.

=== April ===
- April 2: The Human Rights Protection Party wins Samoa's general election. The HRPP was already the ruling party, and its leader Tuila'epa Sailele Malielegaoi the Prime Minister, but the party did better in the election than polls had indicated.
- April 3: Solomon Islands Police Commissioner Shane Castles confirms Prime Minister Allan Kemakeza is under investigation for fraud.
- April 5: Air Kiribati has given redundancy notices to its staff due to a lack of revenue, with half of their staff laid off through the process.
- April 5: Voting in the 2006 Solomon Islands general election takes place, with observers reporting a free and fair election.
- April 6: French police apologise for tear gassing women and children during clashes with Kanak activists in New Caledonia over environmental protections.
- April 6: Papua New Guinea imposes an agricultural quarantine over the province of East New Britain to contain the spread of the cocoa pod borer linked to logging companies.
- April 18: The announcement of the new Prime Minister of the Solomon Islands, Snyder Rini, is met by riots in Honiara. Australia and New Zealand promise to send more troops to keep order.
- April 20: 15,000 people march in Nouméa, New Caledonia to protest the high cost of living. The march is part of a 24-hour strike called by several trade unions.
- April 25: Japan agrees to pay US$6.1 Billion towards the cost of moving 8,000 US Marines from Okinawa to Guam.

== Sport ==
- 2006 Micronesian Games

== Deaths ==
- February 9: ʻAhomeʻe, Tongan noble, 35, heart failure
- February 24: Tūtoatasi Fakafānua, Tongan noble, 44
- July 5: ʻUluvalu, Tongan noble, 55, car accident
- September 10: Tāufaʻāhau Tupou IV, Tongan king, 88, old age
