= List of Hawaii tornadoes =

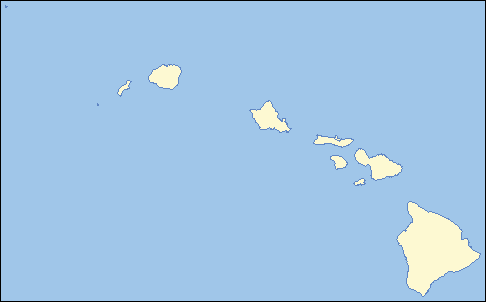
Map of Hawaii

The islands of Hawaii, situated in the Pacific Ocean, rarely experience tornadoes, averaging about one per year. The state ranks as the 48th most active in terms of touch downs, with 40 confirmed tornadoes since 1950. Only one tornado claimed a life in 1858 but none exceeded F2 intensity. This list of tornadoes in the state is likely incomplete, as official records date back only to 1950 for tornadoes in the United States, and Hawaii did not become a state until August 1959.

The most costly tornado occurred on January 28, 1971. Although the intensity of it is unknown, damages from the tornado were estimated at $2.5 million. The largest outbreak of tornadoes took place during a two-day span, starting on January 27, 1971 and ending the following day. During this event, three tornadoes were confirmed and two others were reported.

== Pre-1950 ==
- February 20, 1858: A tornado struck Lahaina destroying two houses and destroying a church. A building was also destroyed. The tornado then traveled through a mountain destroying another house while a banana tree was uprooted. A child was killed and the father was injured badly. In total, 40 homes were destroyed. The tornado caused at least $2,500 in damage.

== 1950–1974 ==
- March 19, 1955: Two tornadoes of unknown intensity touched down in Hawaii County. The first tornado tracked for roughly 1 mile (1.6 km) while the second was briefly on the ground.
- January 21, 1957: A tornado of unknown intensity touched down in Honolulu County; it tracked for 3 miles (4.8 km) and caused an estimated $25,000 in damages.
- February 28, 1963: a brief tornado with a width of 100 yards (91 m) touched down in Honolulu County, causing an estimated $25,000 in damages.
- March 27, 1963: A brief tornado of unknown intensity touched down in Honolulu County, injuring one person and causing an estimated $25,000 in damages.
- September 22, 1965: A brief tornado of unknown intensity touched down in Honolulu County.
- April 22, 1967: A brief tornado of unknown intensity touched down in Maui, causing $2,500 in damages.
- December 17, 1967: A tornado of unknown intensity touched down in Kauaʻi; tracking for 3 miles (4.8 km), the tornado caused an estimated $250,000 in damages.
- January 27, 1971: The United States Weather Bureau reported that a tornado likely touched down on Oahu for roughly .5 miles (0.80 km), causing $100,000 in damages. The tornado destroyed three barns and damaged 18 homes along its path, some of which were moved off their foundations.
- January 28, 1971: A tornado of unknown intensity touched down in Honolulu County and tracked for 2 miles (3.2 km), causing $250,000 in damages. A second, stronger tornado, forming as a large waterspout, moved onshore into Hawaii County, causing $2.5 million in damages and injured four people. The tornado struck the resort town of Kailua-Kona, overturning cars, some of which were blown into ditches, uprooting trees and severely damaging buildings. Winds in the tornado were estimated to have exceeded 100 miles per hour (160 km/h), making it either a high-end F1 or low-end F2 tornado. In all, the tornado destroyed 21 buildings, including a six-story steel hotel. Several buildings had their roofs torn off by the storm. On Maui, severe storms also caused flooding that forced the evacuation of numerous residents. Two other tornadoes were also reported during the day; however, it is unknown if they were confirmed.
- June 15, 1971: A tornado of unknown intensity touched down in Honolulu County; it tracked for 1 mile (1.6 km) and caused $25,000 in damages.
- December 18, 1971: A tornado of unknown intensity touched down in Kauaʻi and tracked for 3 miles (4.8 km) without causing damage.
- December 31, 1971: A brief tornado of unknown intensity touched down in Kauaʻi, causing no damage.
- May 27, 1973: A brief F0 tornado touched down in Hawaii County without causing damage.

== 1975–1999 ==
- November 26, 1975: An F0 tornado touched down somewhere in the state and tracked for 2 miles (3.2 km) without causing damage.
- November 20, 1978: A brief tornado of unknown intensity touched down in Hawaii County, causing $300 in damages.
- March 20, 1980: A brief F1 tornado touched down in Hawaii County, causing $300 in damages.
- February 11, 1982: Two F2 tornadoes touched down in Honolulu County, each causing $250,000 in damages.
- March 18, 1982: An F2 tornado touched down in Honolulu, causing $250,000 in damages.
- November 24, 1982: Hurricane Iwa, one of the worst storms to impact the state of Hawaii, reportedly produced a few tornadoes on Oahu.
- September 23, 1983: A brief F0 tornado touched down in Honolulu County, causing $2,500 in damages.
- September 26, 1985: A brief F0 tornado touched down in Honolulu County.
- April 3, 1986: A brief F0 tornado touched down in Hawaii County, causing $2,500 in damages.
- May 13, 1986: A brief F0 tornado touched down in Honolulu County.
- March 25, 1988: A brief F1 tornado touched down in Hawaii County.
- March 26, 1988: A brief F1 tornado touched down in Hawaii County.
- February 11, 1989: A brief F0 tornado touched down in Honolulu County, causing $2,500 in damages.
- September 5, 1992: An F1 tornado spawned on Oahu as a result of Hurricane Iniki on the same day.

== 2000–present ==
- March 24, 2002: A brief F0 tornado touched down in Anahola, Kauaʻi. The tornado first formed in the Anahola Valley and skipped along a 1 mile (1.6 km) path, ending in Moloaa Valley. Along the track, several sheds were destroyed, numerous trees were snapped and six homes sustained roof and wall damage. Damages from the tornado amounted to $60,000.
- June 7, 2003: A brief F0 tornado touched down roughly 3 miles (4.8 km) northeast of Mililani, Honolulu. A meteorologist from the National Weather Service spotted the tornado and reported that it was tracking towards Pearl City; however, the tornado dissipated before causing any damage.
- January 25, 2004: A brief F0 tornado touched down roughly 3 miles (4.8 km) northwest of Waipahu, Honolulu; no damage was reported in relation to the tornado.
- February 7, 2004: A brief F0 tornado touched down roughly 3 miles (4.8 km) east of Aiea, Honolulu; no damage was reported in relation to the tornado.
- February 27, 2004: An F0 tornado tracked for 5 miles (8.0 km), starting roughly 2 miles (3.2 km) southeast of Pahala, Hawaii. No structural damage occurred along the path; however, numerous trees were downed and several power poles were snapped.
- January 8, 2005: An F0 tornado touched down in Waimea, Kauaʻi and tracked east for 5 miles (8.0 km). Along the tornado's path, a carport was damaged and numerous trees were downed.
- December 4, 2005: A brief F0 tornado touched down in Aiea, Honolulu, downing several trees and damaging the roof of a home. One tree also fell on a truck.
- March 23, 2006: A brief F0 tornado touched down in Kaumalapau Harbor, Lana'i. The tornado flipped over a construction trailer and carried it for about ten feet, damaged an adjacent small building, and snapped a power pole.
- March 25, 2006: A brief F0 tornado touched down roughly 2 miles (3.2 km) west of Haiku, Maui. No damage was reported in relation to it.
- September 23, 2008: A brief EF0 tornado touched down about 1 mile (1.6 km) northeast of Lanai Airport on Lanai. No damage was reported in relation to it.
- December 13, 2008: A brief EF0 tornado touched down in Pakala Village, Kauaʻi, causing only minor crop damage.
- February 11, 2009: Two tornadoes touched down on Oahu in Hawaii. At 12:50 pm local time, the first tornado touched down near a quarry, damaging nearby buildings. The tornado moved through a golf course next, throwing a utility cart about 50 to 60 ft. The tornado lifted at 1:10 pm, 20 minutes after it touched down. Numerous trees were damaged throughout the tornado's mile long path. Following an assessment by the National Weather Service, the tornado was rated as an EF1. During the assessment of the tornado, another weaker tornado was discovered to the northeast. The tornado touched down in a construction site and damaged dust barriers. The second tornado was on the ground for about ten minutes and traveled less than half a mile. The National Weather Service rated the tornado as a low-end EF0.
- May 2, 2011: During a massive thunderstorm, twin waterspouts appeared off the southeast coast of O'ahu at 5:50pm, moving slowly westward and dissipating after about 12 minutes.
- March 9, 2012: A tornadic waterspout associated with a supercell thunderstorm moved ashore on Lanikai Beach, Oahu at 7:10 AM. The tornado, rated an EF0, tracked inland for 1.5 miles, reaching the Enchanted Lakes subdivision of Kailua.
- April 23, 2015 – An EF0 tornado touched down near ʻEwa Beach and dissipated without causing damage.

== See also ==
- List of tornadoes and tornado outbreaks
- Climate of Hawaii
- List of Hawaii hurricanes
- 2012 Hawaii hailstorm
