= Climate of Hawaii =

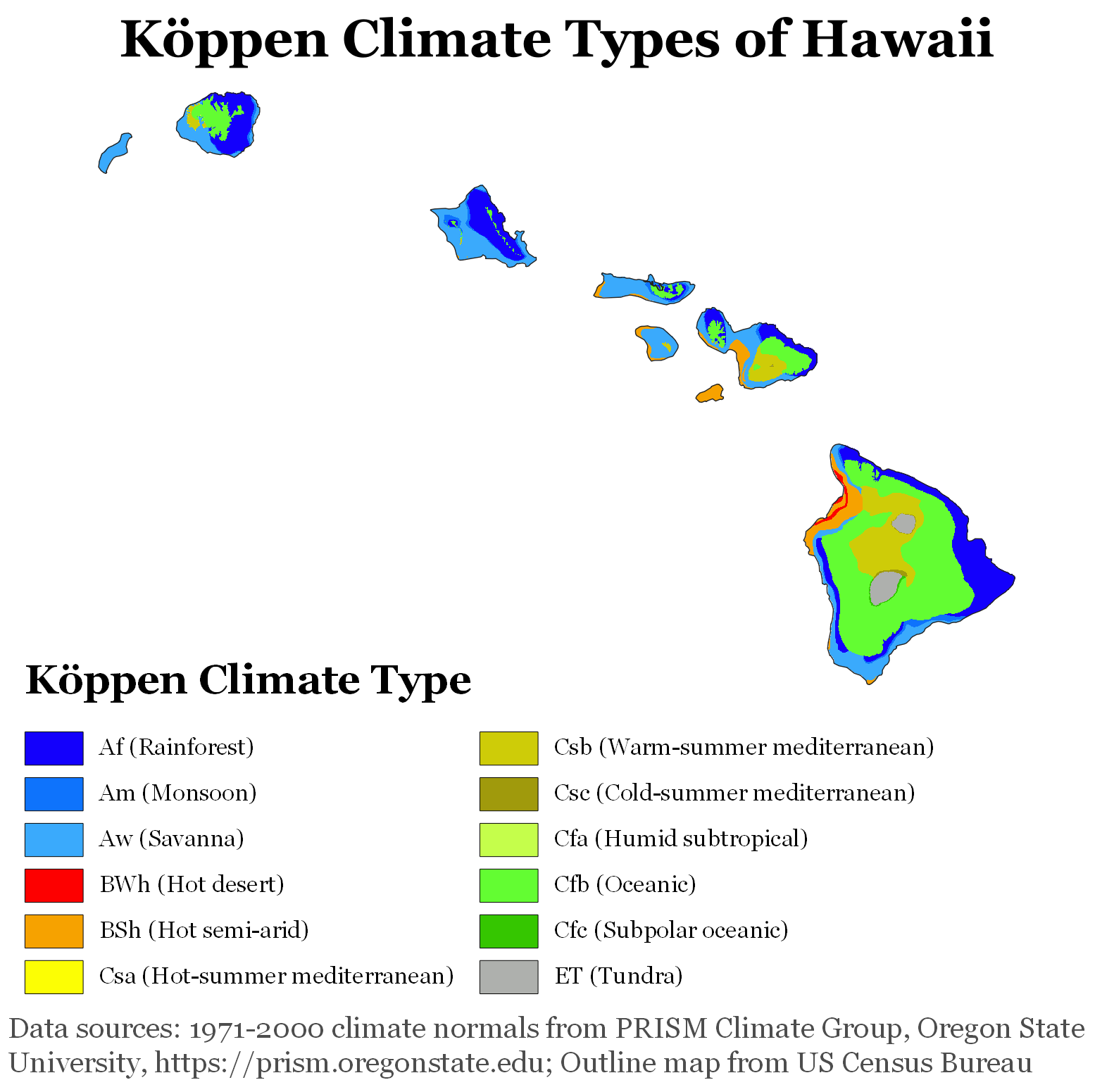
Köppen climate types of Hawaii, using 1971-2000 climate normals.

The U.S. state of Hawaii, which covers the Hawaiian Islands, is tropical but it experiences many different climates, depending on altitude and surroundings. The island of Hawaiʻi for example hosts four (out of five in total) climate groups on a surface as small as 4,028 square miles (10,430 km^{2}) according to the Köppen climate types: tropical, arid, temperate and polar. When counting also the Köppen sub-categories – notably including the very rare cold-summer mediterranean climate – the island of Hawaiʻi hosts 10 (out of 14 in total) climate zones. The islands receive most rainfall from the trade winds on their north and east flanks (the windward side) as a result of orographic precipitation. Coastal areas are drier, especially the south and west sides or leeward sides.

Overall with climate change, Hawaiʻi is getting drier and hotter. The Hawaiian Islands receive their heaviest rainfall from October to April. Drier conditions generally prevail from May to September. Due to cooler waters around Hawaiʻi, the risk of tropical cyclones is low for the state.

== Temperature ==
Temperatures at sea level generally range from highs of 84–88 °F (29–31 °C) during the summer months to 79–83 °F (26–28 °C) during the winter months. Rarely does the temperature rise from above 90 °F (32 °C) or drop below 60 °F (16 °C) at lower elevations. Temperatures are lower at higher altitudes. During the winter, snowfall is common at the summits of Mauna Kea and Mauna Loa on Hawaiʻi Island. On Maui, the summit of Haleakalā occasionally experiences snowfall, but snow had never been observed below 7,500 feet (2,300 m) before February 2019, when snow was observed at 6,200 feet (1,900 m) and fell at higher elevations in amounts large enough to force Haleakalā National Park to close for several days. The record low temperature in Honolulu is 52 °F (11 °C) on January 20, 1969.

Overall Hawaiʻi is getting hotter, with global warming being a possible cause. Temperatures of 90 °F (32 °C) and above are uncommon, with the exception of dry, leeward areas. In the leeward areas, temperatures may reach into the low 90s °F or 32-34 °C several days during the year, but temperatures higher than these are unusual. The highest temperature ever recorded on the islands was 100 °F (38 °C) on April 27, 1931, in Pāhala. The surface waters of the open ocean around Hawaiʻi range from 75 °F (24 °C) between late February and early April, to a maximum of 82 °F (28 °C) in late September or early October. In the United States, only Florida has warmer surf temperatures.

The Pacific High, and with it the trade wind zone, moves north and south with changing angle of the sun, so that it reaches its northernmost position in the summer. This brings trade winds during the period of May through September, when they are prevalent 80 to 95 percent of the time. From October through April, the heart of the trade winds moves south of Hawaiʻi; thus there average wind speeds are lower across the islands. Due to Hawaiʻi being at the northern edge of the tropics (mostly above 20 latitude), there are only weak wet and dry seasons unlike many tropical climates.

== Winds ==
Island wind patterns are very complex. Though the trade winds are fairly constant, their relatively uniform air flow is distorted and disrupted by mountains, hills, and valleys. Usually winds blow upslope by day and downslope by night. Local conditions that produce occasional violent winds are not well understood. These are very localized, sometimes reaching speeds of 60 to 100 mph (100 to 160 km/h) and are best known in the settled areas of Kula and Lāhainā on Maui. The Kula winds are strong downslope winds on the lower slopes of the west side of Haleakalā. These winds tend to be strongest from 2,000 to 4,000 ft (600 to 1,200 m) above mean sea level.

The Lahaina winds are also downslope winds, but are somewhat different. They are also called "lehua winds" after the ʻōhiʻa lehua (Metrosideros polymorpha), whose red blossoms fill the air when these strong winds blow. They issue from canyons at the base of the western Maui mountains, where steeper canyon slopes meet the more gentle piedmont slope below. These winds only occur every 8 to 12 years. They are extremely violent, with wind speeds of 80–100 mph (130–160 km/h) or more.

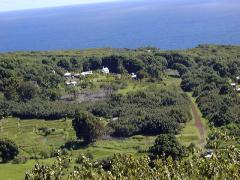
Road to Hāna

== Cloud formation ==
Under trade wind conditions, there is very often a pronounced moisture discontinuity between 4,000 and 8,000 feet (1,200 and 2,400 m). Below these heights, the air is moist; above, it is dry. The break (a large-scale feature of the Pacific High) is caused by a temperature inversion embedded in the moving trade wind air. The inversion tends to suppress the vertical movement of air and so restricts cloud development to the zone just below the inversion. The inversion is present 50 to 70 percent of the time; its height fluctuates from day to day, but it is usually between 5,000 and 7,000 feet (1,500 and 2,100 m). On trade wind days when the inversion is well defined, the clouds develop below these heights with only an occasional cloud top breaking through the inversion.

These towering clouds form along the mountains where the incoming trade wind air converges as it moves up a valley and is forced up and over the mountains to heights of several thousand feet. On days without an inversion, the sky is almost cloudless (completely cloudless skies are extremely rare). In leeward areas well screened from the trade winds (such as the west coast of Maui), skies are clear 30 to 60 percent of the time.

Windward areas tend to be cloudier during the summer, when the trade winds and associated clouds are more prevalent, while leeward areas, which are less affected by cloudy conditions associated with trade wind cloudiness, tend to be cloudier during the winter, when storm fronts pass through more frequently. On Maui, the cloudiest zones are at and just below the summits of the mountains, and at elevations of 2,000 to 4,000 ft (600 to 1,200 m) on the windward sides of Haleakalā. In these locations the sky is cloudy more than 70 percent of the time. The usual clarity of the air in the high mountains is associated with the low moisture content of the air.

== Precipitation ==
Hawaiʻi differs from many tropical locations with pronounced wet and dry seasons, in that the wet season coincides with the winter months (rather than the summer months more typical of other places in the tropics). For instance, Honolulu's Köppen climate classification is the rare As wet-winter subcategory of the tropical wet and dry climate type.

Overall with climate change, Hawaiʻi is getting drier. Major storms occur most frequently in October through March. There may be as many as six or seven major storm events in a year. Such storms bring heavy rains and can be accompanied by strong local winds. The storms may be associated with the passage of a cold front, the leading edge of a mass of relatively cool air that is moving from west to east or from northwest to southeast.

Annual mean rainfall ranges from 7.4 in (188 mm) on the summit of Mauna Kea to 404.4 in (10,271 mm) in Big Bog. Windward slopes have greater rainfall than leeward lowlands and tall mountains.

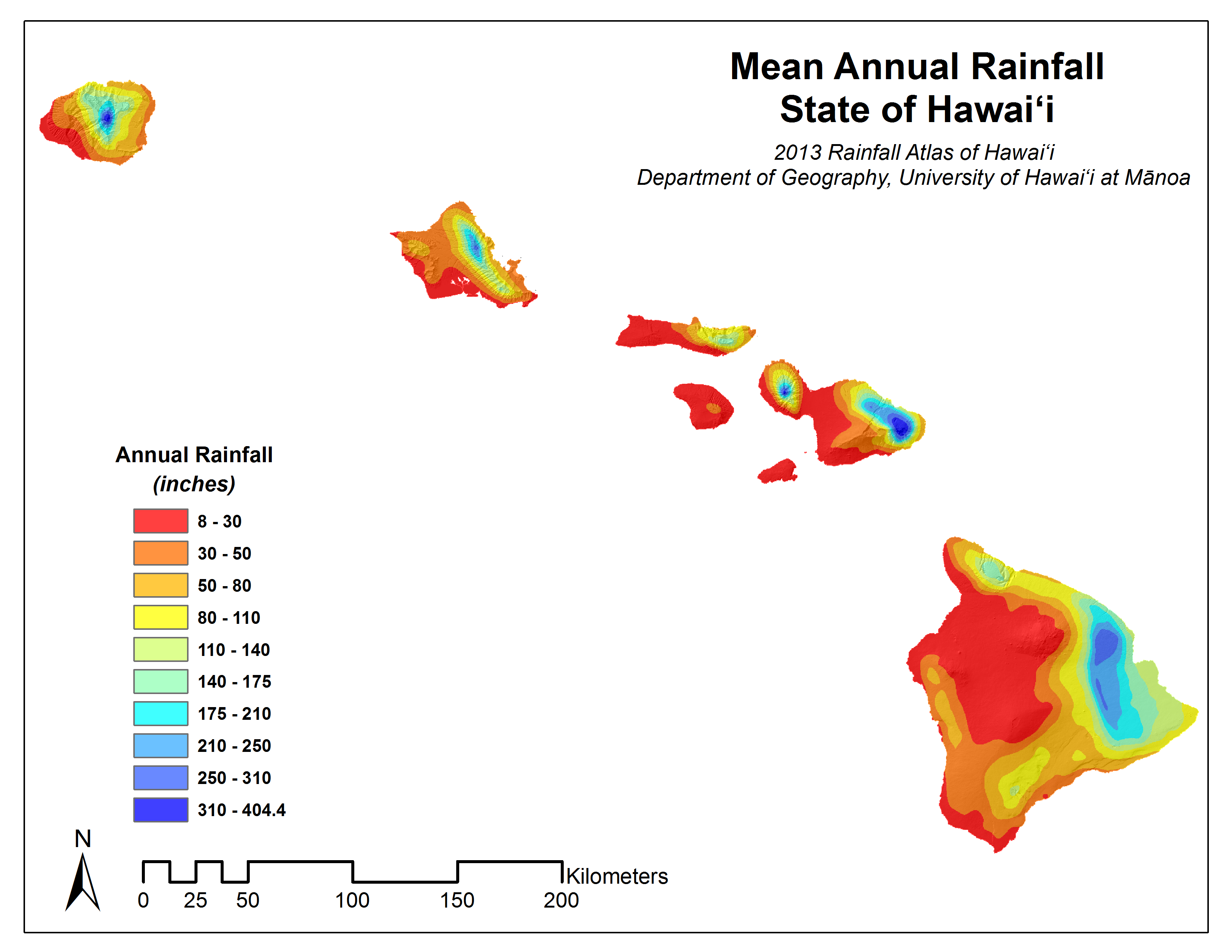
Average Annual Rainfall for the State of Hawaiʻi, http://rainfall.geography.hawaii.edu/

On windward coasts, many brief showers are common, not one of which is heavy enough to produce more than 0.01 in (0.25 mm) of rain. The usual run of trade wind weather yields many light showers in the lowlands, whereas torrential rains are associated with a sudden surge in the trade winds or with a major storm. Hāna has had as much as 28 in (710 mm) of rain in a single 24-hour period.

Severe thunderstorms, as defined by the National Weather Service (NWS) as tornadoes, hail 1 in (25 mm) or larger, and/or convective winds of at least 58 mph (93 km/h) occur but are relatively uncommon. Nontornadic waterspouts are more common than tornadoes produced by supercells, which produce stronger, longer lasting tornadoes, especially with respect to inland areas, and also produce the largest hail, such as the 2012 Hawaiʻi hailstorm. An annual average of approximately one tornado, either emanating from supercells or by other processes, occurs.

Kona storms are features of the winter season. The name comes from winds out of the "kona" or usually leeward direction. Rainfall in a well-developed Kona storm is widespread and more prolonged than in the usual cold-front storm. Kona storm rains are usually most intense in an arc, extending from south to east of the storm and well in advance of its center. Kona rains last from several hours to several days. The rains may continue steadily, but the longer lasting ones are characteristically interrupted by intervals of lighter rain or partial clearing, as well as by intense showers superimposed on the more moderate continuous, steady rain. An entire winter may pass without a single well-developed Kona storm. More often there are one or two such storms a year; sometimes four or five.

== Hurricanes ==
The hurricane season in the Hawaiian Islands is roughly from June through November, when hurricanes and tropical storms are most probable in the North Pacific. These storms tend to originate off the coast of Mexico (particularly the Baja California peninsula) and track west or northwest towards the islands. As storms cross the Pacific, they tend to lose strength if they bear northward and encounter cooler water.

True hurricanes are rare in Hawaiʻi, thanks in part to the comparatively cool waters around the islands as well as unfavorable atmospheric conditions, such as enhanced wind shear; only four have affected the islands during 63 years. Tropical storms are more frequent. These have more modest winds, below 74 mph (119 km/h). Because tropical storms resemble Kona storms, and because early records do not distinguish clearly between them, it has been difficult to estimate the average frequency of tropical storms. Every year or two a tropical storm will affect the weather in some part of the islands. Unlike cold fronts and Kona storms, hurricanes and tropical storms are most likely to occur during the last half of the year, from July through December. Three strong and destructive hurricanes are known to have made landfall on the islands, an unnamed storm in 1871, Hurricane Dot in 1959, and Hurricane ʻIniki in 1992. Another hurricane, ʻIwa, caused significant damage in 1982 but its center passed nearby and did not directly make landfall. The rarity of hurricanes making landfall on the Islands is subject to change as the climate warms. In the Pliocene era, where CO_{2} levels were comparable to those we see today, the waters around Hawaiʻi were much warmer, resulting in frequent hurricane strikes in computer simulations.

== Effect on trade winds ==
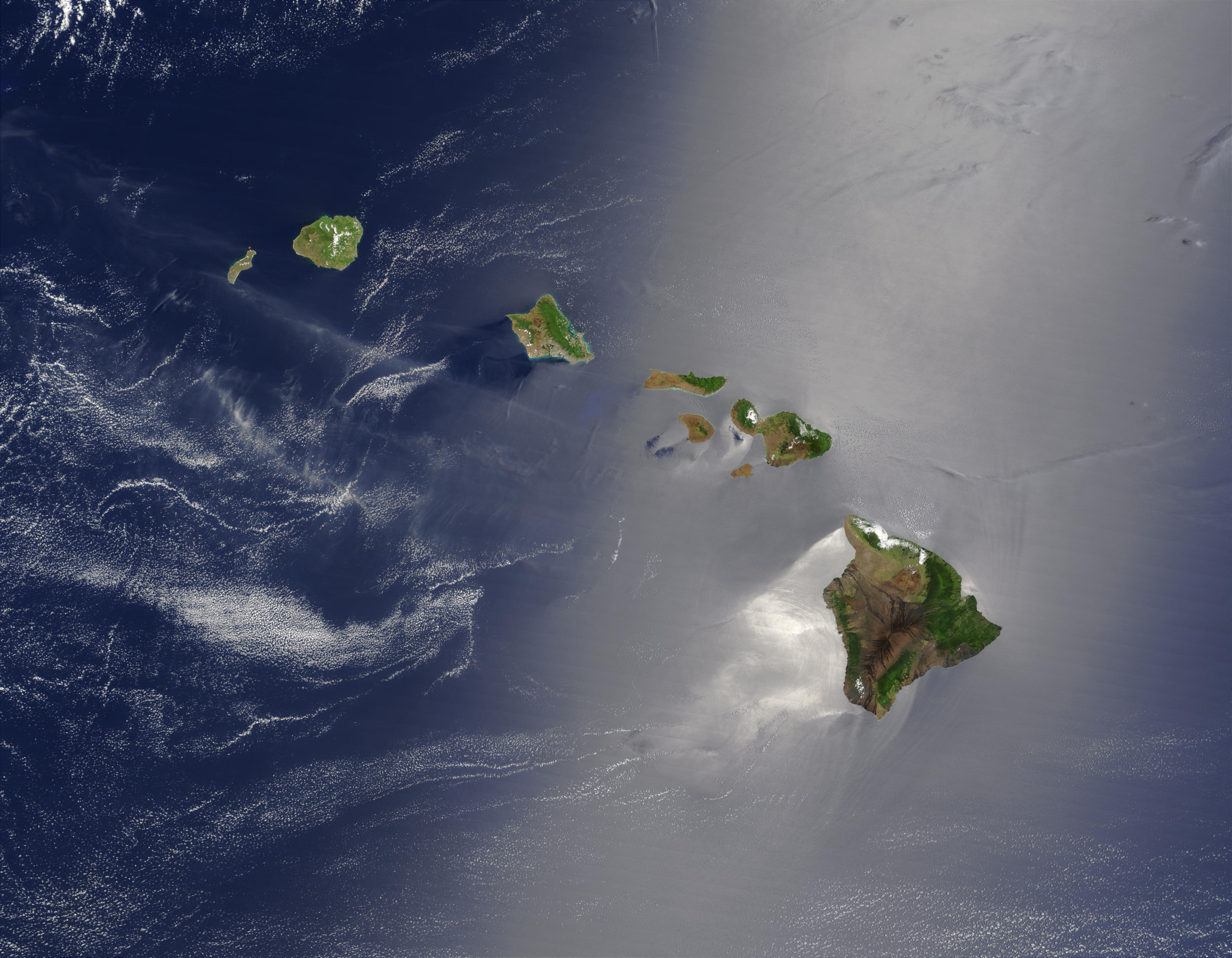
A true-color satellite view of Hawaiʻi shows that most of the flora on the islands grow on the north-east sides, which face the trade winds. The texture change around the calmer south-west of the islands is the result of the shelter provided from the islands.

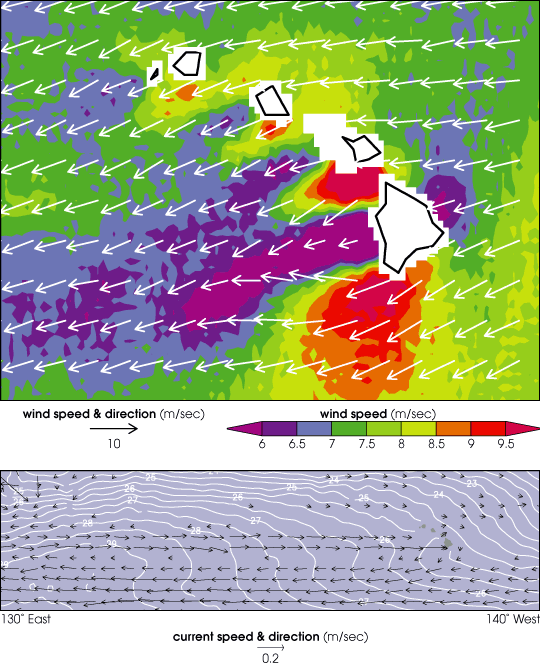
The top image above shows the winds around the Hawaiian Islands measured by the Seawinds instrument aboard QuikSCAT during August 1999. Trade winds blow from right to left in the image. The bottom image shows the ocean current formed by the islands' wake. Arrows indicate current direction and speed, while white contours show ocean temperatures. The warm water of the current generates winds that sustain the current for thousands of miles.

Despite being small islands within the vast Pacific Ocean, the Hawaiian Islands have a surprising effect on ocean currents and circulation patterns over much of the Pacific. In the Northern Hemisphere, trade winds blow from northeast to southwest, from North and South America toward Asia, between the equator and 30 degrees north latitude. Typically, the trade winds continue across the Pacific, unless something gets in their way, like an island.

Hawaiʻi's high mountains present a substantial obstacle to the trade winds. The elevated topography blocks the airflow, effectively splitting the trade winds in two. This split causes a zone of weak winds, called a "wind wake", on the leeward side of the islands.

Aerodynamic theory indicates that an island wind wake effect should dissipate within a few hundred kilometers and not be felt in the western Pacific. However, the wind wake caused by the Hawaiian Islands extends 1,860 miles (3,000 km), roughly 10 times longer than any other wake. The long wake testifies to the strong interaction between the atmosphere and ocean, which has strong implications for global climate research. It is also important for understanding natural climate variations, like El Niño.

There are number of reasons why this has been observed only in Hawaiʻi. First, the ocean reacts slowly to fast-changing winds; winds must be steady to exert force on the ocean, such as the trade winds. Second, the high mountain topography provides a significant disturbance to the winds. Third, the Hawaiian Islands are large in horizontal (east-west) scale, extending over four degrees in longitude. It is this active interaction between wind, ocean current, and temperature that creates this uniquely long wake west of Hawaiʻi.

The wind wake drives an eastward "counter current" that brings warm water 5,000 miles (8,000 km) from the Asian coast. This warm water drives further changes in wind, allowing the island effect to extend far into the western Pacific. The counter current had been observed by oceanographers near the Hawaiian Islands years before the long wake was discovered, but they did not know what caused it.

== Statistics ==
=== State ===
Climate data for Hawaiʻi
Month	Jan	Feb	Mar	Apr	May	Jun	Jul	Aug	Sep	Oct	Nov	Dec	Year
Record high °F (°C)	93 (34)	94 (34)	95 (35)	96 (36)	98 (37)	97 (36)	98 (37)	100 (38)	98 (37)	97 (36)	96 (36)	97 (36)	100 (38)
Mean daily maximum °F (°C)	81 (27)	81 (27)	82 (28)	84 (29)	86 (30)	88 (31)	88 (31)	90 (32)	90 (32)	88 (31)	84 (29)	82 (28)	85 (30)
Mean daily minimum °F (°C)	64 (18)	66 (19)	68 (20)	70 (21)	70 (21)	72 (22)	73 (23)	75 (24)	73 (23)	73 (23)	72 (22)	66 (19)	70 (21)
Record low °F (°C)	14 (−10)	12 (−11)	18 (−8)	18 (−8)	12 (−11)	23 (−5)	22 (−6)	17 (−8)	23 (−5)	20 (−7)	20 (−7)	17 (−8)	12 (−11)
Average precipitation inches (mm)	3.07 (78)	3.54 (90)	3.46 (88)	2.05 (52)	1.50 (38)	1.69 (43)	2.24 (57)	1.34 (34)	2.40 (61)	3.15 (80)	4.88 (124)	3.43 (87)	32.75 (832)
Average precipitation days	18	16	19	19	18	20	22	19	17	18	20	19	225
Source: Holiday Weather

=== Major cities ===
Climate data for Hilo International Airport, Hawaiʻi (1981–2010 normals, extremes 1949–present)
Month	Jan	Feb	Mar	Apr	May	Jun	Jul	Aug	Sep	Oct	Nov	Dec	Year
Record high °F (°C)	92 (33)	92 (33)	93 (34)	89 (32)	94 (34)	90 (32)	91 (33)	93 (34)	93 (34)	91 (33)	94 (34)	93 (34)	94 (34)
Mean maximum °F (°C)	84.9 (29.4)	84.8 (29.3)	84.4 (29.1)	83.3 (28.5)	84.6 (29.2)	85.6 (29.8)	86.3 (30.2)	86.9 (30.5)	86.8 (30.4)	86.9 (30.5)	85.6 (29.8)	84.2 (29.0)	88.9 (31.6)
Mean daily maximum °F (°C)	79.0 (26.1)	78.8 (26.0)	79.0 (26.1)	78.9 (26.1)	80.6 (27.0)	82.2 (27.9)	82.8 (28.2)	83.2 (28.4)	83.3 (28.5)	82.6 (28.1)	80.8 (27.1)	79.4 (26.3)	80.8 (27.1)
Daily mean °F (°C)	71.4 (21.9)	71.2 (21.8)	71.8 (22.1)	72.2 (22.3)	73.7 (23.2)	75.2 (24.0)	76.1 (24.5)	76.4 (24.7)	76.2 (24.6)	75.6 (24.2)	74.1 (23.4)	72.3 (22.4)	73.9 (23.3)
Mean daily minimum °F (°C)	63.8 (17.7)	63.5 (17.5)	64.6 (18.1)	65.5 (18.6)	66.9 (19.4)	68.2 (20.1)	69.2 (20.7)	69.3 (20.7)	69.7 (20.9)	69.1 (20.6)	67.3 (19.6)	65.1 (18.4)	66.9 (19.4)
Mean minimum °F (°C)	59.0 (15.0)	58.5 (14.7)	60.3 (15.7)	62.0 (16.7)	63.1 (17.3)	65.0 (18.3)	65.8 (18.8)	66.0 (18.9)	65.6 (18.7)	64.7 (18.2)	63.2 (17.3)	60.5 (15.8)	57.9 (14.4)
Record low °F (°C)	54 (12)	53 (12)	54 (12)	58 (14)	59 (15)	61 (16)	62 (17)	63 (17)	61 (16)	62 (17)	58 (14)	55 (13)	53 (12)
Average rainfall inches (mm)	9.26 (235)	9.56 (243)	13.43 (341)	11.54 (293)	8.12 (206)	7.37 (187)	10.81 (275)	9.85 (250)	9.94 (252)	9.77 (248)	15.50 (394)	11.57 (294)	126.72 (3,219)
Average rainy days (≥ 0.01 in)	16.3	15.8	21.4	24.9	23.5	25.1	26.8	26.8	24.3	23.6	23.0	20.6	272.1
Average relative humidity (%)	76.6	76.0	78.1	80.2	78.9	77.4	79.5	79.5	79.2	80.0	80.3	78.7	78.7
Mean monthly sunshine hours	161.0	152.0	152.7	135.9	155.0	176.9	167.2	174.9	161.5	136.3	115.0	129.0	1,817.4
Percentage possible sunshine	47	47	41	36	38	44	41	44	44	38	34	38	41
Source: NOAA (relative humidity and sun 1961−1990)

Climate data for Honolulu International Airport (1991−2020 normals, (Note: Mean monthly maxima and minima (i.e. the expected highest and lowest temperature readings at any point during the year or given month) calculated based on data at said location from 1991 to 2020.) extremes 1877−present (Note: Official records for Honolulu have been kept at downtown from February 1877 to September 1949, and at Honolulu Int'l since October 1949. For more information, see ThreadEx))
Month	Jan	Feb	Mar	Apr	May	Jun	Jul	Aug	Sep	Oct	Nov	Dec	Year
Record high °F (°C)	91 (33)	91 (33)	89 (32)	94 (34)	93 (34)	96 (36)	98 (37)	97 (36)	96 (36)	94 (34)	93 (34)	90 (32)	98 (37)
Mean maximum °F (°C)	86.3 (30.2)	85.9 (29.9)	87.1 (30.6)	88.0 (31.1)	89.5 (31.9)	93.3 (34.1)	95.4 (35.2)	94.1 (34.5)	92.2 (33.4)	91.1 (32.8)	87.3 (30.7)	86.8 (30.4)	90.1 (32.3)
Mean daily maximum °F (°C)	80.0 (26.7)	80.5 (26.9)	82.5 (28.1)	85.0 (29.4)	88.5 (31.4)	91.0 (32.8)	92.5 (33.6)	93.0 (33.9)	92.0 (33.3)	86.9 (30.5)	84.1 (28.9)	81.8 (27.7)	93.0 (33.9)
Daily mean °F (°C)	72.0 (22.2)	72.3 (22.4)	73.7 (23.2)	75.5 (24.2)	78.3 (25.7)	80.7 (27.1)	81.9 (27.7)	82.2 (27.9)	81.4 (27.4)	77.7 (25.4)	75.2 (24.0)	73.2 (22.9)	77.0 (25.0)
Mean daily minimum °F (°C)	64.0 (17.8)	64.2 (17.9)	64.8 (18.2)	66.0 (18.9)	68.2 (20.1)	70.4 (21.3)	71.3 (21.8)	71.5 (21.9)	70.8 (21.6)	68.5 (20.3)	66.2 (19.0)	64.6 (18.1)	64.0 (17.8)
Mean minimum °F (°C)	56.5 (13.6)	61.2 (16.2)	61.5 (16.4)	62.0 (16.7)	62.5 (16.9)	67.2 (19.6)	68.5 (20.3)	68.8 (20.4)	67.8 (19.9)	62.2 (16.8)	61.8 (16.6)	57.2 (14.0)	63.1 (17.3)
Record low °F (°C)	52.1 (11.2)	48.8 (9.3)	51.4 (10.8)	54.6 (12.6)	58.4 (14.7)	61.7 (16.5)	61.8 (16.6)	61.7 (16.5)	62.9 (17.2)	60.1 (15.6)	55.9 (13.3)	54.1 (12.3)	48.8 (9.3)
Average precipitation inches (mm)	1.84 (47)	1.94 (49)	2.36 (60)	0.77 (20)	0.82 (21)	0.50 (13)	0.52 (13)	0.84 (21)	0.88 (22)	1.51 (38)	2.25 (57)	2.18 (55)	16.41 (417)
Average precipitation days (≥ 0.01 in)	7.7	7.6	8.7	7.5	6.0	6.3	7.3	5.7	7.2	7.7	8.6	8.9	89.2
Average relative humidity (%)	73.3	70.8	68.8	67.3	66.1	64.4	64.6	64.1	65.5	67.5	70.4	72.4	67.9
Mean monthly sunshine hours	213.5	212.7	259.2	251.8	280.6	286.1	306.2	303.1	278.8	244.0	200.4	199.5	3,035.9
Percentage possible sunshine	63	66	69	66	69	71	74	76	76	68	60	59	68
Average ultraviolet index	6.8	8.5	10.2	11.2	11.6	11.8	12.2	12.2	11.1	8.9	6.8	6.0	9.7
Source 1: NOAA (relative humidity and sun 1961–1990)
Source 2: UV Index Today (1995 to 2022)

Honolulu

Climate chart (precipitation, max. and min. temperature)
J	F	M	A	M	J	J	A	S	O	N	D
2.3 80 66	2 80 66	2 81 68	0.6 83 69	0.6 85 71	0.3 87 73	0.5 88 75	0.6 89 75	0.7 89 74	1.8 87 73	2.4 84 71	3.2 81 68
- █ Average max. and min. temperatures in °F
- █ Precipitation totals in inches
- Source: National Climate Data Center
Metric conversion
J	F	M	A	M	J	J	A	S	O	N	D
59 27 19	51 27 19	51 27 20	16 28 21	16 29 22	6.6 31 23	13 31 24	14 32 24	18 31 24	47 30 23	61 29 22	82 27 20
- █ Average max. and min. temperatures in °C
- █ Precipitation totals in mm

Hilo

Climate chart (precipitation, max. and min. temperature)
J	F	M	A	M	J	J	A	S	O	N	D
9.3 79 64	9.6 79 64	13 79 65	12 79 66	8.1 81 67	7.4 82 68	11 83 69	9.9 83 70	9.9 83 69	9.8 83 69	16 81 67	12 79 65
- █ Average max. and min. temperatures in °F
- █ Precipitation totals in inches
- Source: National Climate Data Center
Metric conversion
J	F	M	A	M	J	J	A	S	O	N	D
235 26 18	243 26 18	341 26 18	293 26 19	206 27 19	187 28 20	275 28 21	250 28 21	252 29 21	248 28 20	394 27 20	294 26 18
- █ Average max. and min. temperatures in °C
- █ Precipitation totals in mm

Kahului

Climate chart (precipitation, max. and min. temperature)
J	F	M	A	M	J	J	A	S	O	N	D
2.9 81 63	1.9 81 63	2.5 81 64	1.6 82 66	0.7 84 67	0.2 86 70	0.5 87 71	0.5 88 71	0.4 88 70	1.2 87 70	2.2 84 68	3.4 82 65
- █ Average max. and min. temperatures in °F
- █ Precipitation totals in inches
- Source: National Climate Data Center
Metric conversion
J	F	M	A	M	J	J	A	S	O	N	D
73 27 17	48 27 17	62 27 18	39 28 19	19 29 20	5.1 30 21	13 31 22	13 31 22	9.7 31 21	30 30 21	56 29 20	85 28 18
- █ Average max. and min. temperatures in °C
- █ Precipitation totals in mm

Līhuʻe

Climate chart (precipitation, max. and min. temperature)
J	F	M	A	M	J	J	A	S	O	N	D
3.8 78 66	3.2 78 66	4.6 78 67	2.3 79 69	2.1 81 70	1.6 83 73	1.9 84 74	2.1 85 75	2.1 85 74	3.8 83 73	4.5 81 71	5.2 79 68
- █ Average max. and min. temperatures in °F
- █ Precipitation totals in inches
- Source: National Climate Data Center
Metric conversion
J	F	M	A	M	J	J	A	S	O	N	D
95 26 19	80 25 19	117 26 19	57 26 20	53 27 21	41 29 23	47 29 23	54 29 24	54 29 23	97 29 23	113 27 22	132 26 20
- █ Average max. and min. temperatures in °C
- █ Precipitation totals in mm

Lānaʻi City

Climate chart (precipitation, max. and min. temperature)
J	F	M	A	M	J	J	A	S	O	N	D
2.5 76 60	1.6 76 60	1.6 77 61	0.9 78 61	0.5 80 63	0.6 82 65	0.4 83 66	0.5 84 67	0.9 83 67	1.4 82 66	2.4 79 64	2.2 77 61
- █ Average max. and min. temperatures in °F
- █ Precipitation totals in inches
- Source: National Climate Data Center
Metric conversion
J	F	M	A	M	J	J	A	S	O	N	D
63 24 15	41 25 16	41 25 16	22 26 16	13 26 17	16 28 18	11 28 19	11 29 19	24 28 19	35 28 19	61 26 18	57 25 16
- █ Average max. and min. temperatures in °C
- █ Precipitation totals in mm

== See also ==
- Climate of the United States
- Climate of Hawaiʻi, with an interactive map, from the Geography Department, University of Hawaiʻi at Mānoa
