= Mount Nanlaud =

Mountain in the Federated States of Micronesia

- Location within Federated States of Micronesia

Highest point
- Elevation: 782 m (2,566 ft)
- Prominence: 782 m (2,566 ft)
- Listing: Country high point
- Coordinates: 6°52′25″N 158°13′43″E

Geography
- Location: Pohnpei, FSM

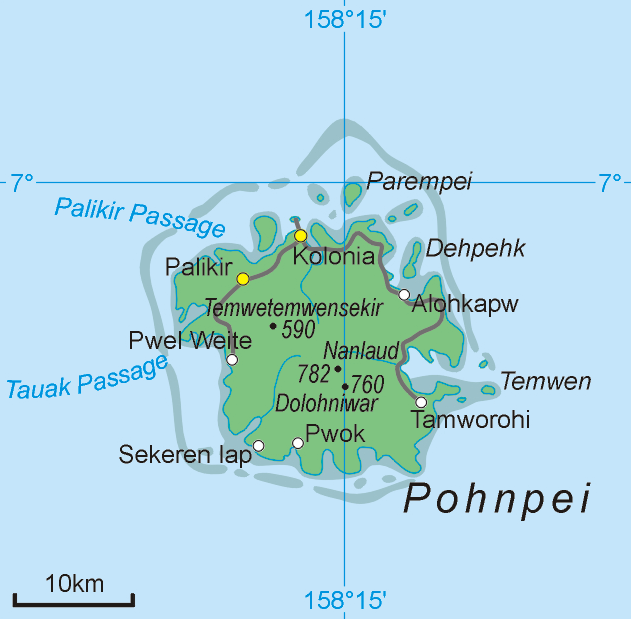
Map of Pohnpei Island showing Nanlaud

Mount Nanlaud is the highest point of the Federated States of Micronesia and of the Micronesian island of Pohnpei at 2,566 feet (782 m) as indicated on the definitive USGS 1:25,000 scale topographic survey. It is located in the southern part of the island on the border between the northeastern corner of Kitti Municipality and the southern tip of Nett Municipality. Nanlaud is the second highest mountain in Micronesia after Mount Agrihan in the Northern Mariana Islands at 3,165 feet (965 m).

Some sources misread the nearby "772" point elevation from the USGS survey; on that map, the peak labeled "Nanlaud" has a 780-meter contour, as does the second-highest peak, 1.4 km to the southeast of Nanlaud, labeled "Ngihneni". Dolohmwar (Totolom), the third highest peak at 760 meters, is an additional 0.8 km along the ridge from “Ngihneni”.

Mount Nanlaud is one of the wettest locations on Earth, with 10,160 mm (400 in.) of rain per year.
