= Geography of the Federated States of Micronesia =

Geography of Federated States of Micronesia
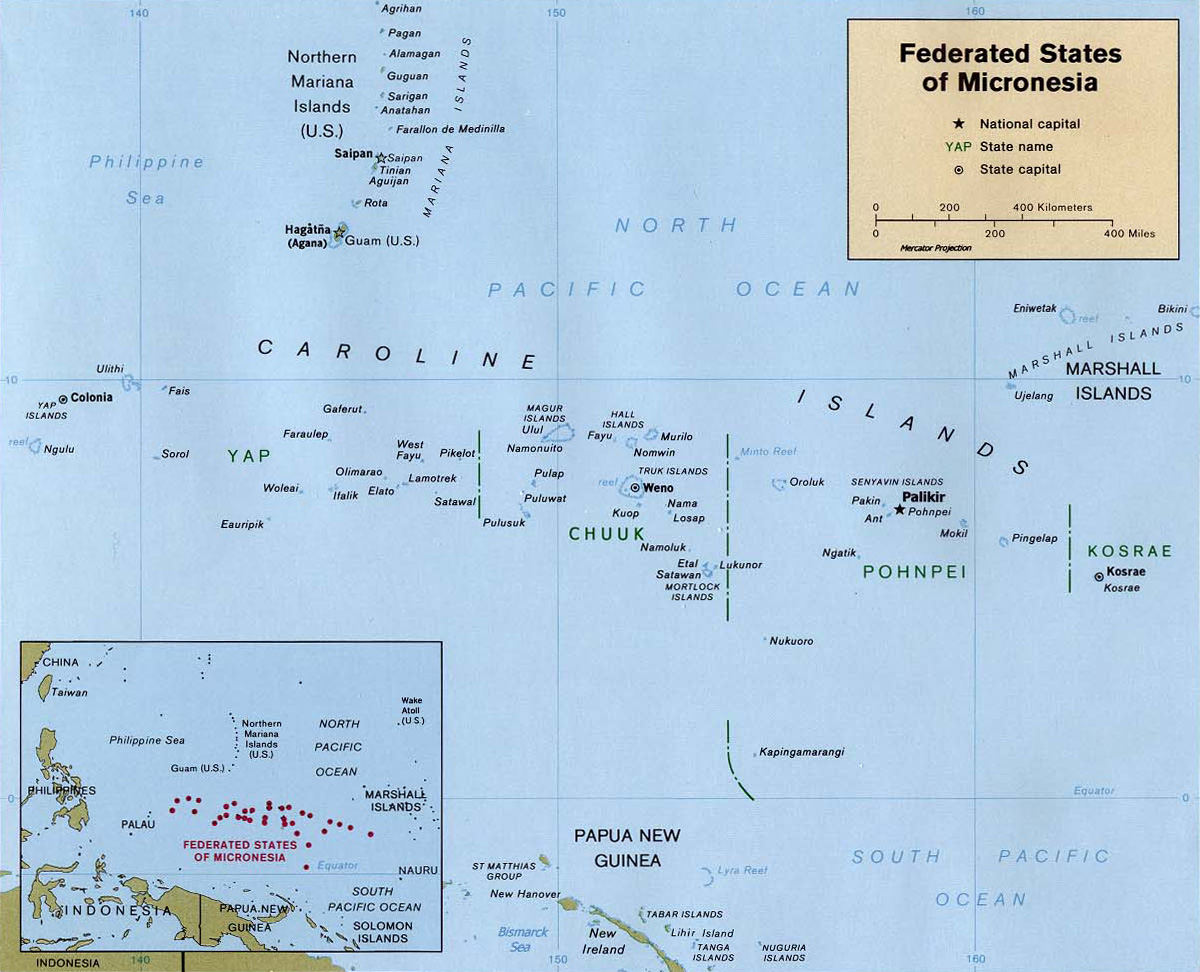
- Continent: Pacific Ocean
- Region: Oceania
- Coordinates: 6°55′N 158°15′E
- Area: Ranked 176th
  - Total: 702 km^{2} (271 sq mi)
  - Land: 100%
  - Water: 0%
- Coastline: 6,112 km (3,798 mi)
- Borders: None
- Highest point: Nanlaud on Pohnpei; 782 m (2,566 ft)
- Lowest point: Pacific Ocean; 0 m
- Exclusive economic zone: 2,996,419 km^{2} (1,156,924 mi^{2})

Geography of the Federated States of Micronesia (FSM), a country located in the western Pacific Ocean, and in the Micronesia cultural and ecological sub-region of Oceania. While its total land area is very small at 702 km^{2} (271 sq mi), it has the 14th largest exclusive economic zone at 2,996,419 km^{2} (1,156,924 mi^{2}).

== Geography ==
The country consists of 607 islands extending 2,900 kilometers (1,800 miles) across the Caroline Islands Archipelago. They are east of the Philippine Islands, and north of the island of New Guinea. The federal capital is Palikir, on Pohnpei island.

The 607 islands are grouped into four states, and from west to east are:

- Yap State
- Chuuk State — before 1990 named Truk.
- Pohnpei State — before 1985 named Ponape.
- Kosrae State

Separated from the main islands in southern Pohnpei State are the two islands of Nukuoro and Kapingamarangi. They are geographically part of the Micronesia region, but the population are linguistically and culturally part of the Polynesia region. The indigenous languages spoken on these two islands are in the Samoic family of Polynesian languages.

=== Location ===
The Federated States of Micronesia are an island group in the Caroline Islands Archipelago of the western Pacific Ocean, in the Micronesia sub-region of Oceania.

Located about three-quarters of the way from Hawaii to Indonesia at Geographic coordinates: 6°55′N 158°15′E
Map references are Oceania and Micronesia.

=== Dimensions ===
Area:

- Land area — 702 square kilometers (271 mi^{2})
- Water area (freshwater) — 0 square kilometers (0 mi^{2})
- Total area — 702 square kilometers (271 mi^{2})

The country's total area is four times the size of Washington, D.C. in the U.S.

Coastline: The combined coastlines of the country's 607 islands equal 6,112 km (3,798 mi).

Maritime claims:

- Territorial sea (12 nmi) —
- Exclusive economic zone (200 nmi) — 2,996,419 km^{2} (1,156,924 mi^{2})

=== Terrain ===
The country's 607 islands vary from high mountainous ones to low coral atolls. Geologically, there are volcanic rock outcroppings on the islands of Pohnpei, Kosrae, and Chuuk.

==== Elevation extremes ====
- Lowest point — shoreline mean sea level of the Pacific Ocean — 0 m (0 ft)
- Highest point — Nanlaud on Pohnpei at 782 m (2,566 ft) as indicated on the definitive USGS 1:25,000 scale topographic survey.

==== Extreme points ====
The extreme points of the Federated States of Micronesia, the landforms that are farther north, south, east or west — than any other location in the country.

- Northernmost point — Mogmog islet, Ulithi Atoll, Yap State.
- Easternmost point — unnamed headland on Kosrae island, Kosrae State.
- Southernmost point — Kapingamarangi atoll, Pohnpei State.
- Westernmost point — Ngulu Atoll, Yap State.

== Environment ==
Environment—current issues: Overfishing, land and water pollution.

Environment—international agreements:

- Party to — Biodiversity, Climate Change-Kyoto Protocol, Desertification, Hazardous Wastes, Law of the Sea, Ozone Layer Protection.
- Signed, but not ratified — none of the selected agreements

=== Land use ===
- Arable land — 2.86%
- Permanent crops — 24.29%
- Other — 72.86%
- Irrigated land — none

Products: Tropical woods and lumber, marine products, deep-seabed minerals, surface mined phosphate.

=== Climate ===
The Federated States of Micronesia enjoys a tropical climate, with quite even, warm temperatures throughout the year.

Precipitation is generally plentiful, with heavy year-round rainfall. Pohnpei reputedly is one of the wettest places on earth, with up to 330 inches (8.4 m) of rain per year. Nevertheless, drought conditions do occur periodically throughout FSM, especially when the El Niño condition moves into the Western Pacific, when groundwater supplies can dwindle to emergency proportions.

Climate data for Palikir (Köppen Af)
Month	Jan	Feb	Mar	Apr	May	Jun	Jul	Aug	Sep	Oct	Nov	Dec	Year
Mean daily maximum °C (°F)	29.9 (85.8)	30.0 (86.0)	30.2 (86.4)	30.2 (86.4)	30.3 (86.5)	30.4 (86.7)	30.6 (87.1)	30.8 (87.4)	30.9 (87.6)	30.9 (87.6)	30.7 (87.3)	30.3 (86.5)	30.4 (86.8)
Daily mean °C (°F)	26.8 (80.2)	26.9 (80.4)	27.1 (80.8)	26.9 (80.4)	26.9 (80.4)	26.8 (80.2)	26.6 (79.9)	26.7 (80.1)	26.8 (80.2)	26.8 (80.2)	26.8 (80.2)	27.0 (80.6)	26.8 (80.3)
Mean daily minimum °C (°F)	23.8 (74.8)	23.9 (75.0)	24.0 (75.2)	23.7 (74.7)	23.6 (74.5)	23.3 (73.9)	22.7 (72.9)	22.6 (72.7)	22.7 (72.9)	22.7 (72.9)	22.9 (73.2)	23.7 (74.7)	23.3 (74.0)
Average precipitation mm (inches)	377 (14.8)	279 (11.0)	353 (13.9)	462 (18.2)	502 (19.8)	464 (18.3)	504 (19.8)	515 (20.3)	464 (18.3)	469 (18.5)	421 (16.6)	392 (15.4)	5,202 (204.9)
Source: Climate-Data.org

Climate data for Tafunsak (Köppen Af)
Month	Jan	Feb	Mar	Apr	May	Jun	Jul	Aug	Sep	Oct	Nov	Dec	Year
Mean daily maximum °C (°F)	30.2 (86.4)	30.1 (86.2)	30.1 (86.2)	30.0 (86.0)	30.2 (86.4)	30.2 (86.4)	30.2 (86.4)	30.7 (87.3)	30.7 (87.3)	30.8 (87.4)	30.6 (87.1)	30.2 (86.4)	30.3 (86.6)
Daily mean °C (°F)	27.5 (81.5)	27.4 (81.3)	27.4 (81.3)	27.2 (81.0)	27.4 (81.3)	27.3 (81.1)	27.1 (80.8)	27.5 (81.5)	27.4 (81.3)	27.5 (81.5)	27.4 (81.3)	27.4 (81.3)	27.4 (81.3)
Mean daily minimum °C (°F)	24.8 (76.6)	24.7 (76.5)	24.7 (76.5)	24.5 (76.1)	24.6 (76.3)	24.4 (75.9)	24.1 (75.4)	24.3 (75.7)	24.2 (75.6)	24.3 (75.7)	24.3 (75.7)	24.6 (76.3)	24.5 (76.0)
Average rainfall mm (inches)	396 (15.6)	479 (18.9)	496 (19.5)	577 (22.7)	490 (19.3)	451 (17.8)	445 (17.5)	414 (16.3)	383 (15.1)	344 (13.5)	412 (16.2)	506 (19.9)	5,393 (212.3)
Source: Climate-Data.org

==== Natural hazards ====
Tropical typhoons are an annual threat, from June to December. The country is located on southern edge of the typhoon belt, with occasionally severe damage, particularly to the low-lying atolls.

Tsunamis and rising sea levels are other natural threats.

== See also ==
- Micronesia — sub-region of Oceania.
- Melanesia — sub-region to the south.
- Polynesia — sub-region to the east.
- Geography of Oceania
