= Military history of Oceania =

Although the military history of Oceania probably goes back thousands of years to the first human settlement in the region, little is known about war in Oceania until the arrival of Europeans. The introduction of firearms transformed conflict in the region; in some cases helping to unify regions and in others sparking large-scale tribal and civil wars. Force and the threat of force played a role in the annexation of most of Oceania to various European and American powers, but only in Australia and New Zealand did wars of conquest occur. Western Oceania was a major site of conflict in World War II as the Japanese Empire sought to expand southwards. Since 1945 the region has been mostly at peace, although Melanesia has suffered from Indonesian expansionism in some areas and civil wars and coups in others. The Australian Defence Force has the largest military force in Oceania.

Political map of Oceania

== Pre-European warfare ==
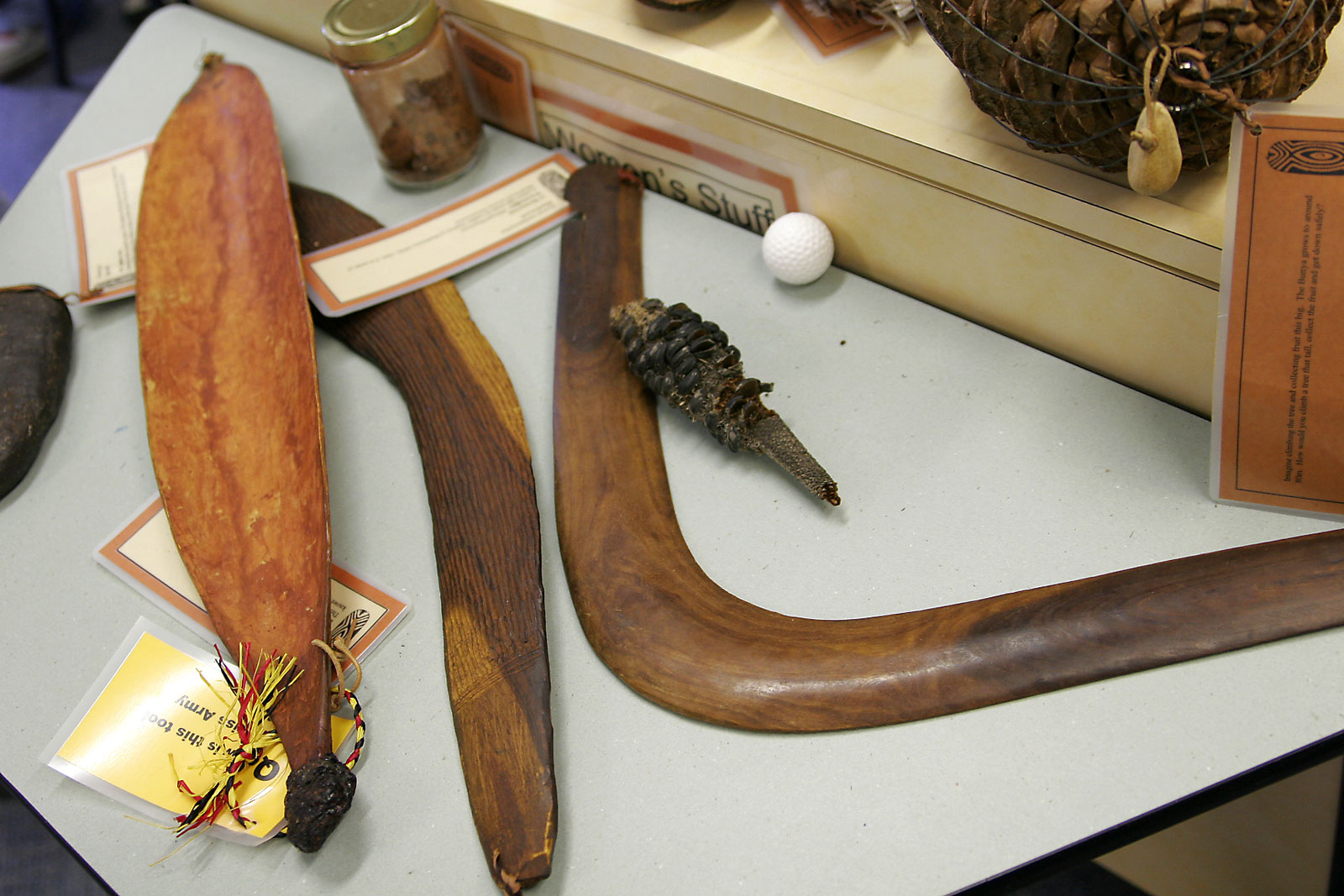
At left, an Australian Aboriginal spear-thrower (called woomera in the Eora language)

Violent conflict was common to nearly all the peoples of Oceania in the period before European arrival, although there is much debate about the frequency of warfare, which of course varied between different societies. Some scholars have argued that peaceful societies are very unusual, with Lawrence H. Keeley of the University of Illinois calculating that 87% of tribal societies were at war more than once per year, and some 65% of them were fighting continuously. For instance, in Arnhem Land in northern Australia, a study of warfare among the Murngin people in the late-19th century found that over a 20-year period no less than 200 out of 800 men, or 25 percent of all adult males, had been killed in intertribal warfare. On the other hand, New Zealand historian James Belich cautions against the assumption that tribal societies were inevitably in a constant state of war, pointing out that oral histories tend to emphasise warfare rather than peace even if there is far more of the latter than the former, and that estimating the frequency of war based on the number of weapons and fortifications is like estimating the number of house fires based on the number of insurance policies. However it is clear that in most societies warriors were held in high esteem and that completely pacifist societies were very unusual. One exception was the Moriori of the Chatham Islands.

A range of weapons were used in Oceania. These included the woomera and boomerang in Australia, and the bow in some parts of Melanesia and Polynesia. Nearly all Oceanic peoples had spears and clubs, although the Māori of New Zealand were unusual in having no distance weapons. Weapons could be very simple or elaborately crafted, with distance weapons in particular requiring a great deal of craftsmanship to be accurate. It has been estimated that Aboriginal spears were more accurate than nineteenth-century European firearms.

Most pre-European conflicts in Oceania took place between peoples with a shared culture, and often language. However, there were also wars between peoples of different cultures, for example in Australia and Papua New Guinea, each of which contains many different cultures, and in central Polynesia, where island groups are close enough for parties of war canoes to travel to other territories.

== Impact of European contact ==
The arrival of Europeans in Oceania had dramatic consequences, especially in parts of the area which had no previous contact with Asia. In many cases European weapons, transport and sometimes troops massively upset an existing balance of power. One example of this was the New Zealand Musket Wars in which iwi (tribes) with muskets attacked iwi who lacked them. Serious warfare raged throughout New Zealand for nearly thirty years, only ending when all tribes had acquired muskets. The presence of European ships also affected Māori warfare, for example enabling Māori to travel to the Chatham Islands, where they almost wiped out the Moriori. The presence of firearms could also turn what would otherwise have been minor squabbles into full-scale wars. One such was the Nauruan Tribal War, which lasted for a decade and ultimately resulted in the annexation of Nauru by Germany. In other parts of the Pacific, particular leaders were able to use their contacts with Europeans to unify their islands. One leader who did this was the Fijian chief Tanoa Visawaqa who, in the 1840s, used arms purchased from a Swedish mercenary to subdue most of Western Fiji. Tonga was also united into a kingdom around this time.

Armed force, or the threat thereof, was sometimes used to gain European sovereignty over Oceanic nations. One example of this was the 'Bayonet Constitution' of Hawaii. This was not the only method of winning sovereignty. In some cases a treaty was peacefully agreed to, but even in these cases violence or the fear of it was often still a factor. For example, New Zealand's Treaty of Waitangi was presented to Māori partly as a way to prevent a French invasion and partly as a way to stop intertribal warfare; while Tonga became a British protected state as a result of an attempt to oust the Tongan king. In other parts of the region, such as Australia, European sovereignty was simply proclaimed without any attempt to win the consent of the indigenous peoples. In many cases, including those in which sovereignty had been ceded more or less voluntarily, force and the threat of force were required to maintain European dominance.

== Wars of colonisation ==
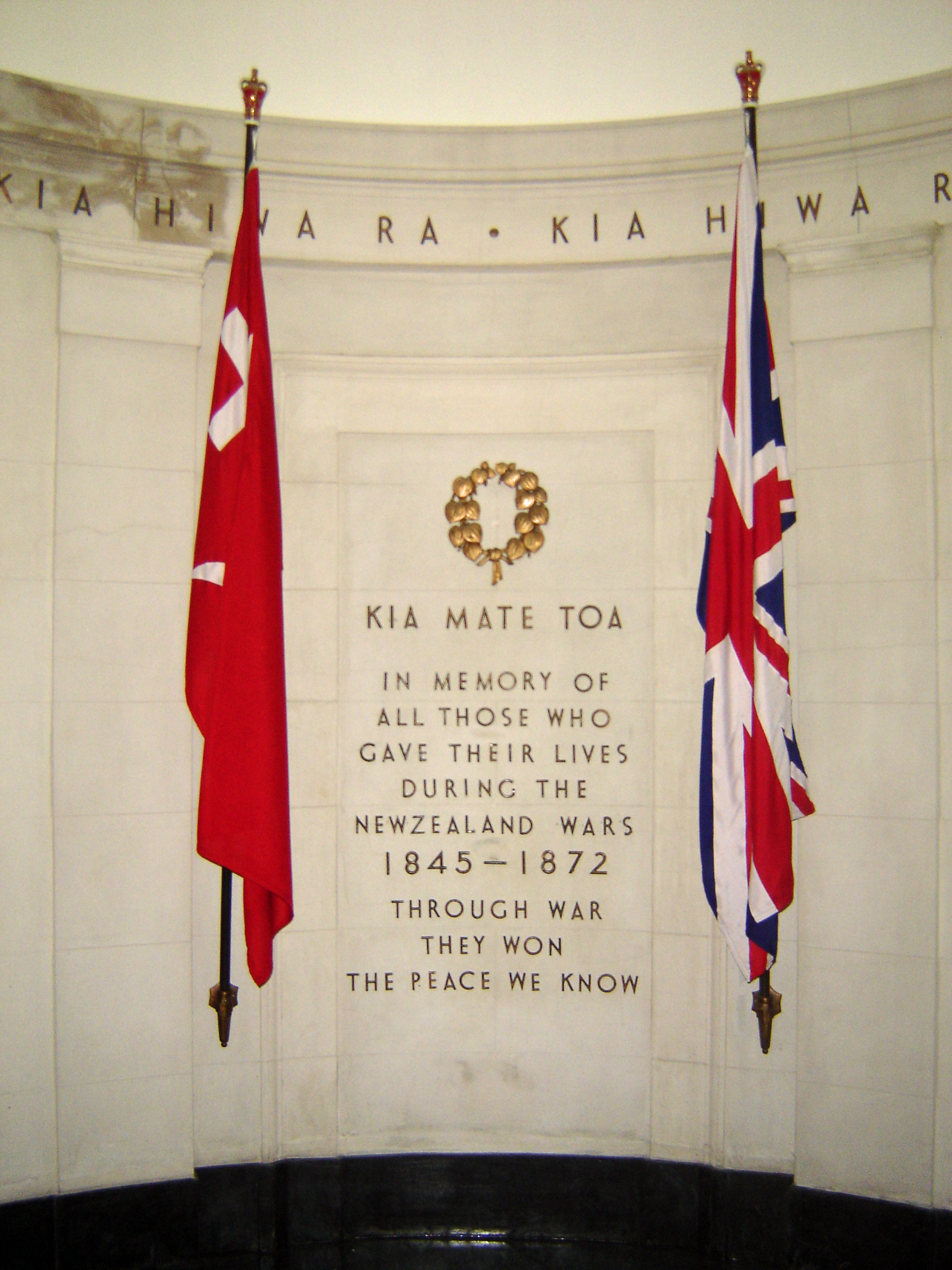
A room at the Auckland War Memorial Museum commemorates those who died, both European and Māori, in the New Zealand Wars

Although virtually every part of Oceania was at some point annexed by a foreign power, in most cases there was no major European settlement. The smallness of most Pacific islands coupled with their lack of resources or strategic importance meant that during the nineteenth century they were targets for neither large-scale immigration nor substantial military involvement. The majority of Europeans in most of the islands were colonial administrators, missionaries and traders. The two major exceptions to this were Australia and New Zealand, both of which had enough land and cool enough climates to attract huge numbers of British settlers. These were initially welcomed by most Māori and rejected by most Australian Aborigines, but in both cases wars broke out; In Australia, when settlers wanted more land than the indigenous peoples were willing to part with, land was the primary motivation. In New Zealand, although land was an issue, major conflicts were primarily over who controlled the country. In Australia there was a mixture of battles, guerrilla tactics and genocide, while in New Zealand fighting was characterised by assaults on complicated defensive positions, pā, though on occasion warfare was more or less conventional and on other occasions both sides used guerrilla tactics. There was a distinct difference in scale - at the height of the New Zealand Wars 18,000 English troops were required, in addition to settler and "loyal native" forces to contain the belligerent minority of the well armed and militarily competent Māori. Nevertheless, in both cases 'native resistance' was eventually subdued although in Australia occasional fighting continued into the twentieth century.

== World War I ==
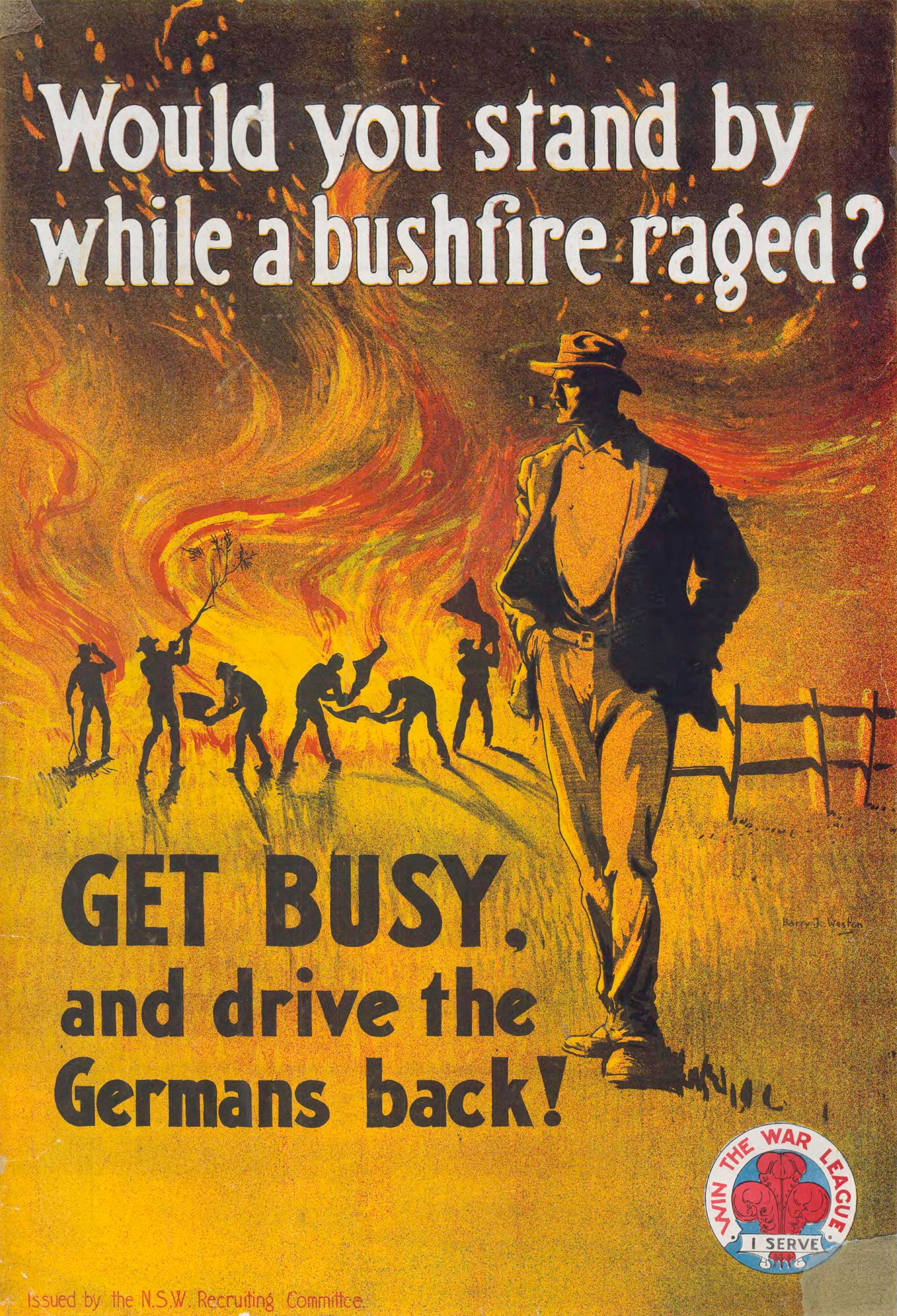
An Australian World War I recruiting poster.

Although World War I occurred almost entirely in Europe and the Middle East, Oceania was involved in a number of ways. British settlers and their descendants in Australia and New Zealand enthusiastically signed up to fight for their 'mother country', as did some Māori. Australian and New Zealand troops, joined together in ANZAC formations, fought and died in large numbers in the Gallipoli Campaign, the Western Front and in the Sinai and Palestine Campaign in the Middle East.

In Oceania itself, islands possessed by Germany were invaded by Japan (see Japan during World War I), Australia (German New Guinea and Nauru), and New Zealand (German Samoa), with little serious resistance apart from the Battle of Bita Paka in German New Guinea.

After the war the islands were granted to their new conquerors by the League of Nations as mandated territories. In this way, Japan took control of the Mariana Islands, Caroline Islands and Marshall Islands, while Australia took over German New Guinea and New Zealand took over German Samoa. Nauru was administered by the United Kingdom in conjunction with Australia and New Zealand.

== World War II ==
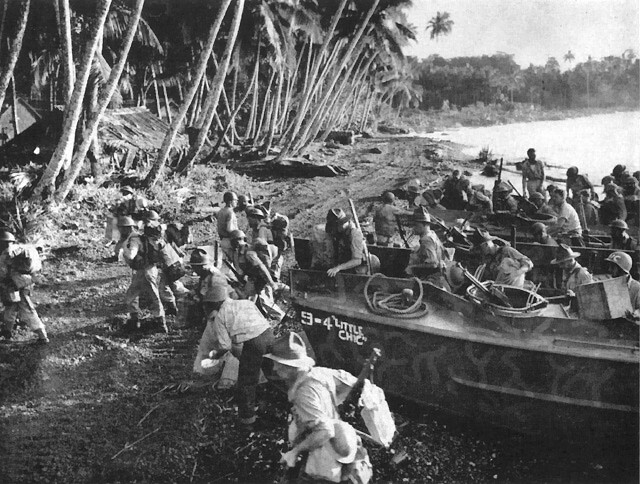
New Zealand troops land on Vella Lavella, in the Solomon Islands.

The western Pacific was a major site of fighting between Japan and the United States-led Allies. Japan conquered most of Melanesia and South-East Asia, and brought the United States into the war by bombing the US possession of Hawaii at Pearl Harbor. The inhabitants of areas conquered by the Japanese were often harshly treated; for example 1,200 Nauruans were forcibly transported as labour to the Chuuk islands, where 463 died. Papua New Guinea was a major battleground, and the Japanese possessions taken from Germany during World War I were re-taken by the United States, with the Mariana Islands serving as a US bombing base. New Zealand and most of Polynesia remained relatively untouched by the war, apart from the sending of troops and the visits of American servicemen on rest and recreation leave.

As with the First World War, New Zealand and Australia were enthusiastic defenders of Britain in World War II, and some other member countries of the British Empire also sent troops. New Zealand forces served primarily in Europe, fighting in Greece, North Africa and Italy, but with some forces serving in Singapore, Fiji, and in the Solomon Islands campaign. Australia initially sent troops to Europe, but most were recalled to the Pacific following Japan's push southward, which included air raids on Darwin and other parts of Australia in 1942-43. Australian soldiers fought crucial battles along the Kokoda Track in Papua New Guinea and in the Borneo campaign.

== Post 1945 ==
Throughout the second half of the twentieth century and into the twenty-first, Oceania was mostly peaceful. Exceptions to this was Melanesia (where there were attempts by Indonesia to extend its territory in the area), a civil war in Bougainville and several coups in Fiji. During this time many Pacific nations won their independence, usually peacefully. However a number of islands remained territories of European, Asian and American powers, and several were used as nuclear testing sites. In the 1970s, these activities became highly controversial. Meanwhile, several Oceanic countries, notably Australia and New Zealand, contributed combat and peacekeeping troops to a range of conflicts outside of Oceania.

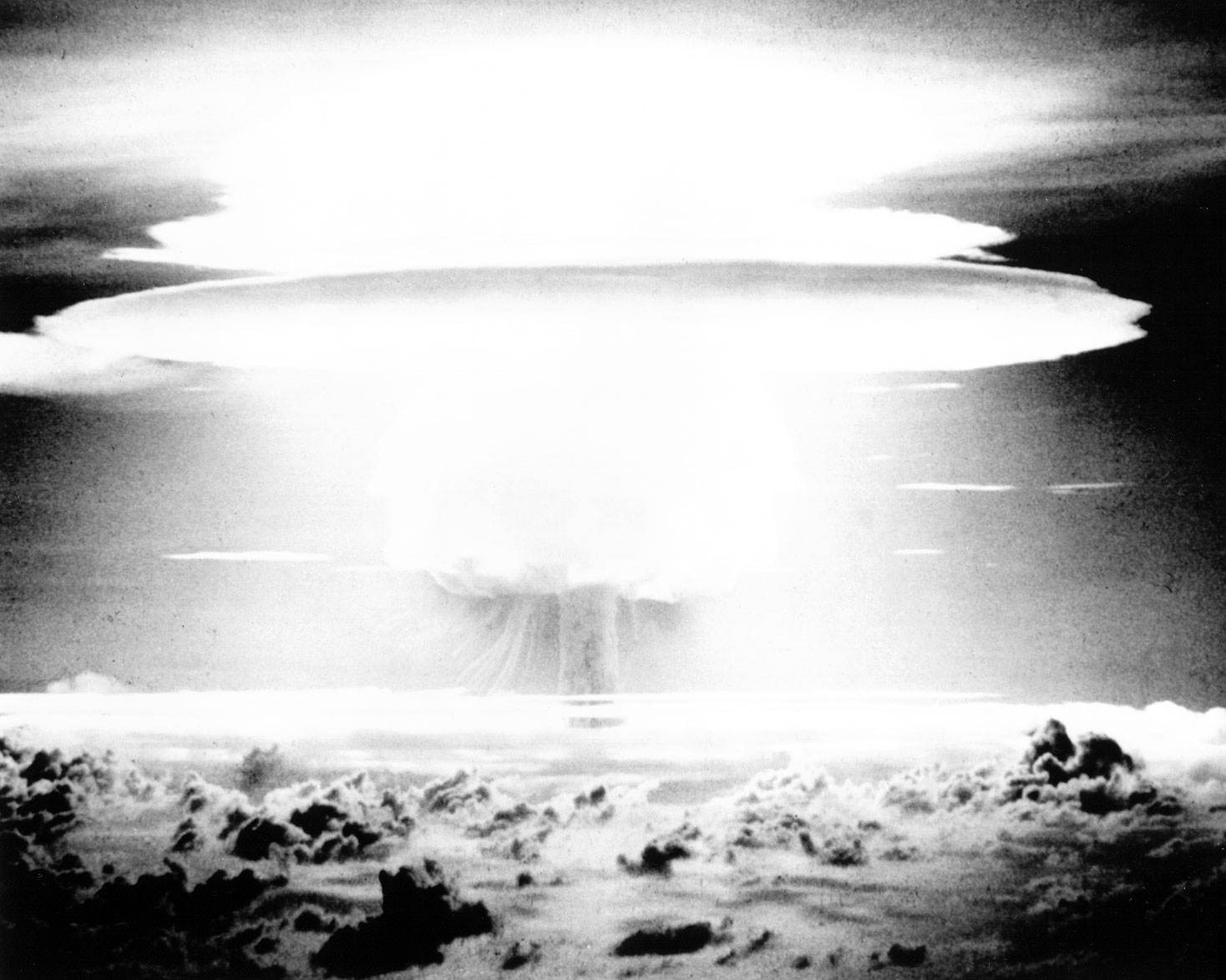
The Castle Bravo mushroom cloud.

=== Nuclear testing in Oceania ===
Due to its low population, Oceania was a popular location for atmospheric and underground nuclear tests. Tests were conducted in various locations by the United Kingdom (Operation Grapple and Operation Antler), the United States (Bikini atoll and the Marshall Islands) and France (Moruroa), often with devastating consequences for the inhabitants. In 1954, for example, fallout from the American Castle Bravo hydrogen bomb test in the Marshall Islands was such that the inhabitants of the Rongelap Atoll were forced to abandon their island. Three years later the islanders were allowed to return, but suffered abnormally high levels of cancer. They were evacuated again in 1985 and in 1996 given $45 million in compensation. A series of British tests were also conducted in the 1950s at Maralinga in South Australia, forcing the removal of the Pitjantjatjara and Yankunytjatjara peoples from their ancestral homelands. The atoll of Moruroa in French Polynesia became notorious as a site of French nuclear testing, primarily because tests were carried out there after most Pacific testing had ceased. These tests were opposed by most other nations in Oceania. The last atmospheric test was conducted in 1974, and the last underground test in 1996.

=== Fijian coups ===
Fiji has suffered several coups d'état: military in 1987 and 2006 and civilian in 2000. All were ultimately due to ethnic tension between indigenous Fijians and Indo-Fijians, who originally came to the islands as indentured labour in the late nineteenth and early twentieth century. The 1987 coup followed the election of a multi-ethnic coalition, which Lieutenant Colonel Sitiveni Rabuka overthrew, claiming racial discrimination against ethnic Fijians. The coup was denounced by the United Nations and Fiji was expelled from the Commonwealth of Nations.

The 2000 coup was essentially a repeat of the 1987 affair, although it was led by civilian George Speight, apparently with military support. Commodore Frank Bainimarama, who was opposed to Speight, then took over and appointed a new Prime Minister. Speight was later tried and convicted for treason. Many indigenous Fijians were unhappy at the treatment of Speight and his supporters, feeling that the coup had been legitimate. In 2006 the Fijian parliament attempted to introduce a series of bills which would have, amongst other things, pardoned those involved in the 2000 coup. Bainimarama, concerned that the legal and racial injustices of the previous coups would be perpetuated, staged his own coup. It was internationally condemned, and Fiji again suspended from the Commonwealth.

In 2006 the then Australia Defence Minister, Brendan Nelson, warned Fijian officials of an Australian Naval fleet within proximity of Fiji that would respond to any attacks against its citizens.

=== Bougainville conflict ===
From 1975, there were attempts by the Bougainville Province to secede from Papua New Guinea. These were resisted by Papua New Guinea primarily because of the presence in Bougainville of the Panguna mine, which was vital to Papua New Guinea's economy. The Bougainville Revolutionary Army began attacking the mine in 1988, forcing its closure the following year. Further BRA activity led to the declaration of a state of emergency and the conflict continued until about 2005, when successionist leader and self-proclaimed King of Bougainville Francis Ona died of malaria. Peacekeeping troops led by Australia have been in the region since the late 1990s, and a referendum on independence will be held in the 2010s.

=== Participation in non-Oceanic conflicts ===
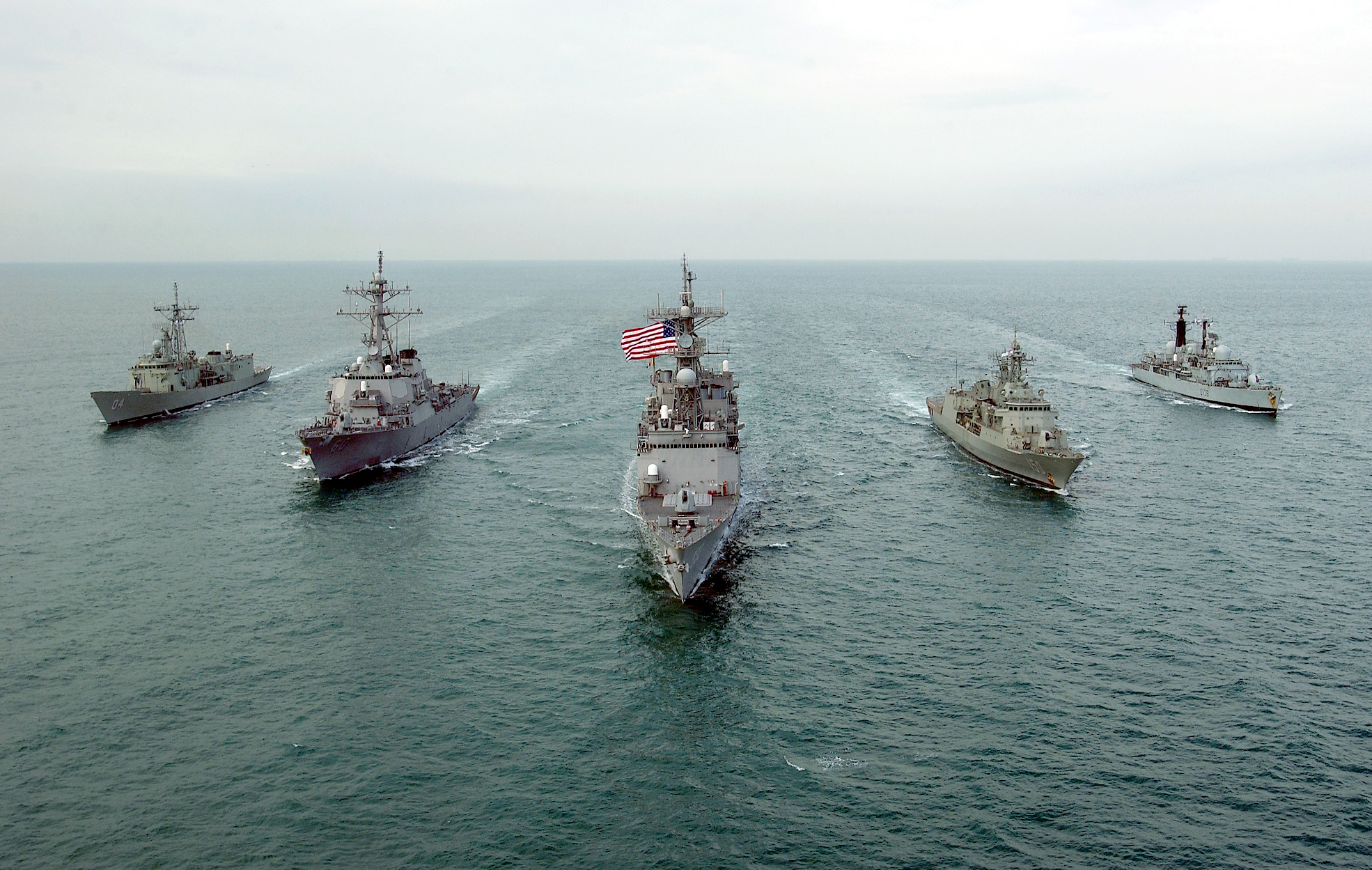
HMAS Anzac and HMAS Darwin with United States and British warships in late 2002

Oceanic military forces have played minor roles in numerous conflicts outside Oceania since 1945. The region's two biggest military powers, Australia and New Zealand, sent troops to fight in the Korean, Vietnam, Gulf and Afghanistan Wars, and Australia also participated in the Iraq War. Neither is a major military power in world terms, preferring to join with coalition operations, but both possess modern and well trained defense forces. Both have made significant contributions to international peacekeeping operations, although their focus has tended to be within Oceania.

Following the fall of Singapore in World War II, Australia and New Zealand both came to the realisation that Britain could no longer protect her former colonies in the Pacific. Accordingly, both countries desired an alliance with the United States and in 1951 the ANZUS Treaty was signed between the three countries. This meant that if a Treaty partner came under attack, the other two would be required to come to its aid. Although none of the ANZUS partners came under attack, (until, arguably, September 11, 2001, or the Rainbow Warrior bombing), both Australia and New Zealand nonetheless felt obliged to help America in its Cold War conflicts in Korea and Vietnam. Because of its close proximity to Asia, Australia has always been more worried than New Zealand about an invasion from Asia, and has thus been a more enthusiastic partner with America. New Zealand's contribution to the Vietnam War was small, whereas Australia went as far as to introduce conscription. By the 1970s, many people in both countries had begun to oppose the American alliance, not least because of Vietnam. America's role as a major nuclear power was also a strong factor in anti-American sentiment. In 1984 New Zealand enacted a ban on nuclear armed or powered ships in its waters, essentially preventing most American naval ships from visiting New Zealand. As a result, America suspended its treaty obligations to New Zealand under the ANZUS alliance. Despite this, New Zealand committed small numbers of soldiers to the 1991 Gulf and Afghanistan Wars, and has sent engineering units to Iraq. Australia has remained a strong supporter of America, it was the third largest member (by number of troops) in the 'coalition of the willing' in Iraq.

Other Oceanic nations have contributed troops to outside conflicts, although the smallness of these countries and their militaries has meant that these contributions have been fairly minimal. The military participation of smaller Oceanic countries includes Fiji sending peacekeeping troops to Lebanon in 1978 and the Sinai Peninsula in 1981, and Tonga's sending of 45 soldiers to the Iraq War for several months.
