= 2012 Hawaii hailstorm =

Weather event in Hawaii, United States

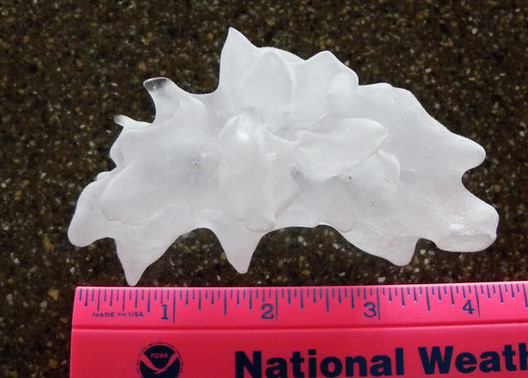
- The record-setting hailstone being measured.
- Location: Oahu, Lanai

EF0 tornado
- on the Enhanced Fujita scale

Overall effects
- Damage: $25,000

On the morning of March 9, 2012, a long-lived hailstorm hit the Hawaiian islands of Oahu and Lanai. The hailstorm was produced by a supercell thunderstorm, a storm that produces high intensity winds that change trajectory mostly in the mid and lower levels of the storm, which lead to a large amount of energy to be produced resulting in strong updrafts. This marked a memorable day for Hawaiians as these storms are usually unheard of in Hawaii and mostly are formed in the central plain of the United States. This event produced the largest hailstone ever recorded in Hawaii since records began in 1950. Many people stated that the initial hail falling from the sky could be compared to the size of a nickel, golf ball, or even a grapefruit. During the storm, the National Oceanic and Atmospheric Administration (NOAA) documented multiple reports of hail in Hawaii, with some hail measuring between 2-3 inches (5 to 7.6 cm) in diameter, and even larger ones as the storm got stronger.The hailstone was measured at 4.25 in (10 cm) long, 2.25 in (6 cm) tall, and 2 in (5 cm) wide. National Weather Service meteorologist Tom Birchard stated that the event was "unprecedented."

== Background ==
Hawaii located in the Northern and Western Hemisphere falls into a transitional period of weather from winter to summer dated to come around March 1st also known as the start of meteorological spring. To produce such large hailstorm temperatures must begin to alternate from cool to warmer temperatures. Over time temperatures begin to roughly get warmer which cause two different air masses to clash and develop a thunderstorm. The combination of Meteorological Spring and the creation of hail through the process of precipitation is what led to the record-breaking supercell hailstorm of Hawaii on March of the year 2012. It said that a supercell storm is one of the most violent storms that could possibly happen as it can follow with aggressive winds with large hail and can even lead to tornados.

== Confirmed Tornado ==
In addition to the spectacular early-morning lightning storms and flooding from the 4 feet (1.2 meters) of rainfall received, a tornadic waterspout formed off the coast of Oahu during the morning of March 9, 2012. Non-supercellular waterspouts are not uncommon (the State of Hawaii records an average of one waterspout/tornado per year), this mesocyclone-induced waterspout tracked inland for 1.5 miles, becoming an EF0 tornado that caused minor damage to the Enchanted Lakes subdivision of Kailua at 7:10 am Hawaiian-Aleutian Time. Notably, this event was significant as it marked one of the few confirmed occurrences of an EF0 tornado, which typically signifies less severe weather phenomena. However, despite its classification, this tornado could produce winds ranging from 60-70 mph which led to considerable damage in Lanikai and Enchanted Lakes. The impacts of this weather event were felt across region, highlighting the unpredictable nature of such natural disasters.

== Confirmed tornadoes ==
=== March 9 event ===
List of reported tornadoes - Friday, March 9, 2012
EF#	Location	County	Coord.	Time (UTC)	Path length	Comments/Damage
Hawaii
EF0	ESE of Kailua	Honolulu	21.40°N 157.72°W	0910	1.5 miles (2.4 km)	Tornado started as a waterspout that moved ashore. Roofs were damaged, signs and power lines were knocked down, and trees were snapped.
Sources: NWS Honolulu

== See also ==
- List of costly or deadly hailstorms
- List of Hawaii tornadoes
