= List of television stations in Oceania =

This is a list of television stations in Oceania:

- List of television stations in American Samoa
- List of television stations in Australia
- List of television stations in Borneo
- List of television stations in Fiji
- List of television stations in French Polynesia
- List of television stations in the Federated States of Micronesia
- List of television stations in New Zealand, incl. Cook Islands
- List of television stations in Papua New Guinea
- List of television stations in Samoa
- List of television stations in Tonga
- List of television stations in Western Papua and Irian
- List of television stations in the Solomon Islands

== See also ==
- Lists of television channels
