= Transport in Oceania =

- This page links to several topics related to transport in Oceania.

Transport in Oceania is most advanced in Australia, Hawaii and New Zealand, though all countries in the region have faced difficulties in providing facilities due to their low population density. Smaller islands are dependent on sea and air transport, but have had difficulties operating either national or regional airlines and shipping lines.

== Rail transport ==
Rail transport is mainly restricted to Australia and New Zealand, with some rail lines in Fiji and Nauru (and formerly in New Caledonia and Papua New Guinea).

- Australia: see Rail transport in Australia
- Fiji: see Rail transport in Fiji
- Nauru: see Rail transport in Nauru
- New Zealand: see Rail transport in New Zealand
- New Caledonia: see Nouméa-Païta railway
- Papua New Guinea: see Transport in Papua New Guinea

== See also ==
- List of town tramway systems in Oceania
