= Kaloko, Hawaii =

Unincorporated community in Hawaii, United States

Kaloko
- Census-designated place
- Location within Hawaii
- Coordinates: 19°42′22″N 155°57′48″W
- Country: United States
- State: Hawaii
- County: Hawaii

Area
  - Total: 13.51 sq mi (34.99 km^{2})
  - Land: 13.51 sq mi (34.98 km^{2})
  - Water: 0 sq mi (0.00 km^{2})
- Elevation: 2,240 ft (680 m)

Population (2020)
  - Total: 1,314
  - Density: 97.3/sq mi (37.56/km^{2})
- Time zone: UTC-10 (Hawaii–Aleutian Time Zone)
- ZIP Code: 96740 (Kailua Kona)
- Area code: 808
- FIPS code: 15-26867
- GNIS feature ID: 2806894

Kaloko is an unincorporated community and census-designated place (CDP) in Hawaii County, Hawaii, United States. It is on the western side of the island of Hawaii and is bordered to the west by Kaiminani and to the south by Holualoa. As of the 2020 census, Kaloko had a population of 1,314.

The community was first listed as a CDP prior to the 2020 census.

== Demographics ==
Historical population
| Census | Pop. | Note | %± |
|---|---|---|---|
| 2020 | 1,314 | | — |
U.S. Decennial Census

=== 2020 census ===
As of the 2020 census, Kaloko had a population of 1,314. The median age was 48.2 years. 18.0% of residents were under the age of 18 and 25.5% of residents were 65 years of age or older. For every 100 females there were 97.0 males, and for every 100 females age 18 and over there were 99.3 males age 18 and over.

2.9% of residents lived in urban areas, while 97.1% lived in rural areas.

There were 465 households in Kaloko, of which 25.4% had children under the age of 18 living in them. Of all households, 54.8% were married-couple households, 15.3% were households with a male householder and no spouse or partner present, and 20.0% were households with a female householder and no spouse or partner present. About 22.8% of all households were made up of individuals and 10.3% had someone living alone who was 65 years of age or older.

There were 522 housing units, of which 10.9% were vacant. The homeowner vacancy rate was 0.9% and the rental vacancy rate was 5.8%.

Racial composition as of the 2020 census
| Race | Number | Percent |
|---|---|---|
| White | 683 | 52.0% |
| Black or African American | 3 | 0.2% |
| American Indian and Alaska Native | 3 | 0.2% |
| Asian | 95 | 7.2% |
| Native Hawaiian and Other Pacific Islander | 163 | 12.4% |
| Some other race | 18 | 1.4% |
| Two or more races | 349 | 26.6% |
| Hispanic or Latino (of any race) | 77 | 5.9% |
