= Law in Oceania =

Legal system in the Pacific region of Oceania

Law in Oceania refers to the different legal systems within the geographical area of Oceania. Countries such as Australia and New Zealand follow in the Commonwealth tradition of common law, and until recently were subject to the United Kingdom House of Lords. Other countries and islands trace their legal heritage to different former colonialists.

== See also ==
- Legal systems of the world
