= Ka Loko Reservoir =

Lake in Kauaʻi, Hawaii, United States

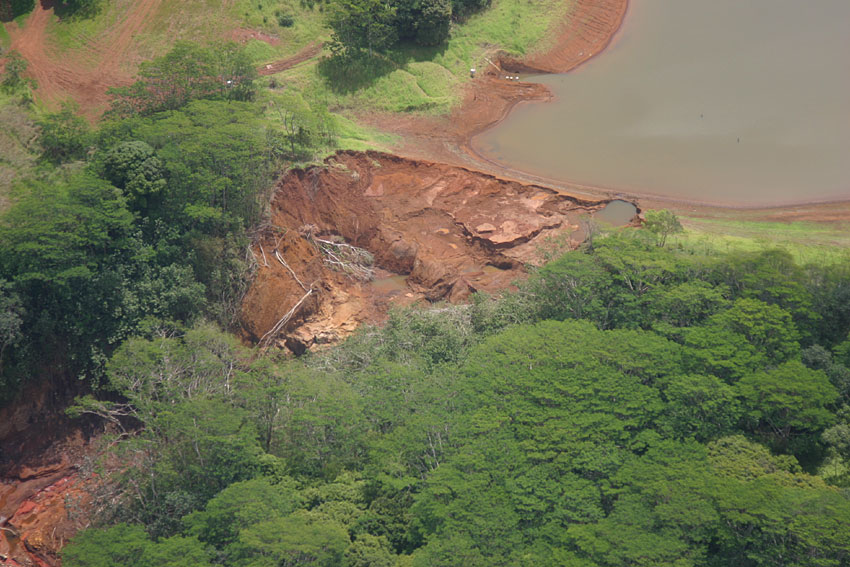
- Aerial photo of the Ka Loko Dam breach

- Location within Hawaii Location within Pacific Ocean
- Location: Kauaʻi, Hawaii
- Coordinates: 22°10′39″N 159°22′39″W
- Type: Reservoir
- Basin countries: United States

Ka Loko Reservoir is a reservoir created by an earthen dam on the island of Kauaʻi, Hawaii. It is located on the north side of the island at 22°10′39″N 159°22′39″W. Waters flow from Ka Loko Reservoir down to Waiakalua Reservoir, Waiakalua Stream and down to the Pacific Ocean.

Ka Loko (sometimes spelled Kaloko) is notable because its dam burst on March 14, 2006. The dam burst was preceded by unusually heavy rain. The flood from the dam failure raced downhill through a ravine east of the town of Kilauea, Hawaii, with a wall of water reported to be between 20 and 70 feet (6.1 and 21.3 metres) high and 200 feet (61 m) wide. The flood destroyed several homes and killed seven people, including a toddler and a pregnant woman.

An independent civil investigation attributed several possible conditions and practices that may have led to the dam failure: The State of Hawaii did not adequately inspect the dam and did not have enough dam inspectors to cover all of the antiquated dams in the state. The owner of the dam (James Pflueger) performed grading operations near the dam without permits and may have filled in the emergency spillway for the dam. Neither the current nor prior owners of the dam maintained the dam adequately.Finally, the County of Kauaʻi knew about the unpermitted grading operation, but did not enforce a stop-work order.

On November 21, 2008, James Pflueger was indicted for manslaughter and reckless endangerment in relation to the dam failure. Pflueger's lawyer claimed that the indictment was an attempt by the state of Hawaii to deflect its own responsibility in the matter. On July 17, 2013, Pflueger entered a plea of no contest to reckless endangering in a deal with prosecutors. In exchange for the plea, state prosecutors agreed to drop seven manslaughter counts.

On August 4, 2009, it was reported that a settlement between the parties of all civil cases had been agreed upon, pending judicial review.

In December 2021, Mark Zuckerberg purchased 110 acres surrounding Ka Loko reservoir. He stated his attention to fulfill the legal requirements for the property.

== External links and references ==
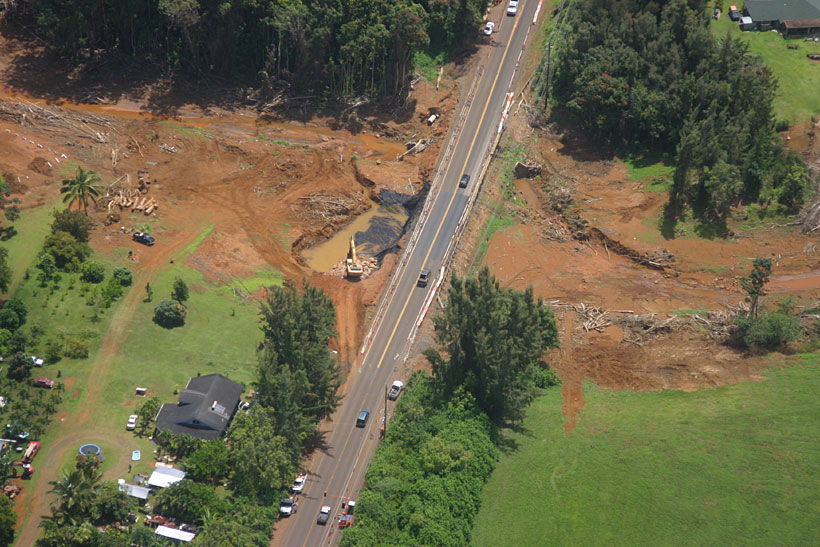
Aerial view of the highway damage caused by rushing flood waters

- Zimmerman, Malia (March 16, 2006). "'Tsunami' from the Mountain Crashes Through Kauaʻi Town". Hawaii Reporter. Archived from the original on April 28, 2006.
- Borreca, Richard; Finnegan, Tom (March 15, 2006). "Crisis on Kauaʻi". Honolulu Star-Bulletin.
- Finnegan, Tom (March 15, 2006). "Pflueger had started work on dam that broke". Honolulu Star-Bulletin.
- "Update from Kauaʻi - Third Body Found in After Kaloko Dam Burst". Kauaʻi County Government. March 17, 2006. Archived from the original on September 3, 2006 – via Hawaii Reporter.
