= Lists of diplomatic missions =

This is a list of lists of diplomatic missions, sorted by receiving and sending country.

== Lists by received country ==
=== Africa ===
- List of diplomatic missions in Algeria
- List of diplomatic missions in Angola
- List of diplomatic missions in Benin
- List of diplomatic missions in Botswana
- List of diplomatic missions in Burkina Faso
- List of diplomatic missions in Burundi
- List of diplomatic missions in Cameroon
- List of diplomatic missions in Cape Verde
- List of diplomatic missions in the Central African Republic
- List of diplomatic missions in Chad
- List of diplomatic missions in Comoros
- List of diplomatic missions in the DR Congo
- List of diplomatic missions in the Republic of the Congo
- List of diplomatic missions in Djibouti
- List of diplomatic missions in Egypt
- List of diplomatic missions in Equatorial Guinea
- List of diplomatic missions in Eritrea
- List of diplomatic missions in Eswatini
- List of diplomatic missions in Ethiopia
- List of diplomatic missions in Gabon
- List of diplomatic missions in the Gambia
- List of diplomatic missions in Ghana
- List of diplomatic missions in Guinea
- List of diplomatic missions in Guinea-Bissau
- List of diplomatic missions in Ivory Coast
- List of diplomatic missions in Kenya
- List of diplomatic missions in Lesotho
- List of diplomatic missions in Liberia
- List of diplomatic missions in Libya
- List of diplomatic missions in Madagascar
- List of diplomatic missions in Malawi
- List of diplomatic missions in Mali
- List of diplomatic missions in Mauritania
- List of diplomatic missions in Mauritius
- List of diplomatic missions in Morocco
- List of diplomatic missions in Mozambique
- List of diplomatic missions in Namibia
- List of diplomatic missions in Niger
- List of diplomatic missions in Nigeria
- List of diplomatic missions in Rwanda
- List of diplomatic missions in São Tomé and Príncipe
- List of diplomatic missions in Senegal
- List of diplomatic missions in Seychelles
- List of diplomatic missions in Sierra Leone
- List of diplomatic missions in Somalia
- List of diplomatic missions in South Africa
- List of diplomatic missions in South Sudan
- List of diplomatic missions in Sudan
- List of diplomatic missions in Tanzania
- List of diplomatic missions in Togo
- List of diplomatic missions in Tunisia
- List of diplomatic missions in Uganda
- List of diplomatic missions in Zambia
- List of diplomatic missions in Zimbabwe

==== Limited recognition ====
- List of diplomatic missions in the Sahrawi Arab Democratic Republic
- List of diplomatic missions in Somaliland

=== Americas ===
- List of diplomatic missions in Antigua and Barbuda
- List of diplomatic missions in Argentina
- List of diplomatic missions in The Bahamas
- List of diplomatic missions in Barbados
- List of diplomatic missions in Belize
- List of diplomatic missions in Bolivia
- List of diplomatic missions in Brazil
- List of diplomatic missions in Canada
- List of diplomatic missions in Chile
- List of diplomatic missions in Colombia
- List of diplomatic missions in Costa Rica
- List of diplomatic missions in Cuba
- List of diplomatic missions in Dominica
- List of diplomatic missions in the Dominican Republic
- List of diplomatic missions in Ecuador
- List of diplomatic missions in El Salvador
- List of diplomatic missions in Grenada
- List of diplomatic missions in Guatemala
- List of diplomatic missions in Guyana
- List of diplomatic missions in Haiti
- List of diplomatic missions in Honduras
- List of diplomatic missions in Jamaica
- List of diplomatic missions in Mexico
- List of diplomatic missions in Nicaragua
- List of diplomatic missions in Panama
- List of diplomatic missions in Paraguay
- List of diplomatic missions in Peru
- List of diplomatic missions in Saint Kitts and Nevis
- List of diplomatic missions in Saint Lucia
- List of diplomatic missions in Saint Vincent and the Grenadines
- List of diplomatic missions in Suriname
- List of diplomatic missions in Trinidad and Tobago
- List of diplomatic missions in the United States
- List of diplomatic missions in Uruguay
- List of diplomatic missions in Venezuela

==== Dependencies and other territories ====
- List of diplomatic missions in Greenland

=== Asia ===
- List of diplomatic missions in Afghanistan
- List of diplomatic missions in Armenia
- List of diplomatic missions in Azerbaijan
- List of diplomatic missions in Bahrain
- List of diplomatic missions in Bangladesh
- List of diplomatic missions in Bhutan
- List of diplomatic missions in Brunei
- List of diplomatic missions in Cambodia
- List of diplomatic missions in China
- List of diplomatic missions in Cyprus
- List of diplomatic missions in East Timor
- List of diplomatic missions in Egypt
- List of diplomatic missions in Georgia (country)
- List of diplomatic missions in India
- List of diplomatic missions in Indonesia
- List of diplomatic missions in Iran
- List of diplomatic missions in Iraq
- List of diplomatic missions in Israel
- List of diplomatic missions in Japan
- List of diplomatic missions in Jordan
- List of diplomatic missions in Kazakhstan
- List of diplomatic missions in North Korea
- List of diplomatic missions in South Korea
- List of diplomatic missions in Kuwait
- List of diplomatic missions in Kyrgyzstan
- List of diplomatic missions in Laos
- List of diplomatic missions in Lebanon
- List of diplomatic missions in Malaysia
- List of diplomatic missions in the Maldives
- List of diplomatic missions in Mongolia
- List of diplomatic missions in Myanmar
- List of diplomatic missions in Nepal
- List of diplomatic missions in Oman
- List of diplomatic missions in Pakistan
- List of diplomatic missions in the Philippines
- List of diplomatic missions in Qatar
- List of diplomatic missions in Russia
- List of diplomatic missions in Saudi Arabia
- List of diplomatic missions in Singapore
- List of diplomatic missions in Sri Lanka
- List of diplomatic missions in Syria
- List of diplomatic missions in Tajikistan
- List of diplomatic missions in Thailand
- List of diplomatic missions in Turkey
- List of diplomatic missions in Turkmenistan
- List of diplomatic missions in the United Arab Emirates
- List of diplomatic missions in Uzbekistan
- List of diplomatic missions in Vietnam
- List of diplomatic missions in Yemen

==== Limited recognition ====
- List of diplomatic missions in Abkhazia
- List of diplomatic missions in Northern Cyprus
- List of diplomatic missions in Palestine
- List of diplomatic missions in South Ossetia
- List of diplomatic missions in Taiwan

==== Dependencies and other territories ====
- List of diplomatic missions in Hong Kong
- List of diplomatic missions in Kurdistan Region
- List of diplomatic missions in Macau

=== Europe ===
- List of diplomatic missions in Albania
- List of diplomatic missions in Andorra
- List of diplomatic missions in Armenia
- List of diplomatic missions in Austria
- List of diplomatic missions in Azerbaijan
- List of diplomatic missions in Belarus
- List of diplomatic missions in Belgium
- List of diplomatic missions in Bosnia and Herzegovina
- List of diplomatic missions in Bulgaria
- List of diplomatic missions in Croatia
- List of diplomatic missions in Cyprus
- List of diplomatic missions in the Czech Republic
- List of diplomatic missions in Denmark
- List of diplomatic missions in Estonia
- List of diplomatic missions in Finland
- List of diplomatic missions in France
- List of diplomatic missions in Georgia (country)
- List of diplomatic missions in Germany
- List of diplomatic missions in Greece
- List of diplomatic missions in Hungary
- List of diplomatic missions in Iceland
- List of diplomatic missions in Ireland
- List of diplomatic missions in Italy
- List of diplomatic missions in Kazakhstan
- List of diplomatic missions in Latvia
- List of diplomatic missions in Liechtenstein
- List of diplomatic missions in Lithuania
- List of diplomatic missions in Luxembourg
- List of diplomatic missions in Malta
- List of diplomatic missions in Moldova
- List of diplomatic missions in Monaco
- List of diplomatic missions in Montenegro
- List of diplomatic missions in the Netherlands
- List of diplomatic missions in North Macedonia
- List of diplomatic missions in Norway
- List of diplomatic missions in Poland
- List of diplomatic missions in Portugal
- List of diplomatic missions in Romania
- List of diplomatic missions in Russia
- List of diplomatic missions in San Marino
- List of diplomatic missions in Serbia
- List of diplomatic missions in Slovakia
- List of diplomatic missions in Slovenia
- List of diplomatic missions in Spain
- List of diplomatic missions in Sweden
- List of diplomatic missions in Switzerland
- List of diplomatic missions in Turkey
- List of diplomatic missions in Ukraine
- List of diplomatic missions in the United Kingdom
- List of diplomatic missions in Vatican City

==== Limited recognition ====
- List of diplomatic missions in Abkhazia
- List of diplomatic missions in Kosovo
- List of diplomatic missions in Northern Cyprus
- List of diplomatic missions in South Ossetia
- List of diplomatic missions in Transnistria

==== Other entities ====
- List of diplomatic missions to the Sovereign Military Order of Malta

=== Oceania ===
- List of diplomatic missions in Australia
- List of diplomatic missions in the Federated States of Micronesia
- List of diplomatic missions in Fiji
- List of diplomatic missions in Kiribati
- List of diplomatic missions in the Marshall Islands
- List of diplomatic missions in Nauru
- List of diplomatic missions in New Zealand
- List of diplomatic missions in Palau
- List of diplomatic missions in Papua New Guinea
- List of diplomatic missions in Samoa
- List of diplomatic missions in Solomon Islands
- List of diplomatic missions in Tonga
- List of diplomatic missions in Tuvalu
- List of diplomatic missions in Vanuatu

==== Associated states of New Zealand ====
- List of diplomatic missions in the Cook Islands
- List of diplomatic missions in Niue

== Lists by sending country ==
=== Africa ===
- List of diplomatic missions of Algeria
- List of diplomatic missions of Angola
- List of diplomatic missions of Benin
- List of diplomatic missions of Botswana
- List of diplomatic missions of Burkina Faso
- List of diplomatic missions of Burundi
- List of diplomatic missions of Cameroon
- List of diplomatic missions of Cape Verde
- List of diplomatic missions of the Central African Republic
- List of diplomatic missions of Chad
- List of diplomatic missions of Comoros
- List of diplomatic missions in the DR Congo
- List of diplomatic missions of the Republic of the Congo
- List of diplomatic missions of Djibouti
- List of diplomatic missions of Egypt
- List of diplomatic missions of Equatorial Guinea
- List of diplomatic missions of Eritrea
- List of diplomatic missions of Eswatini
- List of diplomatic missions of Ethiopia
- List of diplomatic missions of Gabon
- List of diplomatic missions of the Gambia
- List of diplomatic missions of Ghana
- List of diplomatic missions of Guinea
- List of diplomatic missions of Guinea-Bissau
- List of diplomatic missions of Ivory Coast
- List of diplomatic missions of Kenya
- List of diplomatic missions of Lesotho
- List of diplomatic missions of Liberia
- List of diplomatic missions of Libya
- List of diplomatic missions of Madagascar
- List of diplomatic missions of Malawi
- List of diplomatic missions of Mali
- List of diplomatic missions of Mauritania
- List of diplomatic missions of Mauritius
- List of diplomatic missions of Morocco
- List of diplomatic missions of Mozambique
- List of diplomatic missions of Namibia
- List of diplomatic missions of Niger
- List of diplomatic missions of Nigeria
- List of diplomatic missions of Rwanda
- List of diplomatic missions of São Tomé and Príncipe
- List of diplomatic missions of Senegal
- List of diplomatic missions of Seychelles
- List of diplomatic missions of Sierra Leone
- List of diplomatic missions of Somalia
- List of diplomatic missions of South Africa
- List of diplomatic missions of South Sudan
- List of diplomatic missions of Sudan
- List of diplomatic missions of Tanzania
- List of diplomatic missions of Togo
- List of diplomatic missions of Tunisia
- List of diplomatic missions of Uganda
- List of diplomatic missions of Zambia
- List of diplomatic missions of Zimbabwe

==== Limited recognition ====
- List of diplomatic missions of the Sahrawi Arab Democratic Republic
- List of representative offices of Somaliland

=== Americas ===
- List of diplomatic missions of Antigua and Barbuda
- List of diplomatic missions of Argentina
- List of diplomatic missions of the Bahamas
- List of diplomatic missions of Barbados
- List of diplomatic missions of Belize
- List of diplomatic missions of Bolivia
- List of diplomatic missions of Brazil
- List of diplomatic missions of Canada
- List of diplomatic missions of Chile
- List of diplomatic missions of Colombia
- List of diplomatic missions of Costa Rica
- List of diplomatic missions of Cuba
- List of diplomatic missions of Dominica
- List of diplomatic missions of the Dominican Republic
- List of diplomatic missions of Ecuador
- List of diplomatic missions of El Salvador
- List of diplomatic missions of Grenada
- List of diplomatic missions of Guatemala
- List of diplomatic missions of Guyana
- List of diplomatic missions of Haiti
- List of diplomatic missions of Honduras
- List of diplomatic missions of Jamaica
- List of diplomatic missions of Mexico
- List of diplomatic missions of Nicaragua
- List of diplomatic missions of Panama
- List of diplomatic missions of Paraguay
- List of diplomatic missions of Peru
- List of diplomatic missions of Saint Kitts and Nevis
- List of diplomatic missions of Saint Lucia
- List of diplomatic missions of Saint Vincent and the Grenadines
- List of diplomatic missions of Suriname
- List of diplomatic missions of Trinidad and Tobago
- List of diplomatic missions of the United States
- List of diplomatic missions of Uruguay
- List of diplomatic missions of Venezuela

==== Dependencies and other territories ====
- Diplomatic representations of Greenland

=== Asia ===
- List of diplomatic missions of Afghanistan
- List of diplomatic missions of Armenia
- List of diplomatic missions of Azerbaijan
- List of diplomatic missions of Bahrain
- List of diplomatic missions of Bangladesh
- List of diplomatic missions of Bhutan
- List of diplomatic missions of Brunei
- List of diplomatic missions of Cambodia
- List of diplomatic missions of China
- List of diplomatic missions of Cyprus
- List of diplomatic missions of East Timor
- List of diplomatic missions of Egypt
- List of diplomatic missions of Georgia (country)
- List of diplomatic missions of India
- List of diplomatic missions of Indonesia
- List of diplomatic missions of Iran
- List of diplomatic missions of Iraq
- List of diplomatic missions of Israel
- List of diplomatic missions of Japan
- List of diplomatic missions of Jordan
- List of diplomatic missions of Kazakhstan
- List of diplomatic missions of North Korea
- List of diplomatic missions of South Korea
- List of diplomatic missions of Kuwait
- List of diplomatic missions of Kyrgyzstan
- List of diplomatic missions of Laos
- List of diplomatic missions of Lebanon
- List of diplomatic missions of Malaysia
- List of diplomatic missions of the Maldives
- List of diplomatic missions of Mongolia
- List of diplomatic missions of Myanmar
- List of diplomatic missions of Nepal
- List of diplomatic missions of Oman
- List of diplomatic missions of Pakistan
- List of diplomatic missions of the Philippines
- List of diplomatic missions of Qatar
- List of diplomatic missions of Russia
- List of diplomatic missions of Saudi Arabia
- List of diplomatic missions of Singapore
- List of diplomatic missions of Sri Lanka
- List of diplomatic missions of Syria
- List of diplomatic missions of Tajikistan
- List of diplomatic missions of Thailand
- List of diplomatic missions of Turkey
- List of diplomatic missions of Turkmenistan
- List of diplomatic missions of the United Arab Emirates
- List of diplomatic missions of Uzbekistan
- List of diplomatic missions of Vietnam
- List of diplomatic missions of Yemen

==== Limited recognition ====
- List of diplomatic missions of Abkhazia
- List of diplomatic missions of Northern Cyprus
- List of diplomatic missions of Palestine
- List of diplomatic missions of South Ossetia
- List of diplomatic missions of Taiwan

==== Dependencies and other territories ====
- List of diplomatic missions of Hong Kong
- List of diplomatic missions of Kurdistan Region
- List of diplomatic missions of Macau

=== Europe ===
- List of diplomatic missions of Albania
- List of diplomatic missions of Andorra
- List of diplomatic missions of Armenia
- List of diplomatic missions of Austria
- List of diplomatic missions of Azerbaijan
- List of diplomatic missions of Belarus
- List of diplomatic missions of Belgium
- List of diplomatic missions of Bosnia and Herzegovina
- List of diplomatic missions of Bulgaria
- List of diplomatic missions of Croatia
- List of diplomatic missions of Cyprus
- List of diplomatic missions of the Czech Republic
- List of diplomatic missions of Denmark
- List of diplomatic missions of Estonia
- List of diplomatic missions of Finland
- List of diplomatic missions of France
- List of diplomatic missions of Georgia (country)
- List of diplomatic missions of Germany
- List of diplomatic missions of Greece
- List of diplomatic missions of Hungary
- List of diplomatic missions of Iceland
- List of diplomatic missions of Ireland
- List of diplomatic missions of Italy
- List of diplomatic missions of Kazakhstan
- List of diplomatic missions of Latvia
- List of diplomatic missions of Liechtenstein
- List of diplomatic missions of Lithuania
- List of diplomatic missions of Luxembourg
- List of diplomatic missions of Malta
- List of diplomatic missions of Moldova
- List of diplomatic missions of Monaco
- List of diplomatic missions of Montenegro
- List of diplomatic missions of the Netherlands
- List of diplomatic missions of North Macedonia
- List of diplomatic missions of Norway
- List of diplomatic missions of Poland
- List of diplomatic missions of Portugal
- List of diplomatic missions of Romania
- List of diplomatic missions of Russia
- List of diplomatic missions of San Marino
- List of diplomatic missions of Serbia
- List of diplomatic missions of Slovakia
- List of diplomatic missions of Slovenia
- List of diplomatic missions of Spain
- List of diplomatic missions of Sweden
- List of diplomatic missions of Switzerland
- List of diplomatic missions of Turkey
- List of diplomatic missions of Ukraine
- List of diplomatic missions of the United Kingdom
- List of diplomatic missions of Vatican City

==== Limited recognition ====
- List of diplomatic missions of Abkhazia
- List of diplomatic missions of Kosovo
- List of diplomatic missions of Northern Cyprus
- List of diplomatic missions of South Ossetia
- List of diplomatic missions of Transnistria

==== Other entities ====
- List of diplomatic missions of the Sovereign Military Order of Malta
- Diplomatic missions of the European Union

=== Oceania ===
- List of diplomatic missions of Australia
- List of diplomatic missions of the Federated States of Micronesia
- List of diplomatic missions of Fiji
- List of diplomatic missions of Kiribati
- List of diplomatic missions of the Marshall Islands
- List of diplomatic missions of Nauru
- List of diplomatic missions of New Zealand
- List of diplomatic missions of Palau
- List of diplomatic missions of Papua New Guinea
- List of diplomatic missions of Samoa
- List of diplomatic missions of Solomon Islands
- List of diplomatic missions of Tonga
- List of diplomatic missions of Tuvalu
- List of diplomatic missions of Vanuatu

==== Associated states of New Zealand ====
- List of diplomatic missions of the Cook Islands
- List of diplomatic missions of Niue
