= Israel–Micronesia relations =

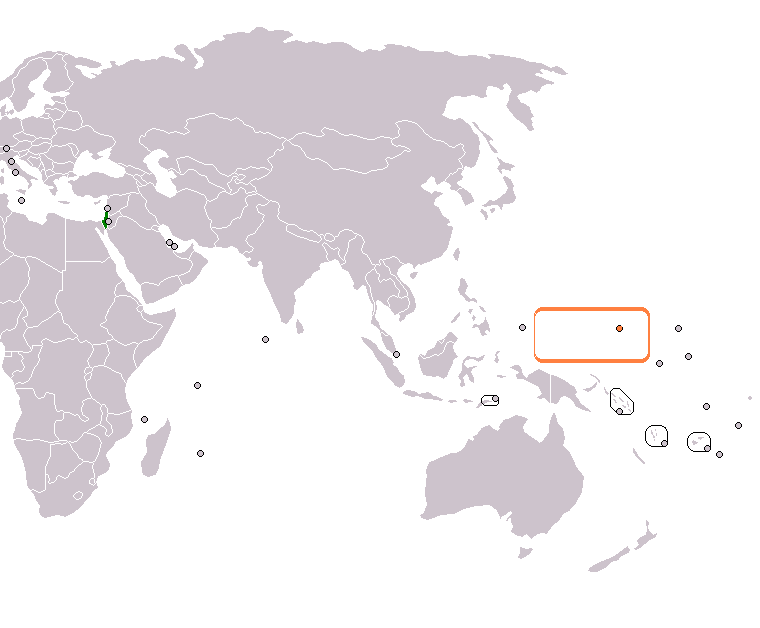

- Israel: Federated States of Micronesia

Israel—Micronesia relations are diplomatic and other relations between the State of Israel and the Federated States of Micronesia. Israel was among the first countries to establish formal diplomatic relations with Micronesia.

== History ==
Asterio Takesy, Micronesia's Ambassador to the United States and Israel, said: "Israel was one of the first countries that welcomed us — extended a friendly hand of welcoming us into the world community even before we joined the United Nations and before we became independent."

Micronesia is a close voting ally of Israel at the United Nations and other international organizations, particularly on the resolutions that are critical of Israel. According to the FSM government, the support is owing in part to its Judeo-Christian tradition. Additional reasons for the close bilateral relations include economic interests, with Israel providing aid to the FSM in areas such as agriculture, technical training, and health care training.

In 2000, during a State visit to Israel by Micronesian President Leo A. Falcam, the two countries signed a "Protocol on Cooperation" to "give expression to the warm relations between the two states, and Israel's appreciation of the unreserved support it receives from Micronesia in the UN". In 2010, Micronesian President Emanuel Mori conducted another State visit to Israel. Greeting him, Israeli President Shimon Peres described Micronesia as "one of Israel's greatest friends". Mori explained to his counterpart "the vulnerability of Pacific islands to the impacts of climate change". That same year, Peres thanked (non-resident) Micronesian Ambassador Yosiwo P. George for "his country's enduring friendship and 'outstanding' support": "I don't know the size of your country, but I know the size of your friendship." Ambassador George replied that Micronesia and Israel shared "values and interests". He asked Israel for technical and economic assistance, as well as medical training programs, which Peres promised to supply. Israel also supplies Micronesia with experts on citrus crops and irrigation techniques, medical technicians, and scholarships to Israeli colleges.

Micronesia is a former United Nations Trust Territory administered by the United States. It became sovereign in 1986 through a Compact of Free Association, which establishes mutual economic and defence responsibilities between the two countries. The Marshall Islands and Palau – the other two countries which consistently support Israel at the United Nations – are also former U.S. territories bound by the Compact.

== Examples of votes in the UN ==
- On July 7, 1998, the General Assembly adopted Resolution 52/250, granting Palestine "additional rights and privileges of participation in the sessions and work of the General Assembly". The resolution was adopted by 124 votes to 4, with 10 abstentions. The countries which voted against were the Federated States of Micronesia, Israel, the Marshall Islands and the United States.
- On 17 May 2004, the General Assembly adopted Resolution 58/292, affirming the military occupation of the OPT and the need for a sovereign and independent Palestinian State. The resolution was adopted by 140 votes to 6, with 11 abstentions. The countries which voted against were Federated States of Micronesia, Israel, Marshall Islands, Nauru, Palau and the United States.
- On July 20, 2004, the General Assembly Plenary Tenth Emergency Special Session “voted overwhelmingly to demand that Israel heed [the] advisory opinion of the International Court of Justice (ICJ) to halt construction on its security barrier in the West Bank, tear down the portions built on Palestinian land, and provide reparations to Palestinians whose lives have been harmed by the wall”. The Assembly adopted the motion by 150 votes in favour to 6 against, with 10 abstentions. Those voting against were Australia, the Federated States of Micronesia, Israel, the Marshall Islands, Palau and the United States.
- On December 18, 2009, the General Assembly adopted a resolution “reaffirm(ing) the right of the Palestinian people to self-determination, including the right to their independent State of Palestine”, by 171 votes to 6. Those voting against were the Federated States of Micronesia, Israel, the Marshall Islands, Nauru, Palau and the United States. It was one of a series of such resolutions in December 2009, on which Micronesia consistently cast one of the few dissenting votes.
- In December 2017, Micronesia was one of just nine countries (including the United States and Israel) to vote against a motion adopted by the United Nations General Assembly condemning the United States' recognition of Jerusalem as the capital of Israel.
- In December 2023, Micronesia was one of just 10 countries (including the United States and Israel) to vote against a motion adopted by the United Nations General Assembly calling for a ceasefire in the Gaza war.

== See also ==
- Foreign relations of Israel
- Foreign relations of the Federated States of Micronesia
- International recognition of Israel
- Israel–Marshall Islands relations
- Israel–Nauru relations
- Israel–Palau relations
