= Israel–Nauru relations =

- Israel: Nauru

Israel–Nauru relations are diplomatic and other relations between Israel and Nauru. Israel has a non-resident ambassador in Jerusalem and honorary consulate (Yaren), while Nauru has an embassy in Jerusalem and honorary consulate (Rosh HaAyin).

Both countries have been described as holding a close relationship with each other. Nauru's voting record at the United Nations has been characterized as "longstanding support" for Israel.

== History ==
In 2010 the President of Nauru, Marcus Stephen and Minister of Foreign Affairs and Trade of Nauru, Kieren Keke, along with Nauru's ambassador to the United Nations, Marlene Moses visited Israel, and at that meeting President Stephen expressed unqualified support for Israel.

During the visit, which included a tour of the Golan Heights, President Stephen and his Micronesian counterpart, Emanuel Mori planted a tree on Mount Herzl honor of diplomatic relations.

In early December 2017, Israeli Prime Minister Benjamin Netanyahu donated $72,000 to Nauru's wastewater treatment plant. Two weeks later, Nauru voted against a United Nations General Assembly resolution which declared the status of Jerusalem as Israel's capital as "null and void". Earlier that year, Deputy Foreign Minister Tzipi Hotovely had met with Baron Waqa in a conference.

On 29 August 2019, Nauru officially recognized Jerusalem as the state capital of Israel. Palestinian representative Hanan Ashrawi released a statement "unequivocally condemn[ing]" Nauru's decision, while Israeli foreign minister Israel Katz praised the country's decision in addition to Israeli diplomat Yuval Rotem.

In November 2021, Nauru was one of seven nations to vote in favour of Israel at a United Nations resolution. The next month Nauru backed Israel in another resolution again.

Benjamin Netanyahu's son Avner Netanyahu has visited Nauru, which possesses one of the lowest rates of tourism in the world. Israeli aid agency Mashav distributed 20 scholarships to Nauru in 2017, in addition to medical supplies and training.

Following the October 7 attacks, Nauru condemned Hamas, supporting Israel's right to defend itself. The same month, Nauru joined the minority in the United Nations alongside twelve other member states, voting against an immediate ceasefire in Gaza. In November 2023, Nauru again voted with the minority, alongside six other member states, against a resolution condemning Israeli settlement activity in the Palestinian territories. Again in December 2023, Nauru voted against an immediate ceasefire along with the US and seven additional countries.

On 7 September 2026, Nauru opened an embassy to Israel in Jerusalem, becoming the ninth country to open or move its embassy to Jerusalem.

== See also ==
- International recognition of Israel
- Israel–Marshall Islands relations
- Israel–Federated States of Micronesia relations
- Israel–Palau relations
