= Australia–Marshall Islands relations =

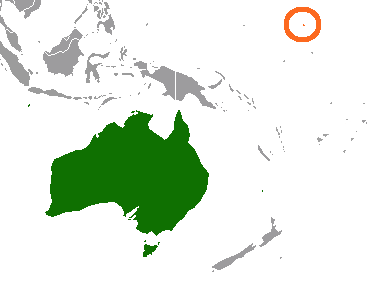

- Australia: Marshall Islands

Australia–Marshall Islands relations are the bilateral relations between Australia and the Marshall Islands. The Marshall Islands are located approximately halfway between Australia and Hawaii. The two countries are members of the Pacific Islands Forum and the Pacific Community.

== History ==
Early exchanges between Australia and the Marshall Islands occurred in the 1870s, when Australian traders visited it as part of the Micronesian copra boom. During this period, Australian traders gave the Marshallese items such as rifles, flintlock muskets and revolvers in exchange for copra.

Australia was the second country, after the United States, to establish diplomatic relations with the Marshall Islands following its independence. From 1989 to 2021, Australia was accredited to the Marshall Islands from its embassy in Pohnpei, Micronesia. Australia opened a resident embassy in the Marshall Islands' capital Majuro in May 2021. The Marshall Islands is accredited to Australia from its embassy in Suva, Fiji.

In July 2025, Australian Climate Change Minister Chris Bowen visited Majuro, holding discussions over a range of topics, including the ongoing climate change agenda and a new renewable energy partnership between the Marshall Islands and Australia. In November of that year, the renewable energy deal with Australia was officially signed by Marshall Islands Environment Minister Bremity Lakjohn.

On February 2, 2026, Marshall Islands President Hilda Heine met with Australian Prime Minister Anthony Albanese during an official visit to Canberra. It was the first visit by a Marshallese president to Australia since 1993, and the discussions between Heine and Albanese focused on climate action and shared regional priorities.

== Aid ==
Australia is a donor of aid to the Marshall Islands and the North Pacific subregion of Oceania. Australia's aid program in the North Pacific is focused on the Federated States of Micronesia (FSM), the Republic of Palau and the Marshall Islands. In the Marshall Islands it has helped in securing water supplies and sanitation services, and improving social and economic opportunities for women and girls. Between 2012 and 2016, the Australian government claims to have educated 8,500 children in the Marshall Islands and Micronesia about climate change mitigation and disaster risk management. The Australian government provided an estimated $8.4 million in total Official Development Assistance (ODA) to the North Pacific in 2019-20.

In the late 1990s and early 2000s, Australia had a roughly $1 million development program named "Plant Protection in Micronesia". The project supported the Federated States of Micronesia, the Marshall Islands and Palau to strengthen plant protection and quarantine systems and prevent the introduction of pests. Australia's funding supported staffing, training, equipment, travel and operational costs. The project helped protect agricultural and forestry resources and supported local and regional food production. In 2021, the governments of Australia and Japan decided to fund two major law enforcement developments in the Marshall Islands.

== See also ==
- Foreign relations of the Marshall Islands
- Foreign relations of Australia
