= Foreign relations of the Federated States of Micronesia =

The government of the Federated States of Micronesia (FSM) conducts its own foreign relations. Since independence in 1986, the FSM has established diplomatic relations with 92 countries, including all of its Pacific neighbors.

== Regional relations ==
Regional cooperation through various multilateral organizations is a key element in FSM's foreign policy. FSM is a full member of the Pacific Islands Forum, the South Pacific Applied Geoscience Commission, the Pacific Regional Environment Programme and the Secretariat of the Pacific Community. The country also is one of the eight signatories of the Nauru Agreement Concerning Cooperation In The Management Of Fisheries Of Common Interest which collectively controls 25-30% of the world's tuna supply and approximately 60% of the western and central Pacific tuna supply.

== Diplomatic relations ==
List of countries which the Federated States of Micronesia maintains diplomatic relations with:

#	Country	Date
1	United States	3 November 1986
2	Marshall Islands	26 February 1987
3	Nauru	10 April 1987
4	Tuvalu	3 March 1988
5	New Zealand	30 June 1988
6	Australia	6 July 1988
7	Fiji	5 August 1988
8	Japan	5 August 1988
9	Papua New Guinea	21 September 1988
10	Israel	23 November 1988
11	Kiribati	9 December 1988
12	Philippines	10 January 1989
13	Tonga	1 August 1989
14	China	11 September 1989
15	Samoa	13 March 1990
16	Chile	31 March 1990
17	Solomon Islands	5 April 1990
18	Vanuatu	19 April 1990
19	South Korea	5 April 1991
20	Indonesia	16 July 1991
21	Singapore	26 August 1991
22	Maldives	24 October 1991
23	Brunei	23 February 1992
24	Thailand	20 March 1992
25	Germany	21 April 1992
26	Cyprus	5 May 1992
27	Peru	7 May 1992
28	Spain	11 May 1992
29	Austria	1 July 1992
30	Malaysia	6 July 1992
31	Sweden	17 August 1992
32	United Kingdom	31 August 1992
33	Colombia	8 September 1992
34	Italy	27 November 1992
35	France	5 February 1993
36	Guatemala	13 March 1993
37	Argentina	27 July 1993
–	Holy See	27 January 1994
38	Palau	1 October 1994
39	Portugal	24 March 1995
40	Cambodia	2 May 1995
41	Vietnam	22 September 1995
42	Netherlands	15 April 1996
43	Greece	30 April 1996
44	Belgium	28 October 1996
45	India	29 November 1996
46	South Africa	12 December 1996
–	Sovereign Order of Malta	12 November 1997
47	Canada	3 March 1998
–	Russia (severed)	9 March 1999
48	Ukraine	17 September 1999
49	Croatia	30 September 1999
50	Mexico	27 September 2001
51	Switzerland	22 April 2003
52	Iceland	27 September 2004
53	Czech Republic	6 October 2004
54	Ireland	27 October 2004
55	North Macedonia	30 November 2004
56	Slovakia	13 September 2006
57	Estonia	22 September 2006
58	Turkey	6 December 2006
59	Dominican Republic	5 October 2007
60	Luxembourg	24 April 2008
61	Finland	3 May 2010
62	Egypt	25 September 2010
63	Morocco	13 October 2010
64	Brazil	25 October 2010
65	Slovenia	29 March 2011
66	Georgia	12 August 2011
67	Hungary	7 September 2011
68	Uruguay	5 September 2013
69	Montenegro	10 September 2013
–	Kosovo	17 September 2013
70	Lithuania	4 November 2013
71	Mongolia	6 December 2013
–	Cook Islands	24 September 2014
72	Latvia	25 February 2015
73	Poland	6 March 2015
74	Cuba	9 September 2015
75	Kazakhstan	27 October 2015
76	Kuwait	2 September 2016
77	United Arab Emirates	14 September 2016
78	Armenia	21 September 2017
79	Mauritius	10 October 2017
80	Paraguay	11 October 2017
81	Tajikistan	29 January 2018
82	Norway	12 April 2018
83	Denmark	29 August 2018
84	Malta	25 September 2018
85	San Marino	25 September 2018
86	Kyrgyzstan	30 October 2018
87	Romania	5 February 2019
88	Nicaragua	11 December 2019
89	Panama	20 September 2022
90	Bahrain	21 September 2022
91	Bulgaria	20 October 2022
92	Bosnia and Herzegovina	19 April 2023
93	Saudi Arabia	7 November 2023
94	Monaco	17 July 2025
95	Benin	14 August 2025
96	Pakistan	14 August 2025
97	Moldova	2 April 2026
98	Azerbaijan	1 June 2026
99	Qatar	8 June 2026
100	Timor-Leste	24 June 2026
101	Seychelles	19 August 2026
102	Nepal	14 September 2026

== Bilateral relations ==
The FSM maintains permanent embassies in four nations: China, Fiji, Japan and the United States. The FSM also maintains a resident consulate in Hawaii, Portland, Oregon and Guam. The FSM maintains non-resident embassies for four nations: Indonesia, Malaysia and Singapore (all in Japan) and Israel in Fiji. Four nations maintain permanent embassies in the FSM: Australia, China, Japan and the United States. Additionally, 15 nations maintain non-resident embassies with the FSM. France and the United Kingdom have non-resident embassies for the FSM in Fiji. Canada, Italy and South Africa have non-resident embassies for the FSM in Australia. Indonesia has a non-resident embassy for the FSM in Japan. Chile has its non-resident embassies for the FSM in the United States. Croatia has its non-resident embassy for the FSM in Indonesia. Czech Republic, Finland, the Netherlands, Portugal, Spain, and Switzerland have non-resident embassies in the Philippines. New Zealand has its non-resident embassy for the FSM in Kiribati.

=== Americas ===
Country	Formal Relations Began	Notes
Cuba	9 September 2015	Micronesia was one of ten Pacific countries to send a government member to the first Cuba-Pacific Islands ministerial meeting, held in Havana in September 2008. The aim of the meeting was to "strengthen cooperation" between Micronesia and Cuba, notably on addressing the impact of climate change.
Mexico	27 September 2001	Mexico is accredited to Micronesia from its embassy in Manila, Philippines.; Micronesia does not have an accreditation to Mexico.
United States	3 November 1986	See Micronesia-United States relations The Governments of the FSM and the U.S. signed the final version of the Compact of Free Association on October 1, 1982. The Compact went into effect on November 3, 1986, and the FSM became a sovereign nation in free association with the United States. Under the Compact, the U.S. has full authority and responsibility for the defense of the FSM. This security relationship can be changed or terminated by mutual agreement. The Compact provides U.S. grant funds and federal program assistance to the FSM. The basic relationship of free association continues indefinitely, but certain economic and defense provisions of the Compact expire in 2001, subject to renegotiation. Negotiations on extending the Compact began in November 1999. The United States is the FSM's largest trading partner. The relationship is heavily imbalanced. Of the FSM-US total balance of trade in goods in 2010 of US$38.3 million, the FSM imported $42.5 million in goods from the United States while exporting only US$4.2 million to the United States. (see Economy of the Federated States of Micronesia).: Micronesia has an embassy in Washington, D.C., and consulates-general in Honolulu and Tamuning (Guam).; United States has an embassy in Kolonia.

=== Asia ===
Country	Formal Relations Began	Note
China	11 September 1989	Main article: China–Federated States of Micronesia relations The People's Republic of China has close relations with the FSM in terms of both trade and foreign aid. Chinese aid projects have included among others the Giant Clam Farm Project in Kosrae, the Pilot Farm Project in Madolenihmw, the construction of a gymnasium on Pohnpei (officially named the FSM-China Friendship Sports Center), donation of police vehicles for the Yap state police, a facility to house the FSM's Tuna Commission, an expansion of the Chuuk State Airport Terminal, a biogas project on Chuuk, the construction of the Pohnpei Administration Building, and the construction of Kosrae High School Project. China is the FSM's third largest trade partner (after the United States and Japan), a fact marked by the rapid increase in trade between the two nations. As the Chinese Ambassador to the FSM Zhang Weidong observed on the 20th anniversary of relations between the two countries, trade between China and the FSM had gone from "almost zero to $9.5 million in 2007."
India	29 November 1996	See India–Federated States of Micronesia relations India and Micronesia have maintained diplomatic relations with each other since 1996. India gave 'Development assistance' to the country of about US$73,145 in 2009 for the purchase of machinery for the coconut industry. India also made a grant of 3 ITEC scholarships in 2010–11. As per the Ministry of External Affairs of the Government of India, "Micronesia has been supportive of issues of importance to India, particularly Indian candidatures to international organizations and supported India's candidature for the UNSC non-permanent seat in 2011–12. As per information available, there is one Indian family in Micronesia."
Israel	23 November 1988	See Israel–Federated States of Micronesia relations The FSM is one of the most consistent supporters of Israel (along with the United States) in international affairs. Throughout the history of the United Nations General Assembly, it is claimed by some there has always been an "automatic majority" against Israel. The United States has consistently opposed what it perceives as "unbalanced" "anti-Israel" resolutions and, in recent years, one other nation has joined Israel's defense — Micronesia. The foreign policy goals of the Federated States of Micronesia (FSM) are primarily linked to achieving economic development and protecting their vast marine environment. Israel was one of the first to welcome the FSM into the family of nations, even before the FSM became a member of the U.N. According to the FSM U.N. deputy ambassador, Micronesia has since sought close bilateral relations with Israel in areas such as agriculture, technical training and health care training. Israel has assisted the FSM in its early development. As one Micronesian diplomat said, "We need Israeli expertise, so I don't see a change in our policy anytime soon."
South Korea	5 April 1991	The Federated States of Micronesia and The Republic of Korea (South Korea) were established diplomatic relations in April 1991.
Turkey	6 December 2006	The Turkish ambassador in Canberra to Australia is also accredited to Micronesia.; Trade volume between the two countries was negligible in 2018.

=== Europe ===
Country	Formal Relations Began	Notes
Germany	21 April 1992	Micronesia is represented in Germany though its embassy in the United States.; Germany is represented in Germany through its embassy in the Philippines.
Kosovo	17 September 2013	The Federated States of Micronesia officially recognized the independence of the Republic of Kosovo on 5 December 2008. Kosovo and Micronesia established diplomatic relations on 19 September 2013.
Spain	11 May 1992	The islands of the FSM were once part of the Spanish East Indies.: The FSM does not have an accreditation to Spain.; Spain is accredited to the FSM from its embassy in Manila, Philippines.
United Kingdom	31 August 1992	See Foreign relations of the United Kingdom The Federated States of Micronesia established diplomatic relations with the United Kingdom on 31 August 1992.: Federated States of Micronesia does not maintain an embassy in the United Kingdom.; The United Kingdom is not accredited to the Federated States of Micronesia through an embassy; the UK develops relations through its high commission in Suva, Fiji.; Both countries share common membership of the United Nations, and the World Health Organization.

=== Oceania ===
Country	Formal Relations Began	Notes
Australia	6 July 1988	See Australia–Federated States of Micronesia relations
Marshall Islands	26 February 1987	See Marshall Islands–Federated States of Micronesia relations The Federated States of Micronesia and the Marshall Islands share very good relations, as they are both bound by Compacts of Free Association with the United States.
New Zealand	30 June 1988	FS of Micronesia does not have an accreditation to New Zealand.; New Zealand is accredited to the Federated States of Micronesia from its consulate-general in Honolulu, Hawaii, United States.
Palau	1 October 1994	See Federated States of Micronesia–Palau relations The Federated States of Micronesia and Palau share very good relations, as they are both bound by Compacts of Free Association with the United States.

== See also ==
- Compact of Free Association
- List of diplomatic missions in the Federated States of Micronesia
- List of diplomatic missions of the Federated States of Micronesia
- Trust Territory of the Pacific Islands
