= List of diplomatic missions of the Marshall Islands =

This is a list of diplomatic missions of the Marshall Islands. The Republic of the Marshall Islands maintains a small diplomatic network.

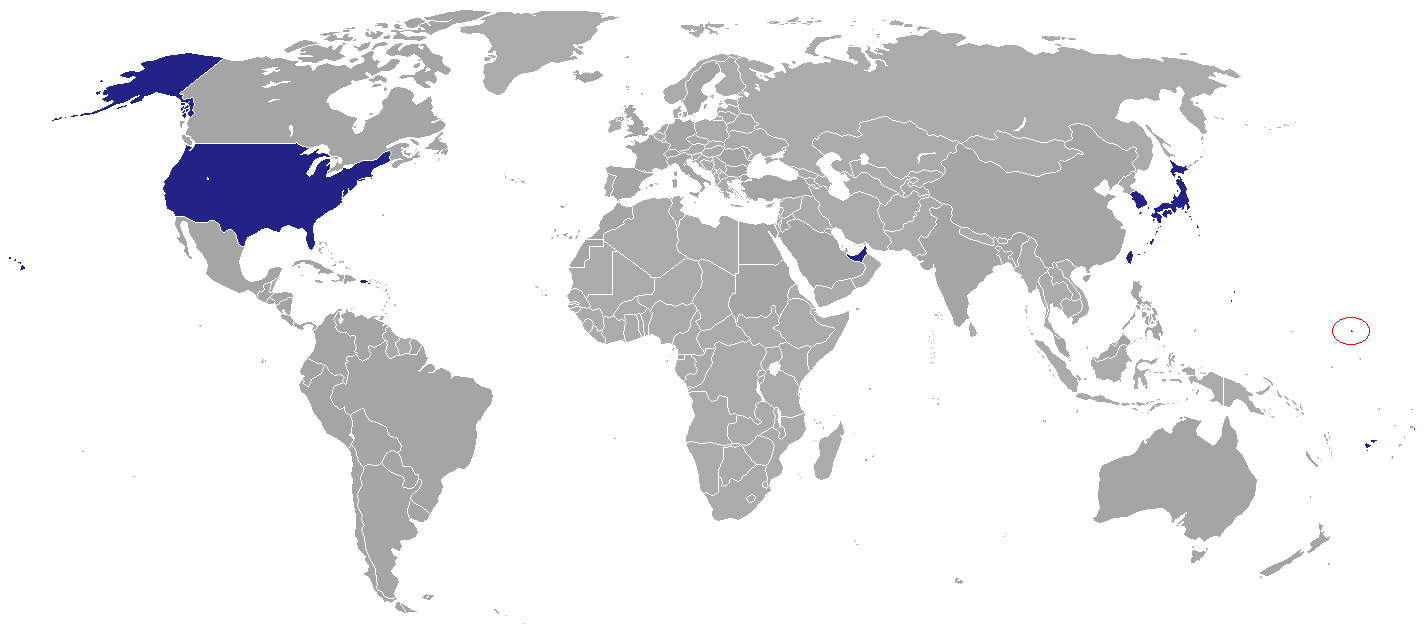
Diplomatic missions of the Marshall Islands

== Current missions ==
=== Americas ===
| Host country | Host city | Mission | Concurrent accreditation | Ref. |
|---|---|---|---|---|
| United States | Washington, D.C. | Embassy | Countries: Canada | |
| United States | Honolulu | Consulate-General | Countries: Canada | |
| United States | Portland | Consulate-General | Countries: Canada | |
| United States | Springdale | Consulate-General | Countries: Canada | |

=== Asia ===
| Host country | Host city | Mission | Concurrent accreditation | Ref. |
|---|---|---|---|---|
| Japan | Tokyo | Embassy | Countries: Brunei; India; Mongolia; Myanmar; Thailand | |
| Republic of China (Taiwan) | Taipei | Embassy | Countries: Cambodia; Indonesia; Malaysia; Philippines; Singapore; Vietnam | |
| South Korea | Seoul | Embassy | | |
| United Arab Emirates | Abu Dhabi | Embassy | | |

=== Oceania ===
| Host country | Host city | Mission | Concurrent accreditation | Ref. |
|---|---|---|---|---|
| Fiji | Suva | Embassy | Countries: Cook Islands; Australia; Kiribati; Micronesia; Nauru; New Zealand; Palau; Papua New Guinea; Samoa; Solomon Islands; Tuvalu; Tonga; Vanuatu | |

=== Multilateral organizations ===
| Organization | Host city | Host country | Mission | Concurrent accreditation | Ref. |
|---|---|---|---|---|---|
| United Nations | Geneva | Switzerland | Permanent Mission | Countries: Switzerland | |
| United Nations | New York City | United States | Permanent Mission | Countries: Brazil; Guatemala; International Organizations: Organisation for the Prohibition of Chemical Weapons | |

== Gallery ==
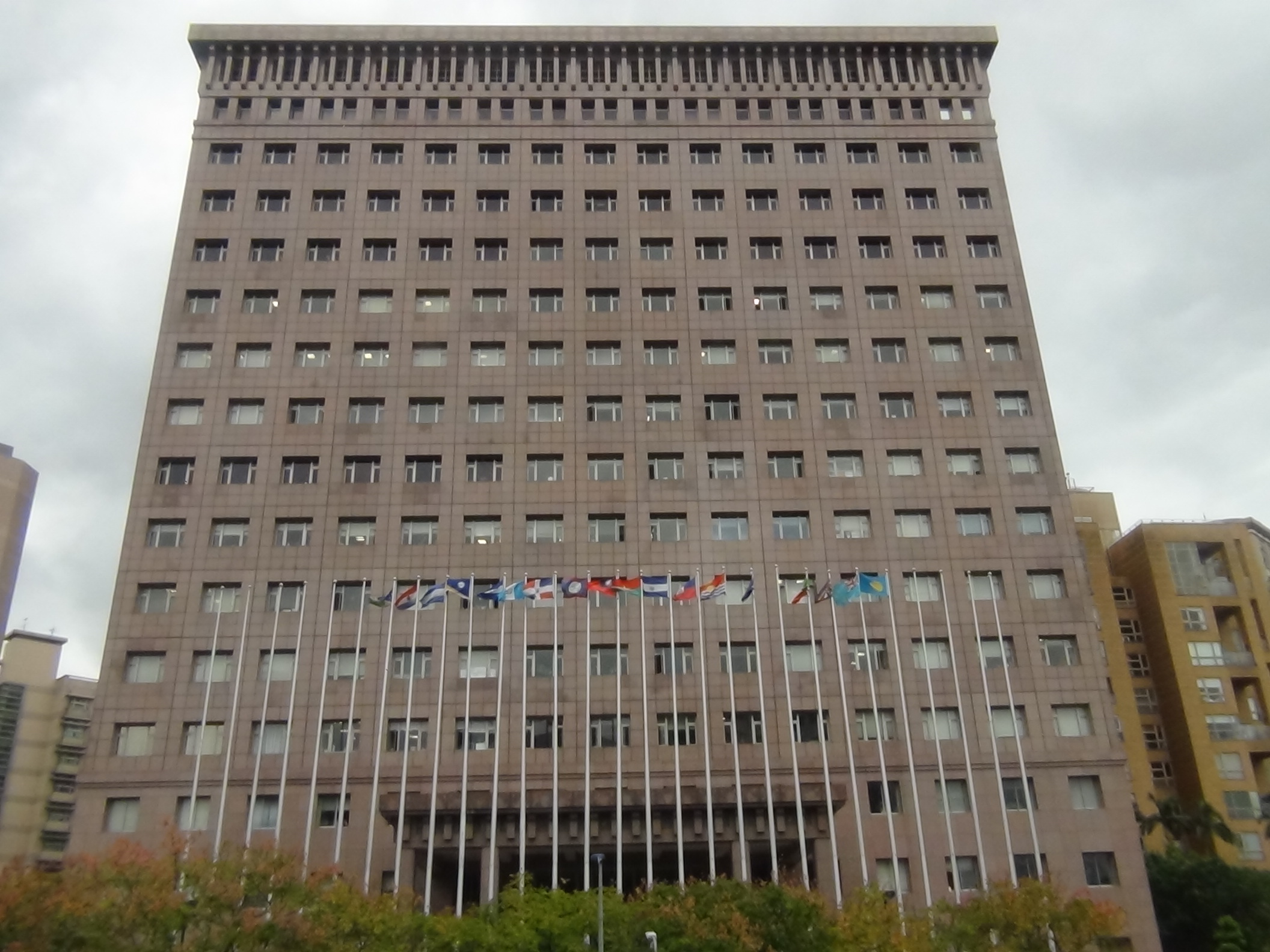
Embassy in Taipei

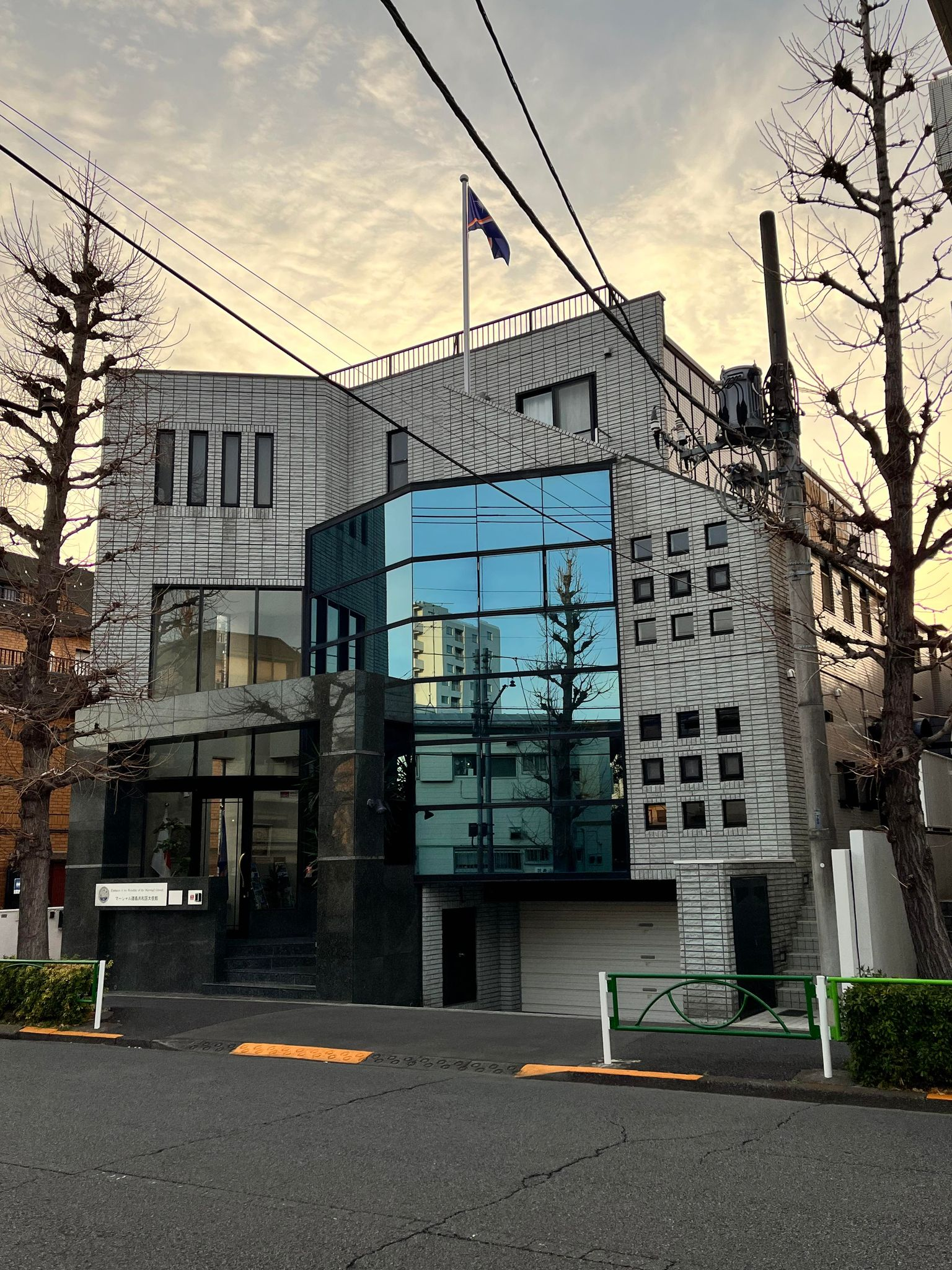
Embassy in Tokyo

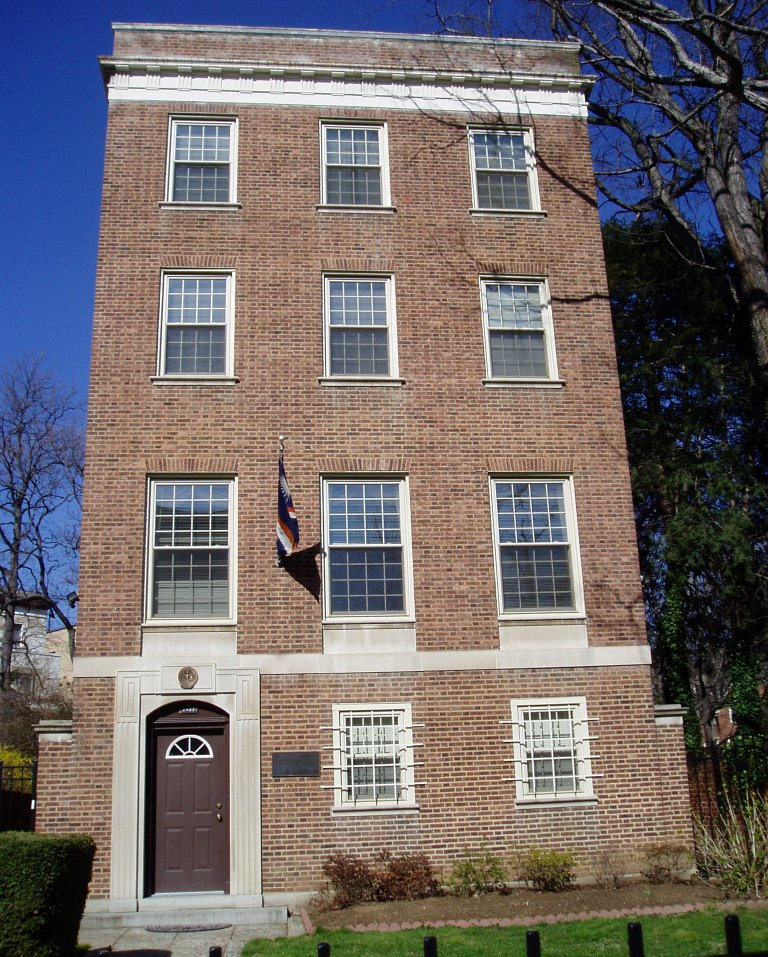
Embassy in Washington, D.C.

== See also ==
- Foreign relations of the Marshall Islands
- List of diplomatic missions in the Marshall Islands
