= Australia–Micronesia relations =

Australia–Federated States of Micronesia relations
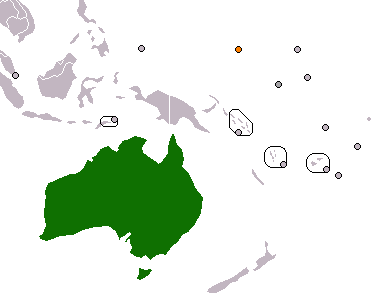

- Australia: Federated States of Micronesia

Australia–Federated States of Micronesia relations are the bilateral relations between Australia and Federated States of Micronesia (FSM). Australia was the first country to start diplomatic relations with FSM in 1987 and is one of the four countries that have resident ambassadors to Micronesia. The two countries are members of the Pacific Islands Forum.

Between 2006 and 2013, Australia was the third largest donor of aid to the Federated States of Micronesia, behind Japan and the United States.

== History ==
The rise of copra in Micronesia during the 1870s attracted foreign traders, including those from Australia. Andrew Farrell, an Australian trader, wrote in his journal:

In return for copra, islanders first demanded tobacco, and it had to be the best. Scores of other articles were in demand, like cloths, axes and knives, hand sowing machines, scissors, needles and thread, mirrors and cones, hooks and line, pots and pans, mouth organs, rice, hard biscuits, beads, perfume and, in the Gilberts and Marshalls, rifles, flintlock muskets, revolvers, powder and shot.

— Andrew Farrell,

Australia became one of the first countries in the Oceanian region to gain independence in 1901, while several islands within the Micronesian archipelagos collectively became an independent nation known as the Federated States of Micronesia in 1986.

== High level visits ==
In 1988, former President of FSM, John Haglelgam paid an official visit to Canberra.

== Maritime security ==
Australia assists FSM in maritime security under its 'Pacific Patrol Boat Program'. As part of the program, Australia has been providing Pacific class patrol vessels to FSM to be used in ensuring maritime surveillance, law enforcement, emergency relief operations, apprehending and preventing sea-borne security threats and delivering needed government services to outlying remote islands in the federation.

At a handover ceremony in Henderson, Western Australia in March 2022, FSM received the first of two Guardian-class Patrol Boats from Australia.

== Cooperation ==
The Federated States of Micronesia has supported Australia at various international and regional forums, as shown by the FSM government's support for the Canberra-led peace effort in the Solomon Islands, known as RAMSI.

The Australian government launched the $320 million Pacific Women Shaping Pacific Development program in 2012, to improve the political, economic and social opportunities of Pacific women, including in FS Micronesia.

In 2012, then President Joseph Urusemal appreciated Australian assistance to FSM and said, "Australia has been very helpful during these past many years." In 2013, a member of the Micronesian Congress visited Australia to discuss the bilateral cooperation in sports for the youth development in FSM.

Between 2012 and 2016, the Australian government claims to have educated 8,500 school children in FS Micronesia (and the Marshall Islands) about climate change mitigation and disaster risk management. Since 2012, they have also assisted 26 Micronesians in gaining tertiary qualifications.

In 2019-20, the Australian government provided an estimated $8.4 million in total Official Development Assistance (ODA) to FS Micronesia, Palau and the Marshall Islands.

on 27 May 2021, Australian Ambassador to FSM Jo Cowley met President David W. Panuelo, who stated "Australia has shown... that it is a true friend of the FSM... in ways both measurable and immeasurable."

Australia, along with Japan and the United States, pledged a new undersea internet cable for Nauru, Kiribati and the Federated States of Micronesia during December 2021.

== See also ==
- Foreign relations of Australia
- Foreign relations of the Federated States of Micronesia
