= History of the Jews in Palau =

Palauan Jews יהודי פלאו
Total population
- <10 (excluding half-Jews)

Languages
- English, Hebrew, Palauan

Religion
- Judaism

The history of the Jews in Palau is a relatively recent development, beginning with the arrival of the Israeli-born couple Tova and Navot Bornovski, and their children, who moved to Palau in 1993 to operate the Fish 'n Fins diving center and the Barracuda Restaurant. The family expanded and added two children, who were the first recorded Jewish children born on Palau. Both children have native middle names.

The most prominent Jewish citizen was Stuart Beck, a Jewish-American lawyer who helped negotiate the Compact of Free Association which established Palau as an independent nation in 1994, held honorary citizenship, and was named Palau's first Permanent Representative to the United Nations in 2003. Larry Miller was an Associate Justice of the Palau Supreme Court.

Two cyclists from Palau represented the country at the 2009 Maccabiah Games, marking the first time that Palau sent athletes to that international sporting event.

== Related reading ==
- Israel–Palau relations
