= Stuart Beck =

American lawyer (1946–2016)

His Excellency Stuart Beck

Palauan Ambassador to Oceans and Seas
- In office August 2013 – February 29, 2016
- Leader: Tommy Remengesau
- Secretary-General: Ban Ki-moon

Palauan Ambassador to the United Nations
- In office 2003–2013
- Succeeded by: Caleb T. O. Otto

Personal details
- Born: Stuart Jay Beck; December 23, 1946 Manhattan, New York, USA
- Died: February 29, 2016 (aged 69) Manhattan, New York
- Spouse: Ebiltulik Beck (m. 1983; 4 children)
- Education: Harvard University; Yale Law School

Stuart Jay Beck (December 23, 1946 – February 29, 2016) was an American law practitioner and a diplomat for Palau. As a lawyer he helped negotiate the Compact of Free Association, which established Palau as an independent nation in free association with the United States in 1994. For his contributions to Palau, he was granted honorary citizenship.

In 2003, he accepted the post for Palau's first Permanent Representative to the United Nations. He served continuously in this position until 2013, at which time he was appointed as Palau's first ever United Nations Ambassador for Oceans and Seas. In addition to that position, Beck co-chaired with Amir Dossal the Sustainable Oceans Alliance, an organization dedicated to the adoption by the General Assembly of a Sustainable Development Goal on Oceans.

== Education and early career ==
Born in Manhattan, New York, to Martin F. Beck and the former Lorraine Hills, Beck was raised in Brooklyn and Lawrence, Nassau County, New York, and attended Woodmere Academy.

Beck was educated at Harvard University (AB, 1968) and Yale Law School (JD, 1971). Beck's first career move following Yale Law School (1971 through 1977) was to work as an associate for a private law practice in Washington D.C. and New York City, which involved primarily civil and criminal litigation. After this time, Beck went on to co-found and preside as President of Granite Broadcasting Corporation (1988-2004), a diversified portfolio of network-affiliated television stations throughout the United States. In 1981, Beck also achieved partner at Richenthal, Birnbaum and Beck. He served at the firm until 1988.

== Personal life ==
Beck was Jewish. He returned to New York City after his work in Palau. With him, a young man named Leslie Tewid who would live with him and attend New York University under Beck's sponsorship. In early 1980, Leslie, a grade school classmate of Beck's future wife Ebiltulik, introduced the two of them. She is the mother of their four children. They lived in Manhattan, Bronxville, New York, and Brooklyn, New York, before moving to Manhattan where he passed, across the street from Sloan Kettering. On February 29, 2016, Beck died peacefully at home at the age of 69 from renal cancer.

== Political biography ==
As Chief Counsel for the Palau Political Status Commission (1977-1981), H.E. Beck negotiated the decolonization of Palau from the last United Nations trusteeship to a sovereign nation, organized a constitutional convention, negotiated a Compact of Free Association with the United States, and recruited John Kenneth Galbraith to serve as Palau's economic advisor.

While Ambassador and Permanent Representative, Beck spearheaded United Nations initiatives to stop bottom trawling and shark finning, among others. He founded Ambassadors for Responsibility on Climate Change (ARC) and successfully advanced a resolution to treat climate change as a security issue, prompting a Security Council debate on the topic. In August 2013, Beck relinquished his post as Permanent Representative and was appointed by President Tommy Remengesau as Palau's first ever Ambassador to the Oceans and Seas, with a mandate to initiate essential change at the international level for protection of the marine environments of the world. Ambassador Beck was a visiting lecturer at Yale Law School in 2012, co-teaching a course entitled "Climate Change and the International Court of Justice".

== Academic awards ==
- Winner, John Currier Gallagher Prize, 1971
- Chair, Thomas Swann Barrister's Union, 1970-1971

== United Nations initiatives and achievements ==
- Elected Vice-President of the General Assembly in 2007 and 2012 by Asia-Pacific Group. Served periodically as acting president of the General Assembly.
- Organized the Pacific Small Island Developing States (PSIDS) caucus. Consolidated a group of eleven Pacific states into a bloc at the UN, serving in a variety of capacities including chair, Subcommittee on Oceans and chair, Subcommittee on Engagement with Gulf States.
- Created UN Presence Initiative to increase recognition and outreach by UN to Pacific countries, resulting in first UN office in Palau.
- Initiated first deployment of Palauan UN Peacekeepers, including to Solomon Islands, East Timor, and Sudan.
- Led efforts to ban bottom trawling, resulting in the General Assembly's 2006 consensus resolution prohibiting, for the first time, bottom trawling in sensitive areas of the high seas.
- Organized international efforts to protect sharks, including: 2009 declaration of Palau as the world's first Shark Sanctuary. The launch of the Global Shark Coalition with Honduras, Bahamas, Colombia, Maldives, Marshall Islands, Mexico and Micronesia joining Palau as sanctuaries. Added language to various UN reports and resolutions to manage shark fishing and eliminate shark finning.
- Led international efforts to mitigate climate change and sea-level rise. Initiated General Assembly Resolution A/RES/63/281 in June 2009, passed by consensus with over 110 co-sponsors. The resolution characterized climate change for the first time as a security issue, and prompted the Security Council to conduct a debate entitled "Maintenance of International Peace and Security: Impact of Climate Change" in July 2011. Initiated a process to bring the issue of climate change to the International Court of Justice for an advisory opinion, including the circulation of a draft resolution to that effect, the organization of Ambassadors for Responsibility on Climate Change (the "ARC" group) and a panel of high-level experts to advise it. These initiatives were the basis for a course on international environmental law to be co-taught at Yale Law School in the fall of 2012.
- Served as a board member on the TerraMar Project and attended two United Nations meetings with Ghislaine Maxwell, an associate of Jeffrey Epstein.
