= Marshall Islands–Federated States of Micronesia relations =

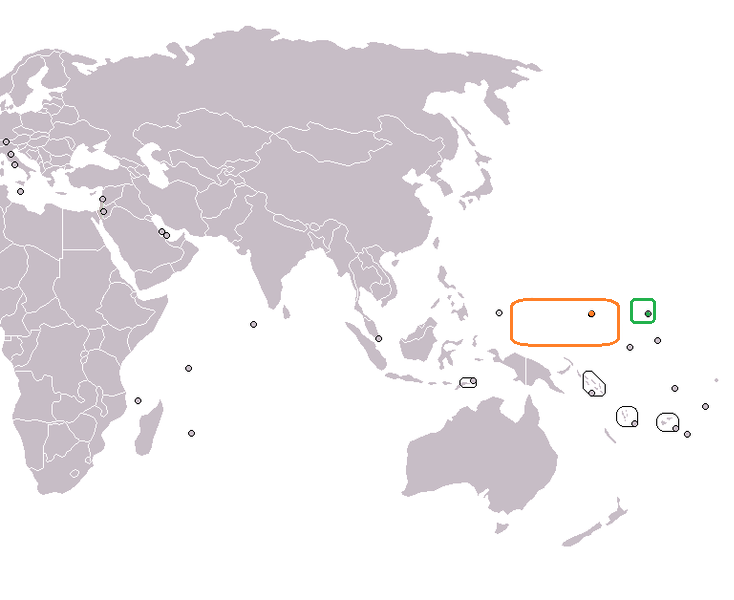

- Marshall Islands: Federated States of Micronesia

The Marshall Islands and the Federated States of Micronesia share a very close relationship with relations between the two countries being excellent. The Marshall Islands and the FSM are both associated states with the Compact of Free Association. The United States provides both with foreign aid and other programs. Similarly, Marshall Islands passport holders may enter Micronesia without a visa and Micronesian passport holders may enter the Marshall Islands without a visa. Both countries are staunch supporters of Israel in the United Nations, as is the U.S. They are also the staunchest supporters of the United States, along with Palau, another associated state of the U.S.

== See also ==
- Foreign relations of the Marshall Islands
- Foreign relations of the Federated States of Micronesia
