= Foreign relations of the Marshall Islands =

The Republic of the Marshall Islands has established bilateral diplomatic relations with 112 countries. Regional cooperation, through membership in various regional and international organizations, is a key element in its foreign policy.

The Marshall Islands became a member of the United Nations on September 17, 1991. The Marshall Islands maintains embassies in the United States, Fiji, South Korea, Japan, and the Republic of China (Taiwan). They also maintain a consulate in Honolulu, Hawaii and in Springdale, Arkansas, United States.

== Diplomatic relations ==
List of countries which the Marshall Islands maintains diplomatic relations with:

#	Country	Date
1	United States	21 October 1986
2	Federated States of Micronesia	26 February 1987
3	Australia	8 July 1987
4	Israel	16 September 1987
5	Fiji	22 January 1988
6	Kiribati	4 June 1988
7	New Zealand	17 June 1988
8	Philippines	15 September 1988
9	Papua New Guinea	21 September 1988
10	Japan	9 December 1988
11	Chile	25 January 1990
12	Solomon Islands	23 May 1990
13	Vanuatu	1 August 1990
14	Tuvalu	14 September 1990
15	Samoa	22 October 1990
—	China (suspended)	16 November 1990
16	Nauru	22 February 1991
17	South Korea	16 March 1991
18	Germany	23 September 1991
19	Peru	14 November 1991
20	Cyprus	17 November 1991
21	Maldives	16 December 1991
22	Poland	17 December 1991
23	Spain	17 December 1991
24	United Kingdom	2 February 1992
25	Sweden	12 February 1992
26	Greece	14 February 1992
27	Egypt	2 May 1992
28	Vietnam	1 June 1992
29	Costa Rica	15 June 1992
30	Colombia	5 August 1992
31	Russia	6 August 1992
32	Singapore	28 August 1992
33	Denmark	17 September 1992
34	Norway	16 October 1992
35	Slovenia	19 October 1992
36	Saint Lucia	1992
37	Malaysia	4 January 1993
38	Iceland	25 January 1993
39	Finland	26 January 1993
40	Mexico	28 January 1993
41	Saint Vincent and the Grenadines	28 January 1993
42	Seychelles	2 February 1993
43	France	19 February 1993
44	Austria	1 March 1993
45	Netherlands	2 March 1993
46	Barbados	23 March 1993
47	Argentina	23 April 1993
48	Belize	30 April 1993
49	Indonesia	21 May 1993
50	Luxembourg	20 July 1993
51	Italy	24 September 1993
52	Thailand	29 October 1993
—	Holy See	30 December 1993
53	Malta	8 February 1994
54	Portugal	10 February 1995
55	Andorra	23 February 1995
56	Kuwait	27 September 1995
57	Cape Verde	1 December 1995
58	Ukraine	22 December 1995
59	Brunei	17 January 1996
60	South Africa	17 January 1996
61	Romania	29 January 1996
62	Belgium	29 May 1996
63	Turkmenistan	8 October 1996
64	Mauritius	23 October 1996
65	India	2 February 1997
66	Canada	14 August 1997
67	Palau	1 August 1998
—	Republic of China	20 November 1998
68	Slovakia	29 January 1999
—	Sovereign Military Order of Malta	3 May 2002
69	Switzerland	22 January 2003
70	North Macedonia	27 February 2003
71	Turkey	11 April 2008
72	Czech Republic	30 April 2009
73	Uruguay	2 December 2009
74	Georgia	18 February 2010
75	Tajikistan	18 February 2010
76	Azerbaijan	10 March 2010
77	United Arab Emirates	3 June 2010
78	Brazil	27 July 2010
79	Morocco	13 September 2010
80	Estonia	12 July 2013
—	Cook Islands	3 September 2013
—	Kosovo	27 October 2013
81	Mongolia	23 May 2015
82	Cuba	28 September 2015
83	Monaco	29 September 2015
84	Kyrgyzstan	22 December 2016
85	Cambodia	20 January 2017
86	Myanmar	21 April 2017
87	Guatemala	20 July 2017
88	El Salvador	22 September 2017
89	Saint Kitts and Nevis	18 December 2018
90	Kazakhstan	12 February 2019
91	Eswatini	15 April 2019
92	Nicaragua	13 June 2019
93	Bosnia and Herzegovina	23 September 2019
94	Dominican Republic	23 September 2019
95	Croatia	24 September 2019
96	Ecuador	24 September 2019
97	Honduras	24 September 2019
98	Liechtenstein	24 September 2019
99	Lithuania	24 September 2019
100	Timor-Leste	25 September 2019
101	Algeria	26 September 2019
102	Lebanon	26 September 2019
103	Paraguay	26 September 2019
104	Hungary	27 September 2019
105	Ireland	27 September 2019
106	Latvia	19 September 2022
107	Tonga	21 September 2022
108	Jamaica	23 September 2022
109	Bulgaria	12 June 2023
110	Nepal	23 June 2023
111	Qatar	11 July 2023
112	Pakistan	26 January 2024
113	Suriname	28 May 2024
114	Benin	2 July 2024
—	Niue	27 August 2024
115	Saudi Arabia	5 September 2024
116	Panama	23 September 2024
117	Gambia	25 September 2024
118	Rwanda	25 September 2024
119	Burkina Faso	26 September 2024
120	Serbia	27 September 2024
121	San Marino	28 September 2024
122	Antigua and Barbuda	24 September 2025
123	Ivory Coast	23 September 2026
124	Bahrain	24 September 2026

== Bilateral relations ==
Country	Notes
Equatorial Guinea	In August 2022, Equatoguinean forces boarded a Marshallese-flagged ship off its coasts and detained the ship's crew and kept them in custody for over nine months before deporting them. As a consequence, the Marshallese government sued Equatorian Guinea before the International Tribunal for the Law of the Sea and demanded nearly 60 million dollars in reparations over unlawful detention, crew mistreatment and damage to reputation. The case opened in early October 2025.
India	See India–Marshall Islands relations As per the Ministry of External Affairs of the Government of India, India established diplomatic relations with Republic of the Marshall Islands in April 1995. Development assistance from India has included a grant of US$100,000 in June 2008 for a solar street lighting project in the capital city of Majuro and grant of 5 ITEC scholarships in November 2010. Marshall Islands has been supportive of issues of importance to India, particularly Indian candidature to international organizations. It supported India's candidature for the non-permanent membership of the UN Security Council for the 2011–12 term. Presently, there are about 10 Indian nationals in the Marshall Islands.
Israel	See Israel–Marshall Islands relations
Kosovo	See Kosovo–Marshall Islands relations The Marshall Islands officially recognised the independence of the Republic of Kosovo on the 17 April 2008.
Micronesia	See Marshall Islands–Federated States of Micronesia relations The Marshall Islands and Micronesia share very good relations, as they are both bound by Compacts of Free Association with the United States.
Mexico	Marshall Islands does not have an accreditation to Mexico; Mexico is accredited to the Marshall Islands from its embassy in Manila, Philippines.
Palau	See Marshall Islands–Palau relations The Marshall Islands and Palau share very good relations, as they are both bound by Compacts of Free Association with the United States.
South Korea	Bilateral trade of both countries in 2020 were about 4.83 billion $.
Turkey	Turkish ambassador in Canberra to Australia is also accredited to Marshall Islands.; Marshall Islands has an Honorary Consulate in Istanbul.; Trade volume between the two countries was negligible in 2018.
United Kingdom	See Marshall Islands–United Kingdom relations The Marshall Islands established diplomatic relations with the United Kingdom on 2 February 1992.: The Marshall Islands does not maintain an embassy in the United Kingdom.; The United Kingdom is not accredited to the Marshall Islands through an embassy; the UK develops relations through its high commission in Suva, Fiji.; Both countries share common membership of the International Criminal Court, the United Nations, and the World Health Organization. Bilaterally the two countries have a Tax Information Exchange Agreement.
United States	See Marshall Islands–United States relations The Marshall Islands and the United States maintain a strong and stable relationship under the Compact of Free Association. The US has full responsibility in the country's defense, financial aid, and social services. In return, the U.S. provides healthcare services, security, and freedom of movement between U.S., American Samoan, and Marshall Islander citizens. In international politics, Marshall Islands has often voted with the United States with respect to United Nations General Assembly resolutions.: Marshall Islands has an embassy in Washington, D.C., and consulates in Honolulu and Springdale.; United States has an embassy in Majuro.

== See also ==
- Compact of Free Association
- List of diplomatic missions in the Marshall Islands
- List of diplomatic missions of the Marshall Islands
- Trust Territory of the Pacific Islands
