= India–Micronesia relations =

India–Federated States of Micronesia relations
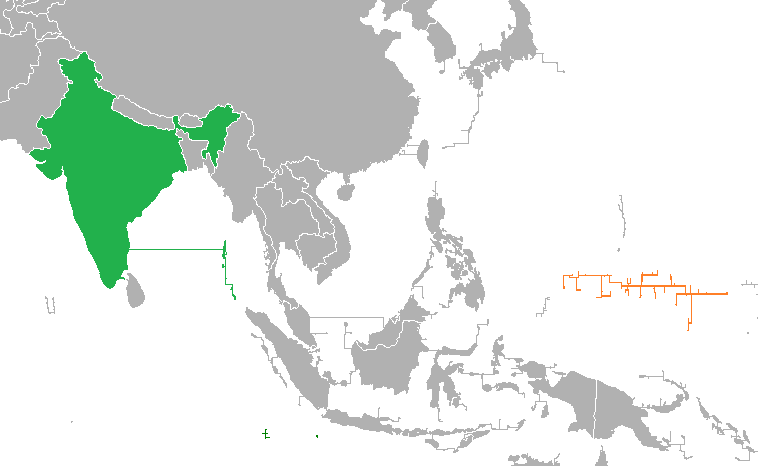

- India: Federated States of Micronesia

India–Micronesia relations are the international relations that exist between the Republic of India and the Federated States of Micronesia (FSM). The Embassy of India in Manila, Philippines is concurrently accredited to FSM.

== History ==
Diplomatic relations between India and Federated States of Micronesia were established on 29 November 1996. Since then, the two countries have conducted regular consultation and dialogue through the small island developing states (SIDS) forum of the United Nations (UN), of which Micronesia is a member. The country is also a member of the Pacific Islands Forum, of which India is an official dialogue partner. Bilateral relations received a boost following the initiation of the Forum of India-Pacific Islands Cooperation by the Narendra Modi government in 2014. A Micronesian delegation including Assistant Deputy Secretary for Asian Affairs Brendy Carl, and other senior officials attended the first India-Forum for Pacific Island Countries (FIPIC) Summit hosted in Suva, Fiji on 19 November 2014 by Prime Minister Modi.

Micronesia voted for India's candidacy for a Non-Permanent Seat on the UN Security Council for the year 2011–12. Minister of Health and Social Affairs Vita Skilling and National Child Health Physician Anamaria Akapito Yomai participated in the Second High Level Meeting (HLM) on South-South Cooperation for Child Rights in Asia and the Pacific held at New Delhi in October 2013.

Vice-President Yosiwo Palikkun George led a Micronesian delegation to attend the 2nd Summit of Forum for India Pacific Islands Cooperation (FIPIC) held in Jaipur on 21 August 2015.

INS Satpura visited Pohnpei on 18–19 August 2016 after participating in RIMPAC-16, and was the first Indian Navy ship to visit the country. The crew of the ship met with the FSM's Division of Maritime Surveillance, and senior Government and military authorities, and also held sporting and cultural interactions.

Minister of State, Ministry of Science and Technology, & Ministry of Earth Sciences Y.S. Chowdary visited Micronesia in January 2017 and met with Micronesian President Peter Christian. Following the visit, Chowdary stated that Micronesia had agreed to support India's candidature for a permanent seat in the UN Security Council.

== Trade ==
Bilateral trade between India and the FSM totaled US$600,000 in 2013–14, rising from $180,000 the previous fiscal. India exported $570,000 worth of goods to Micronesia and imported $100,000. The main commodities exported by India to Micronesia are pharmaceuticals, apparel and clothing, and electrical machinery and equipment. The commodities imported by India from Micronesia are natural or cultured pearls, precious and semi-precious stones, imitation jewellery, and coins.

At the 2nd FIPIC Summit, Prime Minister Modi announced that a FIPIC Trade Office would be opened at the FICCI premises in New Delhi. The trade office, named the FIPIC Business Accelerator, was officially opened on 7 September 2015. The Confederation of Indian Industries (CII) has also established a dedicated department at its headquarters in New Delhi focusing on boosting trade with Pacific Island Countries.

== Cultural relations ==
As of January 2016, 37 Indians reside in Micronesia. Boats carrying Indian asylum seekers and economic migrants attempting to sail to Australia and New Zealand, have occasionally washed up on a shore in Micronesia.

== Foreign aid ==
India announced that it would provide a grant-in-aid of US$100,000 annually to each of the 14 Pacific Island countries, including FSM, at the Post Forum Dialogue partner meeting in 2006. The amount was increased to US$125,000 annually from 2009. At the first FIPIC Summit on 19 November 2014, Prime Minister Modi announced numerous steps that India would take to improve relations with Pacific Island countries, including FSM, such as easing visa policies, increase in grant-in-aid to Pacific Island Countries to $200,000 each annually, and several measures to boost bilateral trade and aid in the development of the Pacific Island countries.

India provided grants of nearly $50,000 in 2005 to procure machinery for extraction of virgin coconut oil, $74,000 in 2009 to procure machinery for the coconut industry, grant-in-aid of $100,000 in 2011 to upgrade and increase the production of coconut crude oil in the FSM. India provided $200,000 to enable FSM to conduct an integrated agriculture census in 2015.

Citizens of Micronesia are eligible for scholarships under the Indian Technical and Economic Cooperation Programme.

== See also ==
- Foreign relations of India
- Foreign relations of Micronesia
