= List of diplomatic missions of South Ossetia =

Map of diplomatic missions of South Ossetia South Ossetia South Ossetian embassy South Ossetian representative office South Ossetian embassy, non-resident

This article lists the diplomatic missions of South Ossetia. South Ossetia is state with limited recognition in Northern Caucasus. It did not receive recognition from any UN member states until after the 2008 South Ossetia war. It is recognized by Nauru, Nicaragua, Russia and Venezuela. In addition, it is recognized also by Abkhazia, Nagorno-Karabakh and Transnistria, which are not members of the United Nations. At present, South Ossetia has two embassies (Note: There are two embassies in Moscow accredited to South Ossetia by Nicaragua and Venezuela.) and five representative offices abroad. The Donetsk People's Republic and Luhansk People's Republic had diplomatic relations with South Ossetia, with each having representative offices prior to being annexed by Russia in 2022.

== Asia ==
- Turkey
  - Istanbul (Representative Office)

== Europe ==
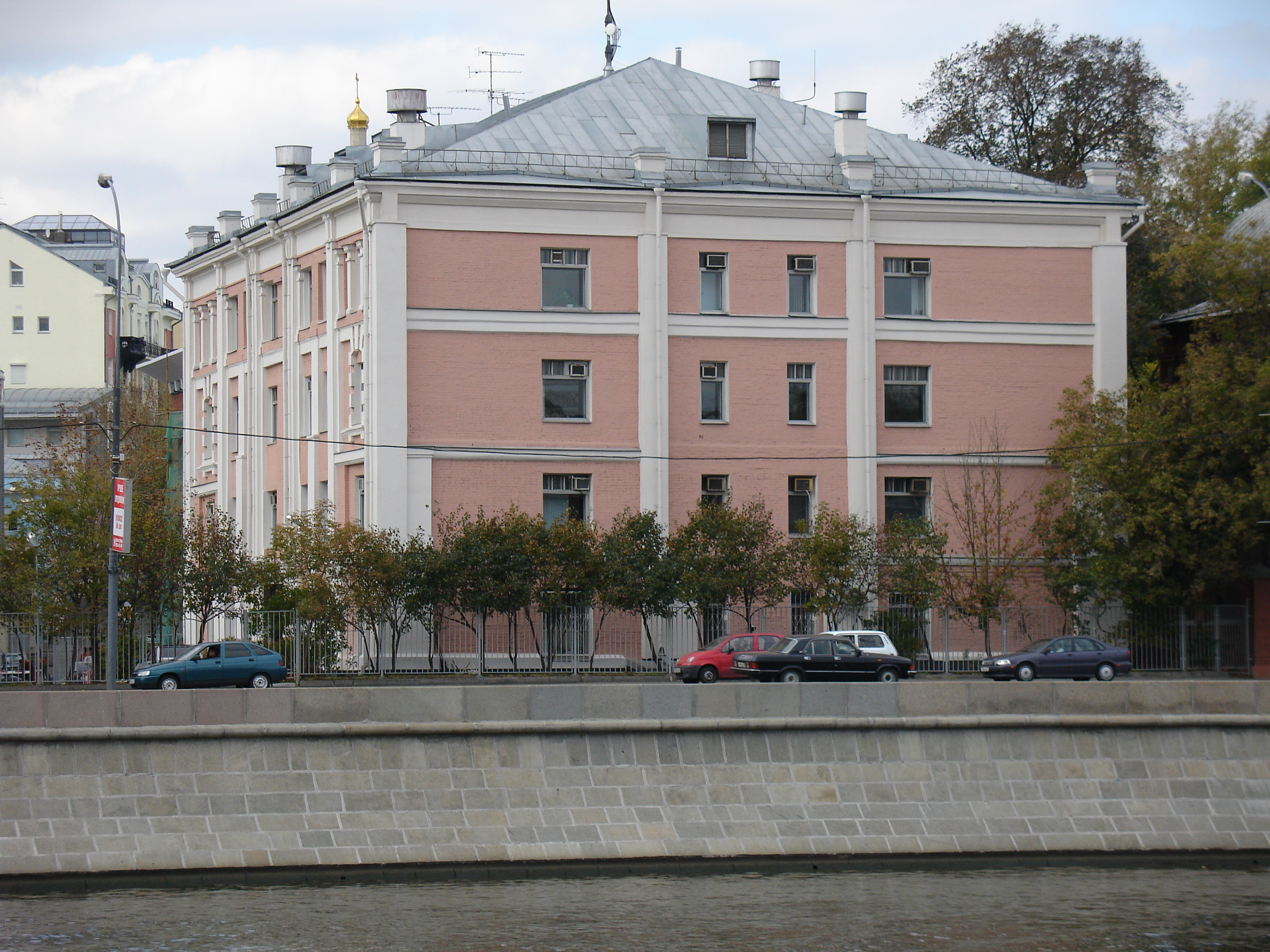
South Ossetian embassy in Moscow, Russia

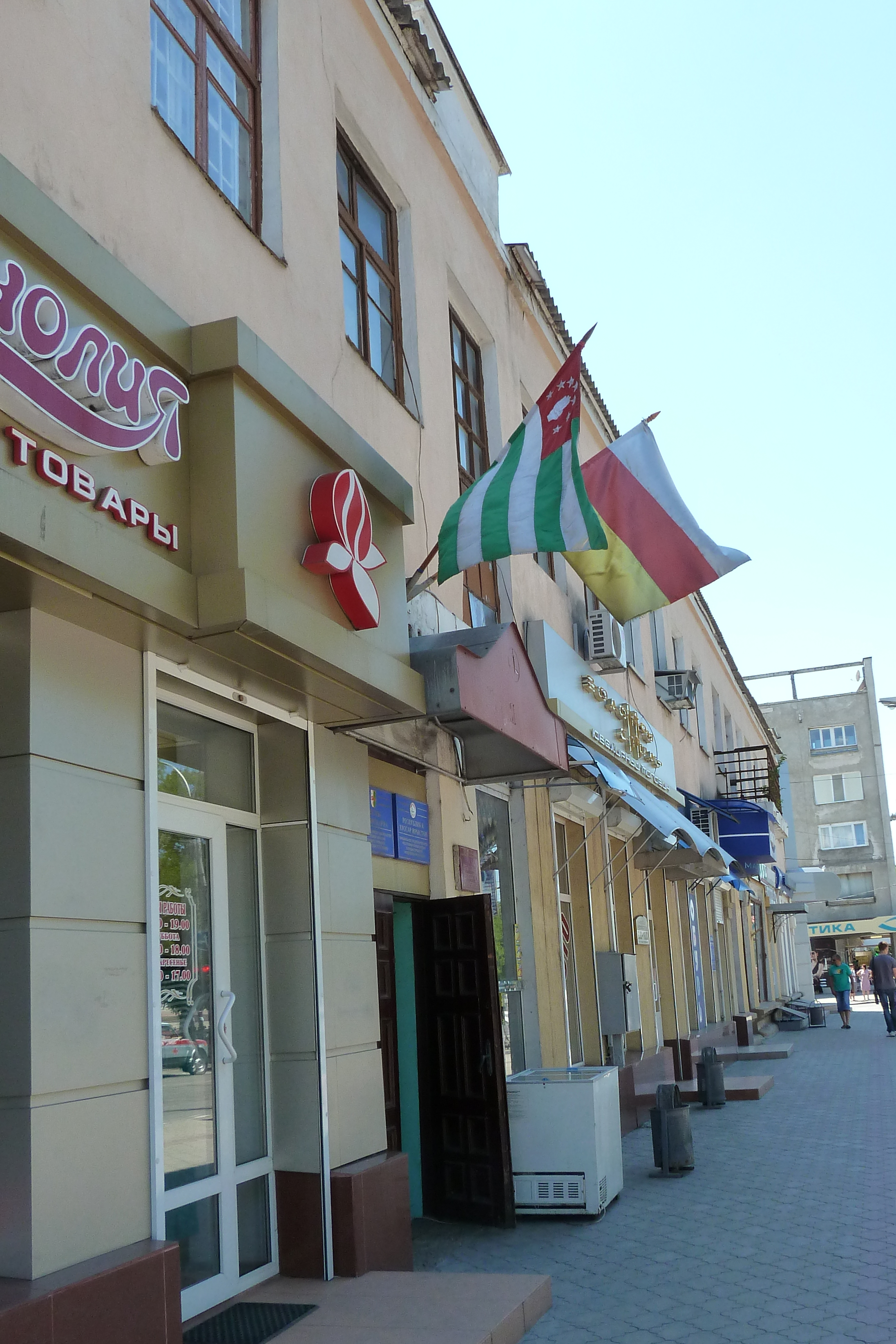
South Ossetian representative office in Tiraspol, Transnistria

- Abkhazia
  - Sukhumi (Embassy)
- Italy
  - Rome (Representative office) (Note: The government of Italy does not recognize neither "the self-proclaimed representative office" nor its diplomatic status.)
- Russia
  - Moscow (Embassy)
- Transnistria
  - Tiraspol (Representative office)

== Non-resident embassies ==
- Nicaragua (Tskhinvali)
- Venezuela (Tskhinvali)

== See also ==
- Foreign relations of South Ossetia
- List of diplomatic missions in South Ossetia
