= List of diplomatic missions of the Federated States of Micronesia =

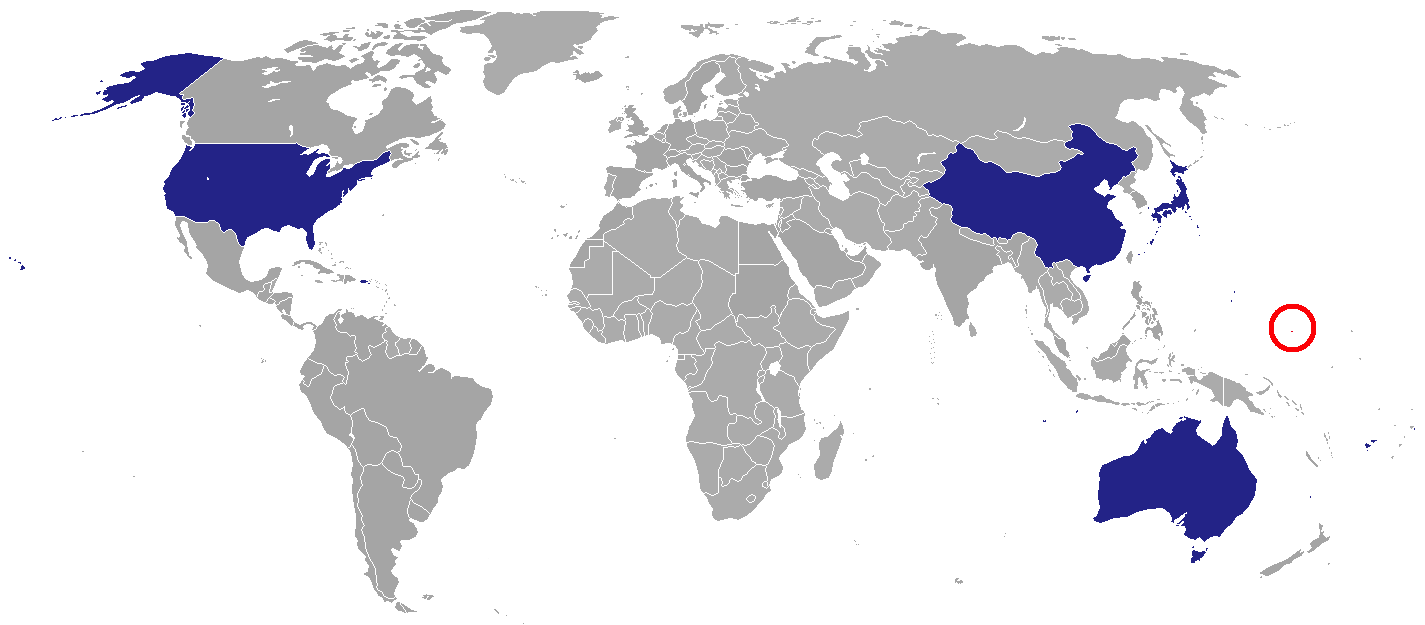
Diplomatic missions of the Federated States of Micronesia

This is a list of diplomatic missions of the Federated States of Micronesia. The Federated States of Micronesia became independent from the United States in 1986. The FSM maintains permanent embassies in five Asia-Pacific nations: Australia, China, Fiji, Japan and the United States. The FSM also maintains three resident consulates in Honolulu, HI, Portland, Oregon and Tamuning, GU.

== Current missions ==
=== Americas ===
Host country	Host city	Mission	Concurrent accreditation	Ref.
United States	Washington, D.C.	Embassy	Countries: Canada; Israel	
United States	Honolulu	Consulate-General	Countries: Canada; Israel	
United States	Portland	Consulate-General	Countries: Canada; Israel	
United States	Tamuning (Guam)	Consulate-General	Countries: Canada; Israel	

=== Asia ===
Host country	Host city	Mission	Concurrent accreditation	Ref.
China	Beijing	Embassy	Countries: Thailand	
Japan	Tokyo	Embassy	Countries: Malaysia; Philippines; Singapore	

=== Oceania ===
Host country	Host city	Mission	Concurrent accreditation	Ref.
Australia	Canberra	Embassy		
Fiji	Suva	Embassy	Countries: Solomon Islands	

=== Multilateral organizations ===
Organization	Host city	Host country	Mission	Concurrent accreditation	Ref.
United Nations	New York City	United States	Permanent Mission	Countries: Guatemala	
United Nations	Geneva	Switzerland	Permanent Mission	Countries: Holy See	

== Gallery ==
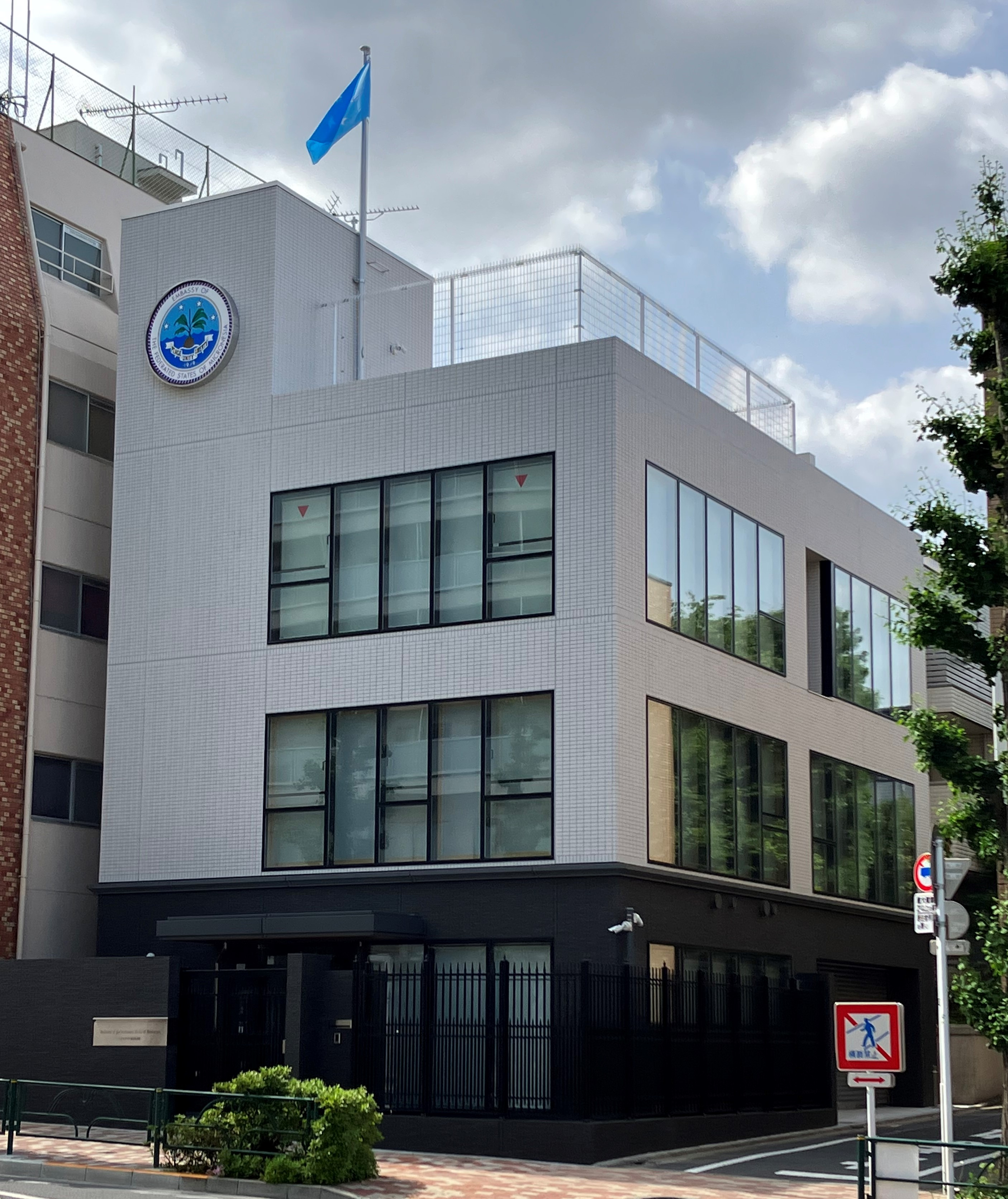
Embassy in Tokyo

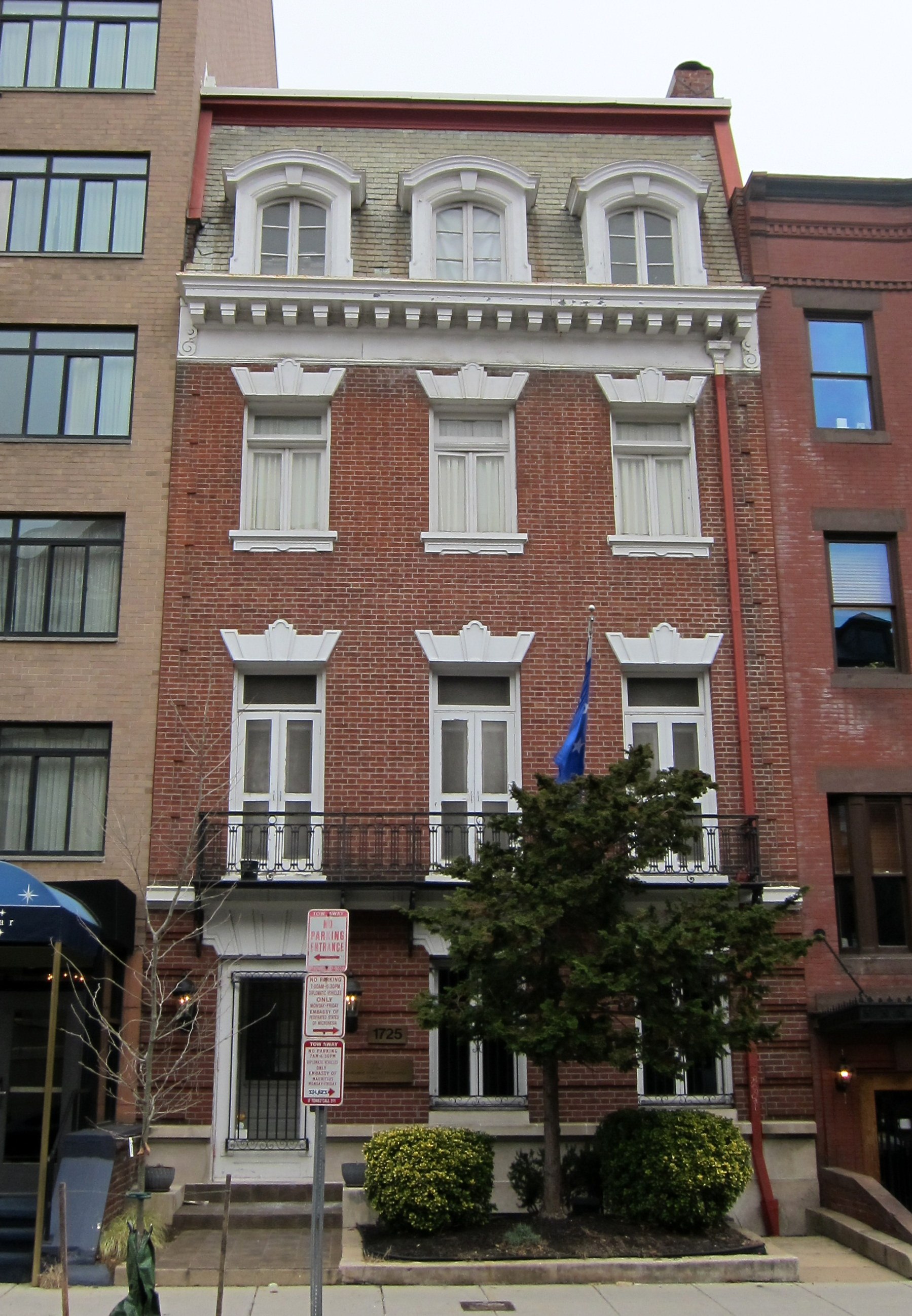
Embassy in Washington, D.C.

== See also ==
- Foreign relations of the Federated States of Micronesia
- List of diplomatic missions in the Federated States of Micronesia
