= United Nations General Assembly Resolution 58/292 =

The United Nations General Assembly Resolution 58/292 of 6 May 2004 was a resolution in which the United Nations General Assembly affirmed that the status of the Palestinian territory occupied since 1967, including East Jerusalem, remains one of military occupation, and that Israel has only the duties and obligations of an occupying Power under the Geneva Convention relative to the Protection of Civilian Persons and the Hague Convention.

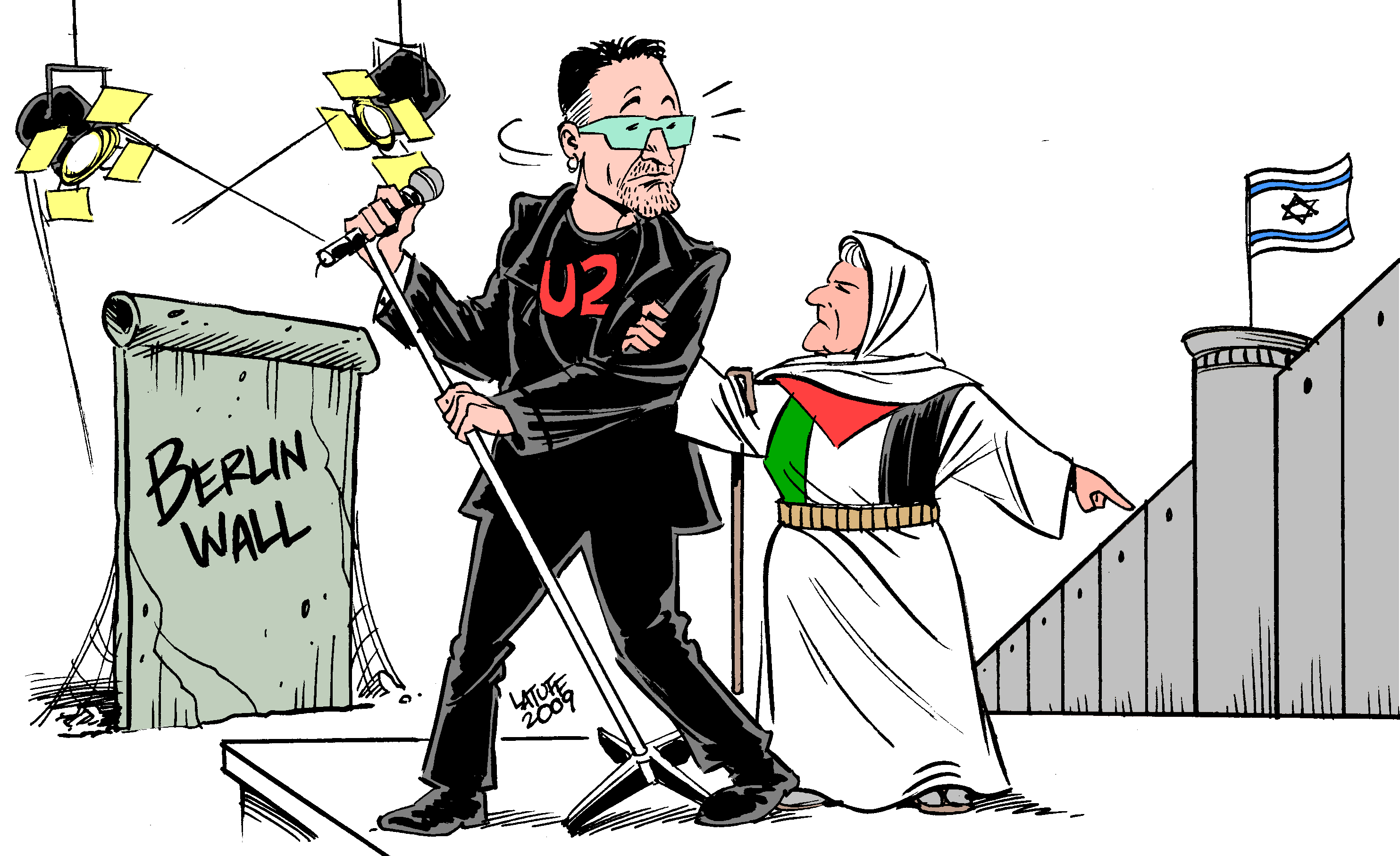
Satire of the Palestine wall

Further it was reaffirmed that the Palestinian people have the right to self-determination and to sovereignty over their territory.

The General Assembly expressed its determination to contribute to the achievement of the inalienable rights of the Palestinian people. Also it was expressed that a peace settlement in the Middle East should result in two viable, sovereign and independent States, based on the pre-1967 borders.

The preamble reaffirmed the principle of the inadmissibility of the acquisition of territory by force, and the need to enable the Palestinian people to exercise sovereignty and to achieve independence in their State, Palestine,

The resolution is titled 58/292. Status of the Occupied Palestinian Territory, including East Jerusalem.

== Text of Resolution 58/292 ==
The General Assembly,

Recalling its resolutions 3237 (XXIX) of 22 November 1974, 43/177 of 15 December 1988 and 52/250 of 7 July 1998,

Recalling also Security Council resolutions 242 (1967) of 22 November 1967, 338 (1973) of 22 October 1973, 1397 (2002) of 12 March 2002 and 1515 (2003) of 19 November 2003,

Recalling further the relevant provisions of international law, as well as relevant United Nations resolutions, with regard to Israeli settlements and to Occupied East Jerusalem,

Reaffirming the principle of the inadmissibility of the acquisition of territory by force,

Noting that Palestine, in its capacity as observer and pending its attainment of full membership in the United Nations, does not present credentials to the General Assembly,

Affirming the need to enable the Palestinian people to exercise sovereignty and to achieve independence in their State, Palestine,

1. Affirms that the status of the Palestinian territory occupied since 1967, including East Jerusalem, remains one of military occupation, and affirms, in accordance with the rules and principles of international law and relevant resolutions of the United Nations, including Security Council resolutions, that the Palestinian people have the right to self-determination and to sovereignty over their territory and that Israel, the occupying Power, has only the duties and obligations of an occupying Power under the Geneva Convention relative to the Protection of Civilian Persons in Time of War, of 12 August 1949 and the Regulations annexed to the Hague Convention respecting the Laws and Customs of War on Land, of 1907;

2. Expresses its determination to contribute to the achievement of the inalienable rights of the Palestinian people and the attainment of a just and comprehensive negotiated peace settlement in the Middle East resulting in two viable, sovereign and independent States, Israel and Palestine, based on the pre-1967 borders and living side by side in peace and security.

== Votes ==
The resolution was adopted with 140 votes in favour and 11 abstentions. Israel, the United States, Palau, the Federated States of Micronesia, the Marshall Islands and Nauru were the only states that voted against the resolution.
