= List of diplomatic missions in the Marshall Islands =

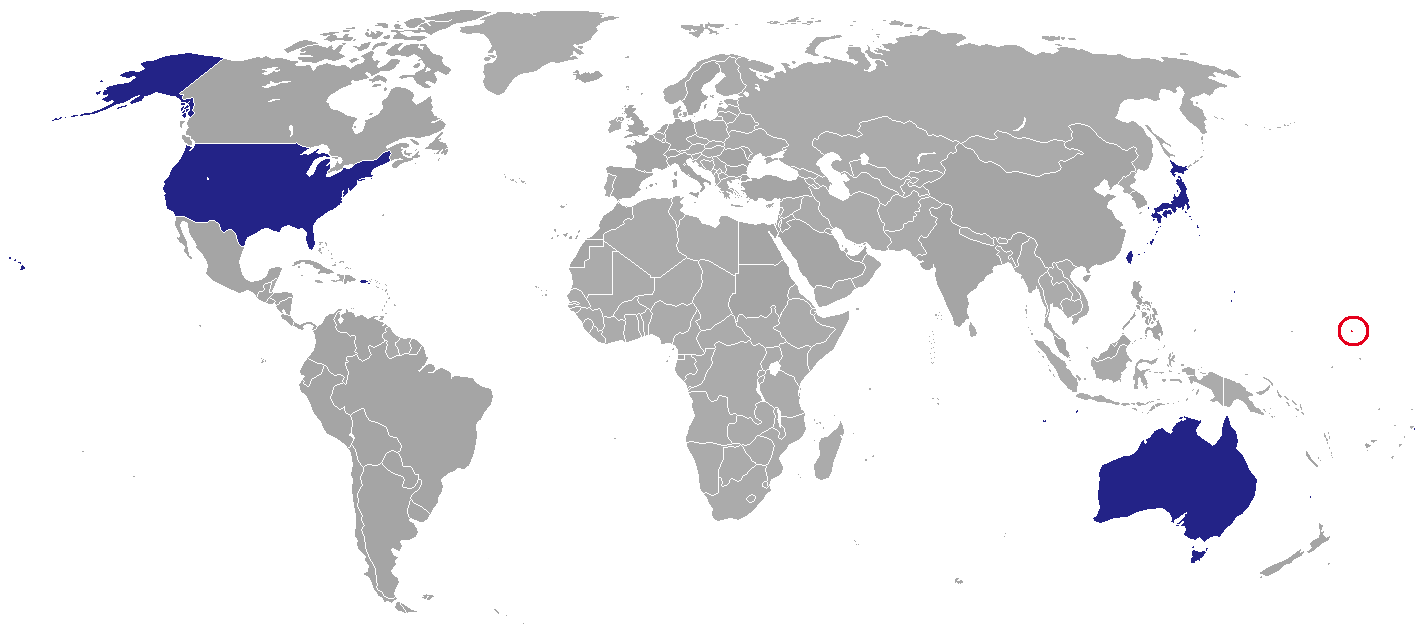
Diplomatic missions in the Marshall Islands

This is a list of diplomatic missions in the Marshall Islands. There are four embassies in the capital, Majuro.

== Embassies ==
Majuro

1. Australia
2. Republic of China (Taiwan)
3. Japan
4. United States

== Non-resident embassies ==
Resident in Manila

- Belgium
- Colombia
- Czechia
- France
- Germany
- Indonesia
- Ireland
- Mexico
- Morocco
- Netherlands
- Spain
- Switzerland

Resident in Canberra

- Austria
- Canada
- Finland
- Mauritius
- Poland
- South Africa
- Vietnam

Resident in Suva

- European Union
- South Korea
- United Kingdom

Resident in Tokyo

- Algeria
- Estonia
- Georgia
- Greece
- India
- Kyrgyzstan
- Maldives
- Malaysia
- Norway
- Kosovo
- Philippines
- Slovakia
- Saudi Arabia
- Sweden
- Thailand
- Turkmenistan
- Tajikistan
- Tunisia
- Uzbekistan
- Venezuela
- Zambia
- Zimbabwe

Resident elsewhere

- Chile (New York City)
- Croatia (Washington, D.C.)
- Denmark (Singapore)
- Egypt (Wellington)
- Ghana (Washington, D.C.)
- Israel (Jerusalem)
- Italy (Wellington)
- New Zealand (Honolulu)
- Seychelles (New York City)
- Sierra Leone (Seoul)
- United Arab Emirates (Wellington)

== See also ==
- Foreign relations of the Marshall Islands
- List of diplomatic missions of the Marshall Islands
