= List of diplomatic missions in South Ossetia =

Map of diplomatic missions in South Ossetia South Ossetia States with embassy in South Ossetia States with representative office in South Ossetia States with non-resident embassy to South Ossetia

This article lists the diplomatic missions in South Ossetia. South Ossetia is a region that broke away from Georgia in 1991 and got its first international recognition after the 2008 South Ossetia war. The country has been recognized by Abkhazia, Donetsk People's Republic (Note: Annexed by Russia on 30 September 2022), Luhansk People's Republic, Nauru, Nagorno-Karabakh, Nicaragua, Russia, Transnistria, and Venezuela. At present, the capital Tskhinvali hosts two embassies and three representative office. Venezuelan and Nicaraguan ambassadors reside in Moscow.

== Embassies ==
Tskhinvali

- Abkhazia
- Russia

== Representative offices ==
- Transnistria

== Non-resident embassies ==
- Nicaragua (Moscow)
- Venezuela (Moscow)

== See also ==
- Foreign relations of South Ossetia
- List of diplomatic missions of South Ossetia
