= Marshall Islands–United States relations =

- Marshall Islands: United States

Marshall Islands–United States relations are bilateral relations between Marshall Islands and the United States.

== History ==
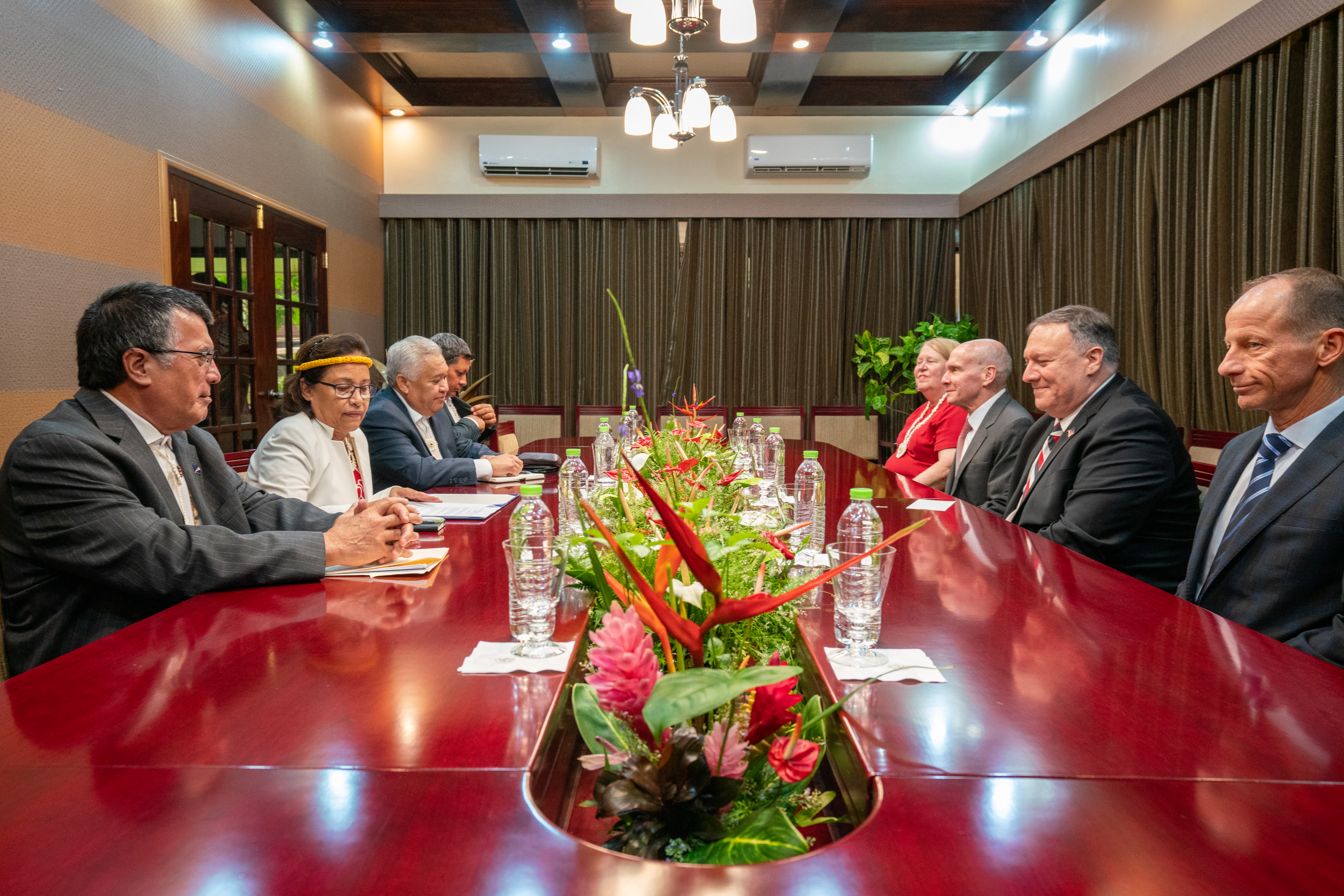
Marshall Islands President Hilda Heine meets with US Secretary of State Mike Pompeo in 2019

During World War II, the United States took control of the islands from Japan (which governed them as part of the South Seas Mandate) in the 1944 Gilbert and Marshall Islands campaign. The US military conducted nuclear testing on Bikini Atoll in 1946 through 1958. In 1965, the US government formed the Congress of Micronesia, a plan for increased self-governance of Pacific islands. The Trust Territory of the Pacific Islands in 1979 provided independence to the Marshall Islands, whose constitution and president were formally recognized by the US.

The Republic of the Marshall Islands is now a sovereign state in free association with the United States. After more than a decade of negotiation, the Marshall Islands and the United States signed a Compact of Free Association on June 25, 1983. The people of the Marshall Islands approved the Compact in a UN-observed plebiscite on September 7, 1983. The U.S. Congress subsequently approved the Compact, adding several amendments which were accepted by the Government of the Marshall Islands, and the Compact was entered into force on October 21, 1986. From 1999 to 2003, the two nations negotiated an Amended Compact that entered into force on May 1, 2004. Under the Amended Compact, the U.S. will provide the Marshall Islands at least $57 million every year until 2023, including contributions to a jointly managed Trust Fund. Marshallese will continue to have access to many U.S. programs and services. A Joint Economic Management and Financial Accountability Committee (JEMFAC) composed of representatives of both governments will ensure that Compact assistance funds are spent effectively.

Under the Compact, the United States has full authority and responsibility for security and defense of the Marshall Islands, and the Government of the Marshall Islands is obligated to refrain from taking actions that would be incompatible with these security and defense responsibilities.

The Department of Defense, under a subsidiary government-to-government agreement of the original Compact, has use of the lagoon and several islands on Kwajalein Atoll. The atoll consists of approximately 90 islets around the largest lagoon in the world. The original agreement allowed the United States continued use of the U.S. Army Garrison Kwajalein Atoll (USAG-KA), home to the Ronald Reagan Ballistic Missile Defense Test Site, until 2016. An amendment to that agreement, extending U.S. rights until 2066 with an option until 2086, was negotiated in conjunction with the Amended Compact. Another major subsidiary agreement of the original Compact provides for settlement of all claims arising from the U.S. nuclear tests conducted at Bikini and Enewetak Atolls from 1946 to 1958. Under the terms of free association, more than 40 U.S. Government agencies such as the Federal Aviation Administration, U.S. Postal Service, the Small Business Administration, and the Federal Emergency Management Agency operate programs or render assistance to the Marshall Islands.

In the United Nations, the Marshall Islands shows overwhelming support for the United States. In 2015, however, the Marshall Islands voted to condemn the US embargo over Cuba. The motion at the United Nations was supported by 191 member states, with two votes against (the United States and Israel) and no country abstaining. In December 2017, the Marshall Islands was one of just nine countries (including the United States and Israel) to vote against a motion adopted by the United Nations General Assembly condemning the United States' recognition of Jerusalem as the capital of Israel. The United States government had threatened to cut aid to states voting in favour of the motion.

The United States and the Marshall Islands have full diplomatic relations. The Marshall Islands has expressed an interest in attracting U.S. investment.

== Diplomatic missions ==
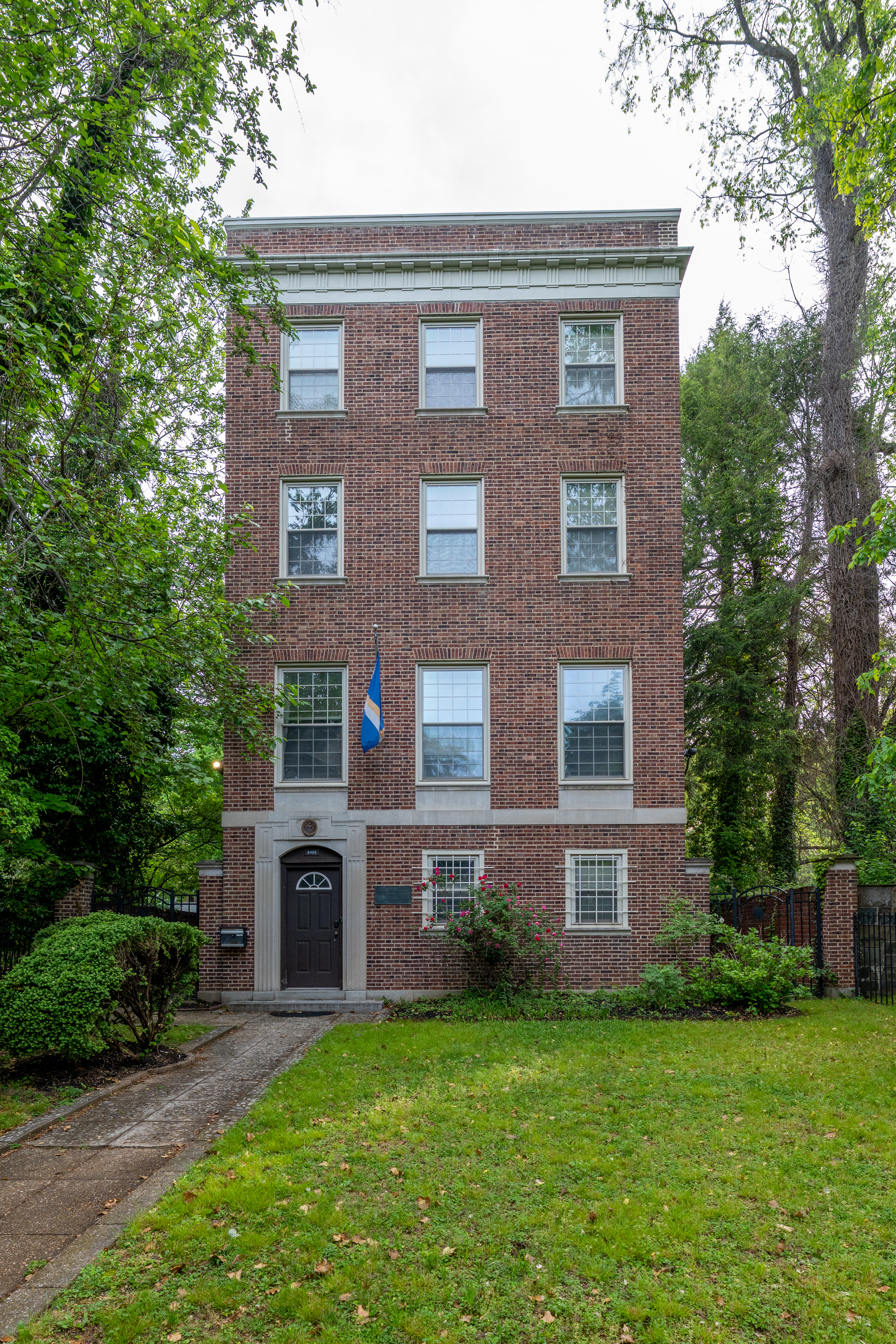
Embassy of the Marshall Islands in Washington D.C.

- Marshall Islands have an embassy in Washington, D.C. and consulates in Honolulu and Springdale.
- United States has an embassy in Majuro.

== Issues with Iran ==
On 28 April 2015 the Iranian navy seized the Marshall Island-flagged MV Maersk Tigris near the Strait of Hormuz. The ship had been charted by Germany's Rickmers ship management, who stated that the ship contained no special cargo including military weapons. The ship was reported to be under the control of the Iranian Revolutionary Guard according to the Pentagon amid escalating tensions in the region due to the intensifying of Saudi-led coalition attacks in Yemen. The Pentagon reported that the destroyer USS Farragut and a maritime reconnaissance aircraft were dispatched upon receiving a distress call from the ship Tigris and was also reported that all 34 crew members were detained. US defense officials have said that they would review their defense obligations to the Government of Marshall Islands in wake of the recent events and also condemned the shots fired at the bridge as "inappropriate". It was reported in May that Tehran would release the ship after a paid penalty.

== Wake Island dispute ==
The United States and the Marshall Islands governments both claim Wake Island, which puts the United States armed forces in the ambiguous position of defending US territory while acting as guarantor (under the Compact of Free Association) of the territorial integrity of a state with which it is involved in a territorial dispute. The United States claims Wake Island as an unorganized, unincorporated territory of the United States.
