= Israel–Marshall Islands relations =

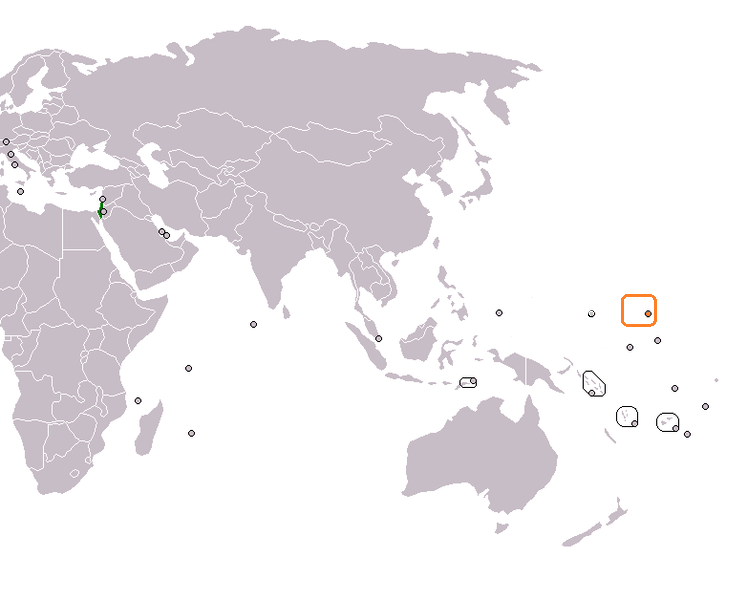

- Israel: Marshall Islands

Israel–Marshall Islands relations are diplomatic and other relations between Israel and the Marshall Islands.

== History ==
The Marshall Islands has established diplomatic relations with Israel since 1987, and has traditionally been a close voting ally of Israel at the United Nations. In July 1999, lauding the support of the Marshall Islands for supporting Israel in a UN vote, Congressman Benjamin Gilman of New York, Chair of the International Relations Committee of the US Congress described it saying: "Small nation... perhaps, but [its] courageous actions showed a sense of integrity greater than [its] size". On July 6, 2004, U.S. Representative Lacy Clay of Missouri said in the United States Congress that "The Marshall Islands has been ... a good friend to ... the State of Israel". Asked in 2004 why the Marshall Islands tend to support Israel in UN votes that are against Israel, Israel's Ambassador to the UN Dan Gillerman opined that they do it "because they believe is right — not because of their own interests."

Michael Ronen is the Israeli ambassador to thirteen Pacific Island nations, including the Marshall Islands. Ran Rahav serves as the Marshall Islands Honorary Consul in Israel. Charles T. Domnick is the Israel Honorary Consul in Marshall Islands.

In 2005, the Marshall Islands President, Kessai Hesa Note, visited Israel, asking for Israel's help in persuading the US to acknowledge responsibility for the damaging long-term effects of nuclear weapons testing on the people of the Marshall Islands. Accompanying President Note were Minister of Foreign Affairs of the Marshall Islands Gerald Zackios and Bikini Atoll Senator Tomaki Juda. During the visit, president Note thanked Israel for providing agricultural assistance and medical aid to the Marshall Islands and added, "We are proud to support the State of Israel as the vanguard of democracy in this region despite the constant acts of terrorism that have beset your great nation and people over the years".

In December 2017, the Marshall Islands was one of just nine countries (including the United States and Israel) to vote against a motion adopted by the United Nations General Assembly condemning the United States' recognition of Jerusalem as the capital of Israel.

== Trade and aid ==
In 1987, Marshall Islands purchased a water desalination facility from the Israeli company IDE Technologies, used to supply Ebeye Island. The facility is a 1,100 tonnes (1,100 long tons; 1,200 short tons) per day MED (Multiple-effect distillation) plant, operated using the excess heat of the Ebeye power plant. In 1992, Marshall Islands signed a letter of intent to purchase another desalination plant from Israel to supply Majuro with fresh water.

In 2002, a pilot poultry project was established in Laura village on Majuro Atoll, with Israeli support.

In 2003, the Israeli Ministry of Foreign Affairs Center for International Cooperation (MASHAV) supplied the Marshall Islands with experts on citrus crops and irrigation.

In June 2010, a team of Israeli ophthalmologists arrived in the Marshall Islands to perform cataract, oculoplastics and sight-restoring surgical operations. The mission was jointly organized by MASHAV and an Israeli NGO, Eye from Zion.

== See also ==
- International recognition of Israel
- Foreign relations of the Marshall Islands
- Foreign relations of Israel
