= Israel–Palau relations =

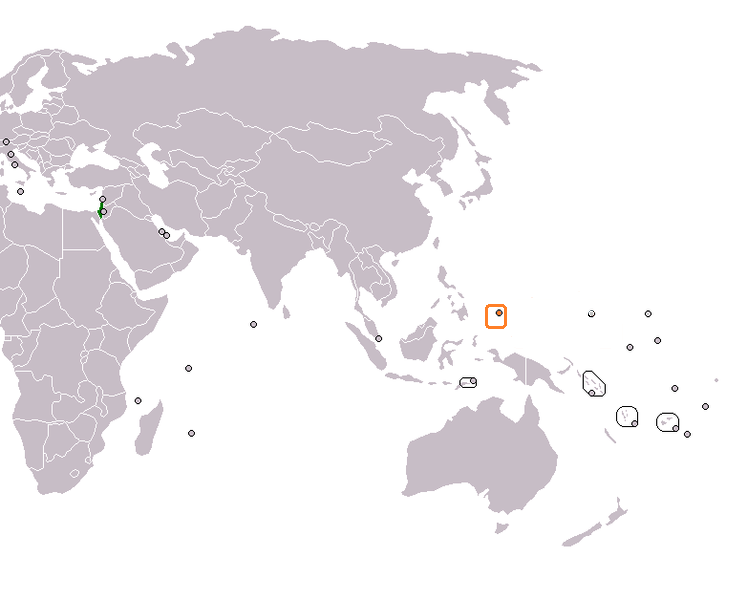
- Israel: Palau

Diplomatic mission
- Honorary consulate of Israel, Koror: Honorary consulate of Palau, Tel Aviv

Israel–Palau relations are the bilateral relations between the State of Israel and the Republic of Palau. Israel has an honorary consulate in Koror. Palau has an honorary consulate in Tel Aviv. There are less than 10 Jews living in Palau including one Israeli family.

Both countries cooperate on matters of agriculture, technology, and desalination.

== History ==
Israel was the first non-Pacific nation to declare diplomatic relations with Palau at its independence in 1994. Israel favored Palau's admission into the United Nations and offered economic aid to the young state. The Israeli Foreign Ministry has sent convoys of agricultural and fishing experts to Palau to help in training the local population.

As of 2006, Palau had the highest voting coincidence with Israel in the United Nations.

In 2006, President of Palau Thomas Remengesau Jr. visited Israel and held meetings with the Israeli Prime Minister Ehud Olmert and President Moshe Katsav. "We're the best of friends and we're here to reiterate that friendship", Remengesau said during the visit.

In December 2017, Palau was one of nine countries (including the United States and Israel) to vote against a motion adopted by the United Nations General Assembly condemning the United States' recognition of Jerusalem as the capital of Israel.

In October 2022, The Palauan permanent representative to the United Nations Ilana Seid was accredited as the Republic of Palau's ambassador to Israel, thus becoming the first official ambassador of Palau to Israel.

== See also ==
- History of the Jews in Palau
