= List of diplomatic missions in the Federated States of Micronesia =

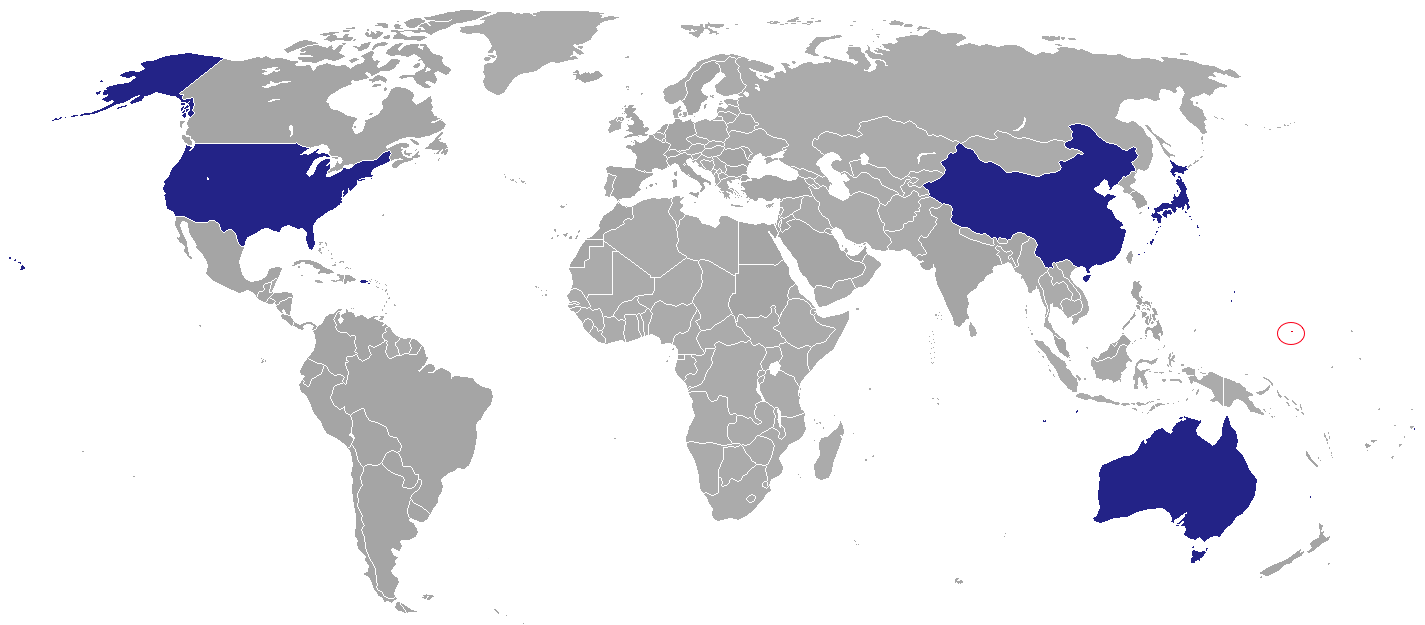
Diplomatic missions in the Federated States of Micronesia

This is a list of diplomatic missions in the Federated States of Micronesia. At present, the island of Pohnpei hosts 4 embassies. One of these (that of China) is located in the capital city of Palikir, while the other three are located in nearby Kolonia (which was formerly the capital and is still the island's largest town). Other countries have missions accredited from other capitals, mostly in Manila, Canberra, and Tokyo.

== Embassies ==
Palikir

- China

Kolonia

- Australia
- Japan
- United States

== Non-resident embassies ==
Resident in Manila, otherwise noted.

- Algeria (Canberra)
- Austria (Canberra)
- Côte d'Ivoire (Tokyo)
- Canada (Canberra)
- Colombia
- Czechia
- Germany
- Denmark (Singapore)
- Egypt (Tokyo)
- France
- Ghana (Washington, D.C.)
- Guinea (Tokyo)
- Guinea-Bissau (Beijing)
- Greece (Tokyo)
- Indonesia (Tokyo)
- Ireland
- Israel (Canberra)
- Jordan (Tokyo)
- South Korea (Suva)
- Kosovo (Tokyo)
- Laos (Tokyo)
- Mali (Tokyo)
- Malaysia (Suva)
- Maldives (Tokyo)
- Mexico
- Morocco
- Norway
- New Zealand (Honolulu)
- Portugal (Canberra)
- Papua New Guinea (Wellington)
- Philippines (Tokyo)
- Saudi Arabia (Tokyo)
- Sierra Leone (Seoul)
- Spain
- Switzerland
- Thailand
- Turkey (Tokyo)
- United Arab Emirates (Tokyo)
- United Kingdom (Suva)
- Vietnam (Beijing)
- Venezuela (Canberra)

== See also ==
- List of diplomatic missions of the Federated States of Micronesia
