= President of Palau =

Head of state and government

- Merredel er a Belau (Palauan)
- Government seal of the Republic of Palau

- Presidential standard of Palau

- Incumbent; Surangel Whipps Jr. since 21 January 2021
- Term length: Four years, renewable once consecutively
- Inaugural holder: Haruo Remeliik
- Formation: 2 March 1980
- Deputy: Vice President of Palau
- Salary: US$90,000 annually since 2010
- Website: http://palaugov.pw/

Chief of Staff
- Landisang Kotaro

The president of the Republic of Palau is the head of state and head of government of Palau. The president is directly elected to a four-year term, and can be reelected once in a consecutive manner.

== First Philippine Republic (1899–1902) ==
No.	Name	Portrait	Tenure start	Tenure end	Party
1	Emilio Aguinaldo (1869–1964)		January 23, 1899	April 19, 1901	None
-	Miguel Malvar (1865–1911)		April 19, 1901	April 16, 1902	None

== German New Guinea / Territory of New Guinea ==
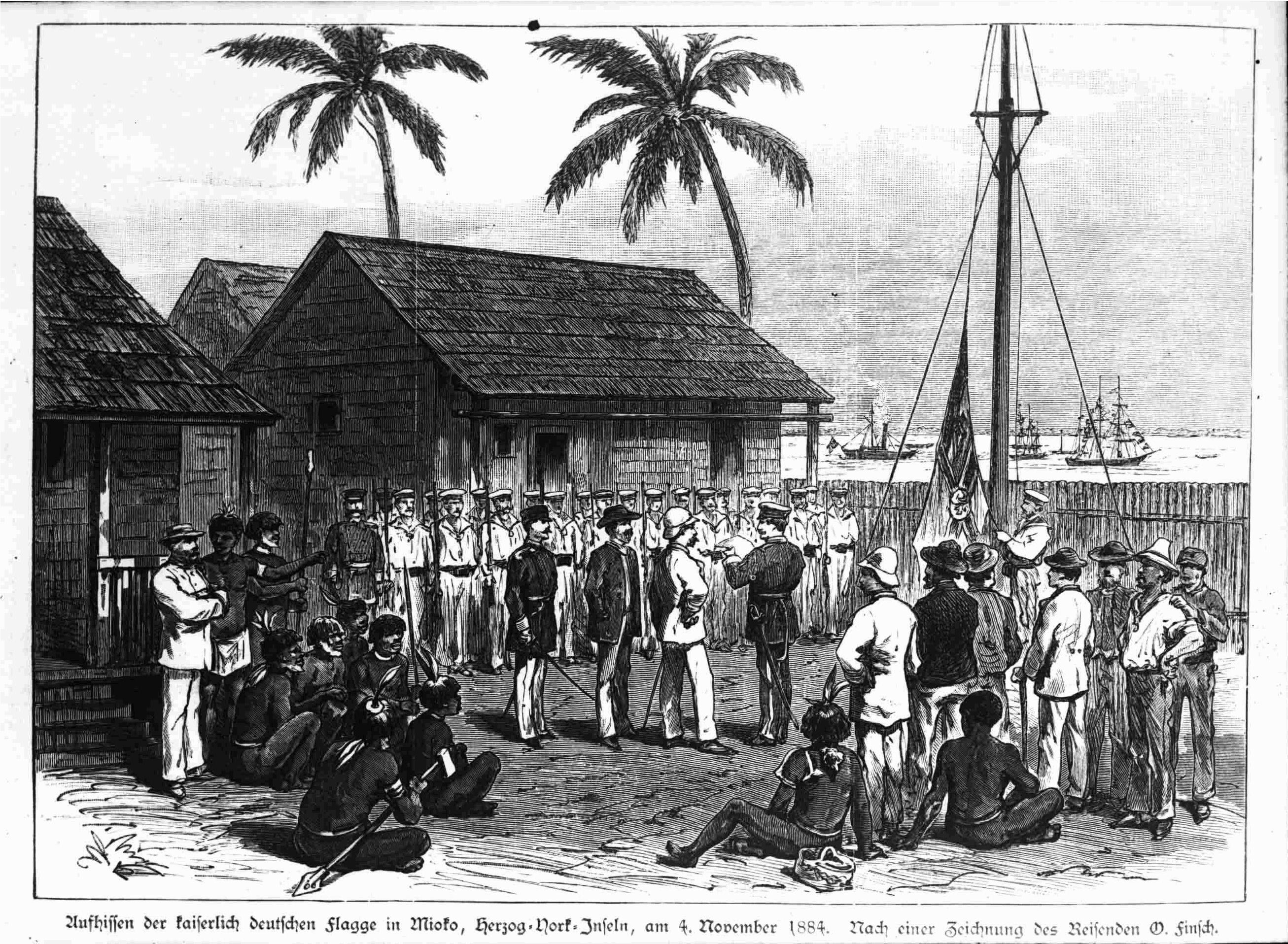
Hoisting the German flag on Mioko Island, Neulauenburg (now Duke of York Islands), Bismarck Archipelago on 4 November 1884.

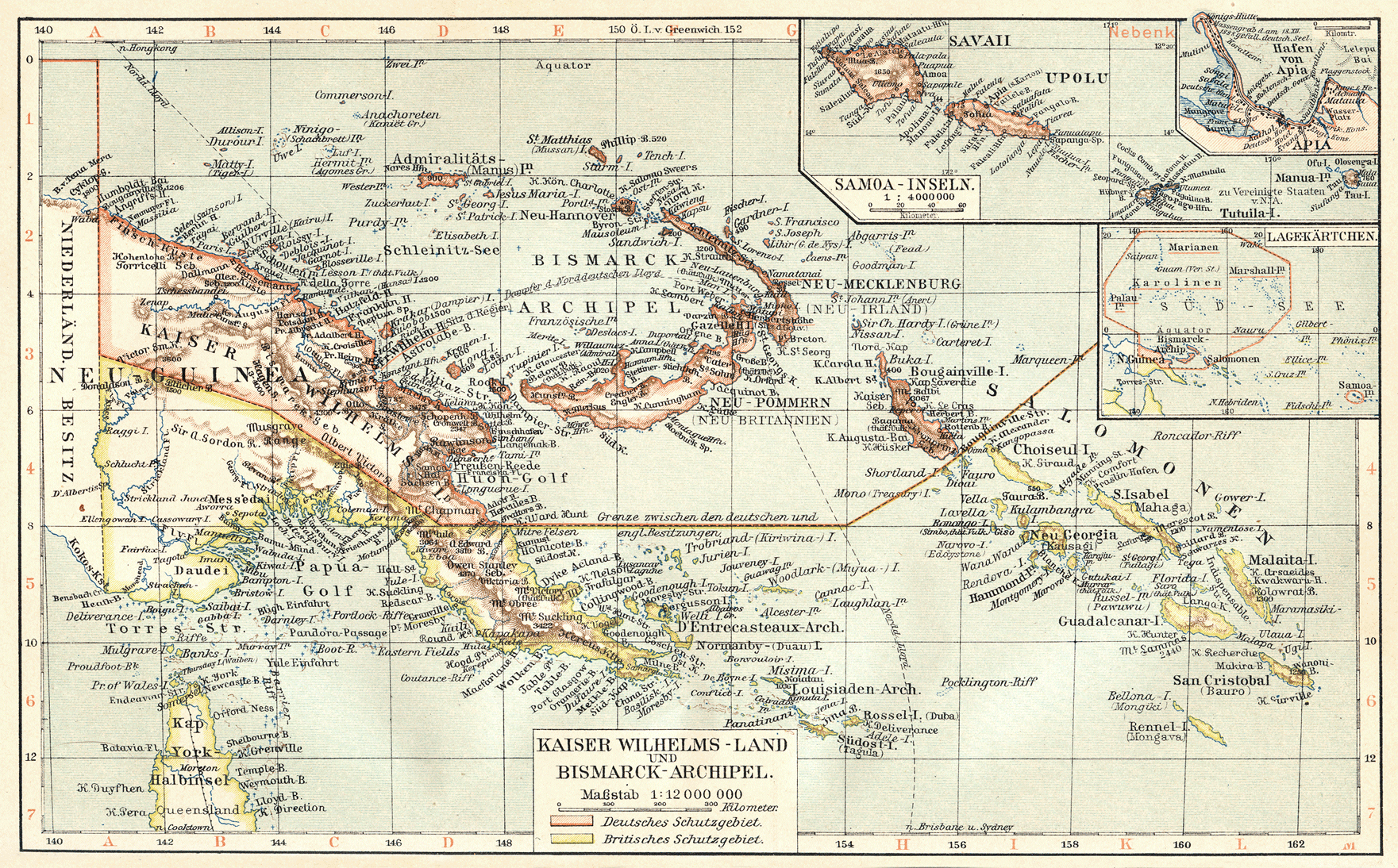
Kaiser-Wilhelmsland, the Bismarck Archipelago and the Samoan Islands (bordered in red), 1905.

The German colonial empire in the Pacific Ocean. German New Guinea is shown in brown.

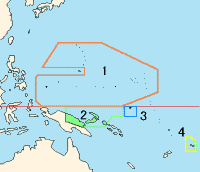
League of Nations mandates in the Pacific Ocean. The Territory of New Guinea (bordered in green) is number 2.

Tenure	Portrait	Incumbent	Notes
Commissioner of German New Guinea (1885–1887)
1885 to January 1887		Gustav von Oertzen	
Landeshauptleute of the German New Guinea Company (1886–1889)
10 June 1886 to 1 March 1888		Georg von Schleinitz	
1 March 1888 to 31 October 1889		Reinhold Kraetke	
Commissioner of German New Guinea (1889–1892)
1 November 1889 to 31 August 1892		Fritz Rose	Acting to 30 September 1890
Landeshauptleute of the German New Guinea Company (1892–1898)
1 September 1892 to 3 March 1895		Georg Schmiele	
3 March 1895 to 17 August 1896		Hugo Rüdiger	
22 September 1896 to 13 August 1897		Curt von Hagen	Died in office
15 August 1897 to 11 September 1897		Albert Hahl	First time, acting
11 September 1897 to 16 October 1898		Hugo Skopnik	Acting
In 1899, following the German–Spanish Treaty, the German Empire assumed direct control of the colony from the German New Guinea Company, appointing a governor.
Governors of German New Guinea (1899–1914)
1 April 1899 to 10 July 1901		Rudolf von Bennigsen	
10 July 1901 to 13 April 1914		Albert Hahl	Second time, acting to 10 November 1902
13 April 1914 to 17 October 1914		Eduard Haber	Acting
In 1914, as part of the Asian and Pacific theatre of World War I, an expeditionary force from Australia called the Australian Naval and Military Expeditionary Force (AN&MEF) captured and occupied the territory following the Battle of Bita Paka and the Siege of Toma. In 1920, the territory was turned into a League of Nations mandate, administered by Australia, and formalized with the passage of the New Guinea Act 1920.
Military Administrators of the Territory of New Guinea (1914–1921)
11 November 1914 to 8 January 1915		Colonel William Holmes	Killed in the Battle of Messines (1917)
8 January 1915 to 21 October 1917		Colonel Samuel Pethebridge	
21 October 1917 to 21 April 1918		Seaforth Simpson Mackenzie	Acting
21 April 1918 to 1 May 1920		George Johnston	
1 May 1920 to 21 March 1921		Thomas Griffiths	First time
Administrators of the Territory of New Guinea (1921–1942)
21 May 1921 to 13 June 1933		Evan Wisdom	
13 June 1933 to 12 September 1934		Thomas Griffiths	Second time, acting
12 September 1934 to December 1942		Walter McNicoll	From 14 December 1937, Sir Walter Ramsay McNicoll; in Australia from 24 January 1942
24 January 1942 to 12 February 1942		Kenneth Carlyle McMullen	Acting for McNicoll
Japanese Commanders of occupied New Guinea (1942–1945)
21 January 1942 to 1942		Tomitarō Horii	
9 November 1942 to 13 September 1945		Hatazō Adachi	Commander of the 18th Army
9 November 1942 to 6 September 1945		Hitoshi Imamura	Commander of the 8th Area Army, based at Rabaul, in charge of New Guinea islands
U.S. Military Commanders (1943–1944)
June 1943 to September 1944		Walter Krueger	Commander of the 6th Army
September 1944 to December 1944		Robert L. Eichelberger	Commander of the 8th Army
Heads of the New Guinea Administrative Unit (1942)
14 February 1942 to 15 February 1942		George Wilfred Lambert Townsend	Based in Port Moresby
15 February 1942 to 10 April 1942		Kenneth Carlyle McMullen	Based in Port Moresby

In 1945, the Territory of New Guinea was merged with the Territory of Papua to form the Territory of Papua and New Guinea. The merger was formalized with the passage of the Papua and New Guinea Act 1949.

== List of officeholders ==
The following is a list of the governors the South Seas Mandate, as well as their predecessors during the Japanese occupation of the territory between 1914 and 1922.

(Dates in italics indicate de facto continuation of office.)

No.	Portrait	Name (Birth–Death)	Term of office		
No.	Portrait	Name (Birth–Death)	Took office	Left office	Time in office
臨時南洋群島防備隊司令官 (Rinji nan'yō guntō bōbi-tai shirei-kan) (Commander of the Interim Southern Islands Defense Unit)
1		Matsumura Tatsuo (1868–1932)	28 December 1914	6 August 1915	221 days
2		Tōgō Kichitarō (1867–1942)	6 August 1915	1 December 1916	1 year, 117 days
3		Yoshida Masujirō (1867–1942)	1 December 1916	1 December 1917	1 year
4		Nagata Yasujirō (1867–1923)	1 December 1917	1 December 1919	2 years
5		Kojūrō Nozaki (1872–1946)	1 December 1919	1 April 1922	2 years, 121 days
南洋庁民政部長 (Nan'yō-chō minsei buchō) (Director of the Department of Civil Affairs of the South Sea Agency)
6		Toshiro Tezuka (1873–1933)	1 July 1918	1 April 1922	3 years, 274 days
南洋庁長官 (Nan'yō-chō chōkan) (Director of the South Sea Agency)
(6)		Toshiro Tezuka (1873–1933)	1 April 1922	4 April 1923	1 year, 3 days
7		Gosuke Yokota (1880–1931)	4 April 1923	11 October 1931 †	8 years, 190 days
–		Mitsusada Horiguchi (1881–1939)	12 October 1931	21 November 1931	40 days
8		Kazuo Tahara (1887–1955)	21 November 1931	5 February 1932	76 days
9		Baron Masayuki Matsuda (1892–1976)	5 February 1932	4 August 1933	1 year, 180 days
10		Hisao Hayashi (1881–1963)	4 August 1933	19 September 1936	3 years, 46 days
11		Kenjiro Kitajima (1893–1957)	19 September 1936	9 April 1940	3 years, 203 days
12		Shunsuke Kondo (1890–1966)	9 April 1940	5 November 1943	3 years, 210 days
13		Boshirō Hosogaya (1888–1964)	5 November 1943	2 September 1945 (Note: Nominally to 12 March 1946.)	1 year, 301 days

== List of officeholders ==
The following is a list of the high commissioner of the Trust Territory of the Pacific Islands, as well as their predecessors during the American occupation of the territory between 1944 and 1947.

(Dates in italics indicate de facto continuation of office)

No.	Portrait	Name (Birth–Death)	Term of office		
No.	Portrait	Name (Birth–Death)	Took office	Left office	Time in office
United States Navy control
Military Governor
1		John H. Hoover (1887–1970)	March 1944	19 June 1944	3 months
Military Governor and CINCPACFLT
2		Chester W. Nimitz (1885–1966)	19 June 1944	24 November 1945	1 year, 158 days
3		Raymond A. Spruance (1885–1969)	24 November 1945	3 February 1946	71 days
4		John H. Towers (1885–1955)	3 February 1946	28 February 1947	1 year, 25 days
5		Louis E. Denfeld (1891–1972)	28 February 1947	18 July 1947	140 days
Trust Territory of the Pacific Islands
High Commissioner and CINCPACFLT
1 (Note: Numbering restarted for civil (rather than military) office.)		Louis E. Denfeld (1891–1972)	18 July 1947	17 April 1948	274 days
2		DeWitt Clinton Ramsey (1888–1961)	17 April 1948	1 May 1949	1 year, 14 days
3		Arthur W. Radford (1896–1973)	1 May 1949	6 January 1951	1 year, 250 days
High Commissioner
4		Elbert D. Thomas (1883–1953)	6 January 1951	11 February 1953 †	2 years, 36 days
5		Frank E. Midkiff (1887–1983)	13 March 1953	1 September 1954	1 year, 172 days
–		Delmas H. Nucker (1907–1985)	1 September 1954	November 1956	6 years, 242 days
6		Delmas H. Nucker (1907–1985)	November 1956	1 May 1961	6 years, 242 days
7		Maurice W. Goding (1911–1989)	1 May 1961	27 May 1966	5 years, 26 days
–		William R. Norwood (1909–1981)	27 May 1966	1 August 1966	2 years, 339 days
8		William R. Norwood (1909–1981)	1 August 1966	1 May 1969	2 years, 339 days
9		Edward E. Johnston (1918–2011)	1 May 1969	1 July 1976	7 years, 61 days
–		Peter Tali Coleman (1919–1997)	1 July 1976	February 1977	7 months
–		James Boyd Mackenzie (1918–1978)	February 1977	9 July 1977	5 months
10		Adrian P. Winkel (1915–1994)	9 July 1977	1981	3–4 years
–		Daniel Joseph High (born 1938)	1981	December 1981	0 years
11		Janet J. McCoy (1916–1995)	December 1981	10 July 1987	5 years, 7 months
Director of the Office of Transition
12		Charles D. Jordan	3 November 1986	30 September 1991	4 years, 331 days

== List of officeholders ==
No.	Portrait	Name(Birth–Death)	Elected	Term of office			Political party
No.	Portrait	Name(Birth–Death)	Elected	Took office	Left office	Time in office	Political party
—		Ngirngetpak Tosiwo Nakamura (1938–2003)	1980	2 March 1980	2 March 1981	0 days	Independent
1		Haruo Remeliik (1933–1985)	1980; 1984	2 March 1981	30 June 1985 (Assassinated)	4 years, 120 days	Independent
—		Thomas Remengesau Sr. (1929–2019); Acting President	—	30 June 1985	2 July 1985	2 days	Independent
2		Alfonso Oiterong (1924–1994)	—	2 July 1985	25 October 1985	115 days	Independent
3		Lazarus Salii (1936–1988)	1985	25 October 1985	20 August 1988 (Suicide)	2 years, 300 days	Independent
4		Thomas Remengesau Sr. (1929–2019)	—	20 August 1988	1 January 1989	134 days	Independent
5		Ngiratkel Etpison (1925–1997)	1988	1 January 1989	1 January 1993	4 years	Independent
6		Kuniwo Nakamura (1943–2020)	1992; 1996	1 January 1993	1 January 2001	8 years	Independent
7		Thomas Remengesau Jr. (born 1956)	2000; 2004	1 January 2001	15 January 2009	8 years, 14 days	Independent
8		Johnson Toribiong (born 1946)	2008	15 January 2009	17 January 2013	4 years, 2 days	Independent
9		Thomas Remengesau Jr. (born 1956)	2012; 2016	17 January 2013	21 January 2021	8 years, 4 days	Independent
10		Surangel S. Whipps Jr. (born 1968)	2020; 2024	21 January 2021	Incumbent	5 years, 272 days	Independent

== See also ==
- First Lady of Palau
- Vice President of Palau
- High Commissioner of the Trust Territory of the Pacific Islands
