= 1980 Palauan general election =

4 November 1980	1984 →
- Presidential election
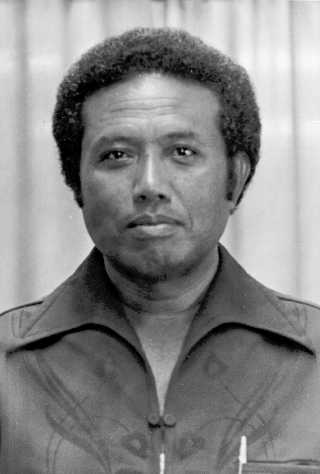

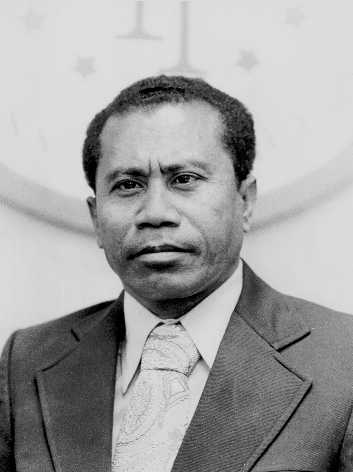
Candidate	Haruo Remeliik	Roman Tmetuchl
Party	Independent	Independent
Popular vote	1,955	1,608
Percentage	31.20%	25.66%
High Commissioner before election
Adrian P. Winkel
Independent
Elected President
Haruo Remeliik
Independent
- Vice-presidential election
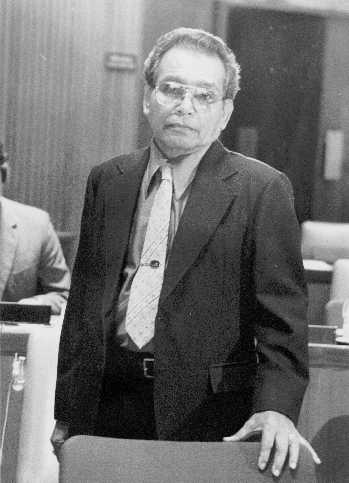

Candidate	Alfonso Oiterong	Tosiwo Nakamura
Party	Independent	Independent
Popular vote	1,953	1,706
Percentage	31.84%	27.81%
Elected Vice-President
Alfonso Oiterong
Independent
- Senate election
- All 18 seats in the Senate; 10 seats needed for a majority
Party	Vote %	Seats
Independents	100	18
This lists parties that won seats. See the complete results below.
- House election
- All 16 seats in the House of Delegates; 9 seats needed for a majority
Party	Vote %	Seats
Independents	100	16
This lists parties that won seats. See the complete results below.

General elections were held in Palau on 4 November 1980 to elect a president, vice-president, Senate and House of Delegates. All candidates ran as independents. Haruo Remeliik won the election for president with 31.2% of the vote, whilst Alfonso Oiterong was elected vice-president. Voter turnout was 80%.

== Results ==
=== President ===
Candidate	Votes	%
Haruo Remeliik	1,955	31.20
Roman Tmetuchl	1,608	25.66
Lazarus Salii	1,453	23.19
John Ngiraked	992	15.83
David Ramarui	258	4.12
Total	6,266	100.00
Valid votes	6,266	97.53
Invalid/blank votes	159	2.47
Total votes	6,425	100.00
Registered voters/turnout	8,032	79.99
Source: Nohlen et al.

=== Vice-President ===
Candidate	Votes	%
Alfonso Oiterong	1,953	31.84
Tosiwo Nakamura	1,706	27.81
Isidoro Rudimch	1,364	22.24
Raymond Ulochong	567	9.24
Haruo Willter	544	8.87
Total	6,134	100.00
Valid votes	6,134	95.47
Invalid/blank votes	291	4.53
Total votes	6,425	100.00
Registered voters/turnout	8,032	79.99
Source: Nohlen et al.

=== Senate ===
Party	Votes	%	Seats
Independents	6,266	100.00	18
Total	6,266	100.00	18
Valid votes	6,266	97.53	
Invalid/blank votes	159	2.47	
Total votes	6,425	100.00	
Registered voters/turnout	8,032	79.99	
Source: Nohlen et al., PIM

=== House of Delegates ===
Party	Votes	%	Seats
Independents	6,266	100.00	16
Total	6,266	100.00	16
Valid votes	6,266	97.53	
Invalid/blank votes	159	2.47	
Total votes	6,425	100.00	
Registered voters/turnout	8,032	79.99	
Source: Nohlen et al., PIM

==== Elected Congress members ====
Senate
Constituency	Member
Aimeliik, Ngatpang, Ngaremlengui and Ngardmau	Lucius Malsol
Aimeliik, Ngatpang, Ngaremlengui and Ngardmau	Masami Siksei
Airai	Baules Sechelong
Kayangel and Ngarchelong	Olkeriil Rehuher
Kayangel and Ngarchelong	Hank Takawo
Koror	Joshua Koshiba
Koror	Kuniwo Nakamura
Koror	Peter Sugiyama
Koror	Johnson Toribiong
Koror	Edward Temengil
Koror	Kaleb Udui
Koror	Moses Uludong
Ngaraard	David Ngirmidol
Ngaraard	John Tarkong, Snr
Ngeaur, Tobi and Sonsorol	Abel Suzuki
Ngiwal, Melekeok and Ngchesar	Seit Andres
Ngiwal, Melekeok and Ngchesar	George Ngirarsaol
Peleliu	Miichungi Solang
House of Delegates
Aimeliik	Tern Obakerbau
Airai	Mengiraro Ngiratechekii
Kayangel	Kambalang Olebuu
Koror	Santos Olikong
Melekeok	Kazuo Asanuma
Ngaraard	Laurentino Ulechong
Ngarchelong	Johnny Reklai
Ngardmau	Akiko Sugiyama
Ngatpang	Demei Otobed
Ngchesar	Ignacio Anastacio
Ngeaur	Carlos Salii
Ngeremlengui	Blau Skebong
Ngiwal	Hideo Termeteet
Peleliu	Takeshi Kintol
Sonsorol	Mariano Carlos
Tobi	Pablo Kyoshi
Source: Pacific Islands Monthly

== Aftermath ==
Following the elections, Haruo Remeliik and Alfonso Oiterong were sworn in as president and vice president on 1 January 1981. Kaleb Udui was elected president of the Senate, with Carlos Salii elected Speaker of the House of Delegates.
