= First Lady of Palau =

Wife of the president of Palau

- Flag of Palau

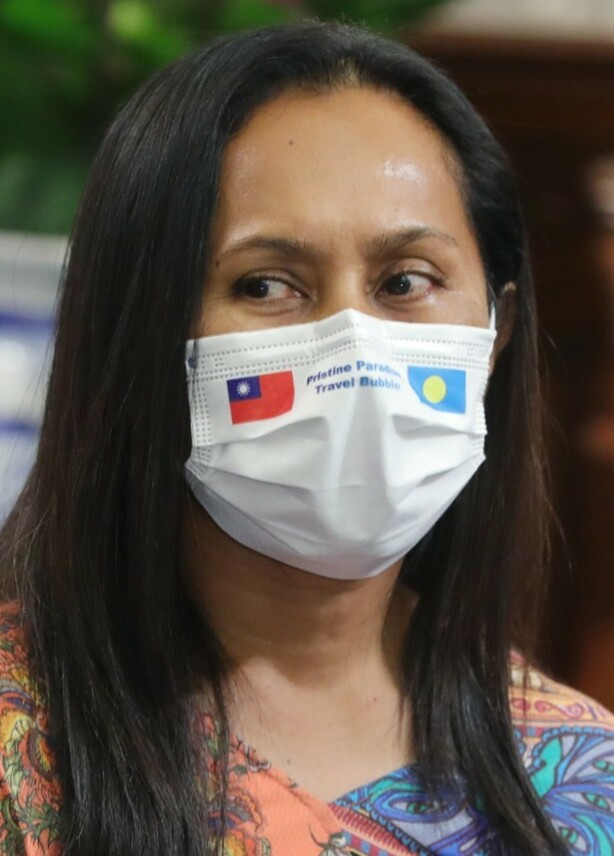
- Incumbent; Valerie Whipps since 21 January 2021
- Inaugural holder: Regina Remeliik
- Formation: 2 March 1981

First Lady of Palau is the official title attributed to the wife of the president of Palau. The country's current first lady is Valerie Whipps, wife of President Surangel Whipps Jr., who had held the position since 21 January 2021.

== First ladies of Palau ==
| Name | Portrait | Term Began | Term Ended | President | Notes |
|---|---|---|---|---|---|
| Regina Namiko Remeliik | | 2 March 1981 | 30 June 1985 | Haruo Remeliik | Born Regina Blaires, she worked a nurse and teacher before becoming the inaugural First Lady of Palau. President Remeliik was assassinated on June 30, 1985. |
| Ferista Esang Remengesau | | 30 June 1985 | 2 July 1985 | Thomas Remengesau Sr. | Served as First Lady during both her husband's short tenures. Esang Remengesau was also the mother of President Tommy Remengesau. |
| Josepha Oiterong | | 2 July 1985 | 25 October 1985 | Alfonso Oiterong | |
| Christina Salii | | 25 October 1985 | 20 August 1988 | Lazarus Salii | Known as Tina Salii, she was First Lady from 1985 until President Salii's death in office in 1988. In 2007, Salii was named Dilbuked of Ngerchedok Clan of Ngebuked village in Ngaraard state, the counterpart to the traditional male chiefs. Salii and the late president are the parents of Kathleen M. Salii, the first female Palauan justice of the Supreme Court of Palau. |
| Ferista Esang Remengesau | | 20 August 1988 | 1 January 1989 | Thomas Remengesau Sr. | Ferista Esang Remengesau's second tenure as First Lady of Palau. |
| Rolmii Rurung Spis Ebilruluked | | 1 January 1989 | 1 January 1993 | Ngiratkel Etpison | Ebilruluked and Etpison merried before 1945. |
| Elong Nakamura | | 1 January 1993 | 1 January 2001 | Kuniwo Nakamura | Former First Lady Elong Ebiledil Nakamura died on November 17, 2018, at the age of 74. |
| Debbie Remengesau | | 1 January 2001 | 15 January 2009 | Tommy Remengesau Jr. | Remengesau's first tenure as first lady. |
| Valeria Toribiong | | 15 January 2009 | 17 January 2013 | Johnson Toribiong | |
| Debbie Remengesau | | 17 January 2013 | 21 January 2021 | Tommy Remengesau Jr. | Second tenure as first lady, beginning in January 2013 and sister-in-law of Valerie Whipps. |
| Valerie Whipps | | 21 January 2021 | Present | Surangel Whipps Jr. | The Sister of Former President.Tommy Remengesau Jr. |
