= Ministry of Justice (Palau) =

Government ministry in Palau

The Ministry of Justice in Palau is part of the Executive Branch and consists of the following bureaus:

- Office of the Attorney General
- Bureau of Immigration
- Bureau of Public Safety
- Division of Criminal Investigation/Drug Enforcement
- Division of Patrol
- Division of Fire & Rescue
- Division of Corrections
- Division of Marine Law Enforcement
- Division of Fish & Wildlife Protection

== List of ministers of justice ==
Name	Took office	Left office	President	Notes
Thomas Remengesau Sr.	1981	1 January 1989	Haruo Remeliik; Alfonso Oiterong; Lazarus Salii	1st Minister of Justice
Ngiratkel Etpison	1 January 1989	1992	Ngiratkel Etpison	No justice minister appointed
Kuniwo Nakamura	1992	1 January 1993	Ngiratkel Etpison	
Salvador Ingereklii	1993	1997	Kuniwo Nakamura	
Elias Camsek Chin	1997	1 January 2001	Kuniwo Nakamura	
Michael J. Rosenthal	2001	2004	Thomas Remengesau Jr.	
Elias Camsek Chin	2004	15 January 2009	Thomas Remengesau Jr.	
John C. Gibbons	2009	17 January 2013	Johnson Toribiong	
Antonio Bells	2013	2017	Thomas Remengesau Jr.	
Raynold Oilouch	2017	21 January 2021	Thomas Remengesau Jr.	
Uduch Sengebau Senior	July 2021	16 January 2025	Surangel Whipps Jr.	
Jennifer Olegeriil	May 2025		Surangel Whipps Jr.	
