= Haruo =

- Gender: Male

Origin
- Origin: Japanese
- Meaning: Different meanings depending on the kanji used

Haruo (written: 春雄, 春生, 春男, 春夫, 晴生, 晴男, 晴夫, 暎夫, 治夫 or 治夫) is a masculine Japanese given name. Notable people with the name include:

== From Japan ==
- Haruo Arima (有馬 暎夫), Japanese footballer
- Haruo Hosoya (細矢 治夫; born 1936), Japanese chemist
- Haruo Inoue (井上 春生; born 1963), Japanese film director
- Haruo Maekawa (前川 春雄; 1911–1989), Japanese businessman and banker
- Haruo Minami (三波 春夫; 1923–2001), Japanese singer
- Haruo Nakajima (中島 春雄; born 1929), Japanese actor
- Haruo Oka (岡 晴夫; 1916–1970), Japanese singer
- Haruo Satō (novelist) (佐藤 春夫; 1892–1964), Japanese novelist
- Haruo Satō (voice actor) (佐藤 晴男; born 1961), Japanese voice actor
- Haruo Sato (water polo) (佐藤 晴雄; born 1945), Japanese water polo player
- Haruo Sotozaki (外崎春雄), Japanese director
- Haruo Suekichi (末吉 晴男), Japanese watchmaker
- Haruo Takeuchi, Japanese Paralympic athlete
- Haruo Tanaka (田中 春男; 1912–1992), Japanese actor
- Haruo Tomiyama (富山 治夫; born 1935), Japanese photographer
- Haruo Urata (浦田 春生; born 1962), Japanese long-distance runner
- Haruo Wakō (和光 晴生; born 1949), Japanese militant
- Haruo Yasuda (安田 春雄; born 1943), Japanese golfer
- Haruo Yoshimuta (吉無田 春男; 1939–2025), Japanese swimmer

== From Palau ==
- Haruo Remeliik, First President of Palau
- Haruo Willter, First Minister of Administration of Palau
