= Franz Reksid =

Franz Benjamin Reksid

Minister of Administration of Palau
- In office 1986 – January 1989
- President: Lazarus Salii; Thomas Remengesau Sr.
- Preceded by: Haruo Willter
- Succeeded by: Kuniwo Nakamura

Franz Reksid is a Palauan civil servant and politician, former Minister of Administration of Palau, and former official in Northern Mariana Islands government.

He was health services administrator of Trust Territory of the Pacific Islands in Saipan, Marianas, in 1970s and 1980s.

Reksid was appointed as Minister of Administration of Palau by President Lazarus Salii in 1986, and was confirmed by Senate of Palau. In this role he was responsible for public finances of Palau. He left the position when Thomas Remengesau Sr. left office in January 1989. In 1990s he was special assistant to the Governor of Northern Mariana Islands.

Later he worked as department of public lands official in Northern Mariana Islands government. He was responsible for managing department of public lands contracts with funding provided from United States Environmental Protection Agency grants from 2007 to 2009. He was found guilty for accepting bribes in 2011.

He was 70 years old in 2011, so he was born in about 1940–1942.
