= Haruo Willter =

Palauan politician

Haruo Ngiraked Willter

Minister of Administration of Palau
- In office 1981 – October 1985
- President: Haruo Remeliik; Alfonso Oiterong
- Preceded by: Position established
- Succeeded by: Franz Reksid

Haruo Ngiraked Willter is a Palauan civil servant and politician, and former Minister of Administration of Palau responsible for public finances.

== Biography ==
Willter served in multiple positions throughout the decades including several years in Koror as deputy director of the Trust Territory of the Pacific Islands (TTPI) office. He began his employment with the TTPI government in Guam in 1958, and spent years in finance and budget positions after the TTPI moved to Saipan.

Willter was a delegate in the first 1979 Palauan constitutional convention, and also in the second 2005 constitutional convention.

He was Minister of Administration in the government of Palau in the early 1980s, from to 1981 to October 1985 during the presidencies of Haruo Remeliik and Alfonso Oiterong. Willter run as a candidate for Vice President of Palau in the 1980 elections and the 1985 elections. He was described to have a narrow political base, and was not elected. He then served as a personal envoy of President Lazarus Salii.

From 1990 to 2008, he worked with the Office of Insular Affairs in Palau, and oversaw special projects in Palau, Federated States of Micronesia and Marshall Islands. Willter later joined the administration of Johnson Toribiong.

Willter was forty-eight years old in 1985, so he was born in 1930s.
