= Debbie Remengesau =

The Honorable Debbie Remengesau
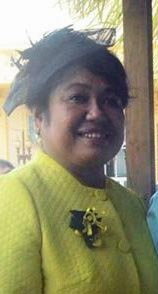
- Remengesau at her husbands inauguration in 2017

First Lady of Palau
- In office 17 January 2013 – 21 January 2021
- President: Thomas Remengesau Jr.
- Preceded by: Valeria Toribiong
- Succeeded by: Valerie Whipps
- In office 1 January 2001 – 15 January 2009
- Preceded by: Elong Nakamura
- Succeeded by: Valeria Toribiong

Personal details
- Spouse: Thomas Remengesau Jr.
- Children: 4

Debbie Remengesau was the First Lady of Palau from 2001 to 2009, and then from 2013 to 2021 as the wife of President Thomas Remengesau Jr.

== Biography ==
Debbie Remengesau is the wife of Thomas Remengesau Jr. and the mother of their four children. She travelled to Guam in 2015 for the Festival of Pacific Arts. As first lady she promoted marine conservation.
