= John Ngiraked =

Palauan politician (1932–2003)

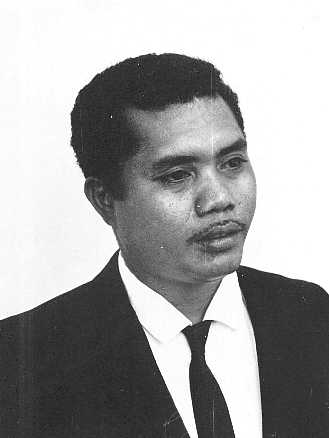
- Ngiraked in 1965

President of Senate of Micronesian Congress
- In office July 1967 – 1969
- Preceded by: Tosiwo Nakayama
- Succeeded by: Amata Kabua
- In office July 1965 – July 1965
- Preceded by: Position established
- Succeeded by: Tosiwo Nakayama

Personal details
- Born: John Obeldabl Ngiraked; 1932 Ngiwal, South Seas Mandate (present day Palau)
- Died: 2003 (aged 70–71)

John Obeldabl Ngiraked (1932–2003) was a Palauan politician and criminal who led the Micronesian Senate of the Congress and helped to conspire the assassination of President Haruo Remeliik of Palau.

== Early life and career ==
John Obeldabl Ngiraked was born 1932 in Ngiwal, then part of the South Seas Mandate. He was born into the Udes clan. He attended George Washington High School in Guam. Fluent in both English and Japanese, Ngiraked was a senior interpreter and translator for the Palau Administration before becoming a district prosecutor, and then a law clerk, for the Office of the Attorney General. He was appointed a member of the Palau District Advisory Council from 1955 to 1956.

== Congress of Micronesia ==
Ngiraked was elected in 1965 to the Congress of Micronesia. He was elected as the president of the upper chamber in July 1965, but was replaced by Tosiwo Nakayama in the same month. He was re-elected as president again from July 1967 to 1969. Roman Tmetuchl was his political rival for a senate seat in the 1970 elections to the Congress of Micronesia.

== Palauan political career ==
Ngiraked ran unsuccessfully for the presidency of Palau in the elections of 1980, but lost to Haruo Remeliik. In 1984, before Remeliik's reelection, Ngiraked declared that Remeliik's government was in despair and called on the president to resign. Remeliik was assassinated in June 1985.

Ngiraked was appointed and confirmed as the Minister of State of Lazarus Salii from 1985 to 1988. He acknowledged his involvement in the three months of violence in Palau in 1987. He unsuccessfully tried to acquire the Ta Belau party nomination for President to succeed Lazarus Salii in 1988. He ran again unsuccessfully for the presidency of Palau in the 1988 elections without Ta Belau backing.

In March 1993, after findings of a special prosecutor, and a trial, Ngiraked and his wife were found guilty of aiding and abetting the assassination of President Remeliik in June 1985. In March 2000, he claimed responsibility for the conspiracy to kill Remeliik.

Ngiraked was the author of Heritage Belau (1999).
