= 1985 Palauan presidential election =

- 28 August 1985
- Presidential election
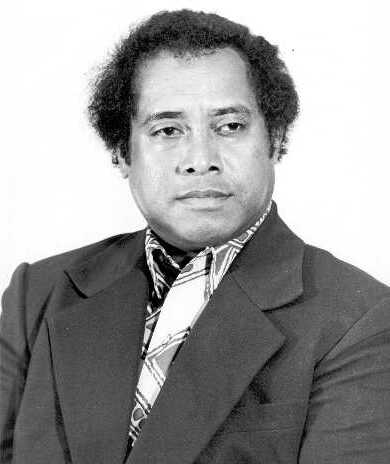

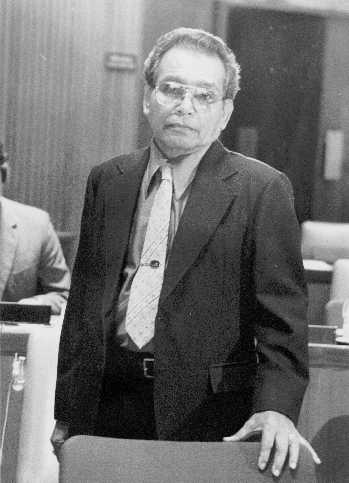
Candidate	Lazarus Salii	Alfonso Oiterong
Party	Independent	Independent
Popular vote	4,077	3,484
Percentage	53.22%	45.48%
President before election
Alfonso Oiterong
Independent
Elected President
Lazarus Salii
Independent
- Vice presidential election
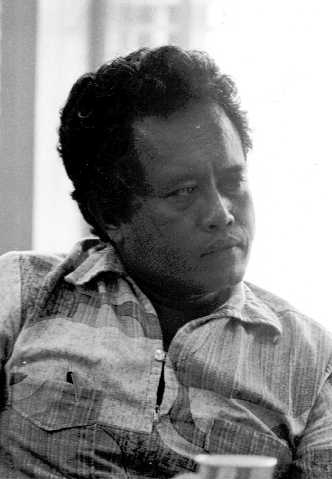

Candidate	Thomas Remengesau Sr.	Tosiwo Namamura	Kazuo Asanuma
Party	Independent	Independent	Independent
Popular vote	1,968	1,353	1,168
Percentage	25.94%	17.84%	15.40%
Candidate	Joshua Koshiba	Sadang Silmai	Haruo Willter
Party	Independent	Independent	Independent
Popular vote	1,152	901	756
Percentage	15.19%	11.88%	9.97%
Vice President before election
Alfonso Oiterong
Independent
Elected Vice President
Thomas Remengesau Sr.
Independent

Presidential elections were held in Palau on 28 August 1985 to elect a president and vice-president, following the assassination of Haruo Remeliik on 30 June. Lazarus Salii won the election for president, defeating interim President Alfonso Oiterong, whilst Thomas Remengesau, Sr. was elected vice-president. Voter turnout was 79.1%.

== Results ==
=== President ===
Candidate	Votes	%
Lazarus Salii	4,077	53.22
Alfonso Oiterong	3,484	45.48
Write-ins	99	1.29
Total	7,660	100.00
Valid votes	7,660	99.51
Invalid/blank votes	38	0.49
Total votes	7,698	100.00
Registered voters/turnout	9,735	79.08
Source: Nohlen et al.

=== Vice-President ===
Candidate	Votes	%
Thomas Remengesau, Sr.	1,968	25.94
Tosiwo Namamura	1,353	17.84
Kazuo Asanuma	1,168	15.40
Joshua Koshiba	1,152	15.19
Sadang Silmai	901	11.88
Haruo Willter	756	9.97
John Tarkong	275	3.63
Write-ins	13	0.17
Total	7,586	100.00
Valid votes	7,586	98.55
Invalid/blank votes	112	1.45
Total votes	7,698	100.00
Registered voters/turnout	9,735	79.08
Source: Nohlen et al.
