= Haruto =

- Pronunciation: Ha-ru-to
- Gender: Male

Origin
- Origin: Japanese
- Meaning: It can have many different meanings depending on the kanji used.

Other names
- Related names: Haruo

Haruto (はると, ハルト) is a very popular masculine Japanese given name.

== Written forms ==
Haruto can be written using different kanji characters and can mean:

- 春人, "spring, person"
- 春大, "spring, big"
- 春斗, "spring, dipper"
- 晴人, "sunny/clear up, person"
- 晴斗, "sunny/clear up, dipper"
- 治人, "govern, person"
- 陽斗, "sun/yang, dipper"
- 遥都, "distant, city"

The name can also be written in hiragana or katakana.

== People ==
- Haruto Kō (耕 治人; 1906–1988), Japanese poet and novelist
- Haruto Shirai (白井 陽斗; born 1999), Japanese football player
- Haruto Takahashi (髙橋 遥人; born 1995), Japanese baseball player
- Haruto Umezawa (梅澤 春人; born 1966), Japanese manga artist
- Haruto Watanabe (渡辺 温斗; born 2004), Japanese singer, member of South Korean band Treasure
- Haruto Yasumoto (安本 晴翔; born 2000), Japanese kickboxer

== Characters ==
- Haruto (ハルト), a character in the console role-playing game Suikoden IV
- Haruto (春人), a character in the manga series Code:Breaker
- Haruto Asou (遥都), a character in Japanese television drama 1 Litre no Namida
- Haruto Fuwa (春斗), a character in the light novel series A Sister's All You Need
- Haruto Houjou (遥都), the main character in the manga and anime series Haunted Junction
- Haruto Kaguragi (晴), a character in the manga series Boys Over Flowers Season 2
- Haruto Kawai (春人), a character in the Japanese romance visual novel Memories Off 5 The Unfinished Film
- Haruto Kirishima (青大), the main character in the manga and the anime A Town Where You Live
- Haruto Kurosaki (晴人), a character in the manga series Kurosaki-kun no Iinari ni Nante Naranai
- Haruto Kurosawa (遥人), a character in the manga and anime series Coppelion
- Haruto Saionji (春人), a character in the action role-playing game Shining Wind and anime series Shining Tears X Wind
- Haruto Sakaki (晴人), a character in the anime series Witch Hunter Robin
- Haruto Sakuraba (春人), a character in the manga series Eyeshield 21
- Haruto Sawamura, a character in the video game series Yakuza (franchise)
- Haruto Sohma (晴人), the main character in Kamen Rider Wizard
- Haruto Sohma, a character in the anime series Just Because!
- Haruto Tenjo (ハルト), a character in the anime series Yu-Gi-Oh! Zexal
- Haruto Tokishima (ハルト), the main character in the anime Valvrave the Liberator
- Haruto Yuto, a character in the video game Yandere Simulator
