= Santos Olikong =

Palauan politician

Speaker of the House of Delegates of Palau
- In office July 1985 – November 1988
- Preceded by: Carlos Salii
- Succeeded by: Shiro Kyota

Personal details
- Born: ca. 1937-1939
- Died: 2011

Santos Olikong was a Palauan politician and a former Speaker of the House of Delegates of Palau. He was also a senator, bank manager and cabinet minister.

In 1972, Olikong was appointed as the manager of the Koror branch of the Bank of Hawaii.

By 1980, Olikong was vice-speaker of Palau legislature. In the 1980 elections he won a delegate seat in the House of Delegates of Palau representing the State of Koror. He was elected Speaker of the House of Delegates of Palau from 1985 to 1988. He opposed the Compact of Free Association. Olikong was an unsuccessful presidential candidate in the 1988 elections. Later he was appointed as Minister of State by President Ngiratkel Etpison.

Olikong was an unsuccessful candidate in the primaries of the presidential elections of 2000. President Remengesau appointed him as ambassador to Japan in 2004.

Olikong died before Christmas Day in 2011 at the age of 73, so he was born ca. 1937–1939. He was described to have been a colorful figure who always had an opinion. He held Koror traditional title 'Rubasech'.
