= 1988 Palauan general election =

- 2 November 1988
- Presidential election
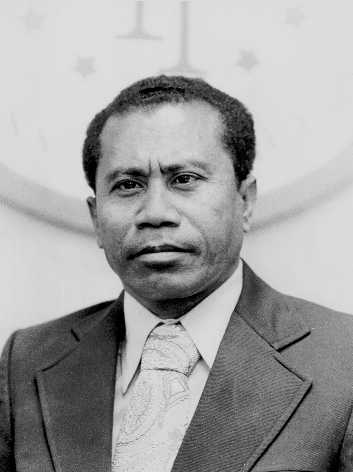

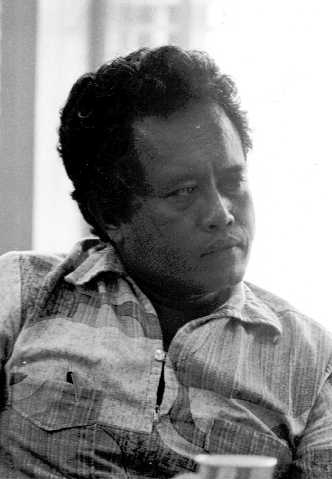
Candidate	Ngiratkel Etpison	Roman Tmetuchl
Party	Independent	Independent
Popular vote	2,392	2,361
Percentage	26.28%	25.94%
Candidate	Thomas Remengesau, Sr.	John Ngiraked
Party	Independent	Independent
Popular vote	1,773	769
Percentage	19.48%	8.45%
President before election
Thomas Remengesau, Sr.
Independent
Elected President
Ngiratkel Etpison
Independent
- Vice presidential election
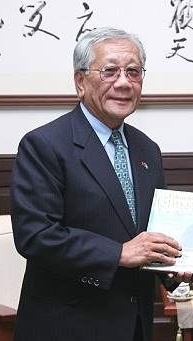

	First party	Second party
Candidate	Kuniwo Nakamura	Kazuo Asamuna
Party	Independent	Independent
Popular vote	5,482	3,328
Percentage	61.82%	37.53%
Vice President before election
Thomas Remengesau Sr.
Independent
Elected Vice President
Kuniwo Nakamura
Independent

General elections were held in Palau on 2 November 1988 to elect a president, vice president and members of the Senate and House of Delegates. All candidates ran as independents. Ngiratkel Etpison was elected president, whilst Kuniwo Nakamura won the election for vice president. Voter turnout was 83%.

== Results ==
=== President ===
Candidate	Votes	%
Ngiratkel Etpison	2,392	26.28
Roman Tmetuchl	2,361	25.94
Thomas Remengesau, Sr.	1,773	19.48
John Ngiraked	769	8.45
Yutaka Gibbons	731	8.03
Moses Uludong	590	6.48
Santos Olikong	476	5.23
Write-ins	10	0.11
Total	9,102	100.00
Valid votes	9,102	98.83
Invalid/blank votes	108	1.17
Total votes	9,210	100.00
Registered voters/turnout	11,146	82.63
Source: Nohlen et al.

=== Vice president ===
Candidate	Votes	%
Kuniwo Nakamura	5,482	61.82
Kazuo Asamuna	3,328	37.53
Write-in	57	0.64
Total	8,867	100.00
Valid votes	8,867	96.28
Invalid/blank votes	343	3.72
Total votes	9,210	100.00
Registered voters/turnout	11,146	82.63
Source: Nohlen et al.

=== Senate ===
Party	Votes	%	Seats	+/–
Independents	8,777	100.00	14	0
Total	8,777	100.00	14	0
Valid votes	8,777	95.30		
Invalid/blank votes	433	4.70		
Total votes	9,210	100.00		
Registered voters/turnout	11,146	82.63		
Source: Nohlen et al.

=== House of Delegates ===
Party	Votes	%	Seats	+/–
Independents	8,657	100.00	16	0
Total	8,657	100.00	16	0
Valid votes	8,657	94.00		
Invalid/blank votes	553	6.00		
Total votes	9,210	100.00		
Registered voters/turnout	11,146	82.63		
Source: Nohlen et al.
