= Thomas Remengesau =

Thomas Remengesau may refer to:

- Thomas Remengesau Sr. (1929–2019), interim President of Palau, 1988–1989
- Thomas Remengesau Jr. (born 1956), President of Palau, 2001–2008 and from 2013
