= Yasujirō =

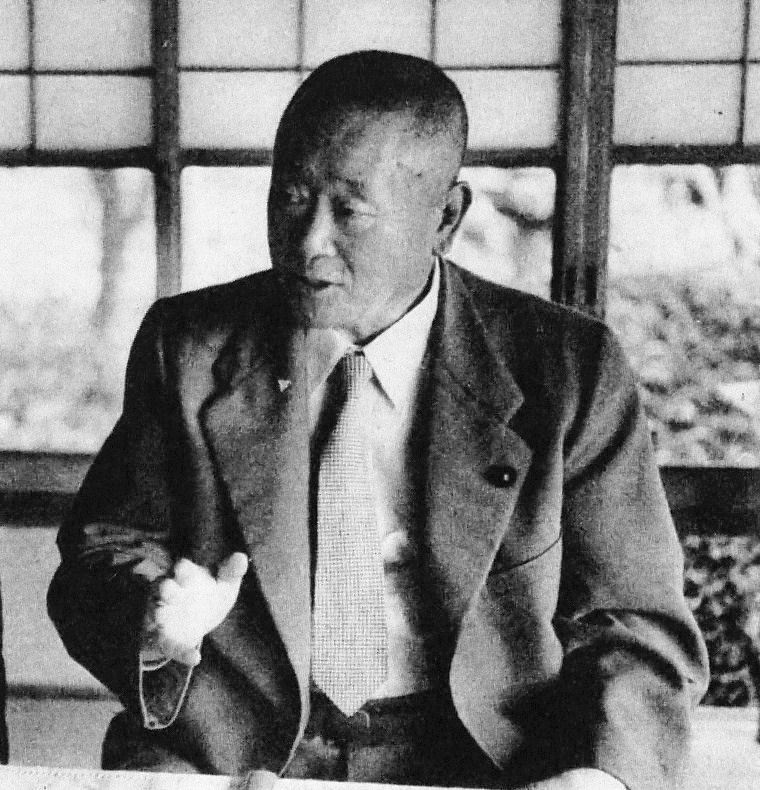
- Yasujiro Tsutsumi (1889-1964), Japanese politician
- Pronunciation: jasɯdʑiɾoɯ (IPA)
- Gender: Male

Origin
- Origin: Japanese
- Meaning: Different meanings depending on the kanji used

Other names
- Alternative spelling: Yasuziro (Kunrei-shiki) Yasuziro (Nihon-shiki) Yasujirō, Yasujiro, Yasujirou (Hepburn)

Yasujirō, Yasujiro or Yasujirou is a masculine Japanese given name.

== Written forms ==
Yasujirō can be written using different combinations of kanji characters. Here are some examples:

The characters used for "jiro" (二郎 or 次郎) literally means "second son" and usually used as a suffix to a masculine name, especially for the second child. The "yasu" part of the name can use a variety of characters, each of which will change the meaning of the name ("康" for healthy, "靖" for peaceful, "安" and so on).

- 康二郎, "healthy, second son"
- 靖次郎, "peaceful, second son"
- 安二郎, "tranquil, second son"
- 保次郎, "preserve, second son"
- 泰二郎, "peaceful, second son"

Other combinations...

- 康治郎, "healthy, to manage/cure, son"
- 康次朗, "healthy, next, clear"
- 靖治郎, "peaceful, to manage/cure, son"
- 安次朗, "tranquil, next, clear"
- 保次朗, "preserve, next, clear"

The name can also be written in hiragana やすじろう or katakana ヤスジロウ.

== Notable people with the name ==
- Yasujirō Nagata (永田 泰次郎; 1867-1923), Japanese vice admiral
- Yasujiro Niwa (丹羽 保次郎; 1893-1975), Japanese scientist
- Yasujiro Ozu (小津 安二郎; 1903-1963), Japanese film director
- Yasujirō Shimazu (島津 保次郎; 1897-1945), Japanese film director
- Yasujiro Tsutsumi (堤 康次郎; 1889-1964), Japanese politician
