= 1996 Palauan general election =

- 24 September 1996 (first round); 5 November 1996 (second round)
- Presidential election
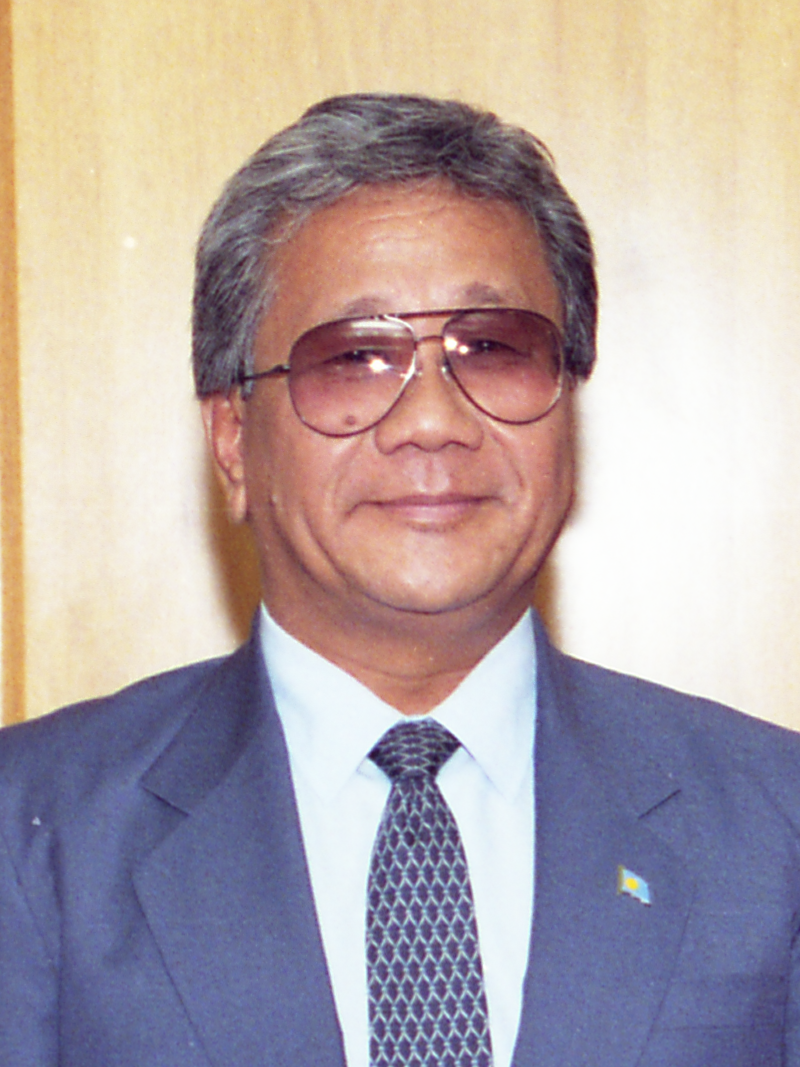

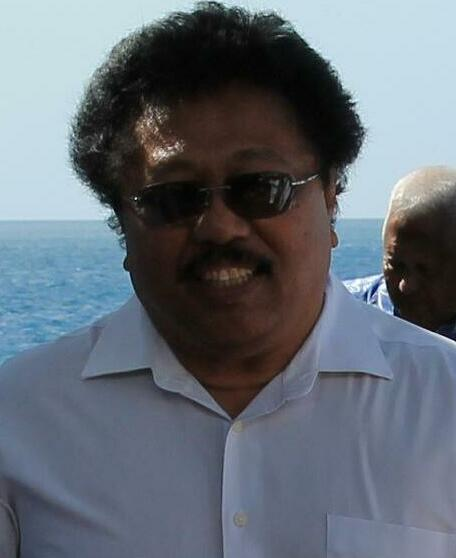
| Candidate | Kuniwo Nakamura | Yutaka Gibbons |
| Party | Independent | Independent |
| Popular vote | 6,052 | 3,356 |
| Percentage | 64.33% | 35.67% |
presidential before election
Kuniwo Nakamura
Independent
Elected presidential
Kuniwo Nakamura
Independent
- Vice presidential election
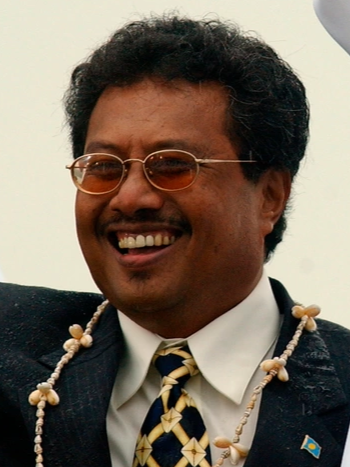

| Candidate | Thomas Remengesau Jr. | Kione Isechal |
| Party | Independent | Independent |
| Popular vote | 6,672 | 3,038 |
| Percentage | 68.71% | 31.29% |
Vice President before election
Thomas Remengesau Jr.
Independent
Elected Vice President
Thomas Remengesau Jr.
Independent

General elections were held in Palau in 1996 to elect a president, vice president, Senate and House of Delegates. The first round of the presidential election took place on 24 September, whilst the run-off election and the election for the House of Delegates and Senate took place on 5 November. All candidates ran as independents, with 36 candidates contesting the 14 Senate seats and 35 for the 16 House of Delegates seats. Incumbent Kuniwo Nakamura was re-elected President, whilst Thomas Remengesau Jr. was re-elected vice president. Voter turnout was 77% in the presidential elections on 24 September and 81% on 5 November.

== Results ==
=== President ===
Toribiong withdrew his candidacy prior to the second round following his poor performance compared to 1992 and the collapse of the Koror-Babeldaob Bridge, which Toribiong stated should receive the government's full attention.

| Candidate | First round | | Second round | |
| Candidate | Votes | % | Votes | % |
|---|---|---|---|---|
| Kuniwo Nakamura | 4,900 | 52.66 | 6,052 | 64.33 |
| Johnson Toribiong | 3,092 | 33.23 | | |
| Yutaka Gibbons | 1,313 | 14.11 | 3,356 | 35.67 |
| Total | 9,305 | 100.00 | 9,408 | 100.00 |
| Valid votes | 9,305 | 98.65 | 9,408 | 92.94 |
| Invalid/blank votes | 127 | 1.35 | 715 | 7.06 |
| Total votes | 9,432 | 100.00 | 10,123 | 100.00 |
| Registered voters/turnout | 12,249 | 77.00 | 12,437 | 81.39 |
Source: Nohlen et al.

=== Vice president ===
| Candidate | Votes | % |
|---|---|---|
| Thomas Remengesau Jr. | 6,672 | 68.71 |
| Kione Isechal | 3,038 | 31.29 |
| Total | 9,710 | 100.00 |
| Valid votes | 9,710 | 95.92 |
| Invalid/blank votes | 413 | 4.08 |
| Total votes | 10,123 | 100.00 |
| Registered voters/turnout | 12,437 | 81.39 |
Source: Nohlen et al.

=== Senate ===
| Party | Votes | % | Seats | +/– |
|---|---|---|---|---|
| Independents | 9,487 | 100.00 | 14 | 0 |
| Total | 9,487 | 100.00 | 14 | 0 |
| Valid votes | 9,487 | 92.80 | | |
| Invalid/blank votes | 736 | 7.20 | | |
| Total votes | 10,223 | 100.00 | | |
| Registered voters/turnout | 12,437 | 82.20 | | |
Source: Nohlen et al.

=== House of Delegates ===
| Party | Votes | % | Seats | +/– |
|---|---|---|---|---|
| Independents | 9,655 | 100.00 | 16 | 0 |
| Total | 9,655 | 100.00 | 16 | 0 |
| Valid votes | 9,655 | 94.44 | | |
| Invalid/blank votes | 568 | 5.56 | | |
| Total votes | 10,223 | 100.00 | | |
| Registered voters/turnout | 12,437 | 82.20 | | |
Source: Nohlen et al.
