= Koror–Babeldaob Bridge =

Bridge in Palau

Coordinates: 7.36204°N 134.50424°E

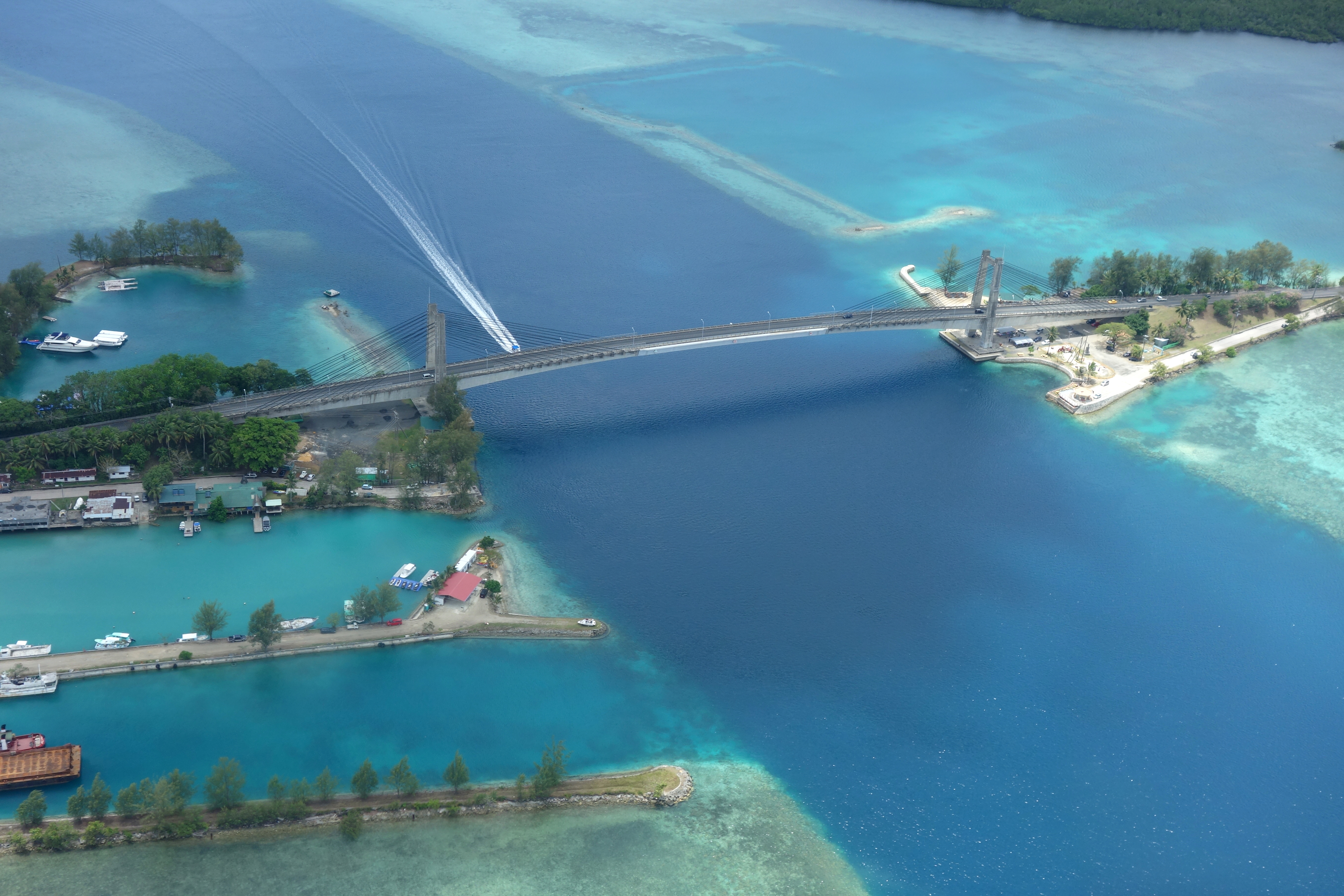
Koror–Babeldaob Bridge in 2016

Map of the Koror-Babeldaob bridge

The Koror–Babeldaob Bridge is a bridge in Palau that connects Koror and Babeldaob Islands. It is a reinforced concrete, portal frame, cable-stayed bridge with a total length of 413 m. It was built by the Kajima Corporation of Japan in 2002, to replace the former bridge built by Socio Construction Co. of South Korea in 1978 which collapsed in 1996.

== The former KB Bridge ==
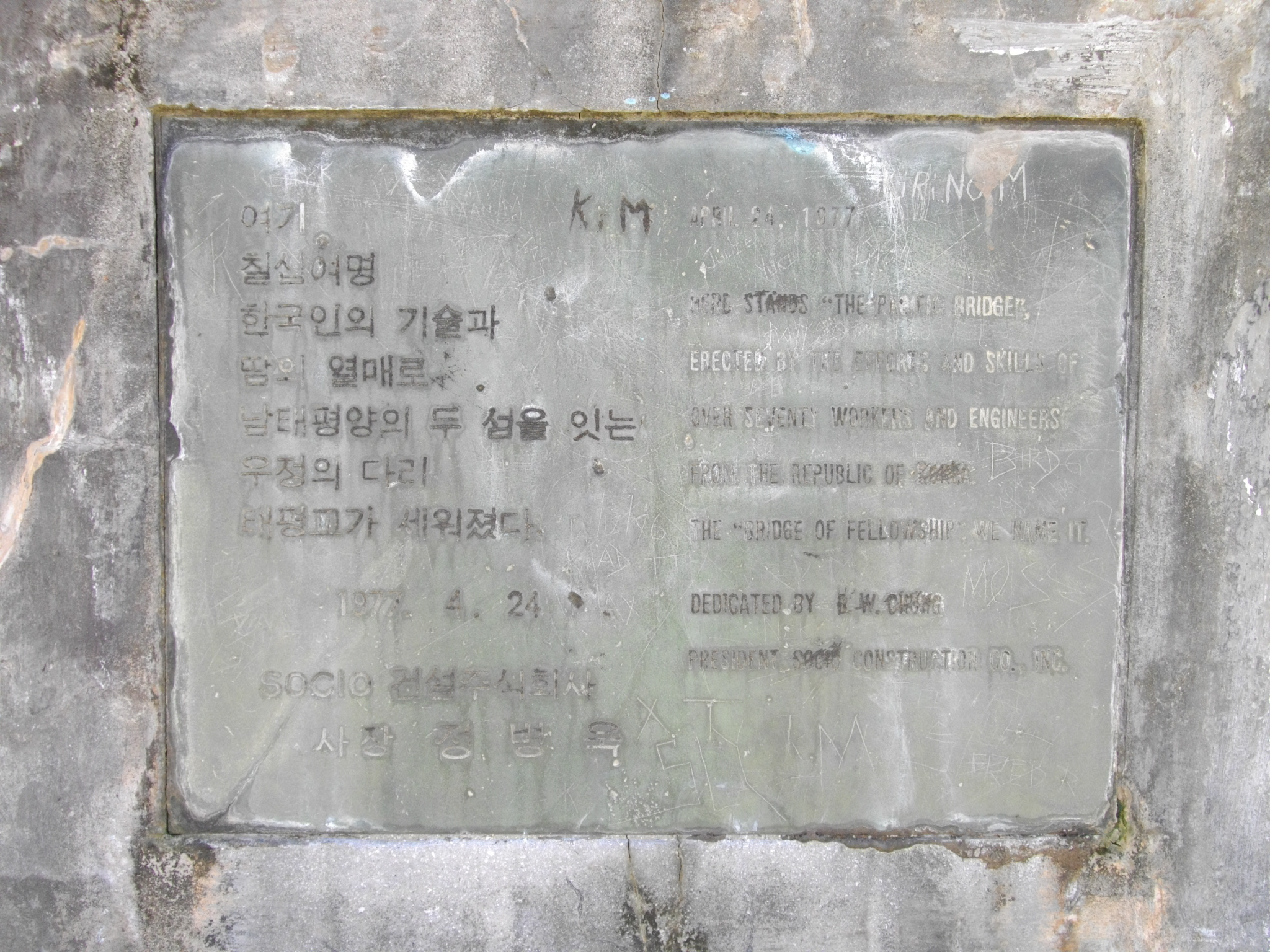
The preserved slate of the former Koror-Babeldaob Bridge; January 2011.

The original Koror–Babeldaob Bridge was a balanced cantilever prestressed concrete box girder bridge with a main span of 240.8 m and total length of 385.6 m (1265 ft). In addition to carrying traffic, it also carried piping and conduits for fresh water and electricity. It was designed by Dyckerhoff & Widmann AG and Alfred A. Yee and Associates. It was constructed by Dyckerhoff & Widmann AG, contractor was Palau based Korean company, Socio Construction Co. It was the world's largest bridge of its type, until its record was broken by the 260 m span of the Gateway Bridge in Brisbane, Australia, finished in 1985.

The middle hinge point of the bridge began to noticeably sag in the middle 10 years after its completion. This led to two studies carried out by Louis Berger International and the Japan international Cooperation Agency (JICA) in 1990. They concluded that the bridge was "safe" as of now (in 100 year increments it will cave in 90 cm) and the large deflections were due to creep and the modulus of elasticity of the concrete in place being lower than anticipated.

After having reinforcement work done, the bridge suddenly collapsed at approximately 17:35 on 26 September 1996 and shut off fresh water and electricity between the islands. In addition, the collapse killed two people and injured four more. This caused the government to declare a state of emergency. By request of Kuniwo Nakamura, then the country's President and foreign minister, Japan provided emergency aid as well as a temporary bridge.

=== Reason for the collapse ===
The 18-year-old, Koror-Babeldaob bridge (KB bridge) collapsed abruptly and catastrophically. The failure occurred during benign weather and loading conditions, six years after two independent teams (Louis Berger International and the Japan international Cooperation Agency) of bridge engineers had evaluated the bridge and declared it safe, and less than three months after completion of a strengthening programme to correct a significant midspan sag that was continuing to worsen.

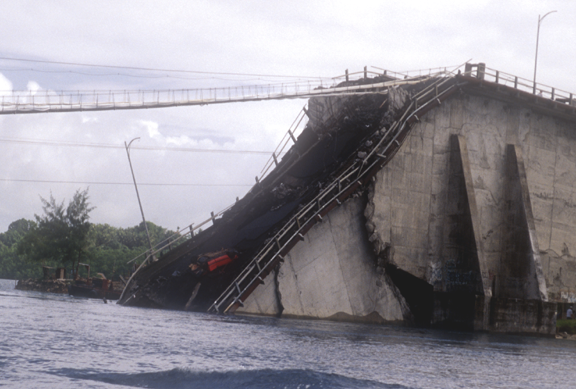
Original Koror-Babeldaob Bridge collapse

By 1990, a physical phenomenon called creep had caused the midline of the bridge to sag 1.2 meters, causing discomfort to drivers and concern for officials. The Palau government commissioned two studies by Louis Berger International and Japan International Co-operation Agency. They both concluded that the bridge was structurally safe as of 1990 though 1m more of creep would occur in the future. Based on the studies, the Palau government decided to counteract the cosmetic damage caused by creep with resurfacing and reinforcement of the bridge.

According to British civil engineers Chris Burgoyne and Richard Scantlebury, the reinforcement operation had four main components.

1. The bridge midspan was modified, changing the originally non-weight-bearing hinged joint to a continuous block of concrete.
2. Eight prestress cables were added to straighten the span.
3. Eight flat-jacks were added to the center of the structure to add additional prestress, loading the center of the bridge.
4. The bridge was resurfaced to smooth out the sagging road.

The most probable progression of the collapse began with a weakening of the Babeldaob side. This caused a shear failure, resulting in all of the weight of the continuous main span coming to rest on the Koror side. This unbalanced moment caused the back span of the Koror side to fail and tipped the bridge into the channel. The new design of the bridge hastened the bridge's collapse, but did not actually cause the fatal weakening of the Babeldoab flange. The cause of collapse remains unknown though it was studied in some detail by professional firms and researchers. The repair and resurfacing operation may have contributed to the bridge failure, but since the lawsuit over the collapse was settled out of court, no final cause has ever been definitively published.

== Japan-Palau Friendship Bridge ==
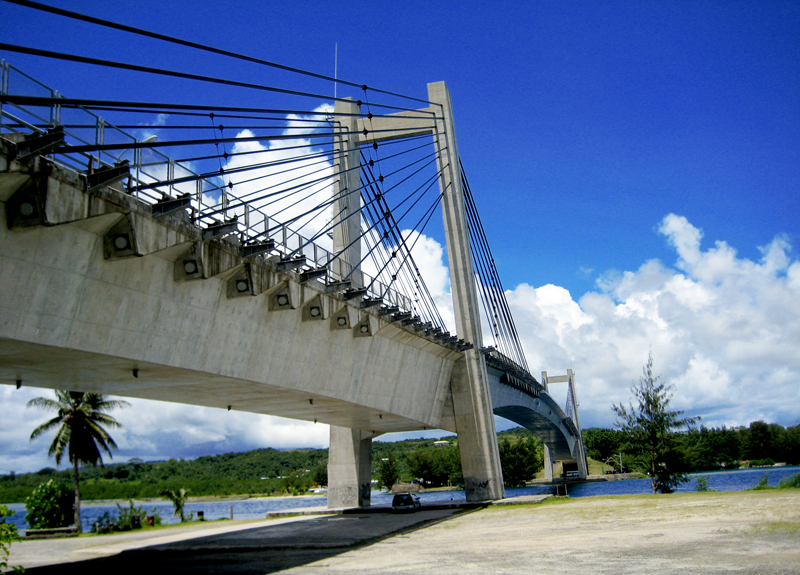
The bridge was named "Japan-Palau Friendship Bridge"

As the Palau government lacked sufficient funds to rebuild immediately, a new bridge to provide a steady transportation system was constructed with significant Japanese Grant Aid in ODA. Its construction began in 1997 by Kajima Corporation, a Japanese construction company, and was completed in December, 2001. It was named "Japan-Palau Friendship Bridge" on its opening ceremony on January 11, 2002.

== See also ==
- List of bridge failures
