= William Vitarelli =

American educator in Micronesia

William V. Vitarelli
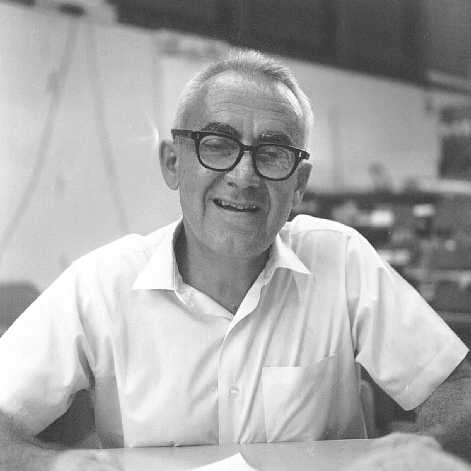
- Vitarelli in 1974
- Born: October 21, 1910; New York, New York
- Died: January 19, 2010 (aged 99); Haiku, Hawaii
- Other names: Vit, Rubak
- Education: Teachers College, Columbia University
- Occupations: Educator, architect, woodworker
- Years active: 1948–1970

William Vincent "Vit" Vitarelli (October 21, 1910 – January 19, 2010), also referred to as Rubak in Palau, was an American educator and architect. He worked for the Trust Territory of the Pacific Islands (TTPI) from 1948 to 1970. He was stationed in various islands in Micronesia, including Palau and Ebeye, and participated in various educational and community development projects.

== Biography ==
=== Early life ===
Vitarelli was born on October 21, 1910, in New York City's Greenwich Village to parents of Italian ancestry. He gained an early interest in woodworking; attending four years of college to earn certification to teach high school shop. During his college years, he attended Newark Teachers College, Columbia University, Temple University, and University of Pennsylvania (1938–44). He attended Columbia University Teachers College and studied community development and architecture, earning a doctoral degree in 1953.

=== Vitarelli v. Seaton ===
Vitarelli joined the Trust Territory of the Pacific Islands (TTPI) and was employed as a teacher on Koror. He was fired in 1954 during the McCarthy era on loyalty-security grounds. He was accused of associating with alleged supporters of the Communist Party USA, reading some communist publications, and being a member of the socialist American Labor Party. He eventually took this before the U.S. Supreme Court in the case Vitarelli v. Seaton. Vitarelli won the case after a two-year battle and returned to Micronesia in his previous position at the TTPI.

=== Trust Territory employee ===
In 1948, the TTPI assigned Vitarelli to the island of Palau as a community development and education specialist. He arrived on Palau in November 1949 and helped Roman Tmetuchl organize a workers' strike to raise the locals' wages. From 1951 to 1954, Vitarelli worked on various community projects. He established Palau's first saw mill and its first food markets; initiated a boat building project and built a small furniture factory; and also started the island's first community fair and dance festival.

Vitarelli's personal views often put him at odds with the US government. He personally wanted to help the Palauans become self-sufficient, but the TTPI wanted to focus on improving Micronesia–United States relations. Nevertheless, he established community schools that replaced the Japanese three Rs educational model with Deweyism. In 1962, the TTPI assigned Vitarelli as an architect and project coordinator in the Accelerated Elementary School Program (AESP), a project costing over one million dollars. He wanted to have local Palauans to build schools and houses under this program. The TTPI rejected these plans, insisting that the locals could not meet the project's physical specifications. As a result of this conflict, the TTPI transferred Vitarelli to its headquarters in Saipan. While on Saipan, Vitarelli used local bayogo seeds to create the Bo Jo Bo Wishing Doll for an upcoming arts festival. These traditional-style dolls are still sold on Saipan today.

Vitarelli worked for two years in the late 1960s as the TTPI's district administrator representative on Ebeye Island. He organized development projects including school programs, a youth corps, and a community garden. He talked to reporters from Life Magazine who were banned from Ebeye, which angered the island's officials. Vitarelli also warned the island's Commander about a future outbreak of gastroenteritis. When the outbreak occurred, he tried to assist in getting the islanders to hospital care. In 1968, he spoke out against what he saw as the U.S. military's indifference to Marshallese workers.

=== Retirement ===
Vitarelli retired from the TTPI in 1970. He then became the vice president for research and development at the University of Guam. In 1974, he tried working with Modekngei leaders to build a religious high school. However, he disagreed with these leaders after they accepted a financial endowment from a Californian foundation.

Vitarelli and his family moved to the Hawaiian island Maui in 1976 and lived in Haiku. He personally devoted his time to designing and building homes, farming, and writing. He died on January 19, 2010, and was buried at sea off of the Maliko Bay boat ramp. Johnson Toribiong, the president of Palau at that time, called for a five-day period of mourning and remembrance for "Rubak" Vitarelli.

== Personal and family life ==
William was a Quaker and peace activist. While in Micronesia, he became known as "Rubak", a Palauan title denoting a wise and humble man which is rarely given to non-locals. The historian Dirk Ballendorf described William as a "bleeding-heart liberal" and an admirer of President Jimmy Carter.

While in Micronesia, William and his wife Henrietta Taylor raised and adopted a young girl named Heather. At the age of 29, Heather died from a stray bullet on September 8, 2000, while visiting the casino Harrah's Las Vegas. The Vitarelli family opposed the court in giving the casino shooter the death penalty. Instead, the court sentenced the shooter to at least 48 years in prison. William Vitarelli told reporters he felt this sentence was "too long". Henrietta died in 2003, and William remarried a woman named Charlaine on October 21, 2007. In 2010, William was survived by his 5 children, 12 grandchildren, and 14 great-grandchildren.
