= Carlos Salii =

Palauan politician

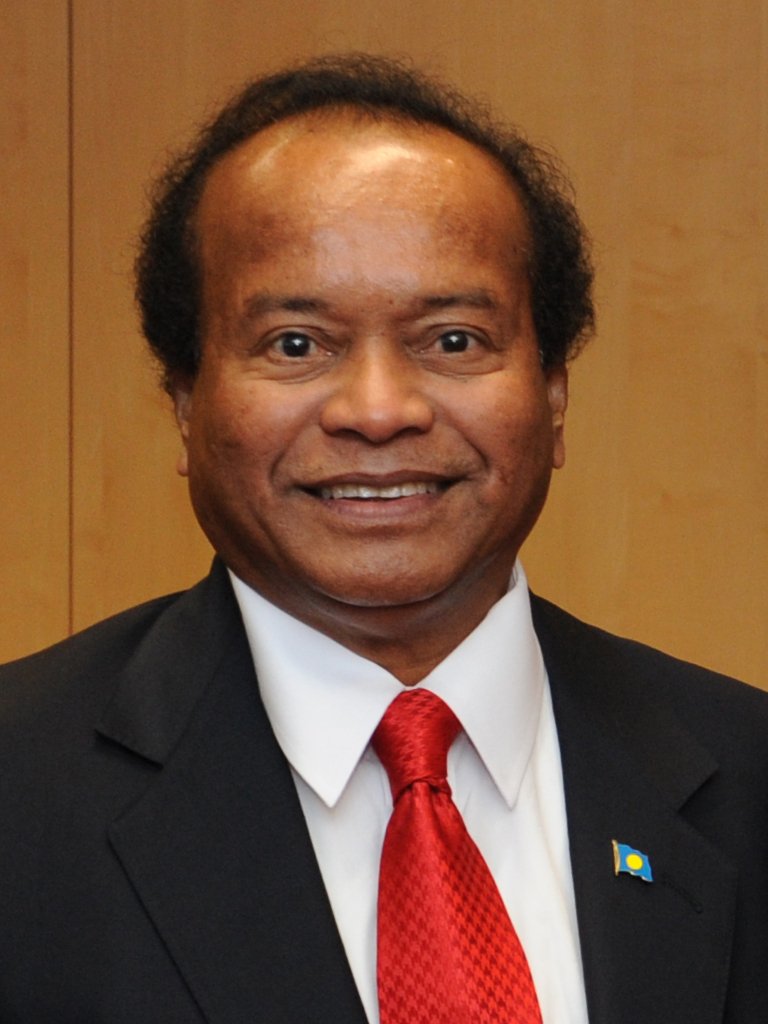

Speaker of the House of Delegates of Palau
- In office January 1981 – July 1985
- Preceded by: New position
- Succeeded by: Santos Olikong

Personal details
- Born: Carlos Hiroshi Salii
- Died: 2014
- Relatives: Lazarus Salii (brother)

Carlos Hiroshi Salii (died 2014) was a Palauan lawyer, politician and a former Speaker of the House of Delegates of Palau from 1981 to 1985.

Salii worked as assistant attorney general of the Trust Territory of the Pacific Islands in 1970s. He worked as legislative counsel of the Angaur state.

Salii was floor leader of the Palau legislature in 1980. He was elected to the first House of Delegates of Palau in the 1980 elections. He was elected as the Speaker of the House of Delegates when the house convened in January. He represented the state of Ngeaur a.k.a. Angaur. He was re-elected in 1984. He was expelled from the House of Delegates.

He was the younger brother of former president Lazarus Salii. He died 2014.
