= Peter Sugiyama =

Palauan politician

President of the Senate of Palau
- In office January 1993 – November 1996
- Preceded by: Isidoro Rudimch
- Succeeded by: Isidoro Rudimch

Personal details
- Born: Peter Lawrence Naoya Sugiyama; 19 April 1943
- Died: 10 June 2007 (aged 64)
- Spouse: Akiko Sugiyama

Peter Lawrence Naoya Sugiyama (19 April 1943–10 June 2007) was a Palauan politician.

== Personal life ==
Sugiyama's father Hayato Sugiyama (杉山隼人) was a Japanese immigrant. He moved to Koror in 1914 at the invitation of his uncle, after the Japanese Empire seized control of the islands as part of its World War I invasion of German New Guinea (which control would later be formalised by the League of Nations as the South Seas Mandate). He began his new life there as a teacher, but would go on to manage a fruit packing company and a cafe. He married Rosang Sayoko Serek, the daughter of a local chieftain.

Peter Sugiyama himself was born to Hayato and Rosang on April 19, 1943. After completing his early education at Koror Elementary School and Mindszenty Intermediate School, he went overseas to continue his education, first to Xavier High School on Weno (then also part of the Trust Territory of the Pacific Islands, now a municipality of Chuuk, Federated States of Micronesia) and then the University of Guam, where he studied political science and history (BA 1967) and then sociology and public administration (BA 1968). In 1982, he was a witness to the shooting death of Bedor Bins, which occurred during an assassination attempt on his son Roman Bedor; the assassins also fired a shot at Sugiyama himself, but missed.

Sugiyama was married to fellow politician Akiko Sugiyama. She was the first woman elected to the Palau National Congress, and in 2005 also became one of the first, along with Vicki Kanai, after Governor Theodosia Blailes of Angaur in 1993, to be elected as a state governor.

== Political career ==
=== On public bodies ===
Beginning in 1970, Sugiyama served in leadership positions on a number of public bodies, including:

- Vice Chairman of the Palau Economic Development Planning Council
- Vice Chairman of the T.T. Coconut Processing Council
- Chairman of the Palau Public Lands Authority
- Executive Director of the Palau Community Action Agency

In his position on the CAA, he ran a program to help Palauans develop fishing and agricultural skills to earn income, and expressed opposition to port development in Koror due to its potential environmental effects.

=== In elected office ===
Sugiyama was first elected to public office in 1979, serving thereafter as:

- Delegate to the First Palau Constitutional Convention, 1979
- Member of the Seventh Palau Legislature, 1980
- Senator (Koror) in the First Senate of Palau
- Senator (Fourth Senatorial District) in the Third Senate of Palau, 1989–1992
- Senator (Fourth Senatorial District) in the Fourth Senate of Palau, 1993–1996
- Senator (Second Senatorial District) in the Fifth Senate of Palau, 1996–1999

During his last term, he was elected President of the Senate, from January 1993 to November 1996.

=== 2000 presidential campaign ===
Sugiyama ran for president in the 2000 election. During his tenure as Senate president, he had been a loyal supporter of outgoing president Kuniwo Nakamura, and hoped to be next in line after Nakamura stepped down at the end of his second term due to term limits. However, in July 2000, Nakamura announced his support for his vice president Tommy Remengesau's presidential campaign. With this strong support, Rememgesau thus came in first in the primaries; out of 9,221 votes cast, he took almost 43% (4,000 votes), against just 22% (2,050) for second-place Sugiyama, with the rest distributed among minister of education Billy Kuartei, senator Santos Olikong, and Angaur governor Ben Roberto. The three other losers in the primaries threw their weight behind Sugiyama for the general elections, and he managed to significantly narrow the gap between himself and Remengesau. In the end, out of 10,718 votes (an 81% turnout), Sugiyama lost by a margin of 674 votes.

== Death ==
After a long battle with illness, Sugiyama died on June 10, 2007. He was survived by his wife, two sons (Clarence and Wayne), one daughter (Sarah Lynn), two sisters (Michie and Yosie), and four brothers (Nobuya, John Takaya, George, and Singeru).
