= 1984 Palauan general election =

- 30 November 1984
- Presidential election
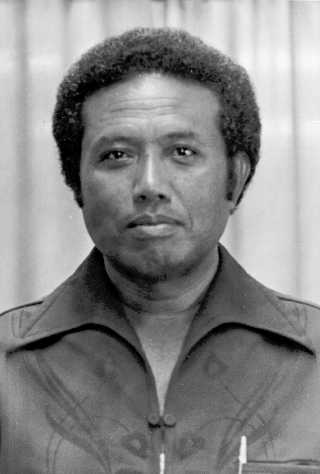

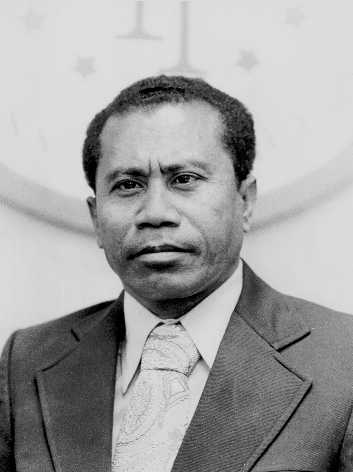

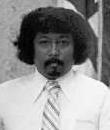
Candidate	Haruo Remeliik	Roman Tmetuchl	Yutaka Gibbons
Party	Independent	Independent	Independent
Popular vote	4,050	2,482	1,418
Percentage	50.94%	31.22%	17.84%
President before election
Haruo Remeliik
Independent
Elected President
Haruo Remeliik
Independent
- Vice presidential election
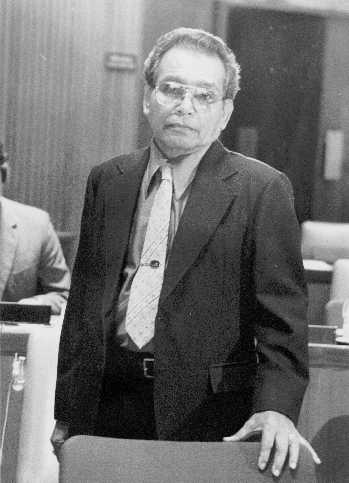

Candidate	Alfonso Oiterong	Sadang Silmai	John Tarkong
Party	Independent	Independent	Independent
Popular vote	4,252	2,373	866
Percentage	56.76%	31.68%	11.56%
Vice President before election
Alfonso Oiterong
Independent
Elected Vice President
Alfonso Oiterong
Independent

General elections were held in Palau on 30 November 1984 to elect a president, vice-president, Senate and House of Delegates. All candidates ran as independents. Incumbent Haruo Remeliik won the election for president with 50.9% of the vote, whilst Alfonso Oiterong was re-elected to the post of vice-president.

In the parliamentary elections, only five incumbent senators were re-elected, while 11 of the 16 members of the House of Delegates were returned. Voter turnout was 83.9%.

== Results ==
=== President ===
Candidate	Votes	%
Haruo Remeliik	4,050	50.94
Roman Tmetuchl	2,482	31.22
Yutaka Gibbons	1,418	17.84
Total	7,950	100.00
Valid votes	7,950	98.62
Invalid/blank votes	111	1.38
Total votes	8,061	100.00
Registered voters/turnout	9,605	83.93
Source: Nohlen et al.

=== Vice-president ===
Candidate	Votes	%
Alfonso Oiterong	4,252	56.76
Sadang Silmai	2,373	31.68
John Tarkong	866	11.56
Total	7,491	100.00
Valid votes	7,491	92.93
Invalid/blank votes	570	7.07
Total votes	8,061	100.00
Registered voters/turnout	9,605	83.93
Source: Nohlen et al.

=== Senate ===
Party	Votes	%	Seats	+/–
Independents			14	–4
Total			14	–4
Total votes	8,061	–		
Registered voters/turnout	9,605	83.93		
Source: Nohlen et al.

=== House of Delegates ===
Party	Votes	%	Seats	+/–
Independents			16	0
Total			16	0
Total votes	8,061	–		
Registered voters/turnout	9,605	83.93		
Source: Nohlen et al.
