= Valerie Whipps =

First Lady of Palau

The Honorable Valerie Whipps
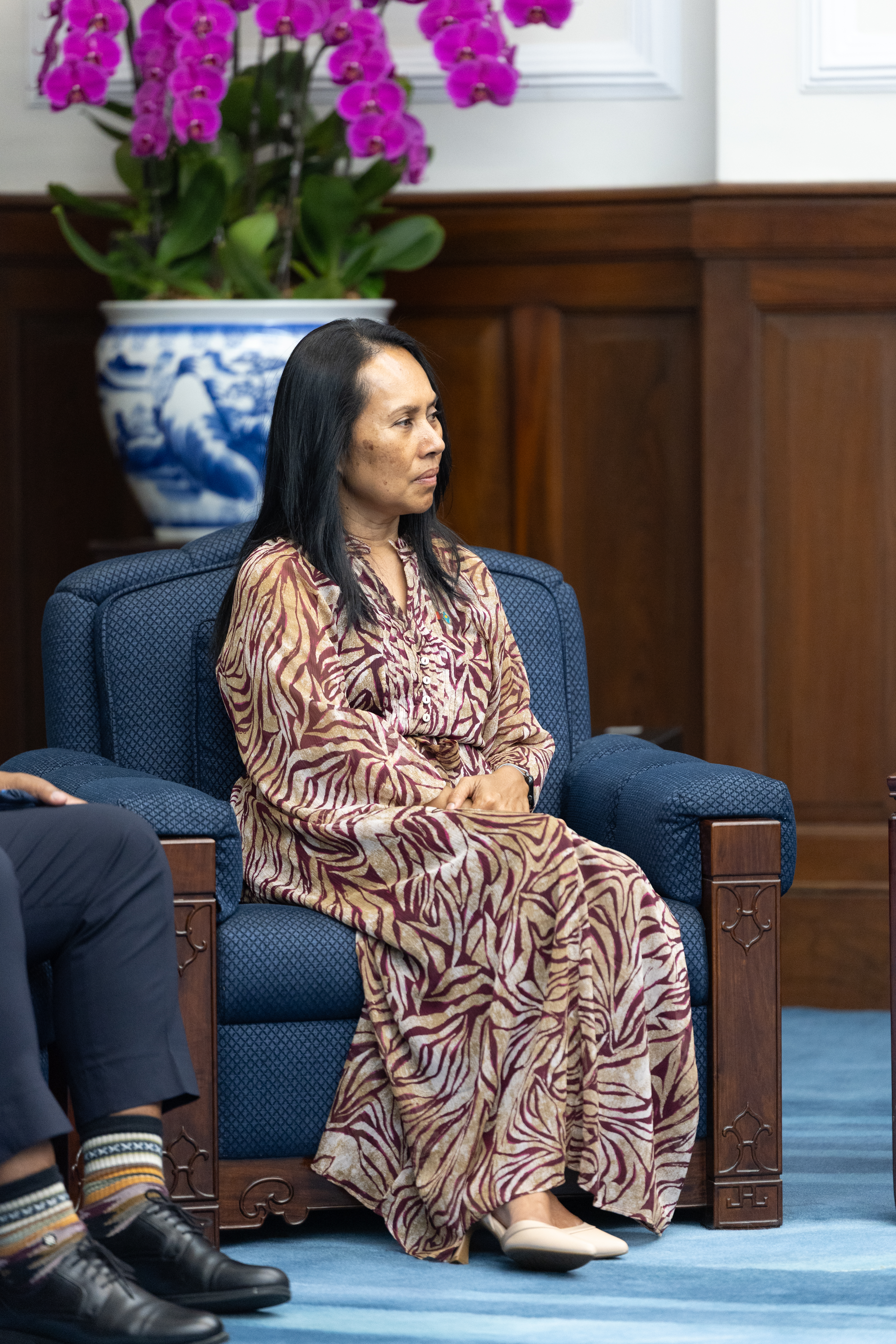
- Valerie Whipps in 2025

First Lady of Palau
- Incumbent
- Assumed office 21 January 2021
- President: Surangel Whipps Jr.
- Preceded by: Debbie Remengesau

Personal details
- Born: Valerie Esang Remengesau Koror, Trust Territory of the Pacific Islands (now Palau)
- Spouse: Surangel Whipps Jr. (m. 1999)
- Children: 4
- Parent(s): Thomas Remengesau Sr. (father; deceased); Ferista Esang Remengesau (mother)
- Relatives: Tommy Remengesau (brother); Surangel Whipps Sr. (father-in-law)
- Occupation: politician

Valerie Esang Whipps (née Remengesau) is a Palauan stateswoman who has been First Lady of Palau since 21 January 2021.

== Career ==
Whipps accompanied her husband on a state visit to Taiwan in March 2021. They met with President of Taiwan Tsai Ing-wen.

== Personal life ==
She married future President Surangel Whipps Jr. in 1999.

She is the daughter and sister of former presidents Thomas Remengesau Sr. and Tommy Remengesau Jr. respectively.
