= Kojūrō Nozaki =

Rear admiral in the Imperial Japanese Navy

Rear Admiral Kojūrō Nozaki
- 野崎 小十郎
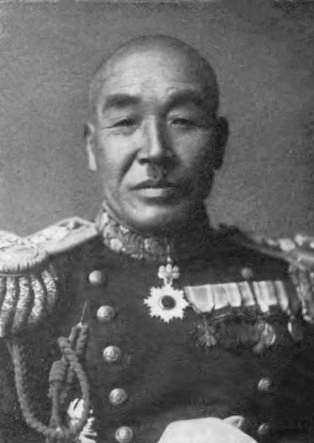
- Born: December 2, 1872; Geisei, Kōchi, Japan
- Died: April 21, 1946 (aged 73)
- Military career
- Allegiance: Empire of Japan
- Branch: Imperial Japanese Navy
- Service years: 1894–1923
- Rank: Rear Admiral
- Conflicts: Boxer Rebellion; Russo-Japanese War; World War I

Kojūrō Nozaki (野崎 小十郎, Nozaki Kojūrō; December 2, 1872 – April 21, 1946) was a Japanese admiral who was Commander of the Interim Southern Islands Defense Unit from 1919 to 1922.

== Biography ==
Nozaki was born in Aki District, Kōchi in what is now part of the village of Geisei, Kōchi. He graduated from the 21st class of the Imperial Japanese Naval Academy in 1894. He was commissioned as a lieutenant on September 29, 1899, and served as chief gunnery officer on the ironclad Kongō. From June to September 1900 he was deployed to China as a crewman on the cruiser Kasagi, which was sent to support Japanese naval landing forces which occupied the port city of Tianjin in northern China during the Boxer Rebellion, as part of the Japanese contribution to the Eight-Nation Alliance. He subsequently briefly served as chief navigator on the corvettes Tenryū and Katsuragi and taught navigation at the Imperial Japanese Naval Academy from December 1901 to July 1903. During the Russo-Japanese War, he served in various staff positions and was promoted to lieutenant commander on August 5, 1905. Nozaki graduated from the Naval War College in December 1907 and was promoted to commander in March 1910. He served as chief gunnery officer on the battleship Aki from July 1910 to December 1911.

He received his first command, that of the cruiser Niitaka on October 30, 1914 and was promoted to captain in December of the same year. During World War I, Nozaki was chief-of-staff of the Interim Southern Islands Defense Unit from March 1915 to November 1916, and captained the cruiser Ikoma from December 1916 to December 1917. Afterwards, he was an inspector at the Yokosuka Naval Arsenal to April 1919, when he returned to sea as captain of the new battleship Kongō to November 1919. He was promoted to rear admiral on December 1, 1919 and Commander of the Interim Southern Islands Defense Unit from December 1919 to April 1922.

He went on the reserve list in March 1923 and retired November 1933.

== Honors ==
- 1914 - Order of the Sacred Treasure, 3rd class
- 1921 - Order of the Sacred Treasure, 2nd class

Preceded by Yasujiro Nagata	Commander of Interim Southern Islands Defense Unit; 1919–1922	Succeeded by Toshiro Tezuka as Head of Civil Affairs Bureau
