= Akiko Sugiyama =

Palauan politician

Akiko C. Bedor Sugiyama is a Palauan politician, and widow of Palauan senator Peter Sugiyama. As late as 1995, she was the only woman who had ever been elected to the Palau National Congress. In 2005, she was elected governor of Ngardmau in a special election after the impeachment of Schwartz Tudong over the misuse of public funds. Along with Vicky Kanai of Airai, she was the first woman to be elected governor of any of the states of Palau.
