= Roman Tmetuchl =

Palauan politician and businessman (1926–1999)

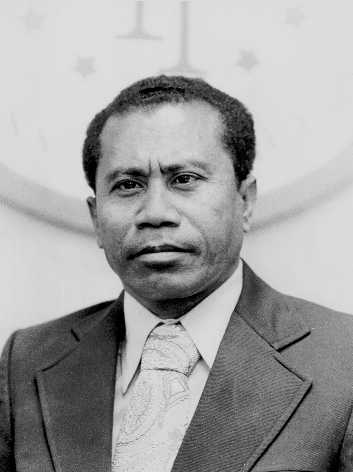
- Born: February 11, 1926; Babelthuap, Airai, Palau
- Died: July 1, 1999 (aged 73)
- Occupation(s): Businessman, politician
- Years active: 1970–1990
- Spouse: Dirrengerkiu Perpetua "Tua" Polloi Tmetuchl
- Relatives: Mamoru Nakamura (son-in-law)

Administrative Assistant to the Chief Justice of the Trust Territory High Court
- In office 1952–1957

Roman Tmetuchl (February 11, 1926 – July 1, 1999) was a Palauan political leader and businessman. He grew up in Japanese-controlled Palau and joined the Kempeitai, the Japanese secret police, during World War II. After the war, he became the leader of Palau's Liberal Party. He worked in the Congress of the Trust Territory of the Pacific Islands from 1964 to 1978 and advocated for Palau gaining a separate status from the rest of Micronesia. He became governor of Airai and engaged in three unsuccessful Palauan presidential campaigns. As a businessman, Tmetuchl led several construction projects for his business holdings and for the Palauan community, including the Palau International Airport (which was later renamed in his honor) and a Seventh-Day Adventist clinic.

== Early life ==
Tmetuchl was born in the Eloklsumech clan of Airai in 1926. He grew up in Koror while Palau was under Japanese control. He attended a Japanese elementary school in Koror and excelled in mathematics. During this time, he worked as a janitor and paperboy. Tmetuchl was also a sprinter and jumper and was, according to William Vitarelli, regarded as the fastest sprinter in Palau and Guam in 1949. Later in his life he would coach teams and sponsor Palau's athletes in the 1969 Micronesian Games.

In 1943, he was recruited to work for the Kempeitai, the Empire of Japan's military police in World War II. He started with various cleaning jobs and then worked for Lieutenant Colonel Aritsune Miyazaki. He participated in military drills and exercises, and learned about the war's status at police headquarters.

After the war, he returned to Koror and started working for the United States military at a quarry. Tmetuchl, who at that time could speak Palauan and Japanese, started learning English. He was recruited in a teacher training group and learned more English. In 1948 he traveled to Guam for further training and testified at a war crime trial for twenty Imperial Japanese Army personnel. At the age of 23, he was placed in the 11th grade at George Washington High School in Guam. He graduated in 1951 and was one of the top ten students of his class.

== Political career ==
=== Early political activities ===
Tmetuchl was a leader of Palau's Liberal Party throughout his political career. In 1950, he led Palau's second workers' strike to raise wages. Throughout the 1950s and early 1960s he worked in Trust Territory of the Pacific Islands (TTPI) positions such as translator, public defender, counselor, administrative assistant, and district court judge. During the 1954–1955 academic year, he studied law and social welfare in the Philippines under a United Nations scholarship. On April 9, 1956, he succeeded his brother Toribiong Uchel as president of Palau's local legislature Olbiil era Kelulau era Belau (Palau's House of Whispered Decisions). He worked from 1954 to 1962 to regain Ngerekebesang Island, which the TTPI had acquired from the Japanese government.

=== Congress of Micronesia ===
In 1965, he was elected into the First Congress of Micronesia for the TTPI. He ran for re-election in 1966 and lost his senate seat to David Ramarui. In 1968, he won a congressional seat by popular vote. He served from 1969 to 1970 on House committees and congressional groups regarding future political status and budget planning. He introduced a political resolution on July 28, 1969, calling for Micronesian independence in at most seven years. The resolution was referred to another committee, and no further political action was taken.

He ran for a seat in the senate against John O. Ngiraked in 1970 and won the popular vote. A few days later, a local man named Hitler attempted to shoot Roman. A man named Heinrich Ngowakl stated that he was tasked by Tmetuchl's political opponent John O. Ngiraked to carry out the assassination, but soon realized he could not personally do it and so he gave the gun to Hitler. Tmetuchl ultimately decided not to press charges. Senator Ambilos Iehsi filed a minority report questioning the election's results by noting an irregularity in the write-in votes. The senate held a session which reviewed the election results and ultimately accepted them. Tmetuchl became a senator in the Congress of Micronesia by taking his oath of office on January 29, 1971. His defining position as senator was advocating for Micronesian independence. He also advocated for filing war claims for the damage Palau received during World War II.

In 1974, Tmetuchl led Palau's newly formed Select Committee on Development and supported a bill which would allow Palauans to write their own constitution. He advocated for a loose federation with the other Micronesian islands and for separate status talks with the United States. To achieve this, he gathered a separatist faction in Palau's legislature. He initially supported Palauan independence but then changed his position to support a status similar to the Commonwealth of the Northern Mariana Islands. A 1975 editorial in the Palauan newspaper Tia Belau criticized Tmetuchl's new position, calling it "out of tune" with local opinion.

Since 1974, rumors spread around the islands that the Palauan government was going to build a superport on Palau. Environmental groups such as the Save Palau Organization opposed this superport and believed that supporting separate status would stop the proposed superport. On March 15, 1976, Tmetuchl and fellow politician Sadang Silmai traveled to Tehran, Iran to meet with officials from the National Iranian Tanker Company and Nissho-Iwai Company to assure them that they could secure a superport on Palau. Tmetuchl ultimately rejected the superport idea by November 1976.

From 1976 to 1978 Tmetuchl acquired several American advisers: Stuart Beck served as a legal counselor to the Palau Political Status Commission (PPSC), William Brophy became Tmetuchl's political adviser, Thomas Gladwin became an unpaid consultant, and John Kenneth Galbraith became an unpaid adviser to the PPSC. Tmetuchl and the PPSC attended the United Nations Trusteeship Council in July 1976, and then flew to Washington, D.C., to discuss Palauan separate status negotiations. Groups supporting Palauan unification with other Micronesian districts petitioned the government to expel Tmetuchl from his senate seat. On February 25, 1978, the senate of the Congress of Micronesia voted to censure and expel Tmetuchl from his position.

In April 1978, he signed the Statement of Agreed Principles for Free Association in Hilo, Hawaii. The Palauan House of Chiefs declared that Tmetuchl had "acted outside the ambit of his authority and responsibility." However, Tmetuchl declared that most Palauans agreed with his actions. The ensuing referendum showed that 88% of the island's voters favored separatist status.

==== Presidential campaigns ====
Tmetuchl ran for president of Palau in 1980 and lost to Remeliik. Tmetuchl stopped supporting the Compact of Free Association and used his power in the senate to oppose Remeliik's administration. He became governor of Airai in January 1981 and acted as a negotiator in three workers' strikes against Remeliik's administration.

Tmetuchl ran for president again in 1984 against incumbent Remeliik and Yutaka Gibbons, but lost again to Remeliik. Remeliik was shot and murdered in 1985. Olbedabel cast suspicion of the murder on Tmetuchl's nephew, preventing Tmetuchl from running for president in August 1985.

He again ran for president in the 1988 elections which was conducted under a plurality voting system. He received 26% of the vote, or just 31 votes fewer than the winning candidate Ngiratkel Etpison; the near-tie led Palauan electoral reform, where elections are conducted under majority voting, with a second round if no candidate received more than half of all votes cast. Faced with political defeat once again, Tmetuchl decided to focus on his business holdings and his family life.

== Business career ==
Tmetuchl owned various businesses throughout his life, including real estate, several restaurants, a travel agency, and a hardware store. In the 1950s, Tmetuchl traveled with his friends to the United States. During the long trip, he learned how to make hollow concrete blocks which cost 35 cents. He took this technique to Palau and made blocks from Japanese concrete structures. With help from his uncle's saw mill, he built a number of houses from these concrete blocks. He established a construction company in 1952 and purchased land in Koror and Babeldaob.

Tmetuchl and his associates helped William Vitarelli, an employee of the TTPI, build schools on Palau by fundraising the project and petitioning the TTPI for a builder's contract. After John O. Ngiraked accused Tmetuchl of not paying the project workers enough money, the courts examined this claim and found that the workers were actually being overpaid. The village of Ngchesar issued a public apology for the ordeal and Tmetuchl sponsored a party for the workers.

In 1966, the high chief Ibedul Ngoriakl commissioned Tmetuchl and his work force to expand a small office building close to the TTPI District Administration office. While under construction, the structure was damaged by Typhoon Sally on March 1, 1967. Ibedul Ngoriakl re-located the construction of his office to the site of a chief's meetinghouse and allowed Tmetuchl to retain his previous damaged project. Tmetuchl repaired and expanded this building, now called the Pacifica Development Corporation Group building, into one of Palau's most important buildings in terms of economics and politics.

In the late 1970s, Tmetuchl acquired the rock quarry on Malakal island from Hawaiian Rock. He helped fund the construction of the Seventh-day Adventist High School during this time. In 1983, Tmetuchl met the businessman Masao Nishizono in Japan, and they became business partners to build an airport terminal and hotel in Airai. Nishizono stopped construction for these projects in June 1984 and lawsuits delayed the opening of the Grace Hotel. Tmetuchl acquired this hotel after Nishizono committed suicide in 1990 and renamed it the Airai View Hotel. The hotel eventually opened in July 2000. In 1984, he built a private power plant in Airai with two electric generators, which he renovated after South Korean electrical engineers inspected it in 1996.

On March 4, 1985, Tmetuchl opened Palau's first local bank in Koror. While serving as governor of Airai in the 1980s, he led projects to create a clan house and four modern-style bais, or a men's meetinghouses. In 1986, he constructed twelve houses in an Airai hamlet using imported Chinese labor. He designed and constructed Airai State Elementary School, which he opened and dedicated on March 6, 1989.

Inspired by the Seventh-day Adventist Clinic on Guam, Tmetuchl funded the transformation of a building into a similar clinic. The clinic, located in the Ngerbeched hamlet of Koror, opened on May 26, 1991. In 1997, he led a construction project that built a Sabbath School building adjacent to the Seventh-day Adventist Church. His net worth during this year was estimated to be over $30 million. The next year he donated some of his land and money for the construction of a new Seventh-day Adventist Church in Ngchesar. He died in 1999 while the church was still under construction.

== Death and legacy ==
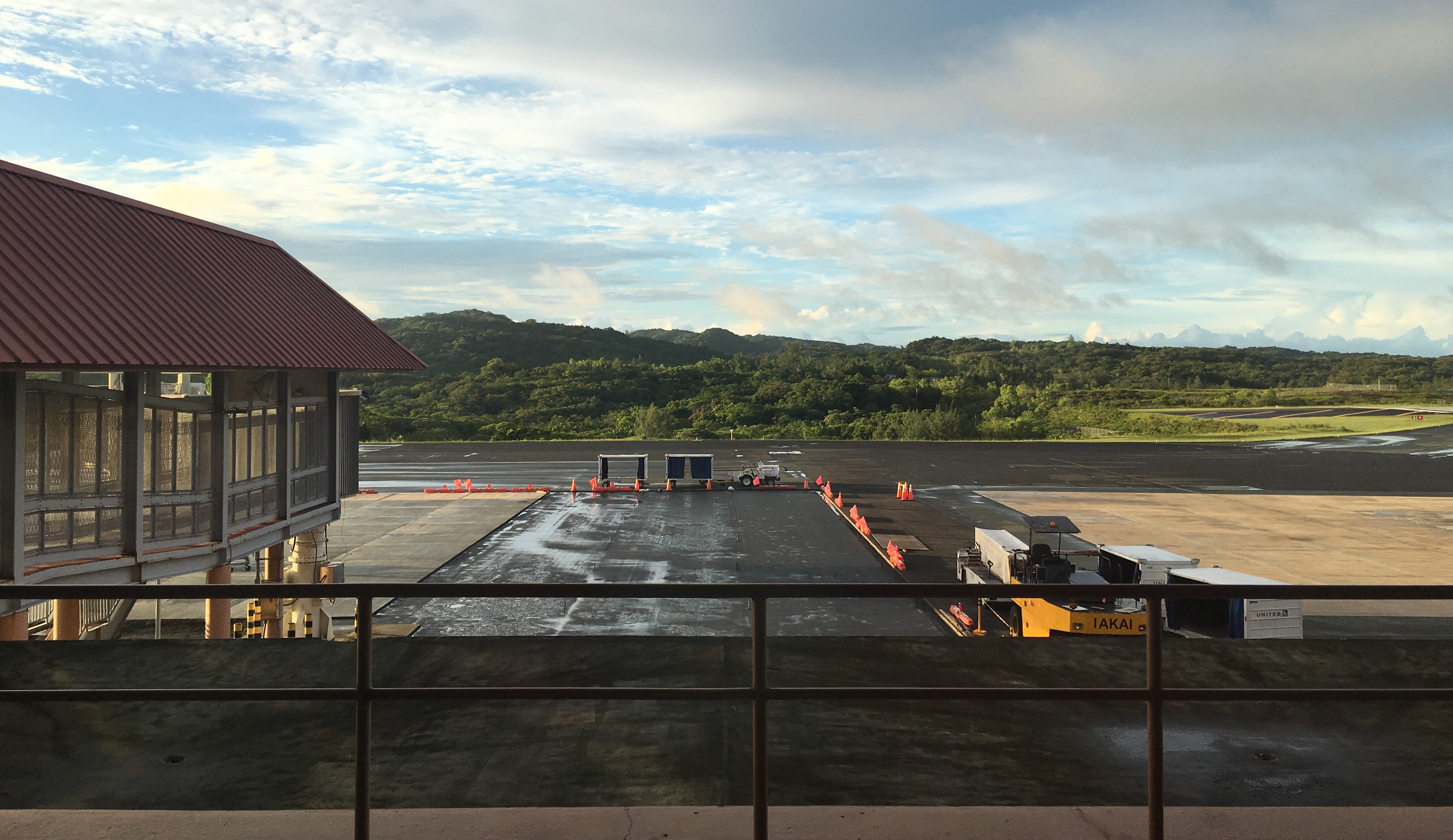
Runway of the Roman Tmetuchl International Airport

Roman Tmetuchl started feeling ill in January 1999. His health gradually declined in the following months and he died on July 1, 1999, of pancreatic cancer. He was a member of the Seventh-day Adventist Church and would read his Bible every day. The President of Palau, Kuniwo Nakamura, proclaimed a state of national mourning for Tmetuchl.

On April 11, 2006, Palauan senators Reklai, Koshiba, Seid, Diaz, and Dengokl on April 11, 2006, proposed to rename Palau International Airport as the Roman Tmetuchl International Airport. The senate passed this resolution on May 4, 2006, which stated that, "The Roman Tmetuchl International Airport is a fitting name for Palau's international airport due to Mr. Tmetuchl's numerous years of valuable services he provided to the Republic and for the assistance he provided in developing the airport." In 2008, the Tmetuchl family built a chapel at Belau National Hospital to honor and continue Roman's legacy.
