= Toshiro Tezuka =

- 手塚 敏郎
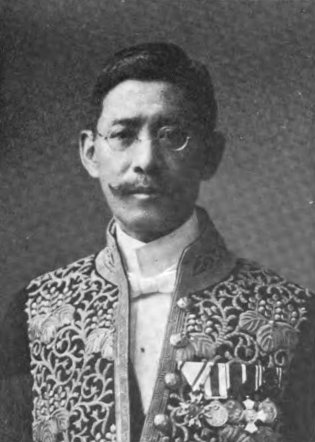

Governor of the South Seas Mandate
- In office 1 April 1922 – 4 April 1923
- Monarch: Taishō
- Preceded by: Office established
- Succeeded by: Gosuke Yokota

Personal details
- Born: 1 July 1873 Takanabe, Miyazaki, Japan
- Died: 26 October 1933 (aged 60)
- Education: Tokyo Imperial University

Toshiro Tezuka (手塚 敏郎, Tezuka Toshirō; 1 July 1873 – 26 October 1933) was a Japanese government official and prosecutor who was Director of the Department of Civil Affairs of the South Sea Agency from 1918 to 1922 and the first Governor of the South Seas Mandate from 1922 to 1923.

== Biography ==
Tezuka was born in Takanabe, Miyazaki Prefecture. In 1901, he graduated from Tokyo Imperial University Law School and became an assistant judicial officer. In 1903, he became a public prosecutor and served at the Hakodate Ward Court, the Hakodate District Court, the Sapporo District Court, and the Numazu Ward Court. In 1908, he was transferred to the Ministry of Home Affairs, and successively served as Fukui Prefectural Clerk and Police Chief, Nagasaki Prefectural Clerk and Police Chief, and Shimane Prefectural Home Affairs Director.

In 1918, he was appointed Chief of Naval Affairs and Chief of the Temporary Civil Affairs Department of the Interim Southern Islands Defense Unit, and took charge of the administration of the South Sea Islands.

In 1922, when the Interim Southern Islands Defense Unit was abolished and the South Sea Agency was established, he was appointed as its first director.

Preceded by Kojoro Nozaki as Commander of Interim Southern Islands Defense Unit	Head of Civil Affairs Bureau of the South Seas Mandate; 1918–1922	Succeeded by Himself as Governor
Preceded by Himself as Head of Civil Affairs Bureau	Governor of the South Seas Mandate; 1922–1923	Succeeded by Gosuke Yokota
