= Gosuke Yokota =

Governor of the South Seas Mandate

Junior Third Rank Gosuke Yokota
- 横田 郷助
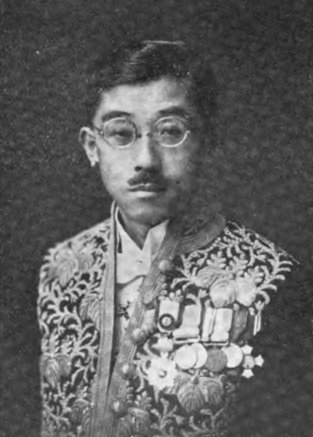

Governor of the South Seas Mandate
- In office 4 April 1923 – 11 October 1931
- Monarchs: Taishō; Hirohito
- Preceded by: Toshiro Tezuka
- Succeeded by: Mitsusada Horiguchi (acting); Tahara Kazuo

Personal details
- Born: 23 September 1880 Yoshiki, Yamaguchi, Japan
- Died: 11 October 1931 (aged 51) Koror, Palau Islands, Japan
- Education: Tokyo Imperial University

Gosuke Yokota (Japanese: 横田郷助; 23 September 1880 – 11 October 1931) was a Japanese government official who was the second Governor of the South Seas Mandate from 1923 until his death in 1931. He was from Yamaguchi Prefecture and graduated from Tokyo Imperial University. A bust of Yokota once stood in Palau, but went missing sometimes after the end of World War II.

Preceded by Toshiro Tezuka	Governor of the South Seas Mandate; 1923–1931	Succeeded by Mitsusada Horiguchi
