= Haruo Suekichi =

Haruo Suekichi, Suekichi Haruo (末吉 晴男, Suekichi Haruo), is a Tokyo based Japanese watchmaker who creates Steampunk styled watches.
