= 2000 Palauan general election =

- 7 November 2000
- Presidential election
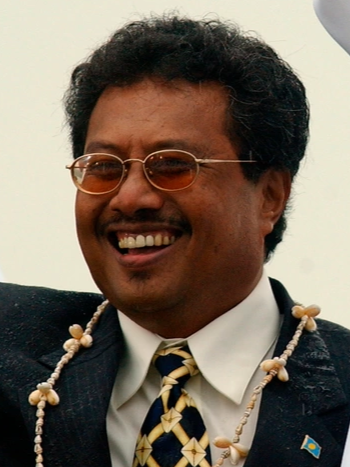

Candidate	Tommy Remengesau	Peter Sugiyama
Party	Independent	Independent
Popular vote	5,596	4,922
Percentage	53.20%	46.80%
President before election
Kuniwo Nakamura
Independent
Elected President
Tommy Remangesau
Independent

General elections were held in Palau on 7 November 2000. Thomas Remengesau Jr. was elected president, whilst Sandra Pierantozzi was elected vice president.

== Results ==
=== President ===
Candidate	Votes	%
Thomas Remengesau Jr.	5,596	53.20
Peter Sugiyama	4,922	46.80
Total	10,518	100.00
Valid votes	10,518	97.90
Invalid/blank votes	226	2.10
Total votes	10,744	100.00
Registered voters/turnout	13,239	81.15
Source: Psephos

=== Vice-President ===
Sandra Pierantozzi was elected vice president with 52% of the vote, defeating her nephew Alan Seid, who received 45% of the vote.

=== Senate ===
Party	Seats	+/–
Independents	9	–5
Total	9	–5
Source: IPU

=== House of Delegates ===
Party	Seats	+/–
Independents	16	0
Total	16	0
Source: IPU
