= Nagata Yasujirō =

- 永田 泰次郎
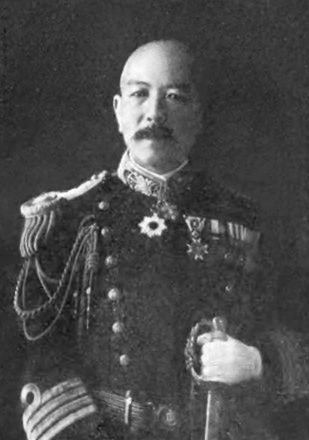
- Born: January 26, 1867; Edo, Japan
- Died: January 19, 1923 (aged 55)
- Military career
- Allegiance: Empire of Japan
- Branch: Imperial Japanese Navy
- Service years: 1886–1923
- Rank: Vice Admiral
- Conflicts: Russo-Japanese War; World War I

Nagata Yasujirō (永田 泰次郎; January 26, 1867 – January 19, 1923) was a Japanese admiral who was Commander of the Interim Southern Islands Defense Unit from 1917 to 1919.

== Biography ==
Nagata was born in Edo (present-day Tokyo) where his father was a samurai. After attending the preparatory school Keio University he graduated from the 15th class of the Imperial Japanese Naval Academy in 1886. His classmates was the future Prime Minister Okada Keisuke and admirals Takeshita Isamu and Takarabe Takeshi. He was commissioned as a lieutenant on February 20, 1895, and served as chief torpedo officer on the cruisers Hiei, Chiyoda, and Yoshino in 1899.

He received his first command, that of the destroyer Usugumo on June 22, 1900. In September of the same year, he was promoted to lieutenant commander and reassigned as naval adjutant to the Government-General of Taiwan, serving in Taiwan to March 1902. He served in a number of staff positions, and was subsequently promoted to commander on January 12, 1905. During the Russo-Japanese War, he was Admiral Tōgō Heihachirō's liaison with the civilian government in Tokyo.

He returned to sea in 1907 as executive officer on the cruiser Yakumo followed by the Iwami, and after commanding a number of destroyer squadrons was promoted to captain on October 11, 1909. He served as chief-of-staff of the Ōminato Guard District from December 1910 to December 1911, was captain of the cruiser Chiyoda from December 1911 to June 1912, and of the battlecruiser Kurama from June 1912 to December 1913. He was then assigned as chief-of-staff of the Maizuru Naval District to December 1914. With the start of World War I, Nagata was captain of the battleship Settsu from December 1914 until his promotion to rear admiral and reassignment as chief-of-staff of the IJN 2nd Fleet in December 1915. From December 1916 to 1917 he was chief-of-staff of the Yokosuka Naval District. Nagata served as Commander of the Interim Southern Islands Defense Unit from December 1917 to December 1919. He was promoted to vice admiral on December 1, 1919 and went on the reserve list in August 1920. He served as headmaster of the Kobe College of Mercantile Marine until his death in 1923.

== Honors ==
- 1901 - Order of the Sacred Treasure, 5th class
- 1906 - Order of the Rising Sun, 3rd class
- 1906 - Order of the Golden Kite, 3rd class

Preceded by Masujiro Yoshida	Commander of Interim Southern Islands Defense Unit; 1917–1919	Succeeded by Kojūrō Nozaki
