= 1992 Palauan general election =

- 22 September 1992 (first round); 4 November 1992 (second round)
- Presidential election
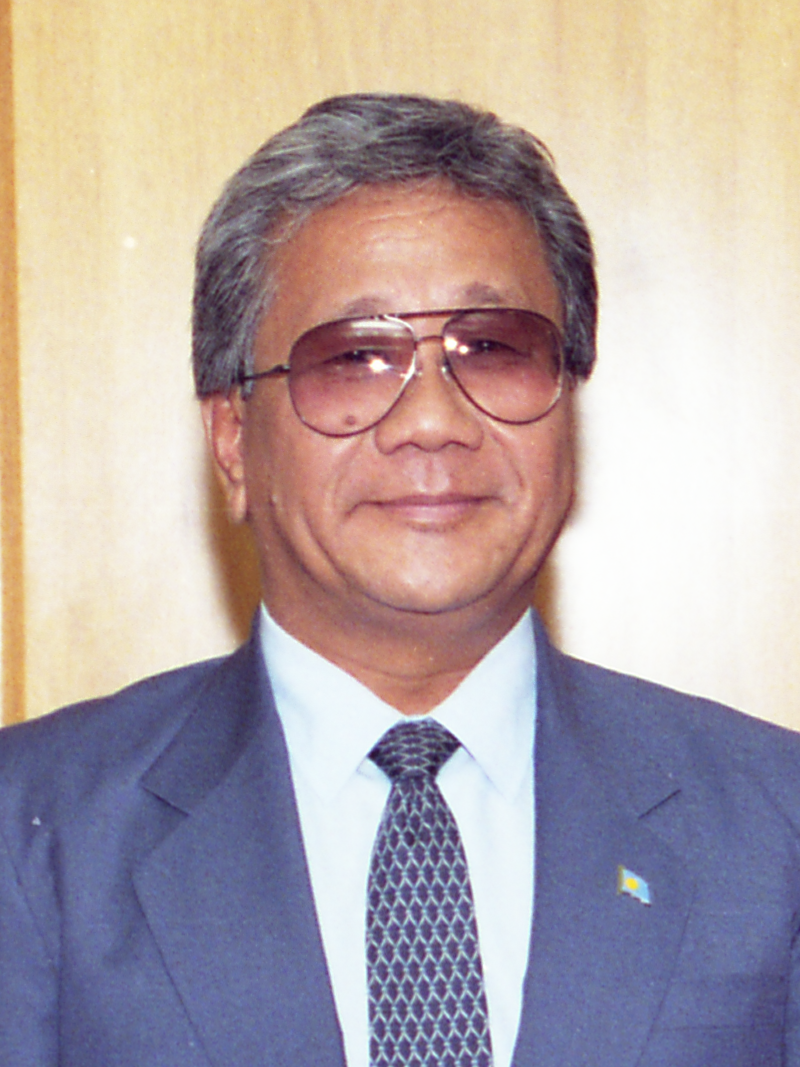

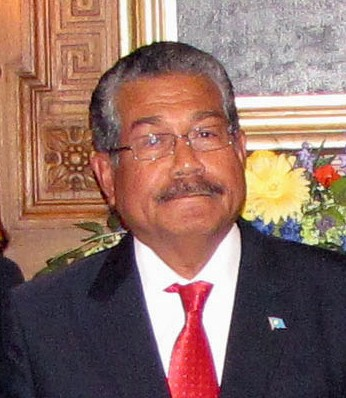
Candidate	Kuniwo Nakamura	Johnson Toribiong
Party	Independent	Independent
Popular vote	4,841	4,707
Percentage	50.70%	49.30%
president before election
Ngiratkel Etpison
Independent
Elected president
Kuniwo Nakamura
Independent
- Vice presidential election
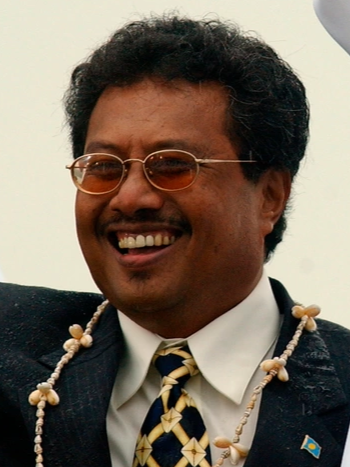

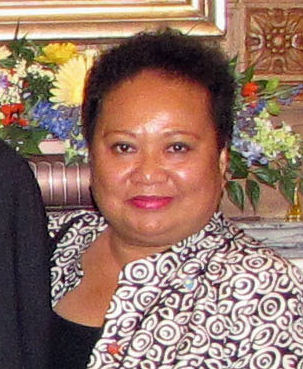
Candidate	Thomas Remengesau Jr.	Sandra Pierantozzi
Party	Independent	Independent
Popular vote	4,805	4,485
Percentage	51.72%	48.28%
Vice President before election
Kuniwo Nakamura
Independent
Elected Vice President
Thomas Remengesau Jr.
Independent

General elections were held in Palau in 1992 to elect a President, Vice-President, Senate and House of Delegates. The first round of the presidential election took place on 22 September, whilst the run-off election and the election for the House of Delegates and Senate took place on 4 November. All candidates ran as independents. Despite finishing second in the first round of voting, Kuniwo Nakamura was elected President, whilst Thomas Remengesau Jr. won the election for Vice-President. Voter turnout was 74.3% in the presidential elections on 22 September and 83.9% on 4 November, and 83.2% for the legislative elections.

== Results ==
=== President ===
Candidate	First round		Second round	
Candidate	Votes	%	Votes	%
Johnson Toribiong	3,191	37.80	4,707	49.30
Kuniwo Nakamura	3,138	37.18	4,841	50.70
Ngiratkel Etpison	2,089	24.75		
Write-ins	23	0.27		
Total	8,441	100.00	9,548	100.00
Valid votes	8,441	99.18	9,548	98.41
Invalid/blank votes	70	0.82	154	1.59
Total votes	8,511	100.00	9,702	100.00
Registered voters/turnout	11,457	74.29	11,568	83.87
Source: Nohlen et al.

=== Vice-President ===
Candidate	First round		Second round	
Candidate	Votes	%	Votes	%
Thomas Remengesau Jr.	2,832	33.84	4,805	51.72
Sandra Pierantozzi	2,038	24.35	4,485	48.28
Minoru Ueki	1,861	22.23		
Moses Uludong	1,632	19.50		
Write-ins	7	0.08		
Total	8,370	100.00	9,290	100.00
Valid votes	8,370	98.34	9,290	95.75
Invalid/blank votes	141	1.66	412	4.25
Total votes	8,511	100.00	9,702	100.00
Registered voters/turnout	11,457	74.29	11,568	83.87
Source: Nohlen et al.

=== Senate ===
Party	Votes	%	Seats	+/–
Independents	9,504	100.00	14	0
Total	9,504	100.00	14	0
Valid votes	9,504	97.96		
Invalid/blank votes	198	2.04		
Total votes	9,702	100.00		
Registered voters/turnout	11,658	83.22		
Source: Nohlen et al.

=== House of Delegates ===
Party	Votes	%	Seats	+/–
Independents	8,615	100.00	16	0
Total	8,615	100.00	16	0
Valid votes	8,615	88.80		
Invalid/blank votes	1,087	11.20		
Total votes	9,702	100.00		
Registered voters/turnout	11,658	83.22		
Source: Nohlen et al.
