= Ngiratkel Etpison =

President of Palau

His Excellency Ngiratkel Etpison

5th President of Palau
- In office 1 January 1989 – 1 January 1993
- Vice President: Kuniwo Nakamura
- Preceded by: Thomas Remengesau Sr.
- Succeeded by: Kuniwo Nakamura

Personal details
- Born: 3 May 1924 Koror, South Seas Mandate (present day Palau)
- Died: 1 August 1997 (aged 73) Riverside, California, United States
- Party: Independent
- Children: 2

Ngiratkel Etpison (3 May 1924 – 1 August 1997) was a politician and businessman from Palau. Etpison was elected President in 1988 and served from 1989 until 1993, becoming the country’s first elected president to serve a full term in office.

== Election ==
Before the 1988 elections, Etpison was a businessman and governor of Ngatpang State with limited political experience. He did not speak English.

He was elected the country's president in the 1988 elections, the final elections conducted under a plurality voting system, in which he received just 26% of the votes cast, defeating opponent Roman Tmetuchl by a margin of 31 votes. The near-tie led elections in Palau to be reformed, and after that they were conducted under majority voting, with a second round if no candidate received more than half of all votes cast. He served from 1 January 1989 to 1 January 1993. He ran again in the 1992 elections, but attracted just 2,084 votes compared to rivals Johnson Toribiong with 3,188 votes and Kuniwo Nakamura with 3,125 votes.

== Presidency ==
Ngiratkel Etpison was the first president that survived his entire presidency. (Haruo Remeliik was murdered and Lazarus Salii committed suicide by shooting, both while in office.)

While in office, Etpison proposed a request to the United States of America to grant Palau independence from its 43-year U.N. trusteeship. Because of the Palauan constitutional requirement of achieving a 75% majority vote, the initial proposal was overturned. This proposal would later develop into the Compact of Free Association, an agreement with the United States that would grant independence to the Republic of Palau. The Compact of Free Association was approved by the United States in 1994 under Kuniwo Nakamura after negotiating a 50-year stimulus plan to support Palau's founding of its new Republic in exchange for military assets in land.

== Business work ==
Ngiratkel Etpison founded the NECO group of companies in 1945. He started by using a Japanese scrapped generator to make ice candy, later becoming one of the prominent businessmen of Palau. He started the first tourist and sightseeing business in the 1970s, and in 1984 opened Palau Pacific Resort, Palau's most luxurious beach resort.

== Personal life ==
Etpison was the Rekemesik of Ngatpang. He died on Aug 1, 1997 in California, United States. The Etpison Museum opened in August 1999 and was built by his children, Shallum and Mandy Etpison.

Political offices
Preceded by Thomas Remengesau Sr.	President of Palau; 1989–1993	Succeeded by Kuniwo Nakamura
