= Thomas Remengesau Sr. =

President of Palau

His Excellency Thomas Remengesau Sr.
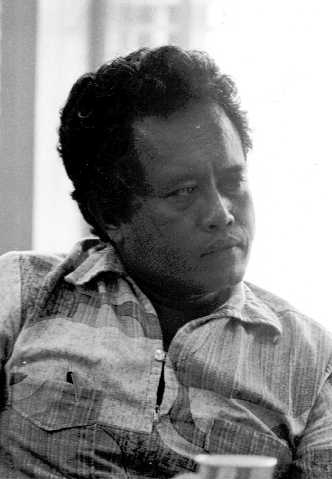

4th President of Palau
- In office 20 August 1988 – 1 January 1989
- Vice President: Vacant
- Preceded by: Lazarus Salii
- Succeeded by: Ngiratkel Etpison
- Acting; 30 June 1985 – 2 July 1985
- Preceded by: Haruo Remeliik
- Succeeded by: Alfonso Oiterong

2nd Vice President of Palau
- In office 25 October 1985 – 20 August 1988
- President: Lazarus Salii
- Preceded by: Alfonso Oiterong
- Succeeded by: Kuniwo Nakamura

1st Justice Minister of Palau
- In office 1981 – 1 January 1989
- President: Haruo Remeliik; Alfonso Oiterong; Lazarus Salii
- Preceded by: Position established
- Succeeded by: Kuniwo Nakamura

Personal details
- Born: Thomas Ongelibel Remengasau; 28 November 1929 Koror, South Seas Mandate (now Palau)
- Died: 3 August 2019 (aged 89) Koror, Palau
- Party: Independent
- Spouse: Ferista Esang
- Children: 7, including Thomas Jr. and Valerie
- Relatives: Surangel Whipps Jr. (son-in-law); Surangel Whipps Sr. (affinal)

Thomas Ongelibel Remengesau (28 November 1929 – 3 August 2019), also known as Thomas Remengesau Sr., was a politician in Palau. He was Vice President of Palau from 1985 to 1988, and acting President of Palau in 1985 and President of Palau from 1988 to 1989 following the violent deaths of two previous presidents.

When President Haruo Remeliik was assassinated in June 1985, Vice President Oiterong returned from New York City to Palau on 2 July to take office of the President. Between these dates Minister of Justice Remengesau served as acting President until 2 July 1985.

Remengesau was elected as Vice President in the special election in August 1985. After the shooting of President Lazarus Salii in August 1988, Remengesau became the President of Palau until Ngiratkel Etpison was sworn in January 1989. He was the Maderngebuked of Ngaraard.

== Family ==
Remengesau was married to Ferista Esang Remengesau, who served as First Lady of Palau during her husband's brief terms as President. They had eight children. Their eldest child is Thomas Remengesau Jr., who was President of Palau from 2001 to 2009 and from 2013 to 2021. Valerie Whipps, daughter of Thomas Sr. and Ferista Esang Remengesau married Surangel Whipps Jr., a businessman and current President of Palau. Remengesau died on 3 August 2019, aged 89 during his son's last presidential term.

Political offices
New title	Justice Minister of Palau; 1981–1989	Succeeded by Kuniwo Nakamura
Preceded by Haruo Remeliik	Acting President of Palau; 1985	Succeeded by Alfonso Oiterong
Preceded by Alfonso Oiterong	Vice President of Palau; 1985–1988	Succeeded by Kuniwo Nakamura
Preceded by Lazarus Salii	President of Palau; 1988–1989	Succeeded by Ngiratkel Etpison
