= Kuniwo Nakamura =

Palauan politician (1943–2020)

His Excellency Kuniwo Nakamura
- 中村國雄
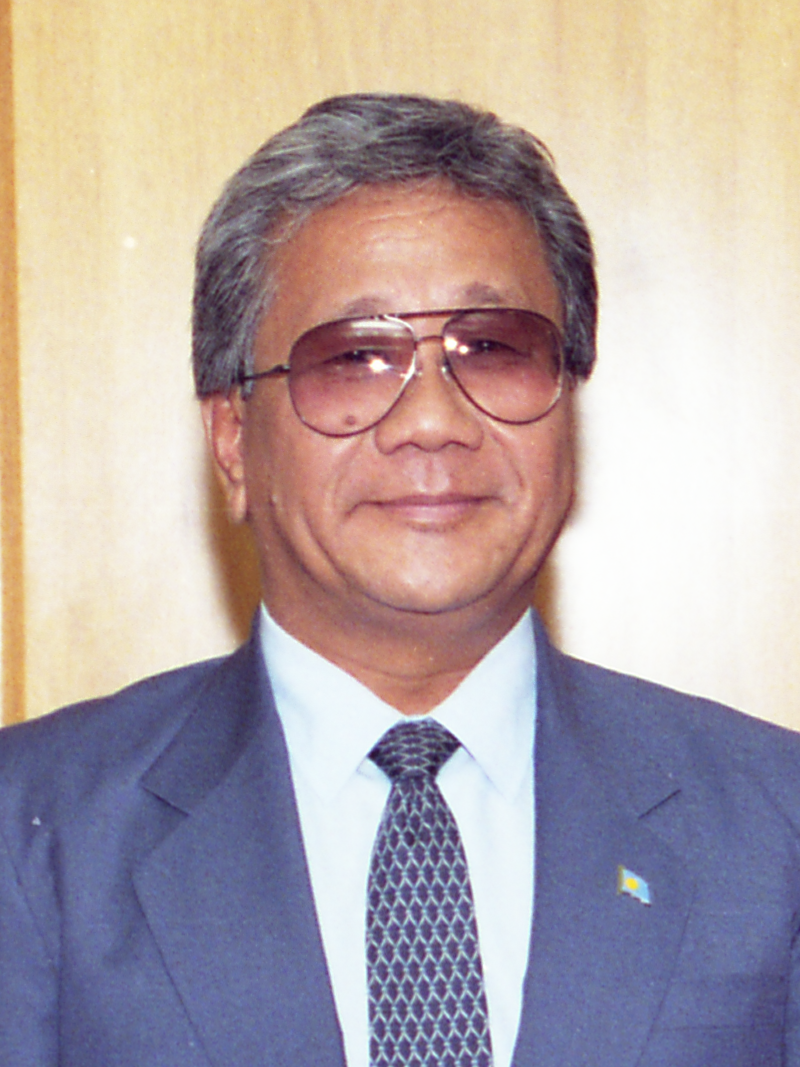
- Nakamura in 1994

6th President of Palau
- In office 1 January 1993 – 1 January 2001
- Vice President: Tommy Remengesau
- Preceded by: Ngiratkel Etpison
- Succeeded by: Tommy Remengesau

3rd Vice President of Palau
- In office 1 January 1989 – 1 January 1993
- President: Ngiratkel Etpison
- Preceded by: Thomas Remengesau Sr.
- Succeeded by: Tommy Remengesau

Justice Minister of Palau
- In office 1992 – 1 January 1993
- President: Ngiratkel Etpison
- Preceded by: Vacant, held by Ngiratkel Etpison
- Succeeded by: Salvador Ingereklii

Minister of Administration of Palau
- In office January 1989 – 1992
- President: Ngiratkel Etpison
- Preceded by: Franz Reksid
- Succeeded by: Sandra Pierantozzi

Personal details
- Born: 24 November 1943 Peleliu, South Seas Mandate
- Died: 14 October 2020 (aged 76) Koror, Palau
- Spouse: Elong Nakamura
- Relatives: Mamoru Nakamura (brother)

Kuniwo Nakamura (中村國雄, Nakamura Kunio; 24 November 1943 – 14 October 2020) was a Palauan politician who served as the president of Palau from 1993 to 2001. He had earlier served as vice president of Palau from 1989 to 1993, under Ngiratkel Etpison.

== Background and early life ==
Nakamura was the son of a Japanese immigrant from Matsusaka, Ise Province, and a Palauan chieftain's daughter. He was studying in his second year of primary school when the surrender of Japan ended World War II. He graduated from high school under the U.S. occupation of Palau and went on to study at the University of Hawaii.

== Personal life and death ==
Nakamura was married to his wife Elong Nakamura for over 50 years. They had children. Elong later died on 17 November 2018 at the age of 71. His brother, Mamoru Nakamura, was named chief justice of Palau in 1981.

Nakamura died on 14 October 2020 at the age of 76.

== Career ==
Nakamura began his political career at the age of 28, becoming the youngest person to be elected to the Congress of Micronesia. He was elected to the Senate of Palau in 1980. He served as Vice-President from January 1989 to January 1993. He held the additional role of Minister of Administration from 1989 to 1992, when President Ngiratkel Etpison appointed other members of the cabinet. At that time Nakamura was appointed to the additional role of Minister of Justice.

Nakamura was first elected president in the 1992 elections; he attracted 3,125 votes, versus 2,084 for one-term incumbent Ngiratkel Etpison and 3,188 for rival Johnson Toribiong, and then went on to defeat Toribiong in the runoff. He served two terms, being re-elected in 1996 by a 64%-36% margin over Ibedul Yutaka Gibbons. He did not run in the 2000 elections, but backed his vice-president Tommy Remengesau, who emerged victorious by a 53%-47% margin against senator Peter Sugiyama.

== Honors ==
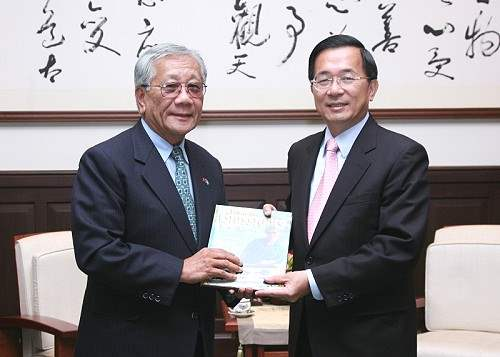
Nakamura meeting with Taiwanese President Chen Shui-bian in 2007.

In December 2021, the Taiwanese government paid for a statue of him in Peleliu for his role in establishing Palau–Taiwan relations.

Political offices
Preceded by Thomas Remengesau Sr.	Justice Minister of Palau; 1992-1993	Succeeded by Salvador Ingereklii
Preceded by Thomas Remengesau Sr.	Vice-President of Palau; 1989–1993	Succeeded by Thomas Remengesau Jr.
Preceded by Ngiratkel Etpison	President of Palau; 1993–2001	Succeeded by Thomas Remengesau Jr.
