= Haruo Remeliik =

First President of Palau

His Excellency Haruo Remeliik
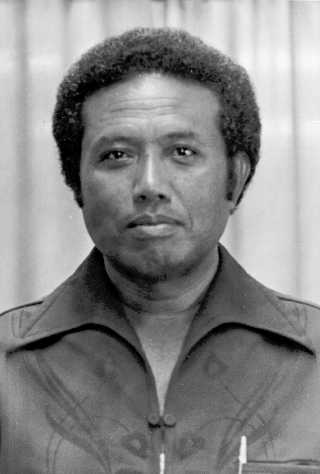
- Taken around 1976

1st President of Palau
- In office 2 March 1981 – 30 June 1985
- Vice President: Alfonso Oiterong
- Preceded by: Office established
- Succeeded by: Thomas Remengesau Sr. (acting)

Personal details
- Born: Haruo Ignacio Remeliik; 1 June 1931 Peleliu, South Seas Mandate (present day Palau)
- Died: 30 June 1985 (aged 54) Koror, Palau
- Cause of death: Assassination by gunshots
- Party: Independent
- Spouse: Regina Remeliik

Haruo Ignacio Remeliik (1 June 1931 – 30 June 1985) was the first President of Palau from 2 March 1981 until his assassination on 30 June 1985. He is buried at Kloulklubed in his home state of Peleliu. Remeliik was of mixed Japanese and Palauan descent.

== Early life ==
Remeliik studied priesthood in Truk. Later he returned to Palau and became an associate judge. In 1968, he won a seat in Palau legislature and became vice speaker. In 1970 he was appointed as deputy district administrator for the Palau district of the Trust Territory of the Pacific Islands.

== Presidency ==
Remeliik was elected president of the Palau Constitutional Convention. He was elected as president of Palau in the 1980 election and reelected in 1984.

A group of government workers fire bombed Remeliik's office in 1981 after he refused to negotiate a salary increase. He declared a 10 day state of emergency during a work stoppage in 1982, in order to force government employees to return to work.

== Death ==
Remeliik and Inawo was shot in the driveway of his home by an unidentified gunman. Six months after the killing, two relatives of Roman Tmetuchl and another man were arrested in connection to the killing; however, they were later released. The case went through two different U.S.-based prosecutors before being tried in 1997. In March 2000, former presidential candidate and convicted felon John O. Ngiraked claimed responsibility for the conspiracy to kill Remeliik. Persistent allegations that Remeliik was killed by the CIA due to his firm anti-nuclear stance have continued after the trial and Ngiraked's confession.

Lazarus Salii was elected to fill the remainder of Remeliik's term as president.

== Works cited ==
- Gerston, Larry (1988). "Palau: trouble in paradise". New Zealand International Review. 13 (6). New Zealand Institute of International Affairs: 10–15. doi:10.2307/45233817. JSTOR 45233817.
- Shuster, Donald (1992). "The Last Trusteeship - Island of Opportunists: A Personal View of the Republic of Belau". The Journal of Pacific History. 27 (1). Taylor & Francis: 73–82. doi:10.2307/25169107. JSTOR 25169107.

Political offices
| Preceded by New office | President of Palau; 1981–1985 | Succeeded by Thomas Remengesau Sr. |
