= Alfonso Oiterong =

President of Palau

His Excellency Alfonso Oiterong
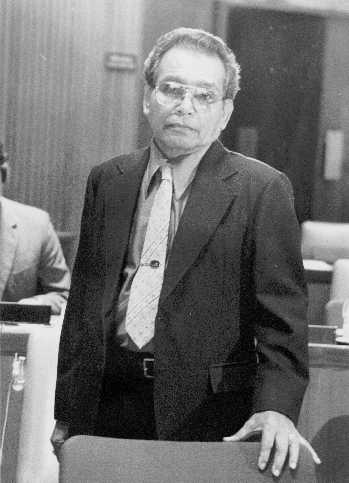
- Oiterong in 1984

2nd President of Palau
- In office 2 July 1985 – 25 October 1985
- Vice President: Vacant
- Preceded by: Haruo Remeliik; Thomas Remengesau Sr. (acting)
- Succeeded by: Lazarus Salii

1st Vice President of Palau
- In office 2 March 1981 – 30 June 1985
- President: Haruo Remeliik
- Preceded by: Office established
- Succeeded by: Thomas Remengesau Sr.

Personal details
- Born: Alfonso Rebochong Oiterong; 9 October 1924 Aimeliik, South Seas Mandate (present day Palau)
- Died: 30 August 1994 (aged 69)
- Party: Independent

Alfonso Rebochong Oiterong (9 October 1924 – 30 August 1994) was a politician from Palau who served as the country's Vice President from 1981 to 1985. Despite internal problems in Palau during the Remeliik administration, Oiterong was perceived as an honest, capable and dedicated civil servant. In addition of the vice presidential post, he was the minister of state aka minister of foreign affairs.

When President Haruo Remeliik was assassinated, Oiterong returned from New York to Palau on 2 July to take office of the President. He served as President from 2 July to 25 October 1985. Oiterong lost the 1985 special election to Lazarus Salii.

Political offices
Preceded by New office	Vice-President of Palau; 1981–1985	Succeeded by Thomas Remengesau Sr.
Preceded by Thomas Remengesau Sr. (acting)	President of Palau; 1985	Succeeded by Lazarus Salii
