= Lazarus Salii =

Palauan politician

His Excellency Lazarus Salii
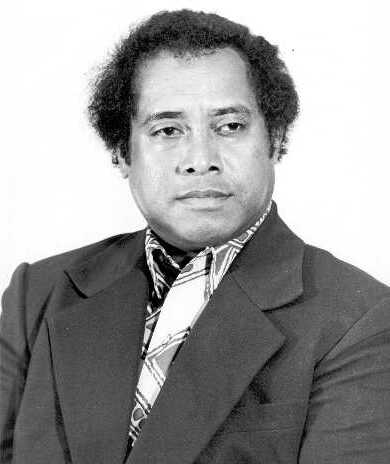

3rd President of Palau
- In office 25 October 1985 – 20 August 1988
- Vice President: Thomas Remengesau Sr.
- Preceded by: Alfonso Oiterong
- Succeeded by: Thomas Remengesau Sr.

Personal details
- Born: Lazarus Eitaro Salii; 17 November 1936 Angaur, South Seas Mandate (present day Palau)
- Died: 20 August 1988 (aged 51) Koror, Palau
- Cause of death: Suicide
- Party: Ta Belau
- Spouse: Tina Salii
- Relatives: Carlos Salii (brother)

Lazarus Eitaro Salii (17 November 1936 – 20 August 1988) was a politician from Palau. He served as the second elected President of Palau from 25 October 1985 until his death by suicide on 20 August 1988, following accusations of corruption.

Salii was elected to the Senate of Micronesian Congress. He was involved in the Palau Constitutional Convention of 1978. After the Constitution took effect in 1981, he became an ambassador. As ambassador, he was given wide-ranging authority to negotiate with the U.S. ambassador. He was ambassador until 1984, when he became a senator, representing Koror in the Palau National Congress.

When President Haruo Remeliik was assassinated on 30 June 1985, Salii was elected in August to finish his term of office (although Thomas Remengesau and then Alfonso Oiterong served in the interim). Following his suicide by gunshot in 1988, he was succeeded by Vice President Remengesau as president for the remainder of his term, followed by Ngiratkel Etpison as the fifth president.

He was the elder brother of Carlos Salii.

Political offices
Preceded by Alfonso Oiterong	President of Palau; 1985–1988	Succeeded by Thomas Remengesau Sr.
