= Japanese cruiser Tama =

Kuma-class light cruiser of the Imperial Japanese Navy during World War II

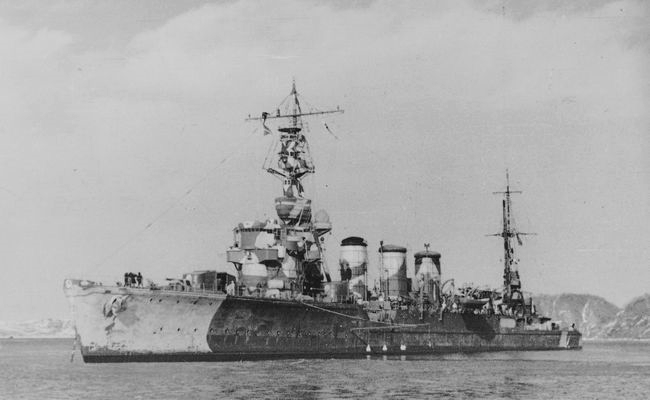
- Tama in the Aleutians Campaign, 1942.

History

Empire of Japan
- Name: Tama
- Namesake: Tama River
- Ordered: 1917 Fiscal Year
- Builder: Mitsubishi Heavy Industries, Nagasaki
- Cost: 6,915,078 JPY
- Laid down: 10 August 1918
- Launched: 10 February 1920
- Commissioned: 29 January 1921
- Stricken: 20 December 1944
- Fate: Sunk northeast of Luzon, 25 October 1944

General characteristics
- Class & type: Kuma-class light cruiser
- Displacement: 5,100 long tons (5,182 t) (standard)
- Length: 152.4 m (500 ft)
- Beam: 14.2 m (47 ft)
- Draft: 4.8 m (16 ft)
- Installed power: 90,000 shp (67,000 kW)
- Propulsion: 4 × Gihon geared steam turbines; 12 × Kampon boilers; 4 × shafts
- Speed: 36 kn (67 km/h; 41 mph)
- Range: 5,000 nmi (9,300 km; 5,800 mi) at 14 kn (26 km/h; 16 mph)
- Complement: 450
- Armament: 7 × 14 cm/50 3rd Year Type naval guns; 2 × 8 cm/40 3rd Year Type naval guns; 8 × 533 mm (21.0 in) torpedo tubes; 48 × naval mines
- Armor: Belt: 64 mm (3 in); Deck: 29 mm (1 in)
- Aircraft carried: 1 × floatplane
- Aviation facilities: 1 × catapult

Tama (多摩) was the second of the five Kuma-class light cruisers in the Imperial Japanese Navy, which played an active role in World War II. Tama was named after the Tama River in Kantō region of Japan.

== Background ==
After the construction of the Tenryū-class cruiser, the demerits of the small cruiser concept became apparent. At the end of 1917, plans for an additional six Tenryū-class vessels, plus three new-design 7,200 ton-class scouting cruisers were shelved, in favor of an intermediate 5,500 ton-class vessel which could be used as both a long-range, high speed scout ship, and also as a command vessel for destroyer or submarine flotillas.

== Design ==
The Kuma-class vessels were essentially enlarged versions of the Tenryū-class cruisers, with greater speed, range, and weaponry. With improvements in geared-turbine engine technology, the Kuma-class vessels were capable of the high speed of 36 knots (67 km/h), and a range of 9,000 nmi (17,000 km) at 10 kn (12 mph; 19 km/h). The number of 14 cm/50 3rd Year Type naval guns was increased from three on the Tenryū class to seven on the Kuma class and provision was made for 48 naval mines. However, the two triple torpedo launchers on the Tenryū class was reduced to two double launchers, and the Kuma class remained highly deficient in anti-aircraft protection, with only two 8 cm/40 3rd Year Type naval guns.

== Service record ==
=== Early career ===
Tama was completed at Mitsubishi Heavy Industries Nagasaki shipyard on 29 January 1921. Immediately after commissioning, Tama was assigned to cover the landings of Japanese troops in Siberia during Japan's Siberian Intervention against the Bolshevik Red Army.

In 1925, Tama was tasked with making a diplomatic voyage to San Pedro in the United States, to return the remains of US Ambassador to Japan, Edgar Bancroft, who had died in Tokyo.

In 1932, with the Manchurian Incident, Tama was assigned to patrol the northern coasts of China, from its base in Taiwan. As the war in China continued to escalate, Tama was involved in operations to cover the landings of Japanese troops in central China.

On 10 January 1935, the German naval attaché in Tokyo, Captain Paul Wenneker was invited by Admiral Nobumasa Suetsugu to tour Tama, the battleship Kongō and the submarine I-2 at Yokosuka Naval District. Wenneker was reportedly unimpressed with Japanese naval artillery and advocated increased use of submarine warfare.

=== Northern operations ===
On 10 September 1941, Tama became flagship of Vice Admiral Boshirō Hosogaya's CruDiv 21 with the light cruiser Kiso, in the IJN 5th Fleet. Tama and Kiso were sent north to Hokkaidō, in Arctic white camouflage on 2 December, and were patrolling in the Kurile Islands, at the time of the attack on Pearl Harbor. Both cruisers' hulls were damaged by severe weather, and both were forced to return to dry dock at Yokosuka by the end of the year.

On 21 January 1942, CruDiv 21 departed Yokosuka and was again sent north on patrols around Hokkaidō, but was recalled after 38 aircraft of Task Force 16 (USS Enterprise) made a dawn raid on Marcus Island on 5 March. Tama was assigned to the IJN 1st Fleet with battleships Hyūga and Ise, and sortied from Hashirajima to search for Admiral William F Halsey, but failed to locate his forces after several weeks of searching. On 5 April, CruDiv 21 returned to northern waters, but on 18 April the Doolittle Raid struck targets in Tokyo, Yokohama, Osaka, Nagoya and Kobe. Tama was again recalled to join in another unsuccessful pursuit of Halsey. For the rest of April and most of May, Tama resumed its northern patrols.

On 28 May, Tama departed Mutsu Bay to participate in the "Operation AL" (the seizure of Attu and Kiska) in the Battle of the Aleutian Islands. After successfully landing forces to seize the islands, CruDiv 21 returned to Mutsu Bay on 23 June. However, Tama was quickly sent back to cover the second reinforcement convoy to Kiska, then patrolled southwest of Kiska in anticipation of an American counter-attack until 2 August. After a brief return to Yokosuka for maintenance, Tama covered the transfer of the Attu garrison to Kiska. On 25 October, CruDiv 21 embarked further reinforcements at Kashiwabara, Paramushiro to Attu. Tama continued to patrol the Aleutians and the Kurile islands and around Hokkaidō until 6 January 1943, making another supply run to Kiska in November. After refit at Yokosuka in early February 1943, Tama again patrolled north from Ōminato Guard District to Kataoka (Simushir island), to Kashiwabara (Paramushiro) to 7 March. Another major supply run to Attu was made from 7–13 March.

On 23 March, Tama departed Paramushiro towards Attu with Vice Admiral Hosogaya's IJN Fifth Fleet cruisers Nachi and Maya, light cruiser Abukuma and destroyers Ikazuchi, Inazuma, Usugumo, Hatsushimo and Wakaba escorting a three-ship reinforcement carrying troops and supplies for the garrison on Attu. At the Battle of the Komandorski Islands on 26 March, against USN Task Group 16.6 with the light cruiser USS Richmond, heavy cruiser Salt Lake City and four destroyers, in a four-hour running gun and torpedo battle, Salt Lake City and destroyer Bailey were damaged by gunfire. The other destroyers were not damaged. During the battle, Tama fired 136 shells and four torpedoes, and received two hits in return, which damaged her catapult and wounding one crewman, however Nachi was hit several times; and the Japanese aborted the resupply mission, returning to Paramushiro on 28 March. Disgraced by retreating from an inferior force, Hosogaya was relieved of command and forced to retire. Vice Admiral Shiro Kawase assumed command of the Fifth Fleet. Tama remained on guard duty at Kataoka for over a month and then was sent to Maizuru Naval Arsenal for a refit on 4 May. She was thus absent during the "American Operation Landcrab" to retake the Aleutian Islands, and during Japanese evacuation of Kiska on 19 May. Returning to Kataoka only on 23 May, Tama resumed guard duties until 5 July. During "Operation Ke-Go" (the evacuation of Kiska) on 7 July, Tama's engines were considered too unreliable for her to participate directly in the evacuation, and she remained behind at Paramushiro. In any event, the mission was aborted due to weather. Tama remained on guard duty in the Kuriles until 30 August.

=== Operations in southern waters ===
After a refit at Yokosuka Naval Arsenal, Tama was sent south with troops and supplies for Ponape, Caroline Islands on 15 September. After stopping by Truk, and returning to Kure, Tama was ordered to Shanghai on 11 October, to ferry additional troops to Truk and Rabaul, New Britain. After disembarking the reinforcements at Rabaul, she was attacked by Royal Australian Air Force Bristol Beaufort bombers from Guadalcanal on 21 October. Tama's hull plates were damaged by near-misses and she was forced return to Rabaul for emergency repairs.

On 27 October, Tama returned to Yokosuka for a major refit; her Nos. 5 and No.7 140 mm guns were removed along with her aircraft catapult and derrick. A twin 127 mm HA gun was fitted, as were four triple mount and six single mount Type 96 25 mm AA guns. This brought Tama's total number of 25 mm guns to 22 barrels (4x3, 2x2, 6x1). A type 21 air search radar was also fitted. Repairs and modifications were completed on 9 December.

Tama departed Yokosuka on 24 December, again for northern waters, and remained on patrol until 19 June 1944. Returning to Yokosuka by 22 June, Tama then began operations to ferry Imperial Japanese Army reinforcements to the Ogasawara islands, making two runs to 12 August.

On 30 August, Tama was transferred from CruDiv 21, Fifth Fleet to become flagship of DesRon 11, Combined Fleet, replacing the lost Nagara.

=== Battle of Leyte Gulf ===
During the Battle of Leyte Gulf (20 October 1944), Tama was assigned to Vice Admiral Jisaburō Ozawa Northern Mobile ("Decoy") Force. During the Battle off Cape Engaño (25 October), Ozawa's force was attacked by Task Force 38, with USS Enterprise, Essex, Intrepid, Franklin, Lexington, Independence, Belleau Wood, Langley, Cabot and San Jacinto. Tama was attacked by TBM Avenger torpedo bombers from VT-21 of Belleau Wood and VT-51 from San Jacinto. A Mark 13 torpedo hit Tama in her No. 2 boiler room. After emergency repairs, Tama retired from the battle, escorted by the cruiser Isuzu, but Isuzu was ordered to protect the damaged aircraft carrier Chiyoda. Tama was then escorted by destroyer Shimotsuki, but later Shimotsuki too was ordered off to assist the damaged carrier Zuihō. Tama proceeded alone at 14 kn (26 km/h; 16 mph) towards Okinawa.

Northeast of Luzon, Tama's luck ran out, as the submarine USS Jallao — on her first war patrol — picked up Tama on radar. Her attack of three bow torpedoes from 1,000 yd (910 m) missed, but her second salvo of four stern torpedoes from 800 yd (730 m) was more successful. Three torpedoes hit Tama, breaking the ship in two, and sinking her within minutes, with all hands at 21°23′N 127°19′E.

Tama was removed from the navy list on 20 December 1944.
