= Organization of the Imperial Japanese Navy Alaskan Strike Group =

Organization of Japanese Alaskan Strike Group (Aleutians) provides an overview of the Japanese World War II strike group for the Aleutian Islands and its hierarchy, the only part of the United States invaded by Japan during the war.

== Japanese Navy units in the Alaskan Operation ==
=== Commander in Chief, Navy Alaskan Strike Group ===
- Boshirō Hosogaya:-Commander-in-Chief, Navy Alaskan Strike Group, Aleutian Campaign

=== 1st Support Group Commander ===
- Boshirō Hosogaya:-command Heavy Cruiser Nachi and two destroyers

=== 2nd Carrier Squad Commander ===
- Kakuji Kakuta:-Lead, Escort Carriers Ryūjō (37 aircraft) (among its fighter pilots aboard were Tadayoshi Koga), and Jun'yō (45 aircraft). Both Carriers were equipped with Mitsubishi A6M2 "Zero" fighters, Aichi D3A1 "Val" Dive-bombers and Nakajima B5N2 "Kate" Torpedo-bombers.

=== 3rd Cruiser Division (2° Section) ===
- Comprising the Cruisers Maya, Takao, and three destroyers

=== Navy Aleutian Occupation force ===
==== Attu Group Commander ====
- Sentarō Ōmori:-led Light Cruiser Abukuma, four destroyers, one minelayer, one transport (1,200 soldiers)

==== Kiska Group Commander ====
- Takeo Ono:-Guiding the light cruisers Kiso, Tama, one auxiliary cruiser (Asaka Maru), three destroyers, two minelayers, two transports (1,250 soldiers)

=== Navy Hidro Fighter unit in Aleutian Operation ===
- 5th Air Fleet:-equipped with Nakajima A6M2-N "Rufe" floatplane fighters, support operations from Kiska aquatic base, Aleutian islands.

== Japanese Army Units in the Alaskan Operation ==
=== North Seas Detachment Commanders ===
- Matsutoshi Hozumi:-He led one infantry battalion whose mission was to occupy the islands of Attu, Kiska, and Adak, in conjunction with naval units.
- Juichiro Mineki:-he replaced at Hozumi in command of unit and receiving command of a reinforced group, grown to three infantry battalions, under Commander-in-Chief of the Fifth Fleet.

=== Last Japanese Navy Infantry Commander in Alaskan Campaign ===
- Yasugo Yamazaki:-commander of last Japanese Navy infantry group in Attu Japanese held island
