= Battle of the Komandorski Islands =

1943 battle in the Pacific theatre of WWII

Coordinates: 53°5′55″N 168°12′46″E

- Part of World War II, Pacific War
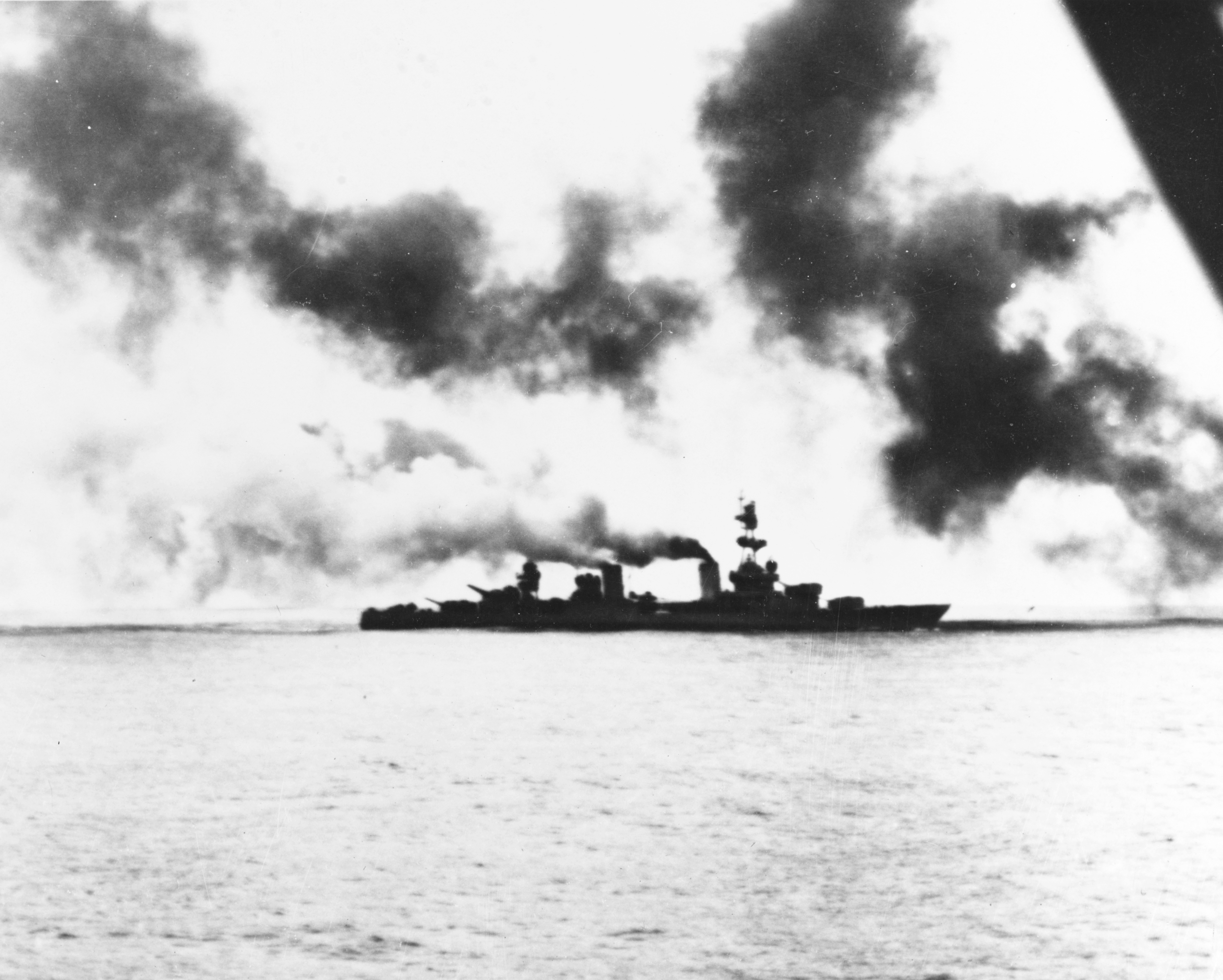
- The heavy cruiser Salt Lake City, damaged by Japanese cruiser gunfire, starts losing speed before going dead in the water during the battle under a smoke screen laid by accompanying destroyers.
Date	27 March 1943 (Note: The date is often given as 26 March because the U.S. ships used Honolulu time which refers to the other side of the International Date Line. However, the local date at Komandorski Islands was 27 March)
Location	off Komandorski Islands, Soviet Union
Result	American victory

Belligerents
United States	Japan

Commanders and leaders
(United States) Charles McMorris	(Empire of Japan) Boshirō Hosogaya

Strength
1 heavy cruiser 1 light cruiser 4 destroyers	2 heavy cruisers 2 light cruisers 4 destroyers

Casualties and losses
1 heavy cruiser severely damaged 2 destroyers slightly damaged 7 killed 20 wounded (Note: Morison, Aleutians, Gilberts and Marshalls, p. 33. Five were killed on Bailey and two on Salt Lake City, 7 hospital cases and 13 minor injuries, Coghlan was also hit once.)	1 heavy cruiser moderately damaged, 1 heavy cruiser slightly damaged, 14 killed, 26 wounded (Note: Morison, Aleutians, Gilberts and Marshalls, p. 33 and Hackett, CombinedFleet.com, . Thirteen were killed on Nachi and one on Maya.)

The Battle of the Komandorski Islands was a naval battle between American and Imperial Japanese forces which took place on 27 March 1943 in the North Pacific, south of the Soviet Komandorski Islands. The Japanese were escorting a three ship convoy, while the Americans were patrolling waters west of the Aleutian Islands. The battle was a daylight surface engagement in which air support played no role and in which the outnumbered American force escaped greater damage after the Japanese chose to withdraw.

== Background ==
In June 1942, Japanese forces landed in the western Aleutian Islands of Kiska and Attu, as a northern pincer of the main attack on Midway Island. After the stunning Japanese defeat at Midway, the Japanese held the islands as a defensive shield against any American attempt against the Kuriles. As the U.S. was preparing its assault on the Japanese strongholds, Japanese shipping between Japan and the islands was harassed by submarines and aircraft. The Japanese Imperial Navy countered this threat by sailing at night or taking advantage of stormy weather. Aware of Japanese tactics, Admiral Thomas C. Kinkaid deployed a surface force around Attu. On the night of 19/20 February 1943, the patrol force, consisting of the heavy cruiser Indianapolis and the destroyers Coghlan and Gillespie, shelled and sank the Japanese transport ship Akagane Maru (3100 GRT) west of Attu.

In a bid to defy the American blockade, Vice-Admiral Boshirō Hosogaya, in charge of the 5th Fleet and the northern theatre of operations, assembled a high-speed convoy with the two fast merchant ships Asaka Maru (7399 GRT) and Sakito Maru (7158 GRT) and a slower transport, the Sanko Maru (5491 GRT). The latter and her escort, the destroyer Usugumo, were to make a rendezvous with the main force south of the Komandorski Islands. The ships carried materiel essential to complete the building of an all-weather airstrip at Attu.

When Admiral Kinkaid became aware of Japanese plans to send a supply convoy to their forces on the Aleutian Islands of Alaska, U.S. Navy ships commanded by Rear Admiral Charles McMorris were sent to prevent this. The fleet consisted of the heavy cruiser Salt Lake City, the light cruiser Richmond and the destroyers Coghlan, Bailey, Dale and Monaghan.

American intelligence estimated that the Japanese escort consisted of one heavy cruiser, one light cruiser, and four destroyers. However, the Japanese 5th Fleet had been reinforced by two more cruisers, so that the Japanese escort force actually consisted of the heavy cruisers Nachi and Maya, the light cruisers Tama and Abukuma, and the destroyers Wakaba, Hatsushimo, Ikazuchi, and Inazuma. Vice Admiral Boshirō Hosogaya hoisted his flag on Nachi. Rear-Admiral McMorris didn't learn that he was facing a superior force until one hour after the first radar contact.

== Battle ==
On the early morning of 27 March 1943, the Japanese convoy was intercepted by the American picket line some 100 nautical miles south of the Komandorski islands and 180 nautical miles west of Attu, just to the west of the International Date Line. Despite lacking radar, the Japanese cruiser squadron spotted the American force half an hour earlier than the Americans spotted them, in part because the southern horizon was lightening earlier than the northern, and because the Japanese navy strictly selected lookouts of exceptional visual acuity. Because the battle was a chance encounter in a remote location on the open ocean, neither fleet had air or submarine assistance, so that it was one of the few engagements exclusively between surface ships in the Pacific Theater and one of the last pure gunnery duels between fleets of major surface combatants in naval history. At one point, McMorris sent a request for air support to the USAAF air base at Adak. However, the B-24 squadron sent to attack the Japanese force became lost in the fog and had to return home. A spotter aircraft from Nachi directed fire on the American force for the whole battle. While the Japanese side criticized the observers' inability to deal with smoke screens, the US reports say that the accurate way in which the enemy gunners shifted their fire led the Americans to believe that one of the Japanese cruisers had fire control radar.

Although the Japanese cruisers heavily outgunned the American force and inflicted more damage, the engagement was tactically inconclusive. The U.S. Navy warships escaped destruction after a Japanese misjudgment: with the Japanese fleet on the edge of victory, Admiral Hosogaya – not realizing the heavy damage his ships had inflicted and fearing American war planes would appear – chose to retreat, conceding a strategic victory to the US Navy. Indeed, the battle ended Japanese attempts to resupply the Aleutian garrisons by surface ship, leaving only submarines to conduct supply runs. The airstrip at Attu was never finished. Hosogaya was accordingly retired from active service after the battle and assigned to govern a group of South Pacific islands.

=== Timeline of the battle ===
This is a timeline of the action based on accounts by O'Hara and Millsap.

- 0600: The United States ships were formed in a scouting line at six-mile intervals zig-zagging at 15 knots on base course 020°.
- 0700: While the Japanese formation was turning 180° to a northern course, the destroyer Inazuma, still heading south, spotted unknown ships 27000 yards to port. A navigating officer on one of the transports visually observed the American force minutes later.
- 0715: As the day dawned, the ships were identified as American.
- 0730: Hosogaya ordered a turn to starboard, to the southeast, while the two fast transports were ordered to withdraw north-northwest, escorted by Inazuma.
- 0730: The lead ships Coghlan and Richmond made radar contact with the two trailing Japanese transports and a destroyer on course 080° at 13 kn (15 mph; 24 km/h).
- 0740: The Americans changed course to 080° and the rear ships increased speed to operate as a compact group. Five radar blips were counted.
- 0755: The Japanese turned northward to course 340° and the Americans came to course 000° to follow.
- 0811: The Americans visually identified the radar contacts as two transports, two light cruisers, and a destroyer.
- 0820: The Americans sighted the masts of four more Japanese ships on the horizon.
- 0835: The Americans identified the masts as two heavy cruisers and two destroyers and turned to course 240°.
- 0838: The Japanese transports swerved off to the northwest.
- 0839: The Americans increased speed to 25 kn (29 mph; 46 km/h).
- 0840: Nachi opened fire on Richmond at a range of 20,000 yd (18,000 m). The second and third salvos were straddles.
- 0840: Nachi launched her spotter aircraft to direct fire on the US force.
- 0841: Richmond opened fire on Nachi. The third salvo was a straddle.
- 0842: Salt Lake City opened fire on Nachi at a range of 21,000 yd (19,000 m). The second salvo was a straddle.

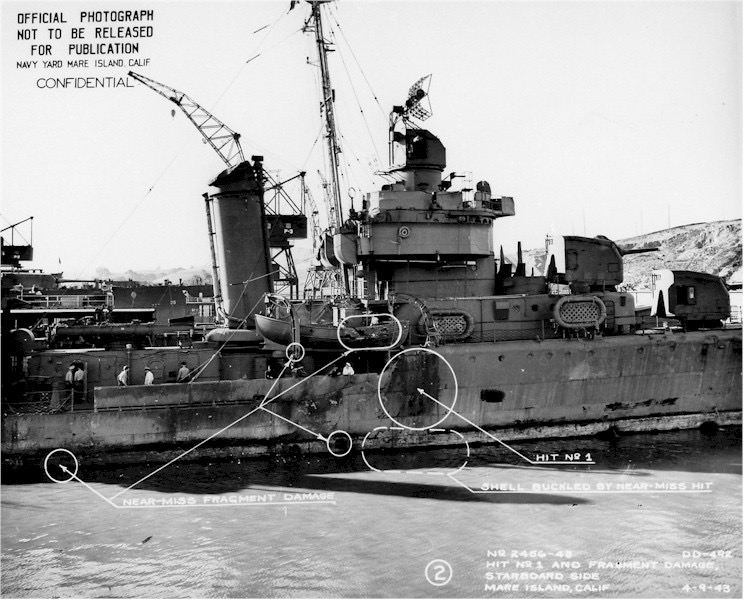
USS Bailey showing battle damage in the aftermath of the action

As the range closed, Bailey opened fire on Nachi at a range of 14,000 yd (13,000 m) and then switched to a light cruiser. Coghlan opened fire on Nachi at a range of 18,000 yd (16,000 m).

- 0845: Nachi launched eight torpedoes. All missed.
- 0850: One of Richmond′s 6 in (152 mm) shells hit the starboard side of Nachi′s signal bridge, killing 11 and wounding 21. Another shell hit Nachi′s mainmast and severed the flagship's radio communication.
- 0852: One of Richmond′s 6-inch shells hit Nachi′s torpedo compartment. Another hit Nachi′s control room, killing two and wounding five. Nachi dropped back after losing electrical power to ammunition hoists and gun mounts.
- 0903: Richmond ceased firing. Salt Lake City continued firing from stern turrets.
- 0910: Salt Lake City was hit by an 8 in (203 mm) projectile fired by Maya. Two men were killed, while the starboard observation plane caught fire and was jettisoned.
- 1010: Salt Lake City was hit by an 8-inch projectile fired by Maya.
- 1059: Salt Lake City was hit by an 8-inch projectile fired by Maya.
- 1103: Salt Lake City was hit by an 8-inch projectile fired by Maya. Salt Lake City transferred water to correct a list caused by flooding.
- 1152: Salt Lake City was hit by an 8-inch projectile fired by Maya.
- 1153: Salt water entered a fuel tank in use and extinguished Salt Lake City′s boiler fires.
- 1154: Salt Lake City slowed to a stop. Bailey, Coghlan and Monaghan approached the Japanese cruisers for a torpedo attack while Richmond and Dale made smoke to shield Salt Lake City.
- 1203: Salt Lake City restarted boilers and increased speed to 15 knots.
- 1213: Salt Lake City increased speed to 22 kn (25 mph; 41 km/h).
- 1225: Bailey launched five torpedoes at 9,500 yd (8,700 m). All missed. Bailey was hit twice by 8-inch shells and came to a stop with five dead. Coghlan was hit once.
- 1230: Japanese ships retired westward. Neither Coghlan nor Monaghan launched torpedoes.

Salt Lake City fired 806 armor-piercing projectiles and then 26 high-capacity (explosive) shells after the supply of armor-piercing ammunition was exhausted. Powder and shells were manhandled aft from the forward magazines to keep the aft guns firing. Salt Lake City′s rudder stops were carried away, limiting her to 10° course changes.

== Order of battle ==
=== United States Navy ===
Task Group 16.6 - RADM Charles McMorris, Commander, Task Group 16.6 (a subordinate Task Group of Task Force 16)

- 1 Pensacola-class heavy cruiser: Salt Lake City - CAPT Bertram J. Rodgers
- 1 Omaha-class light cruiser: Richmond - CAPT Theodore Waldschmidt (F)

Destroyer Squadron 14 - CAPT Ralph Riggs

- 4 destroyers
  - 2 Benson-class
    - Coghlan - CMDR Benjamin Tompkins
    - Bailey - LCDR John Atkeson (F)
  - 2 Farragut-class
    - Dale - CMDR Anthony Rorschach
    - Monaghan - LCDR Peter Horn

=== Imperial Japanese Navy ===
Northern Force - VADM Boshirō Hosogaya, Commander, Fifth Fleet (Northern Force) Cruiser Division One:

- 2 heavy cruisers
  - 1 Myoko-class: Nachi - CAPT Akira Sone (F)(Myoko class)
  - 1 Takao-class: Maya - CAPT Takeji Matsumoto
- 1 Kuma-class light cruiser: Tama - CAPT Zensuke Kanome

Destroyer Division 21: - CAPT Amano Shigetaka

- 2 Hatsuharu-class destroyers
  - Wakaba - LCDR Suetsugu Nobuyoshi (F)
  - Hatsushimo - LCDR Nittono Suzuo

D Convoy - RADM Tomoichi Mori, Commander, Destroyer Squadron One

- 1 Nagara-class light cruiser: Abukuma - CAPT Shiro Shibuya (F)

Destroyer Division Six: - CAPT Takahashi Kameshiro

- 2 Akatsuki-class destroyers
  - Ikazuchi - LCDR Maeda Saneho
  - Inazuma - LCDR Terauchi Masamichi
- Transport Asaka Maru - CAPT Sakuma Takeo
- Transport Sakito Maru

2nd Escort Force

- 1 Fubuki-class destroyer: Usugumo (not engaged in the battle) - LCDR Ikeda Shunsaku
- Transport Sanko Maru
