= Japanese cruiser Nachi =

Myōkō-class heavy cruiser

- Nachi departing Yokosuka, 18 November 1932

History

Empire of Japan
- Name: Nachi
- Namesake: Mount Nachi, Wakayama, Japan
- Ordered: 1923
- Builder: Kure Naval Arsenal
- Cost: 21.9 million yen
- Laid down: 26 November 1924
- Launched: 15 June 1927
- Commissioned: 28 November 1928
- Stricken: 20 January 1945
- Fate: Sunk by U.S. Navy aircraft in Manila Bay, 5 November 1944

General characteristics
- Class & type: Myōkō-class cruiser
- Displacement: 13,300 long tons (13,500 t)
- Length: 201.7 m (661 ft 9 in)
- Beam: 20.73 m (68 ft 0 in)
- Draft: 6.32 m (20 ft 9 in)
- Installed power: 130,000 shp (97,000 kW)
- Propulsion: 4 × geared steam turbines; 12 × boilers; 4 × shafts
- Speed: 36 kn (67 km/h; 41 mph)
- Range: 8,000 nmi (15,000 km; 9,200 mi) at 14 kn (26 km/h; 16 mph)
- Complement: 773
- Armament: 10 × 203 mm (8.0 in) guns (5x2); 6 × 120 mm (4.7 in) guns (to 1934) or 8 × 127 mm (5.0 in) guns (from 1935); 2 × 13.2 mm (0.52 in) machine guns; 12 × 610 mm (24 in) torpedo tubes
- Armor: Main belt: 100 mm (3.9 in); Main deck: 37 mm (1.5 in); Turrets: 25 mm (0.98 in); Barbettes: 75 mm (3.0 in)
- Aircraft carried: 2 × floatplanes

Service record
- Part of: (Empire of Japan) Imperial Japanese Navy
- Operations: Pacific War; Battle of the Java Sea (1942); Second Battle of the Java Sea (1942); Battle of the Komandorski Islands (1943); Battle of Surigao Strait (1944)

Nachi (那智) was the second vessel completed of the four-member Myōkō class of heavy cruisers of the Imperial Japanese Navy (IJN), which were active in World War II. The other ships of the class were Myōkō, Ashigara, and Haguro. She was named after a mountain in Wakayama Prefecture.

== Background ==
The Myōkō class was approved under the 1922–1929 Fleet Modernization Program as the first heavy cruisers to be built by Japan within the design constraints imposed by the Washington Naval Treaty, and was the first of the "10,000-ton" cruisers built by any nation. Naval architect Vice Admiral Yuzuru Hiraga was able to keep the design from becoming dangerously top-heavy in its early years by continually rejecting demands from the IJN general staff for additional equipment to the upper decks. During modifications and rebuildings in the 1930s, though, the final displacement rose to 15,933 tons, well over the treaty limits.

== Design ==
The Myōkō class displaced 13,500 t (13,300 long tons), with a hull design based on an enlarged version of the Aoba-class cruiser. Nachi was 203.8 metres (669 ft) long, with a beam of 19.5 metres (64 ft) and draft of 6.36 metres (20.9 ft), and was capable of 35.5 knots.

Propulsion was by 12 Kampon boilers driving four sets of single-impulse, geared turbine engines, with four shafts turning three-bladed propellers. The ship was armored with a 102 mm (4.0 in) side belt, and 35 mm (1.4 in) armored deck, but the bridge was not armored.

Nachi's main battery was ten 20 cm/50 3rd Year Type naval guns, the heaviest armament of any heavy cruiser in the world at the time, mounted in five twin turrets. Her secondary armament included eight 12.7 cm/40 Type 89 naval guns in four twin mounts on each side, and 12 Type 93 Long Lance torpedoes in four triple launchers positioned below the aircraft deck. Nachi was also equipped with an aircraft catapult and carried up to three floatplanes for scouting purposes.

Nachi was repeatedly modernized and upgraded throughout her career to counter the growing threat of air strikes. She eventually mounted 52 Type 96 25 mm AT/AA Gun guns and two Type 93 13 mm AA guns after her final upgrade.

Nachi was laid down at Kure Naval Arsenal on 26 November 1924, launched and named on 15 June 1927, and commissioned on 26 November 1928. Although commissioned on 26 November, the ship was far from completed. Due to a political decision, the partially completed cruiser was sent to Yokosuka for the coronation naval review for Emperor Hirohito on 4 December. Afterwards, she was returned to Kure for the remaining work to be accomplished, and was only ready for service in April 1929. Emperor Hirohito visited the completed vessel at Kobe for a cruise on the Inland Sea on 28–29 May as part of his tour of the Kansai region of Japan to encourage domestic industrial production.

== Operational history ==
=== Early service ===
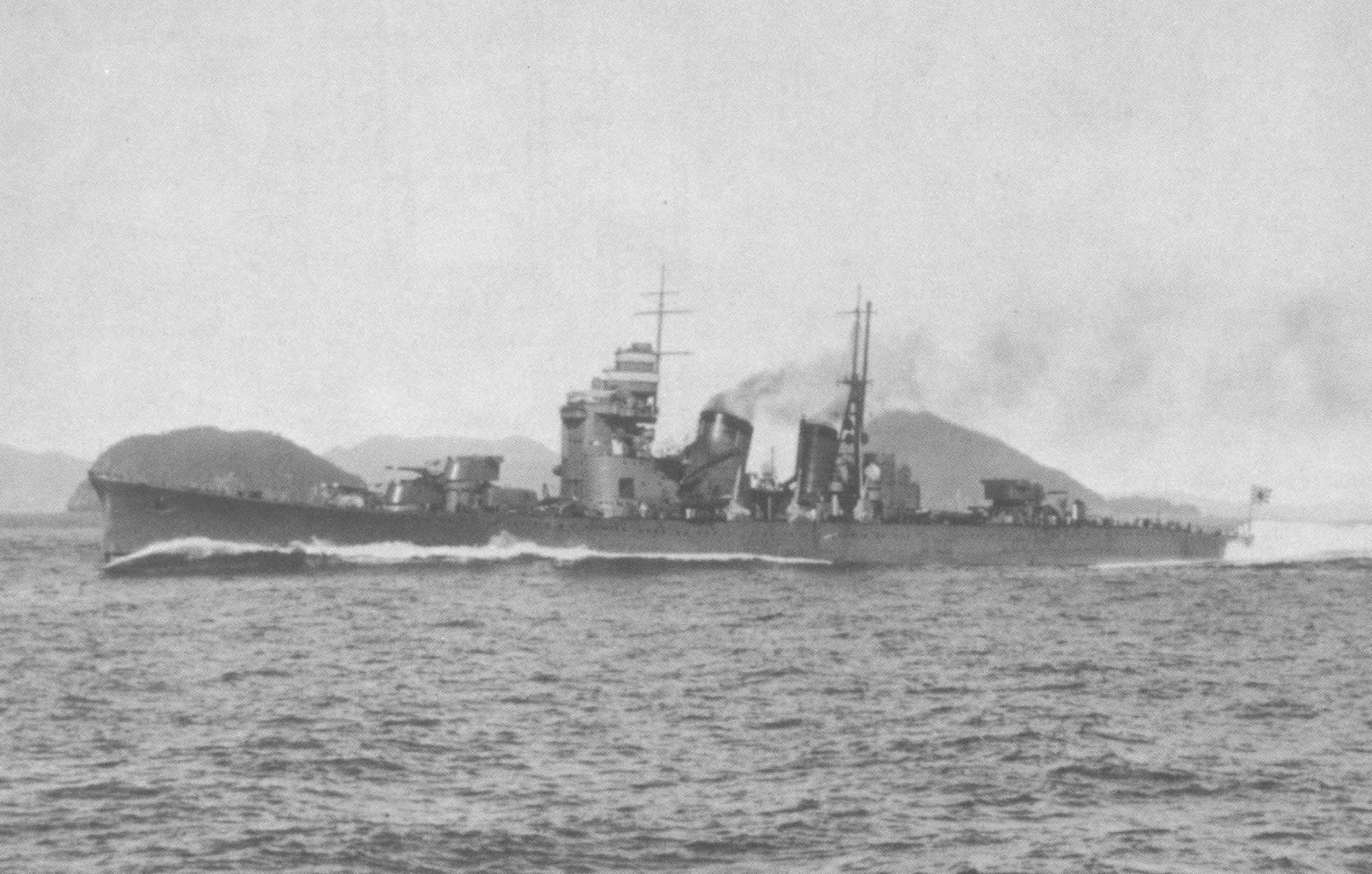
Nachi photographed soon after her full-power trials in November 1928

All of the Myōkō class were assigned to the Sasebo Naval District, forming Sentai-4 of the IJN 3rd Fleet, and trained as a unit during the 1930s. During a naval review off Kobe on 26 October 1930, stack gases caused problems on the bridge, resulting in a lengthening of the forward smokestack by 2.0 m. During the First Shanghai Incident of February 1932, the cruisers escorted the transports conveying elements of the Imperial Japanese Army (IJA) to the continent. In December 1932, the cruisers were placed in reserve as the new Takao class was commissioned, becoming the new Sentai-4, whereas the Myōkō class was shifted to Sentai-5. Between 1933 and 1935, all Myōkō-class cruisers were retrofitted with their fixed triple torpedo launchers replaced by two quadruple rotatable launchers, and their secondary guns upgraded from 12 cm/45 10th Year Type naval guns to 12.7 cm/40 Type 89 naval gun. Nachi was commanded by Captain Teruhisa Komatsu from November 1934 to December 1935, followed by Captain Michitaro Tozuka to November 1936.

In 1936, Nachi underwent her first modernization program at Sasebo Naval Arsenal. With the start of the Second Sino-Japanese War in 1937, Nachi transported the headquarters elements of the IJA's 3rd Division and 6th Infantry Regiment from Nagoya to China on 20 August, as part of a large combat force consisting of six cruisers and eight destroyers.

In December 1937, Nachi underwent her second modernization program at Sasebo Naval Arsenal, doubling the number of torpedoes to 16, adding another eight Type 96 25-mm antiaircraft guns and bulges to the hull to improve stability.

== Pacific War ==
=== Japanese invasions ===
In late 1941, Nachi was based at Mako Guard District in the Pescadores Islands, and at the time of the attack on Pearl Harbor, Myōkō and Nachi formed Sentai-5 of the IJN 3rd Fleet. Sentai-5 was commanded by Rear Admiral Takeo Takagi, and deployed from Palau to provide cover for the landings of Japanese forces under "Operation M" — the invasion of the southern Philippine Islands. After covering the landings of Japanese forces at Legaspi on 11 December 1941, Myōkō and Nachi returned to Palau, and were then reassigned to Rear Admiral Raizō Tanaka, whose attack force covered landings at Davao on 19 December and Jolo on 24 December.

On 4 January 1942 Nachi and the other vessels of Admiral Tanaka's invasion force were attacked by U.S. Army Air Force B-17 Flying Fortress bombers while at anchor at Davao. Myōkō was hit by one 500-pound (227 kg) bomb, causing only superficial damage, but Admiral Tanaka transferred his flag to Nachi, sending Myōkō back to Sasebo for repairs.

=== Battle of the Java Sea ===
In January 1942, Nachi and Haguro covered the landings of Japanese troops in the invasion of the Celebes in the Netherlands East Indies, followed by the invasion of Ambon. In the Battle of the Java Sea, Nachi, Haguro, and Jintsū participated in the destruction of the last remaining Allied fleet units in the Netherlands East Indies. On 27 February, the reconnaissance floatplanes from Nachi spotted the Allied fleet, enabling Haguro to sink the destroyer HNLMS Kortenaer with a torpedo and cripped the heavy cruiser HMS Exeter with gunfire, and for the destroyer Asagumo to sink the destroyer HMS Electra. For her part of the engagement, Nachi damaged the heavy cruiser USS Houston with a pair of 8-inch (203 mm) shell hits at distances beyond 22,000 yards, one passing through the bow, and the other punching through the aft section.

Later that same evening, Nachi and Haguro tracked down the allied force again and closed to 16,000 yards, firing their torpedo batteries. A torpedo from Nachi struck the Dutch light cruiser HNLMS Java, blowing up her 5.9-inch (15 cm) magazines, tearing the cruiser in two as it sank in two minutes. Several minutes later a torpedo from Haguro hit the light cruiser HNLMS De Ruyter, resulting in the cruiser sinking to progressive flooding over nearly three hours, and killing Admiral Karel Doorman.

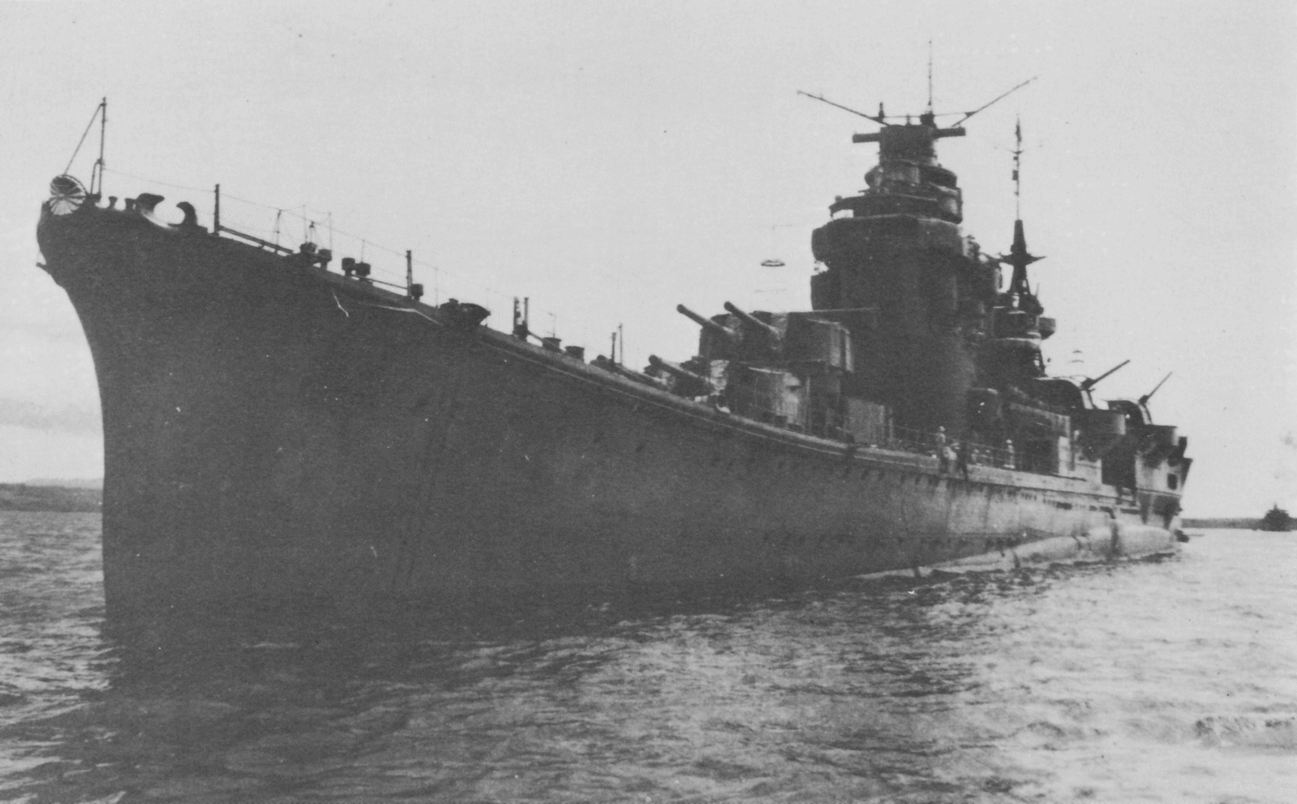
Nachi anchored off Kendari after the battle of the Java Sea, 6 March 1942

Two days later, on 1 March, Nachi and Haguro and their accompanying destroyers spotted the crippled Exeter as she attempted to escape the Java Sea, and joined forces with the cruisers Myōkō and Ashigara (and their accompanying destroyers). The four cruisers hit Exeter with shells that disabled her electrical power and guns, set her aflame, and destroyed her remaining boilers, leaving her dead in the water, leading to the allied cruiser's scuttling via her own crew. Nachi then retreated alongside Haguro, while Myōkō and Ashigara both engaged the destroyer HMS Encounter, which they overpowered and sank. The destroyer USS Pope, which was accompanying the two British ships, initially escaped the melee only to be caught and crippled about two hours later by planes from the Japanese light carrier Ryūjō, and finished off by Myōkō and Ashigara.

==== Operations in northern waters ====
Later in March, Nachi received a refit at Sasebo for operations in northern waters, and patrolled the Kurile Islands in April and May. On 26 May, Nachi departed from Ōminato Guard District as flagship of Vice Admiral Boshiro Hosogaya's force for the invasion of the Aleutian islands, and patrolled south of Attu, returning to Ōminato on 23 June. She departed Ōminato to escort another convoy to Kiska from 28 June, remaining in the Aleutian Islands until 7 July. After a refit at Yokosuka Naval Arsenal from 14–30 July, Nachi was reassigned to the IJN 5th Fleet with Kiso and Tama. She continued patrols of the Kurile Islands though March 1943, and was sent as an escort for a reinforcement convoy to Attu from 7–10 March.

While escorting another convoy towards Attu on 26 March, Nachi spotted an American force consisting of the cruisers USS Richmond and Salt Lake City and destroyers Bailey, Dale, Monaghan, and Coghlan. Vice Admiral Hosogaya had the cruisers Maya, Tama, and Abukuma, in addition to two destroyers. However, Maya was not carrying any aircraft, and Nachi had left one of her three planes behind for repairs. Hosogaya ordered Nachi's aircraft to launch, but before they did so, he also ordered that the cruiser's main battery open fire. The aircraft on the starboard catapult was damaged by the blast and had to be jettisoned. The remaining aircraft launched and provided reconnaissance during the subsequent Battle of the Komandorski Islands. Nachi launched her Type 93 "Long Lance" torpedoes at the American task force, but failed to hit. In a four-hour gun battle, the Japanese fleet damaged Salt Lake City and Bailey, but five shells hit Nachi, killing 14 crewmen, and Maya suffered damage to her number-one gun turret. Hosogaya abandoned the attempt to reinforce Attu, and was relieved of command in disgrace.

Nachi anchored in the Aleutians Islands, June 1943

Nachi was then repaired at Yokosuka, with eight Type 96 AA guns installed, returning to Paramushiro on 15 May, and then returning to Kiska from 10–15 July to evacuate the Japanese garrison. On 6 September, after departing Ōminato, Nachi was attacked by the submarine USS Halibut, which fired four torpedoes, two of which struck Nachi in her starboard side, but the torpedoes were duds and damage was minimal. Nachi remained based at Ōminato through July 1944.

==== Operations in the Philippines and sinking ====
Nachi was reassigned to Kure Naval District from 31 July 1944 and spent the month of August in training. Her antiaircraft defenses were updated with an additional two twin-mount and 20 single-mount Type 96 25-mm autocannon, bringing her final total to 48 barrels in September. In October 1944, she was sent to the Philippines as part of a cruiser force under the command of Vice Admiral Kiyohide Shima. During the Battle of Leyte Gulf from 24 October, Nachi and Ashigara were part of Vice Admiral Shoji Nishimura's force, which included the battleships Yamashiro, Fuso and the cruiser Mogami. On 25 October, after the Battle of Surigao Strait, Nachi and Mogami collided, resulting in severe damage to both vessels. Nachi was forced to retire to Manila to repair damage to her bow.

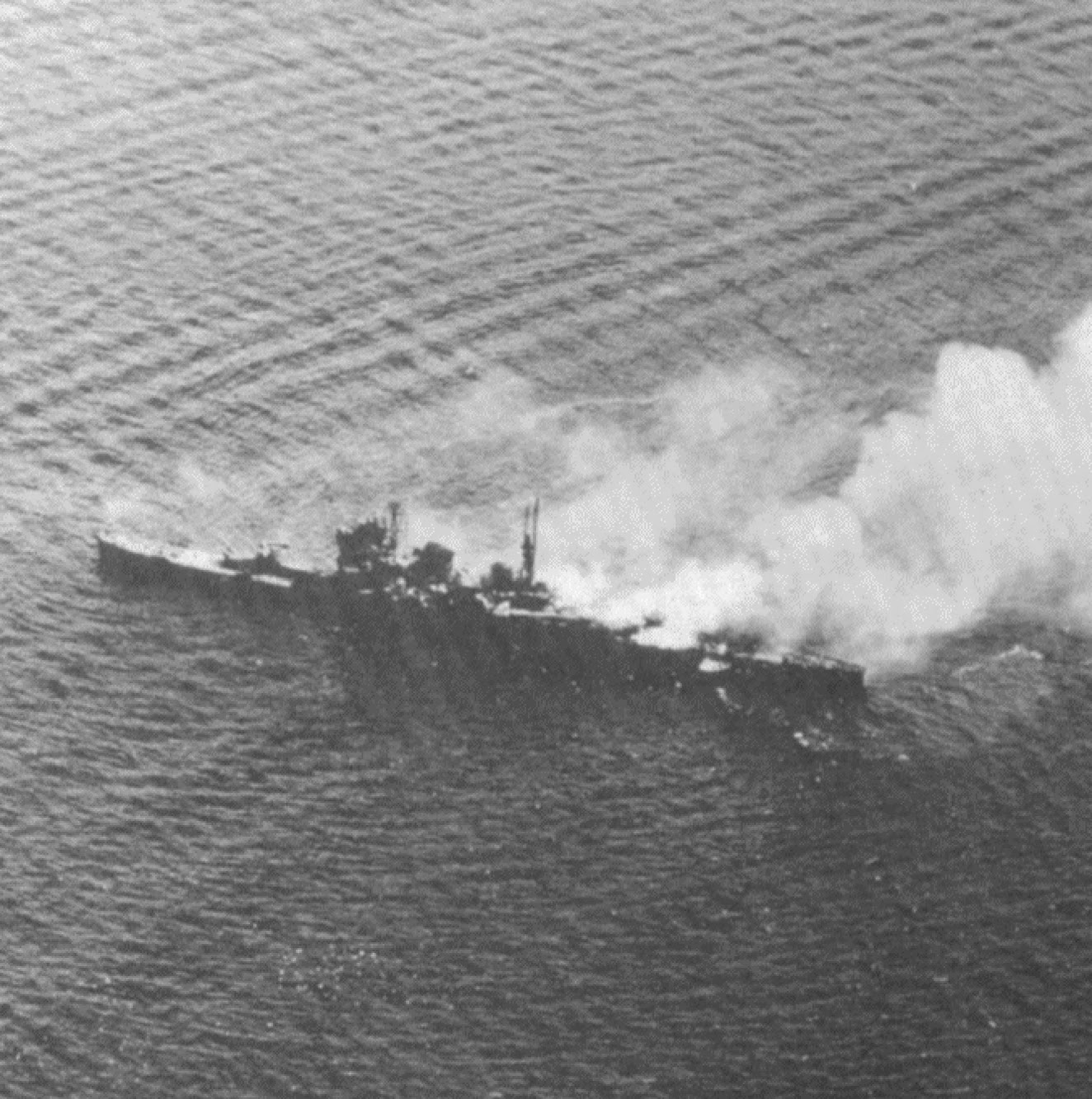
Nachi under attack by USN aircraft, 5 November 1944

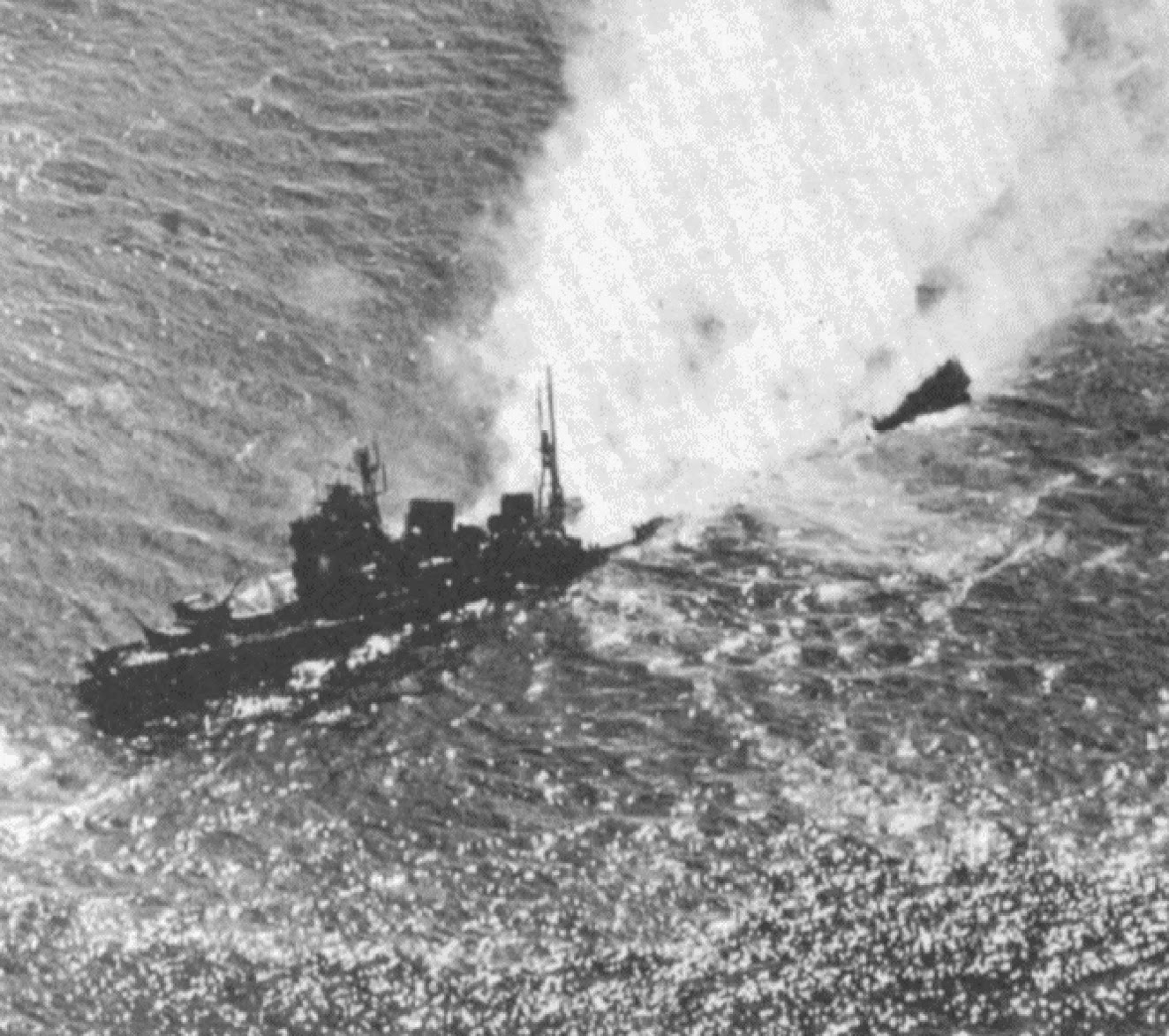
Nachi sinking with the bow and stern blown off, 5 November 1944

While under repair at Manila on 29 October, Nachi and Kumano were attacked by aircraft from USN Task Force 38. Nachi was hit by a single bomb to her aircraft deck, and this, as well as strafing attacks, killed 53 crewmen and further delayed repairs. On 5 November, again in Manila Bay, Nachi was attacked by three waves of U.S. planes from the aircraft carriers USS Lexington and Ticonderoga. She escaped the first wave undamaged, but was hit by five bombs and two or three torpedoes in the second wave while attempting to get underway. During the third wave, Nachi was hit by five torpedoes in her port side, which severed her bow and stern, and by an additional 20 bombs and 16 rockets. Nachi's flag commander, Vice Admiral Kiyohide Shima, was ashore for a conference at the time of the attack, but arrived at dockside in time to see his flagship blown apart. The central portion of the vessel sank in 102 feet (31 m) of water about 12 nautical miles (22 km) northeast of Corregidor (around 14°31′N 120°44′E).

The original wartime caption of a picture taken of the sinking Nachi by Lexington aircraft reads,

Note by target coordinator: We circled down to 20 feet to make sure there were absolutely no survivors. Fifteen or twenty oily figures were served with .50-caliber just to make sure.

Of the crew, 807 were lost, including the captain, while 220 survived and were rescued by the destroyers Kasumi and Akebono.

== Wreck ==
In April and May 1945, divers from USS Chanticleer made 296 dives on the wreck, salvaging radar equipment, code books, and maps of Japanese fortifications on Luzon and other documents. John Prados, in his book, Combined Fleet Decoded, writes that this was a major intelligence coup. This is also verified by U.S. Navy Master Diver Joseph S. Karneke, who served as the master diver aboard Chanticleer while diving on the wreck of Nachi, in his book, Navy Diver.

== Bibliography ==
- D'Albas, Andrieu (1965). Death of a Navy: Japanese Naval Action in World War II. Devin-Adair Pub. ISBN 0-8159-5302-X.
- Dull, Paul S. (1978). A Battle History of the Imperial Japanese Navy, 1941–1945. Naval Institute Press. ISBN 0-87021-097-1.
- Howarth, Stephen (1983). The Fighting Ships of the Rising Sun: The drama of the Imperial Japanese Navy, 1895–1945. Atheneum. ISBN 0-689-11402-8.
- Jentsura, Hansgeorg (1976). Warships of the Imperial Japanese Navy, 1869–1945. Naval Institute Press. ISBN 0-87021-893-X.
- Lorelli, John A. (1984). The Battle of the Komandorski Islands, March 1943. Naval Institute Press. ISBN 0-87021-093-9.
- Lacroix, Eric & Wells II, Linton (1997). Japanese Cruisers of the Pacific War. Annapolis, Maryland: Naval Institute Press. ISBN 0-87021-311-3.
- Patton, Wayne (2006). Japanese Heavy Cruisers in World War II. Squadron Signal Publications. ISBN 0-89747-498-8.
- Tamura, Toshio (2004). "Re: Japanese Cruiser Torpedoes". Warship International. XLI (4): 366–367. ISSN 0043-0374.
- Watts, Anthony J. (1966). Japanese Warships of World War II. London: Allan. OCLC 902270.
- Whitley, M.J. (1995). Cruisers of World War Two: An International Encyclopedia. Naval Institute Press. ISBN 1-55750-141-6.
