= USS Coghlan (DD-606) =

Benson-class destroyer

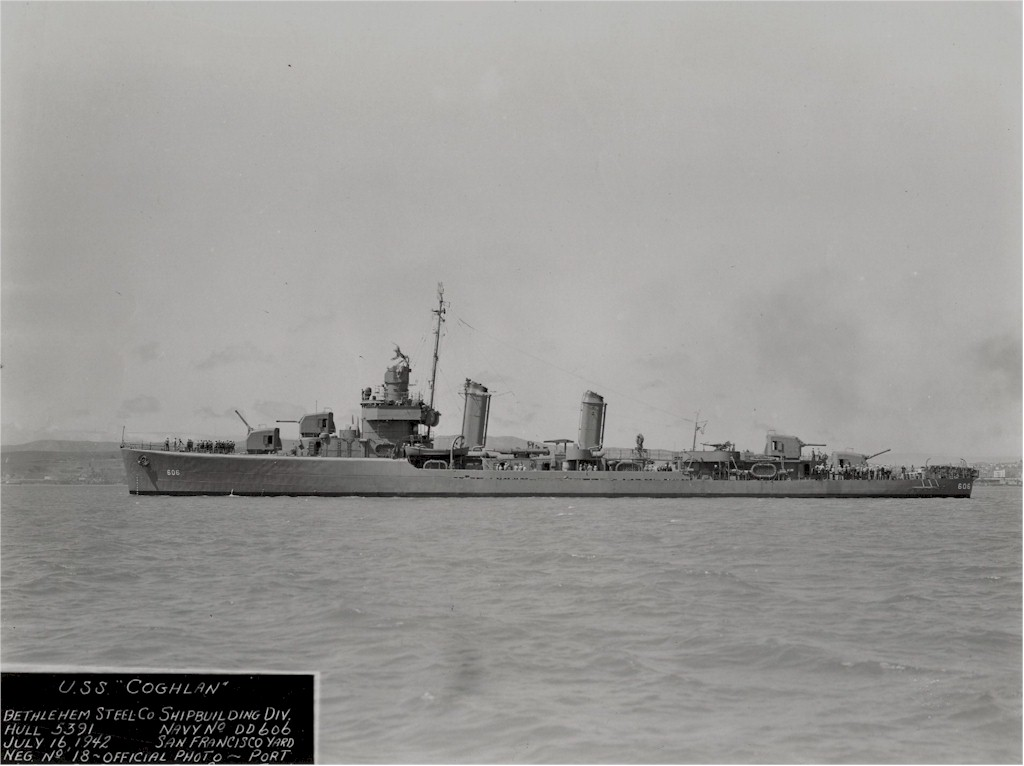
- Coghlan at Bethlehem Steel in San Francisco on 16 July 1942.

History

United States
- Name: USS Coghlan (DD-606)
- Namesake: Joseph Bulloch Coghlan
- Builder: Bethlehem Shipbuilding Corporation, San Francisco, California
- Launched: 12 February 1942
- Commissioned: 10 July 1942
- Decommissioned: 31 March 1947
- Stricken: 1 July 1971
- Fate: Sold for scrap, 1974

General characteristics
- Class & type: Benson-class destroyer
- Displacement: 1,620 tons
- Length: 347 ft 9 in (105.99 m)
- Beam: 361 ft (110 m)
- Draught: 17 ft 4 in (5.28 m)
- Speed: 38 kn (70 km/h)
- Complement: 262
- Armament: 4 x 5 in (130 mm)/38 guns, 5 x 21 inch (533 mm) tt.

USS Coghlan (DD-606) was a Benson-class destroyer in the United States Navy during World War II. She was the second ship named for Joseph Bulloch Coghlan.

Coghlan was launched on 12 February 1942 by Bethlehem Shipbuilding Corporation, San Francisco, California; sponsored by Mrs. G. Coghlan; commissioned on 10 July 1942, Lieutenant Commander B. F. Tompkins in command; and reported to the Pacific Fleet.

== Service history ==
Coghlan sailed from San Francisco on 22 September 1942 for Pearl Harbor and Kodiak, Alaska, arriving on 13 October for convoy and patrol duty. She supported Army landings on Amchitka on 12 January 1943, and participated in the bombardment of Gibson Island at the entrance of Chicago Harbor on 18 February. On 20 February, she aided in the sinking of a Japanese merchantman. On 15 March she cleared Dutch Harbor with a force to patrol against Japanese shipping south and west of Kiska to prevent reinforcement of Japanese-held Attu. On 26 March, her group turned a larger Japanese force back in the Battle of the Komandorski Islands. In this action, Coghlan screened Richmond, and laid smoke for Salt Lake City; she was hit once by a Japanese shell, but sustained no casualties. She bombarded Holtz and Chicago harbors on 26 April, and the southern support group covered the landings on Attu from 11 May to 2 June. Overhauled at San Francisco in July, Coghlan returned to Adak on 13 August for 2 final weeks on patrol in the Aleutian Islands.

Coghlan sailed on 25 August 1943 for Pearl Harbor, arriving on 1 September. After taking part in the raids on Baker and Tarawa Islands from 15 to 17 September and the attack on Wake Island on 5 October, Coghlan replenished at Pearl Harbor and sailed on 31 October for escort and screening duties in the assault on the Gilbert Islands. She returned to Pearl Harbor 11 December.

Coghlan sailed from Pearl Harbor 22 January 1944 to screen aircraft carriers giving air coverage to the landings in the Marshall Islands. She returned, screening transports, to Pearl Harbor 8 March for overhaul. On her next cruise, from 14 to 22 April, she escorted a carrier to sea on its way to Majuro, returning to Pearl Harbor 22 April. On 24 May, she sailed for Eniwetok, where she joined the screen of landing ships bound for the invasion of Saipan on 15 June. Coghlan gave fire support and patrolled off the island until 23 June. After replenishing at Eniwetok, the destroyer returned to Saipan 17 July to support the landings at Tinian 24 July. After offering fire support until the island was secured 1 August, Coghlan sailed for a brief overhaul at Pearl Harbor.

Coghlan arrived at Manus 8 October, and sailed for the operations in the Philippines 6 November. She conducted convoy escort duty from Humboldt Bay and Palau to Leyte, and supported the landings at Ormoc Bay on 7 and 8 December, firing in the heavy kamikaze attack on the first day. On 9 January 1945 she entered Lingayen Gulf for patrol and screening operations in support of the landings. She continued to operate in the Philippines until 8 April, when she cleared San Pedro Bay for a stateside overhaul. She returned to Pearl Harbor 22 July, and on 26 August arrived at Okinawa for occupation duty, carrying passengers, mail, and light freight between Okinawa and Japan. On 23 October she sailed for Pearl Harbor, San Diego, and Charleston, South Carolina, where she arrived on 2 December.

After overhaul and a year of inactivity, Coghlan was decommissioned and placed in reserve 31 March 1947. She was struck from the Naval Vessel Register on 1 July 1971 and sold for scrap in 1974.

== Awards ==
Coghlan received eight battle stars for World War II service.
