= Hisao Hayashi =

- 林 寿夫
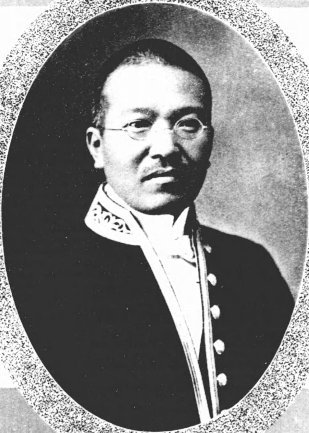
- Hayashi in 1934

Governor of the South Seas Mandate
- In office 4 August 1933 – 19 September 1936
- Monarch: Hirohito
- Preceded by: Masayuki Matsuda
- Succeeded by: Kenjiro Kitajima

Mayor of Kawagoe
- In office 13 October 1931 – 15 January 1932
- Preceded by: Kikurō Terao
- Succeeded by: Kinjūrō Hayakawa

Personal details
- Born: 2 May 1881 Okayama Prefecture, Japan
- Died: 21 December 1963 (aged 82)
- Education: Tokyo Imperial University

Hisao Hayashi (林 寿夫, Hayashi Hisao; 2 May 1881 – 21 December 1963) was a Japanese politician who was Governor of the South Seas Mandate from 1933 to 1936. He was mayor of Kawagoe, Saitama from 1931 to 1932. He was from Okayama Prefecture and a graduate of Tokyo Imperial University.

Preceded by Masayuki Matsuda	Governor of the South Seas Mandate; 1933–1936	Succeeded by Kenjiro Kitajima
