= Masayuki Matsuda =

Japanese politician

Baron Masayuki Matsuda
- 松田 正之
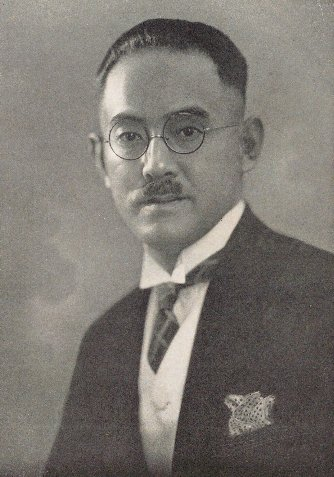

Governor of the South Seas Mandate
- In office 5 February 1932 – 4 August 1933
- Monarch: Hirohito
- Preceded by: Tahara Kazuo
- Succeeded by: Hisao Hayashi

Member of the House of Peers
- In office 8 December 1934 – 2 May 1947 Elected by the Barons

Personal details
- Born: 2 November 1892 Tokyo, Japan
- Died: 2 May 1976 (aged 83)
- Relatives: Yoriyasu Arima (brother)
- Education: Kyoto Imperial University

Baron Masayuki Matsuda (Japanese: 松田正之; 2 November 1892 – 2 May 1976) was a Japanese politician who was Governor of the South Seas Mandate from 1932 to 1933. He was a graduate of Kyoto Imperial University and a relative of politician Yoriyasu Arima.

Preceded by Kazuo Tawara	Governor of the South Seas Mandate; 1932–1933	Succeeded by Hisao Hayashi
