= Yoriyasu Arima =

Japanese politician

Count Yoriyasu Arima
- 有馬 頼寧
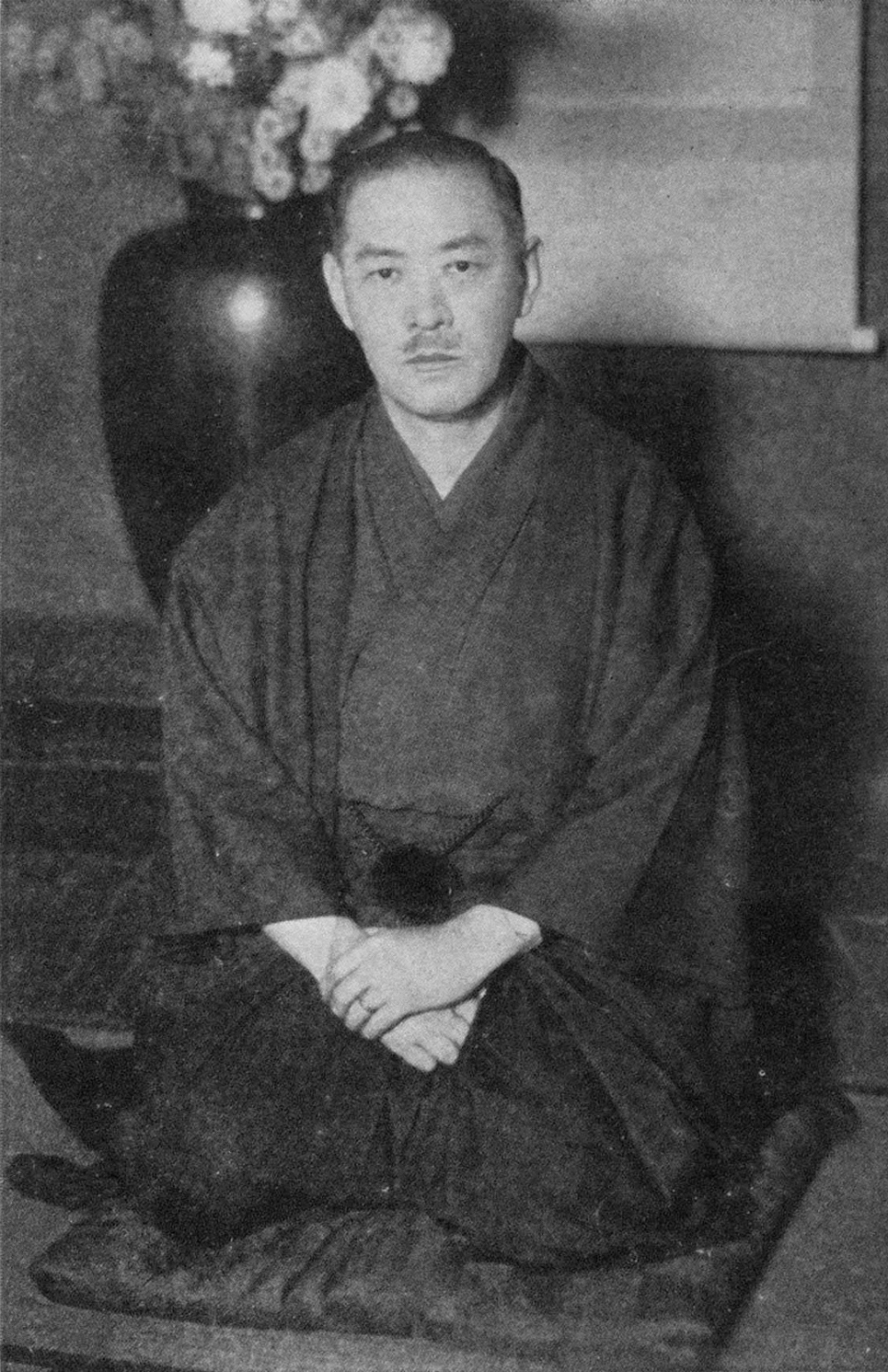
- Arima in 1940

Minister of Agriculture and Forestry
- In office 4 June 1937 – 5 January 1939
- Prime Minister: Fumimaro Konoe
- Preceded by: Tatsunosuke Yamazaki
- Succeeded by: Yukio Sakurauchi

Member of the House of Peers
- In office 3 August 1929 – 19 September 1940 Elected by the Counts

Member of the House of Representatives
- In office 11 May 1924 – 1 April 1927
- Preceded by: Noda Utarō
- Succeeded by: Arima Hideo
- Constituency: Fukuoka 12th

Personal details
- Born: 17 December 1884 Nihonbashi, Tokyo, Japan
- Died: 9 January 1957 (aged 72) Suginami, Tokyo, Japan
- Cause of death: Acute pneumonia
- Party: Rikken Seiyūkai
- Spouse: Princess Sadako Kitashirakawa
- Relatives: Masayuki Matsuda (brother); Iwakura Tomomi (grandfather); Teruhisa Komatsu (brother-in-law); Yoshinori Futara (brother-in-law)
- Education: Tokyo Imperial University

Yoriyasu Arima (有馬 頼寧, Arima Yoriyasu; 17 December 1884 – 9 January 1957) was a Japanese politician before and during World War II. His wife was the daughter of Prince Kitashirakawa Yoshihisa.

== Biography ==
Arima was born in Tokyo as a son of the former daimyō of Kurume Domain (now part of Fukuoka Prefecture). He studied agricultural science at the Tokyo Imperial University, and later became a professor there.

He read Karl Marx and Max Stirner, and other radical philosophers, and became attracted to the agrarian movement and radical political ideas. Arima founded the Nihon Nomin Kumiai (Japan Farmers' Union) together with Kagawa Toyohiko. He was active in various social programmes, including the establishment and support of night school, women's education, farmers' rights, and the rights of the burakumin, and was chairman of a cultural association aimed at improving education and cultural awareness in rural areas.

Arima was elected to the House of Representatives in the Diet of Japan in 1924 under the Rikken Seiyūkai party. In 1927, after he succeeded his father to the title of hakushaku (count) under the kazoku peerage system, he was nominated to the House of Peers.

Arima was a close personal friend of Fumimaro Konoe, and when Konoe became Prime Minister of Japan in 1937, Arima was requested to serve as his Minister of Agriculture. He also participated in Konoe's Showa Studies Society "Brain trust".

Arima became Secretary General of the Imperial Rule Assistance Association (IRAA) when it was founded in October 1940, but he resigned after five months due to opposition from conservative factions in the government. After the war, he was arrested by the General Headquarters to the Supreme Commander for the Allied Powers, for his role in the IRAA and as president of the Greater East Asia Development Society, but was later released in 1946 due to failure to indict.

=== Contribution to Japanese sports ===
In 1936, Arima helped organize the Tokyo Senators baseball team, and built a baseball stadium at the site where the present Korakuen Stadium in Tokyo is now located. Despite pressure from the Japanese military to ban the "western sport", Arima helped sustain the team up until dissolution in 1943, and professional baseball in Japan at large as an advisor to the league, during the war years.

In the post-war period, he was active in promoting horse racing. After becoming the second chairman of the Japan Racing Association (JRA), he lobbied for the a special provision law, known as the "Arima Special Provisions Law", which afforded the Nakayama Racecourse the reconstruction package it needed at the time. He died in 1957 of acute pneumonia. The Nakayama Grand Prix horserace, which he founded and modeled after the professional baseball All-Star games, was renamed the Arima Kinen in his honor.

He was inducted into the Japanese Baseball Hall of Fame in 1969.

== Books ==
- Bix, Herbert P. (2001). Hirohito and the Making of Modern Japan. Harper Perennial. ISBN 0-06-093130-2.
- Sims, Richard (2001). Japanese Political History Since the Meiji Renovation 1868–2000. Palgrave Macmillan. ISBN 0-312-23915-7.
