= Shunsuke Kondo =

- 近藤 駿介
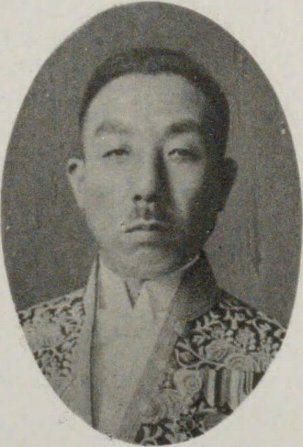

Governor of the South Seas Mandate
- In office 9 April 1940 – 5 November 1943
- Monarch: Hirohito
- Preceded by: Kenjiro Kitajima
- Succeeded by: Boshirō Hosogaya
Gubernatorial offices
Governor of Kumamoto Prefecture
In office 17 April 1939 – 9 April 1940
Monarch	Hirohito
Preceded by	Nagakazu Fujioka
Succeeded by	Chiyoji Yukisawa
Governor of Ishikawa Prefecture
In office 11 January 1938 – 17 April 1939
Monarch	Hirohito
Preceded by	Masasuke Kodama
Succeeded by	Ichirō Narita
Governor of Nagano Prefecture
In office 13 March 1936 – 11 January 1938
Monarch	Hirohito
Preceded by	Seiichi Ōmura
Succeeded by	Seiichi Ōmura
Governor of Fukui Prefecture
In office 6 April 1934 – 13 March 1936
Monarch	Hirohito
Preceded by	Shigeo Ōdachi
Succeeded by	Masanori Hanyu

Personal details
- Born: 17 December 1890 Nagasaki Prefecture, Japan
- Died: 30 April 1966 (aged 75)
- Education: Tokyo Imperial University

Shunsuke Kondo (近藤 駿介, Kondō Shunsuke; 17 December 1890 – 30 April 1966) was a Japanese government official who was the penultimate Governor of the South Seas Mandate from 1940 to 1943. He was governor of Fukui Prefecture (1934–1936), Nagano Prefecture (1936–1938), Ishikawa Prefecture (1938–1939) and Kumamoto Prefecture (1939–1940). He was from Nagasaki Prefecture and a graduate of Tokyo Imperial University.

Preceded by Seiichi Ōmura	Governor of Nagano Prefecture; 1936-1938	Succeeded by Seiichi Ōmura
Preceded by Masasuke Kodama	Governor of Ishikawa Prefecture; 1938–1939	Succeeded by Narita Ichiro
Preceded by Fujioka Nagakazu	Governor of Kumamoto Prefecture; 1939–1940	Succeeded by Yukizawa Chiyoji
Preceded by Kenjiro Kitajima	Governor of the South Seas Mandate; 1940–1943	Succeeded by Boshirō Hosogaya
