= Kenjiro Kitajima =

Japanese bureaucrat (1893–1957)

- 北島 謙次郎
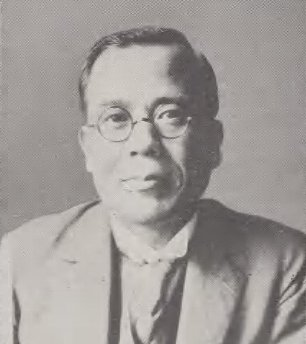

Governor of the South Seas Mandate
- In office 19 September 1936 – 9 April 1940
- Monarch: Hirohito
- Preceded by: Hisao Hayashi
- Succeeded by: Shunsuke Kondo

Personal details
- Born: 5 October 1893 Saga Prefecture, Japan
- Died: 24 November 1957 (aged 64)
- Education: Tokyo Imperial University

Kenjiro Kitajima (Japanese: 北島謙次郎; 5 October 1893 – 24 November 1957) was a Japanese government official who was Governor of the South Seas Mandate from 1936 to 1940. He was Deputy Minister of Colonial Affairs in 1940. He was from Saga Prefecture and graduated from Tokyo Imperial University.

Preceded by Hisao Hayashi	Governor of the South Seas Mandate; 1936–1940	Succeeded by Shunsuke Kondo
