= USS Bailey (DD-492) =

Benson-class destroyer

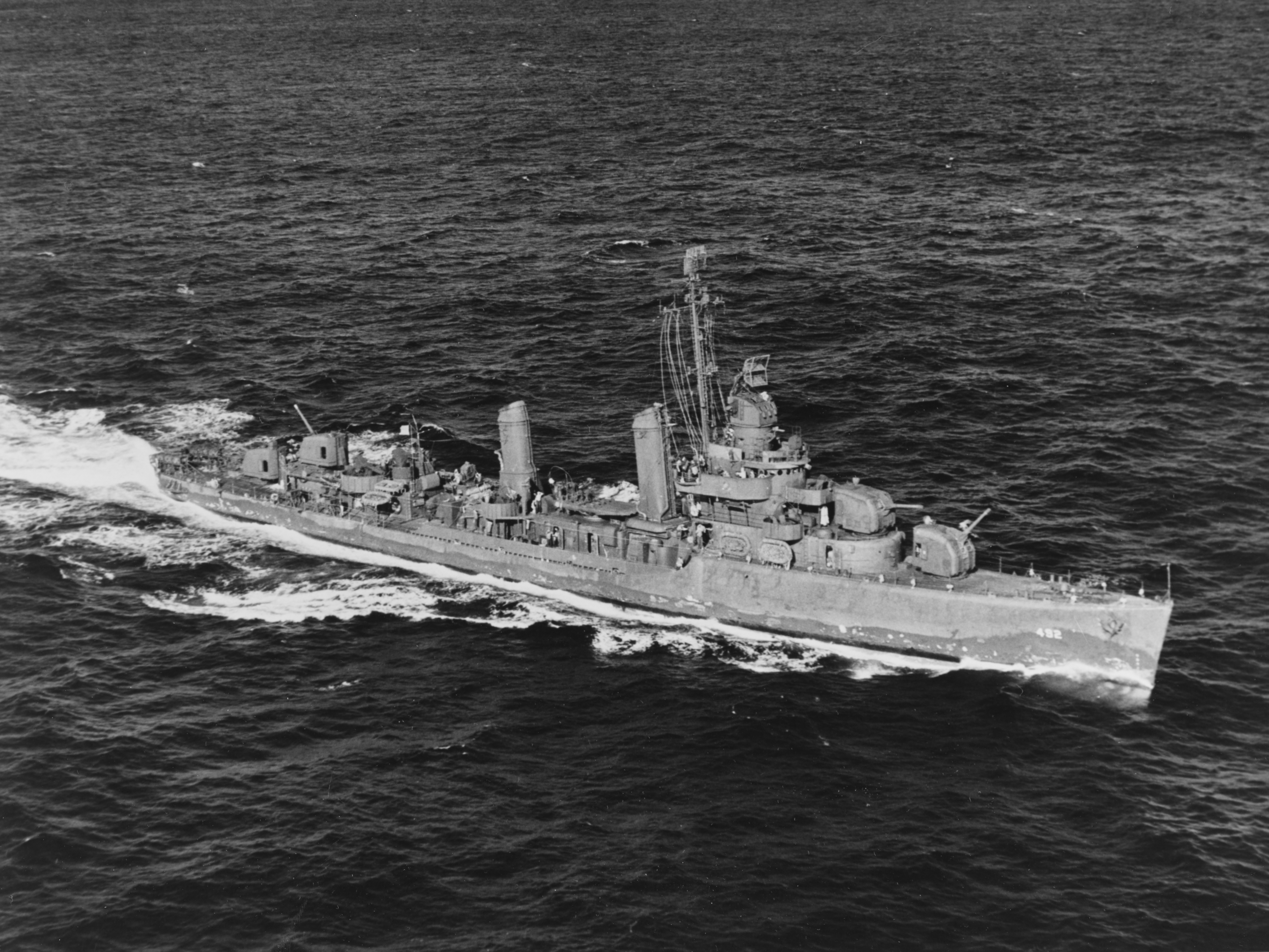
- USS Bailey (DD-492) underway on 12 December 1942

History

United States
- Name: USS Bailey (DD-492)
- Namesake: Theodorus Bailey
- Builder: Bethlehem Mariners Harbor, Staten Island, New York
- Laid down: 29 January 1941
- Launched: 19 December 1941
- Commissioned: 11 May 1942
- Decommissioned: 2 May 1946
- Stricken: 1 June 1968
- Fate: Sunk as target, 4 November 1969

General characteristics
- Class & type: Benson-class destroyer
- Displacement: 1,620 tons
- Length: 347 ft 10 in (106 m)
- Beam: 36 ft 1 in (11 m)
- Draught: 17 ft 4 in (5.3 m)
- Propulsion: 2x Westinghouse Geared Turbines; 50,000 shp (37,300 kW)
- Speed: 37 knots (69 km/h)
- Endurance: 5,000 nautical miles (9,000 km) at 15 knots (28 km/h)
- Complement: 276
- Armament: 4 x 5 in (127 mm)/38 guns, 1 x 21 inch (533 mm) quin TT

USS Bailey (DD-492) was a Benson-class destroyer in service with the United States Navy from 1942 to 1946. She was sunk as a target in 1969.

== History ==
She was the third ship named for Admiral Theodorus Bailey. Bailey was launched on 19 December 1941 by Bethlehem Steel Company, Staten Island, New York; sponsored by Mrs. Mary de Peyster Charles, granddaughter of Admiral Bailey, commissioned 11 May 1942 and reported to the Pacific Fleet.

=== Service history ===
In the Pacific, Bailey joined TF 8 on patrol in the Aleutian Islands. On 12 January 1943, she supported the unopposed invasion of Amchitka Island and on 26 March took part in the Battle of the Komandorski Islands during which time her captain was LCDR John Atkeson. During a torpedo attack, in which she scored several gunfire hits on Nachi, Bailey received three direct hits from 8-inch shells which killed five and wounded six men, and caused major damage to the ship. For this action, she was awarded the Navy Unit Commendation. After undergoing temporary repairs at Dutch Harbor, Alaska, Bailey arrived at Mare Island Navy Yard 8 April 1943 for permanent repairs.

Repairs completed, she arrived at Pearl Harbor 16 October 1943. Between November 1943 and October 1944, Bailey acted as a fire-support, picket, and patrol ship in the invasions of Tarawa (20 November – 7 December 1943); Maloelap and Kwajalein, Marshall Islands (30 January – 29 February 1944); Saipan and Tinian, Marianas Islands (15 June – 28 July); and Peleliu and Angaur, Palau Islands (15 September – 2 October).

On the night of 1 October 1944, she underwent two severe strafing attacks while on picket duty off the Palaus. Damage was extensive, 9 men were killed and 16 wounded. Following emergency repairs Bailey proceeded to Mare Island for permanent repairs, arriving 25 October.

Returning to Pearl Harbor on 24 December 1944, she supported the landings on Mindanao (10 March – 10 April 1945) and on Borneo (27 April – 22 July). Between August and November 1945, she was engaged in training in Far Eastern waters.

On 11 December 1945, she arrived at Boston, Massachusetts for inactivation and went out of commission in reserve at Charleston, South Carolina, 2 May 1946. She was stricken for the Naval Vessel Register on 1 June 1968. She was sunk as a target off Florida on 4 November 1969.

== Awards ==
Bailey received nine battle stars and the Navy Unit Commendation for her service in the Pacific.
