= Japanese destroyer Usugumo (1927) =

Fubuki-class destroyer

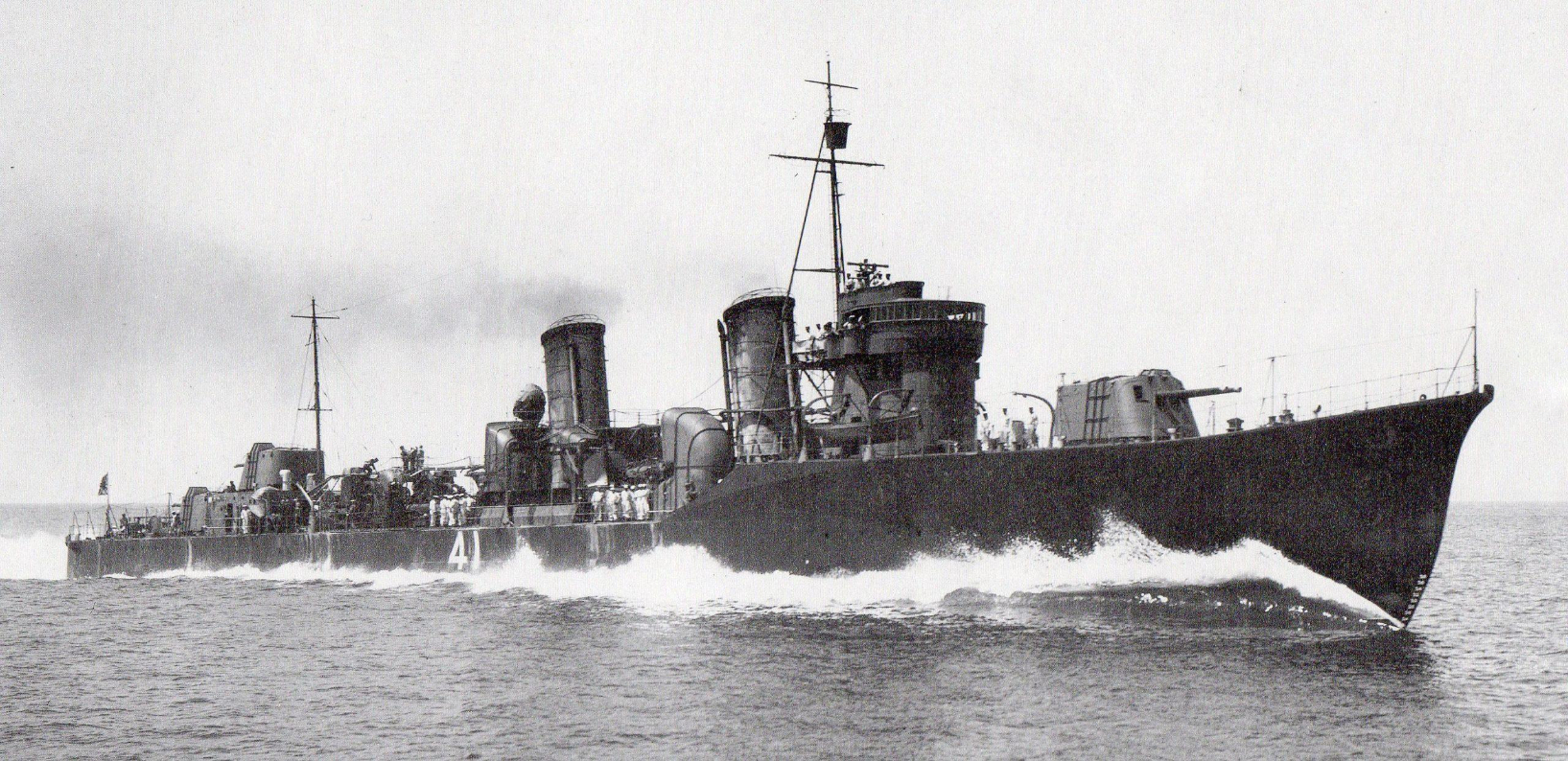
- Usugumo at full speed during sea trials, 1927–1928

History

Empire of Japan
- Name: Usugumo
- Ordered: 1923 Fiscal Year
- Builder: Ishikawajima Shipyards
- Yard number: Destroyer No.41
- Laid down: 21 October 1926
- Launched: 26 December 1927
- Commissioned: 26 July 1928
- Stricken: 10 September 1944
- Fate: Torpedoed and sunk, 5 July 1944

General characteristics
- Class & type: Fubuki-class destroyer
- Displacement: 1,750 long tons (1,780 t) standard; 2,050 long tons (2,080 t) re-built
- Length: 111.96 m (367.3 ft) pp; 115.3 m (378 ft) waterline; 118.41 m (388.5 ft) overall
- Beam: 10.4 m (34 ft 1 in)
- Draft: 3.2 m (10 ft 6 in)
- Propulsion: 4 × Kampon type boilers; 2 × Kampon Type Ro geared turbines; 2 × shafts at 50,000 ihp (37,000 kW)
- Speed: 38 knots (44 mph; 70 km/h)
- Range: 5,000 nmi (9,300 km) at 14 knots (26 km/h)
- Complement: 219
- Armament: 6 × Type 3 127 mm 50 caliber naval guns (3×2); up to 22 × Type 96 25 mm AT/AA guns; up to 10 × 13 mm AA guns; 9 × 610 mm (24 in) torpedo tubes; 36 × depth charges

Service record
- Operations: Second Sino-Japanese War; Aleutians campaign

Usugumo (薄雲, ”Thin Clouds”) was the seventh of twenty-four Fubuki-class destroyer, built for the Imperial Japanese Navy following World War I.

== History ==
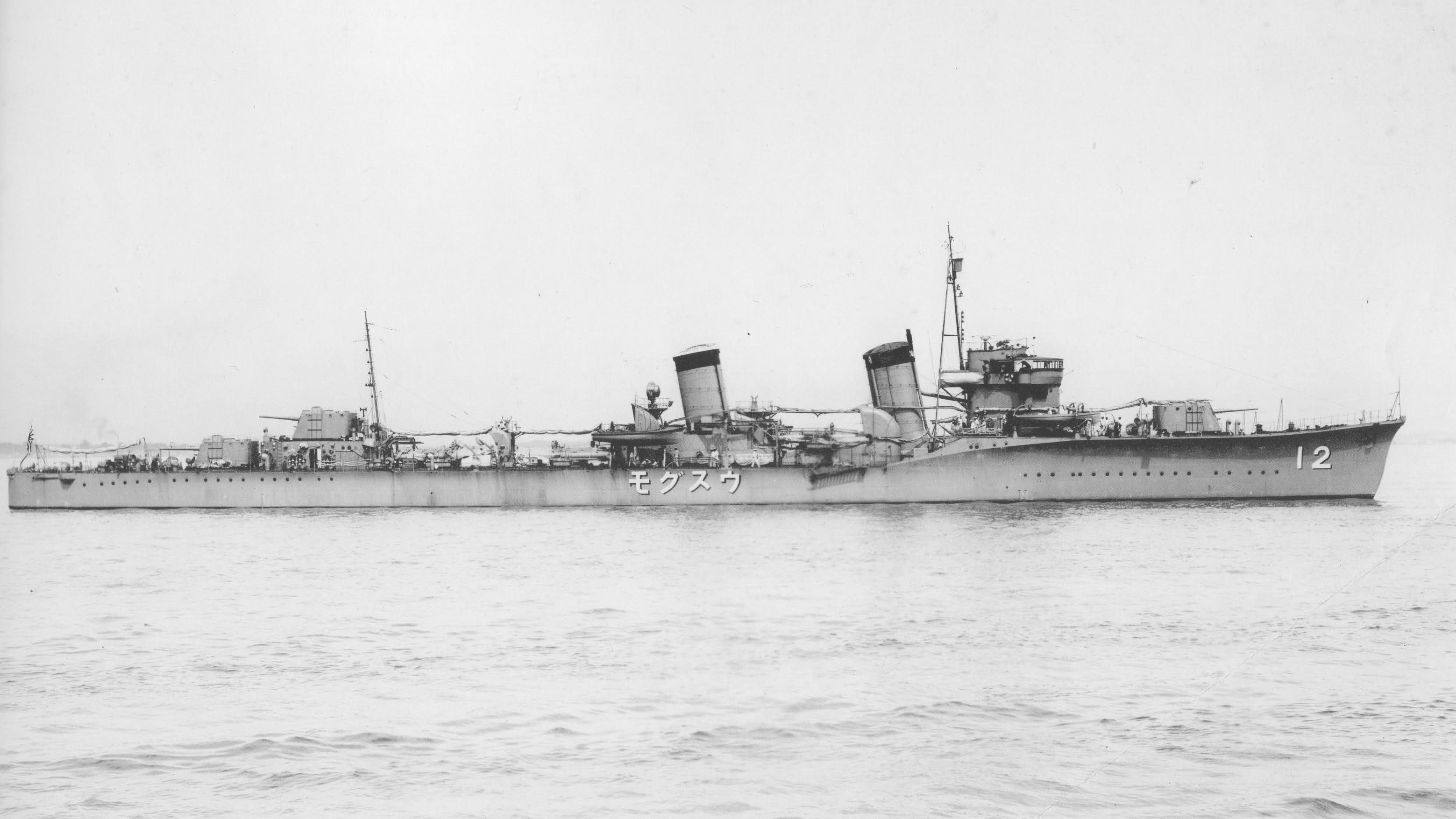
Usugumo in August 1928

Construction of the advanced Fubuki-class destroyers was authorized as part of the Imperial Japanese Navy's expansion program from fiscal 1923, intended to give Japan a qualitative edge with the world's most modern ships. The Fubuki class had performance that was far advanced over previous destroyer designs, so much so that they were designated Special Type destroyers (特型, Tokugata). The large size, powerful engines, high speed, large radius of action and unprecedented armament gave these destroyers the firepower similar to many light cruisers in other navies. Usugumo, built at the Ishikawajima Shipyards in Tokyo was laid down on 21 October 1926, launched on 26 December 1927 and commissioned on 26 July 1928. Originally assigned hull designation “Destroyer No. 41”, she was completed as Usugumo.

== Operational history ==
On completion, Usugumo was assigned to Destroyer Division 12 under the IJN 2nd Fleet. During the Second Sino-Japanese War, Usugumo was assigned to cover landings of Japanese forces in southern China. On 15 August 1940, she was severely damaged by a naval mine, and was taken back to Maizuru Naval Arsenal.

=== World War II history ===
At the time of the attack on Pearl Harbor, Usugumo was still under repairs, and was not available for combat duty until the end of July 1942, when she was assigned to the IJN 5th Fleet, and sent to the Ōminato Guard District. From August to the middle of October, Usugumo was assigned to patrols off the coast of Hokkaidō and the Chishima islands and to escort duty between Paramushiro and Attu and Kiska in the Aleutian Islands to the end of January 1943. In February 1943, she returned to Kure Naval Arsenal for repairs.

During the Battle of the Komandorski Islands on 26 March 1943, Usugumo was escorting the transport Sanko Maru, and thus did not see any combat during that engagement. Usugumo resumed transport runs between Paramushiro and Attu in April, and in July and August assisted in the evacuation of surviving Japanese forces from Kiska. At the end of November, Usugumo returned to Kure for refit.

After spending January 1944 in training in the Inland Sea, Usugumo returned to Ōminato at the start of February to resume northern patrols and escort duty. At the end of March, she escorted a troopship convoy to Uruppu Island

On 5 July 1944, after departing Otaru, Hokkaidō with another convoy for Uruppu, Usugumo was torpedoed by the submarine USS Skate in the Sea of Okhotsk, 330 nautical miles (610 km) west-southwest of Paramushiro at position 47°43′N 147°55′E. Two torpedoes broke her back; she sank in six minutes, leaving 49 survivors from a crew of 316.

On 10 September 1944, Usugumo was struck from the navy list.
