= Boshirō Hosogaya =

Japanese admiral (1888–1964)

- 細萱 戊子郎
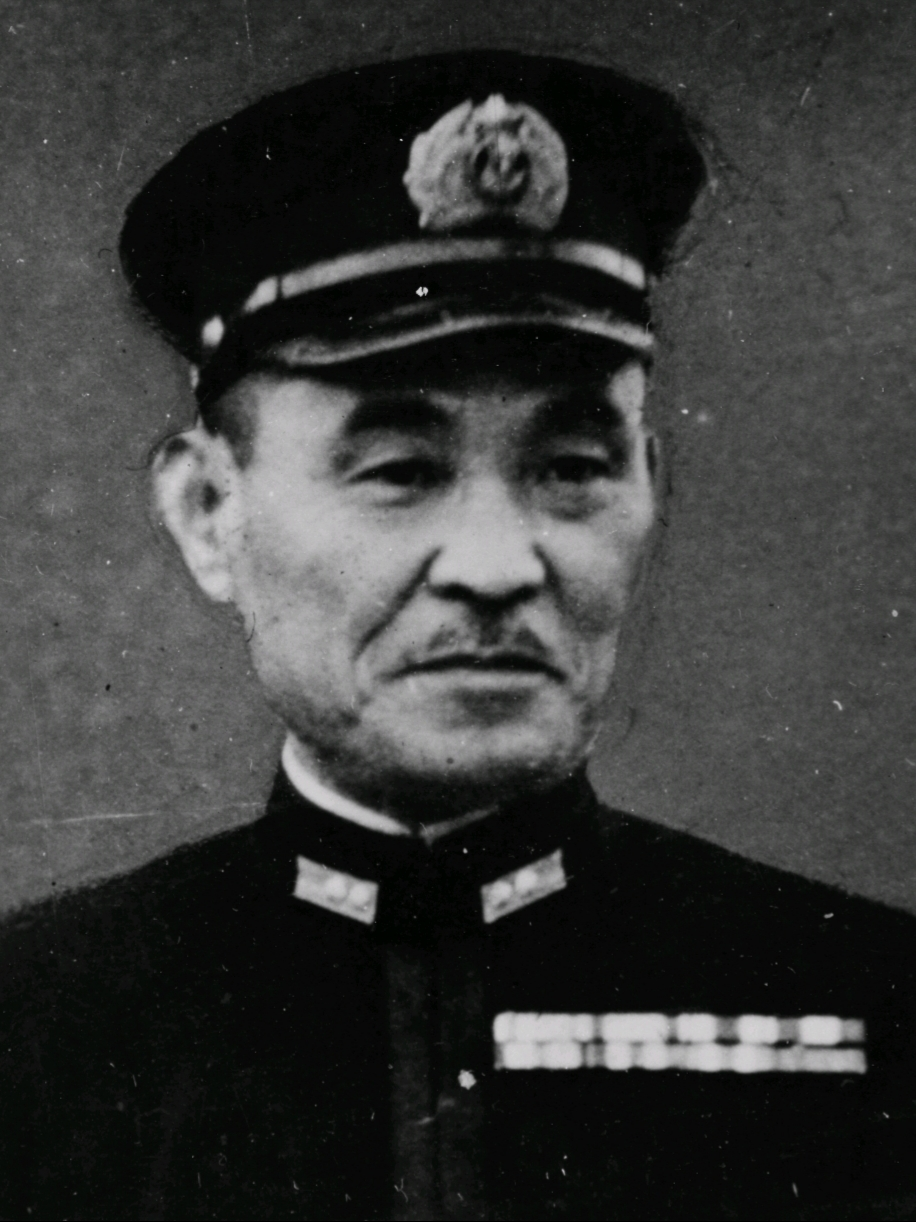

Governor of the South Seas Mandate
- In office 5 November 1943 – 2 September 1945
- Monarch: Hirohito
- Preceded by: Shunsuke Kondo
- Succeeded by: Office abolished

Personal details
- Born: 24 June 1888 Nozawa, Nagano, Japan
- Died: 8 February 1964 (aged 75) Japan
- Education: Imperial Japanese Naval Academy; Torpedo School; Naval Artillery School; Naval War College

Military service
- Allegiance: Empire of Japan
- Branch/service: Imperial Japanese Navy
- Years of service: 1908–1943
- Rank: Vice admiral
- Unit: Soya, Kashima, Asagiri, Suwo, Kaba, Imperial Japanese Navy General Staff, Yubari, Hyūga
- Commands: Chōkai, Mutsu, 5th Destroyer Squadron, Naval Communication School, Torpedo School, 4th Destroyer Squadron, 1st Air Flotilla, Ryojun Guard District, 1st China Expeditionary Fleet, 5th Fleet
- Battles/wars: World War II; Pacific War; Aleutians campaign; Battle of Attu; Occupation of Kiska; Battle of Dutch Harbor; Battle of the Komandorski Islands

Boshirō Hosogaya (細萱 戊子郎, Hosogaya Boshirō; 24 June 1888 – 8 February 1964) was a vice admiral in the Imperial Japanese Navy during World War II and the last Governor of the South Seas Mandate from 1943 to 1945.

== Biography ==
Hosogaya was born to a farming family in Nozawa, Nagano Prefecture in 1888. He graduated from the 36th class of the Imperial Japanese Naval Academy in 1908, ranking 16th in a class of 191 cadets. As a midshipman, he was assigned to the cruiser Soya and the battleship Kashima. On receiving his commission as ensign, he attended Torpedo School and Naval Artillery School, and as a sub-lieutenant served on the destroyer Asagiri and battleship Suwo.

He was promoted to lieutenant in 1919, and served on the destroyer Kaba, and various staff positions. After graduating from the 18th class of Naval War College in 1918 and his promotion to lieutenant commander in 1920, he served as a staff officer on the Imperial Japanese Navy General Staff, and also on the martial law headquarters for the Kantō region after the 1923 Great Kantō earthquake. In 1924, Hosogaya was promoted to commander and became executive officer on the cruiser Yubari. In 1927–1928, he visited the United States and Europe, and in 1928 became executive officer on the battleship Hyūga.

After his promotion to captain in 1929, he served as executive officer, and then as captain of the heavy cruiser Chōkai. In 1934, he assumed command of the battleship Mutsu. He was promoted to rear admiral on 15 November 1935. He was Commandant of both the Communications and Torpedo Schools during 1935–1936. After his promotion to vice admiral on 15 November 1939, he was assigned as Commander in Chief of the Ryojun Guard District. On 15 November 1940, Hosogaya was given command of the 1st China Expeditionary Fleet and on 25 July 1941, he became CINC of the 5th Fleet, a largely administrative command based at Ōminato in command of the North Pacific forces, covering the Hokkaidō-Karafuto-Kurile Islands defense area. The fleet had only light naval forces attached to it, including a couple of light cruisers and a seaplane tender.

As part of the Battle of Midway, Hosogaya directed the Aleutian Islands campaign as well as the invasion of Attu and Kiska and the bombardment of Dutch Harbor.

On 26 March 1943, escorting two transports to reinforce Japanese-occupied Kiska in the Aleutian Islands, Hosogaya's force, consisting of two heavy cruisers, two light cruisers, and four destroyers, was intercepted near the Komandorski Islands by a U.S. Navy force, led by rear admiral Charles McMorris, comprising one heavy cruiser, one light cruiser and four destroyers. In the ensuing Battle of the Komandorski Islands, Hosogaya mistook shell splashes from colored dye shells for bomb splashes, and wrongly concluded he was under aerial attack. Seeking to protect his ships, he abruptly broke off the action and retreated from battle even though he had severely damaged McMorris's flagship, the heavy cruiser USS Salt Lake City.

Hosogaya's retreat from an inferior American force was viewed as evidence of cowardice and cost him his command; he was relieved by Shiro Kawase. Later in 1943, he was assigned to the reserves. For the rest of the war, Hosogaya was based in Truk, serving as the Governor of the South Seas Mandate.

Hosogaya resigned on 12 March 1946 and died on 8 February 1964, aged 75.

== See also ==
- Organization of the Imperial Japanese Navy Alaskan Strike Group
