= Governor of the South Seas Mandate =

Japanese administrative office (1922–1944)

- 南洋諸島知事; Nan'yō shotō chiji
- Flag of the governor of the South Seas Mandate

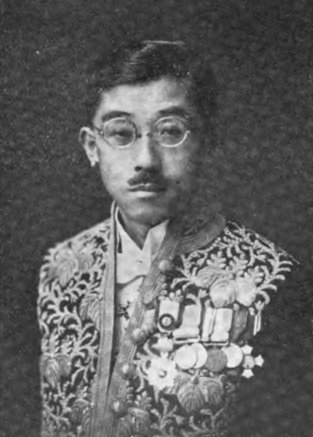
- Longest serving Gosuke Yokota; 4 April 1923–11 October 1931
- Reports to: Prime Minister of Japan (until 1929); Minister of Colonial Affairs (from 1929)
- Seat: Koror City
- Formation: 28 December 1914
- First holder: Matsumura Tatsuo
- Final holder: Boshirō Hosogaya
- Abolished: 2 September 1945
- Succession: High Commissioner of the Trust Territory of the Pacific Islands

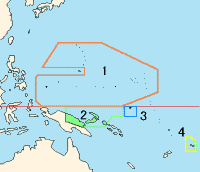
League of Nations mandates in the Pacific Ocean. The South Seas Mandate (bordered in orange) is number 1.

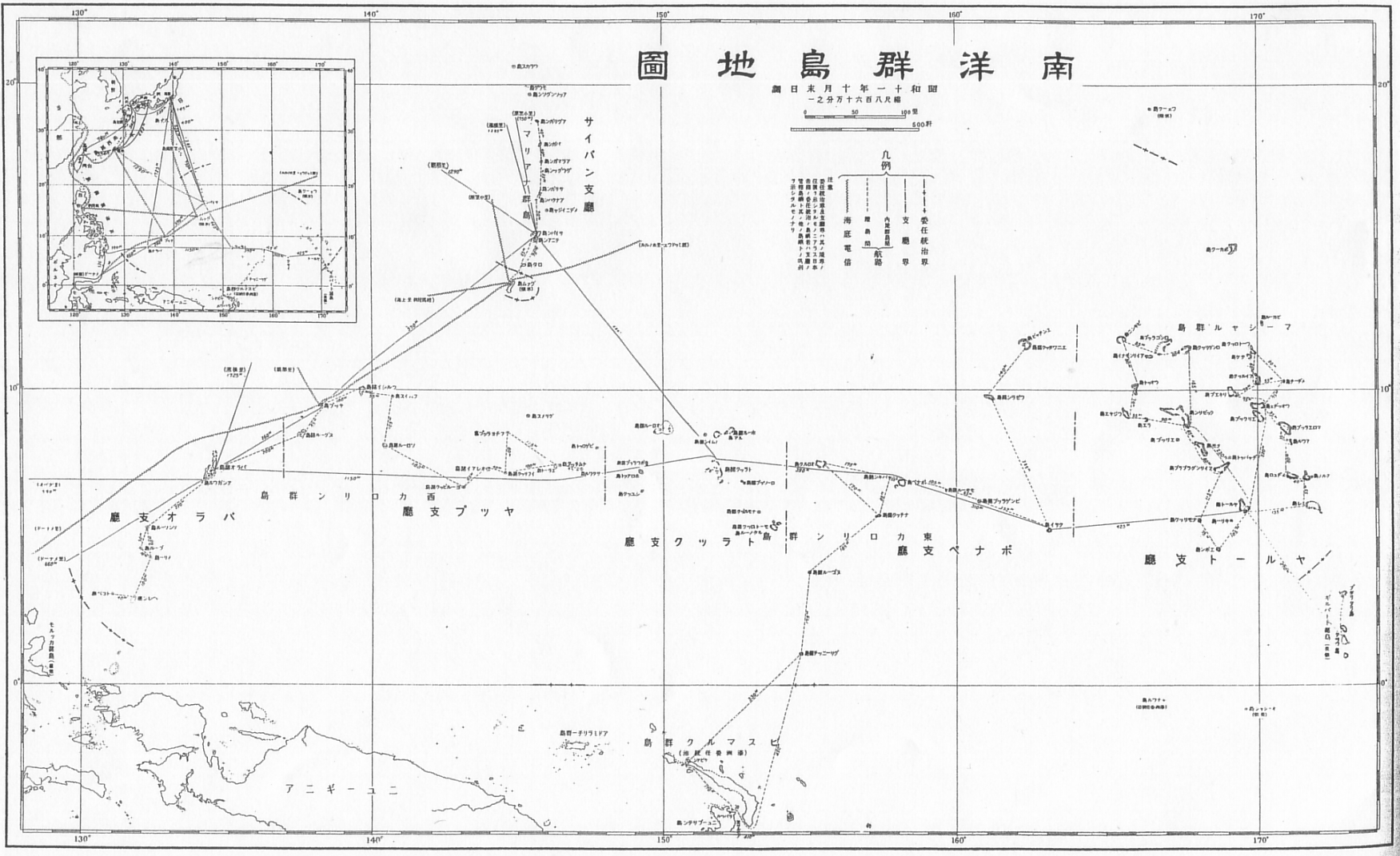
Japanese map of the South Seas Mandate in the 1930s

The Governor of the South Seas Mandate (officially known as the Director of the South Sea Agency) was an official who administered the South Seas Mandate, a Class C League of Nations mandate in the Pacific Ocean under the administration of the Empire of Japan, as part of the Japanese colonial empire, between 1922 and 1944. The territory consisted of islands awarded to Japan by the League of Nations after World War I, prior to which they had been part of the German colonial empire. During World War II, the United States captured the islands from Japan. After World War II, the United Nations placed the territory under the United States trusteeship as the Trust Territory of the Pacific Islands. The islands are now part of Palau, the Northern Mariana Islands, the Federated States of Micronesia, and the Republic of the Marshall Islands.

== List of officeholders ==
The following is a list of the governors the South Seas Mandate, as well as their predecessors during the Japanese occupation of the territory between 1914 and 1922.

(Dates in italics indicate de facto continuation of office.)

No.	Portrait	Name (Birth–Death)	Term of office		
No.	Portrait	Name (Birth–Death)	Took office	Left office	Time in office
臨時南洋群島防備隊司令官 (Rinji nan'yō guntō bōbi-tai shirei-kan) (Commander of the Interim Southern Islands Defense Unit)
1		Matsumura Tatsuo (1868–1932)	28 December 1914	6 August 1915	221 days
2		Tōgō Kichitarō (1867–1942)	6 August 1915	1 December 1916	1 year, 117 days
3		Yoshida Masujirō (1867–1942)	1 December 1916	1 December 1917	1 year
4		Nagata Yasujirō (1867–1923)	1 December 1917	1 December 1919	2 years
5		Kojūrō Nozaki (1872–1946)	1 December 1919	1 April 1922	2 years, 121 days
南洋庁民政部長 (Nan'yō-chō minsei buchō) (Director of the Department of Civil Affairs of the South Sea Agency)
6		Toshiro Tezuka (1873–1933)	1 July 1918	1 April 1922	3 years, 274 days
南洋庁長官 (Nan'yō-chō chōkan) (Director of the South Sea Agency)
(6)		Toshiro Tezuka (1873–1933)	1 April 1922	4 April 1923	1 year, 3 days
7		Gosuke Yokota (1880–1931)	4 April 1923	11 October 1931 †	8 years, 190 days
–		Mitsusada Horiguchi (1881–1939)	12 October 1931	21 November 1931	40 days
8		Kazuo Tahara (1887–1955)	21 November 1931	5 February 1932	76 days
9		Baron Masayuki Matsuda (1892–1976)	5 February 1932	4 August 1933	1 year, 180 days
10		Hisao Hayashi (1881–1963)	4 August 1933	19 September 1936	3 years, 46 days
11		Kenjiro Kitajima (1893–1957)	19 September 1936	9 April 1940	3 years, 203 days
12		Shunsuke Kondo (1890–1966)	9 April 1940	5 November 1943	3 years, 210 days
13		Boshirō Hosogaya (1888–1964)	5 November 1943	2 September 1945 (Note: Nominally to 12 March 1946.)	1 year, 301 days

== See also ==
- High Commissioner of the Trust Territory of the Pacific Islands
