= USS Salt Lake City (CA-25) =

Pensacola-class heavy cruiser

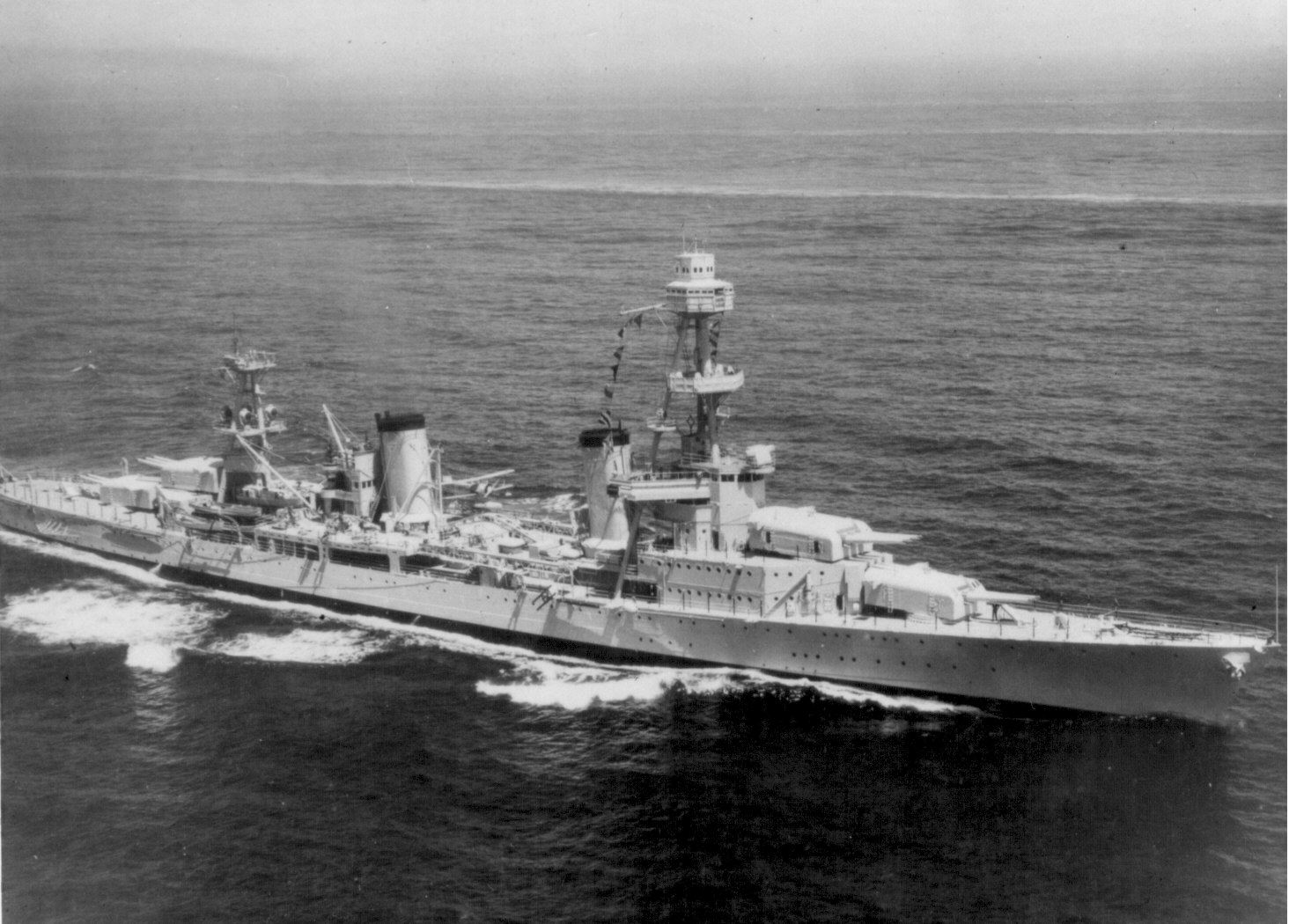
- USS Salt Lake City (CA-25), over head underway, 23 August 1935.

History

United States
- Name: Salt Lake City
- Namesake: City of Salt Lake City, Utah
- Ordered: 18 December 1924
- Awarded: 9 July 1926; 16 April 1927 (supplementary contract)
- Builder: New York Shipbuilding Corporation, Camden, New Jersey
- Cost: $8,673,833 (limit of cost)
- Laid down: 9 June 1927
- Launched: 23 January 1929
- Sponsored by: Miss Helen Budge
- Commissioned: 11 December 1929
- Decommissioned: 29 August 1946
- Reclassified: CA-25, 1 July 1931
- Stricken: 18 June 1948
- Identification: Hull symbol: CL-25; Hull symbol: CA-25; Code letters: NISK
- Nickname(s): "Swayback Maru"
- Honors and awards: 11 × Battle stars; Navy Unit Commendation
- Fate: Sunk as target on 25 May 1948, 130 miles off the Southern California coast
- Notes: Designated as a test ship for Operation Crossroads at Bikini Atoll; Survived atomic aerial burst, 1 July 1946; Survived atomic subsurface burst, 25 July 1946

General characteristics (as built)
- Class & type: Pensacola-class cruiser
- Displacement: 9,100 long tons (9,246 t) (standard)
- Length: 585 ft 6 in (178.46 m) oa; 558 ft (170 m) pp
- Beam: 65 ft 3 in (19.89 m)
- Draft: 16 ft 2 in (4.93 m) (mean); 22 ft (6.7 m) (max)
- Installed power: 12 × White-Forster boilers; 107,000 shp (80,000 kW)
- Propulsion: 4 × Parsons reduction steam turbines; 4 × screws
- Speed: 32.7 kn (37.6 mph; 60.6 km/h)
- Range: 10,000 nmi (12,000 mi; 19,000 km) at 15 kn (17 mph; 28 km/h)
- Capacity: 1,500 short tons (1,400 t) fuel oil
- Complement: 87 officers 576 enlisted
- Sensors & processing systems: CXAM radar from 1940
- Armament: 10 × 8 in (203 mm)/55 caliber guns (2×3, 2×2); 4 × 5 in (127 mm)/25 caliber anti-aircraft guns; 2 × 3-pounder 47 mm (1.9 in) saluting guns; 6 × 21 in (533 mm) torpedo tubes (2×3)
- Armor: Belt: 2 1/2–4 in (64–102 mm); Deck: 1–1 3/4 in (25–44 mm); Barbettes: 3/4 in (19 mm); Turrets: 3/4–2 1/2 in (19–64 mm); Conning Tower: 1 1/4 in (32 mm)
- Aircraft carried: 4 × floatplanes
- Aviation facilities: 2 × Amidship catapults

General characteristics (1942)
- Armament: 10 × 8 in (203 mm)/55 caliber guns (2×3, 2×2); 8 × 5 in (127 mm)/25 caliber anti-aircraft guns; 2 × 3-pounder 47 mm (1.9 in) saluting guns; 4 × 1.1 in (27.9 mm)/75 anti-aircraft guns; 8 × single 20 mm (0.79 in) Oerlikon cannons

General characteristics (1945)
- Armament: 10 × 8 in (203 mm)/55 caliber guns (2×3, 2×2); 8 × 5 in (127 mm)/25 caliber anti-aircraft guns; 2 × 3-pounder 47 mm (1.9 in) saluting guns; 6 × quad 40 mm (1.6 in) Bofors guns; 19 × single 20 mm (0.79 in) Oerlikon cannons

USS Salt Lake City (CL/CA-25) of the United States Navy was a Pensacola-class cruiser, later reclassified as a heavy cruiser, sometimes known as "Swayback Maru" or "Old Swayback". She had 11 battle stars for the eleven engagements she participated in. She was also the first ship to be named after Salt Lake City, Utah.

She was laid down on 9 June 1927, by the American Brown Boveri Electric Corporation, a subsidiary of the New York Shipbuilding Corporation, at Camden, New Jersey; launched on 23 January 1929, sponsored by Helen Budge, a granddaughter of leading Mormon missionary William Budge; and commissioned on 11 December 1929, at the Philadelphia Navy Yard.

== Service history ==
=== Inter-war period ===
Salt Lake City departed Philadelphia on 20 January 1930, for shakedown trials off the Maine coast. She began her first extended cruise on 10 February; visited Guantánamo Bay, Cuba; Culebra, Virgin Islands; Rio de Janeiro and Bahia, Brazil; then returned to Guantanamo Bay, where—on 31 March—she joined Cruiser Division 2 (CruDiv 2) of the Scouting Force. With this division, she operated along the New England coast until 12 September, when she was reassigned to CruDiv 5. Salt Lake City then operated off New York City, Cape Cod, and Chesapeake Bay through 1931.

Originally CL-25, effective 1 July 1931, Salt Lake City was redesignated CA-25 in accordance with the provisions of the London Naval Treaty of 1930.

Early in 1932, Salt Lake City—with Chicago and Louisville—steamed to the West Coast for fleet maneuvers. They arrived at San Pedro, California, on 7 March, and following the scheduled exercises, were reassigned to the Pacific Fleet. Salt Lake City visited Pearl Harbor in January–February 1933; and, in September, she was attached to CruDiv 4. From October 1933-January 1934, she underwent overhaul at the Puget Sound Naval Shipyard; then resumed duty with CruDiv 4. In May, she sailed for New York to participate in the Fleet Review and returned to San Pedro on 18 December.

Through 1935, Salt Lake City ranged the West Coast from San Diego to Seattle. In the first months of 1936, she conducted extensive gunnery exercises at San Clemente Island, and on 27 April departed San Pedro to participate in combined surface-subsurface operations at Balboa, Panama Canal Zone. Salt Lake City returned to San Pedro on 15 June and resumed West Coast operations until sailing for Hawaii on 25 April 1937. She returned to the West Coast on 20 May.

Her next extended cruise began on 13 January 1939, when she departed for the Caribbean, via the Panama Canal. During the next three months, she visited Panama, Colombia, the Virgin Islands, Trinidad, Cuba, and Haiti; returning to San Pedro on 7 April. From 12 October 1939 – 25 June 1940, she cruised between Pearl Harbor, Wake, and Guam, utilizing the services of Vestal while at Pearl Harbor. In August 1941, she visited Brisbane, Queensland, Australia.

=== After Pearl Harbor ===
On 7 December 1941, when the United States was brought into World War II by the Japanese attack on Pearl Harbor, Salt Lake City—under the command of Capt. Ellis M. Zacharias—was with the Enterprise task group 200 nmi (230 mi; 370 km) west of Pearl Harbor, returning from Wake Island, when they received word of the attack. The group immediately launched scouting planes in hopes of catching possible stragglers from the Japanese force, but the search proved fruitless. The ships entered Pearl Harbor toward sundown on the 8th.

After a tedious night refueling, they sortied before dawn to hunt submarines north of the islands. Submarines were encountered on the 10th-11th. The first—I-70—was sunk by dive bombers from Enterprise; the second—sighted ahead of the group on the surface—was engaged with gunfire by Salt Lake City as the ships maneuvered to avoid torpedoes. Screening destroyers made numerous depth charge runs, but no kill was confirmed. Operations against a third contact brought similar results. The group returned to Pearl Harbor on 15 December to refuel.

Salt Lake City operated with Task Force 8 (TF 8) until 23 December, covering Oahu and supporting the task force strike that was planned to relieve beleaguered Wake Island. After Wake fell, Salt Lake City's group moved to cover the reinforcement of Midway and then Samoa.

In February, Enterprise's task force carried out air strikes in the eastern Marshalls at Wotje, Maloelap, and Kwajalein to reduce enemy seaplane bases. While conducting shore bombardment during those strikes, Salt Lake City came under air attack and assisted in downing two Japanese bombers. In March, she supported air strikes at Marcus Island.

In April, she escorted TF 16, which launched the Doolittle Raid on Tokyo and other Japanese cities, and returned to Pearl Harbor on 25 April. Orders awaited the ships to sail as soon as possible to join the Yorktown and Lexington forces in the Coral Sea. Although the task force moved fast, it had only reached a point some 450 mi (390 nmi; 720 km) east of Tulagi by 8 May, the day of the Battle of the Coral Sea. What followed was essentially a retirement, and Salt Lake City operated as cover with her group; on the 11th off the New Hebrides, and from the 12th-16th eastward from Efate and Santa Cruz. On 16 May, she was ordered back to Pearl Harbor and arrived there 10 days later.

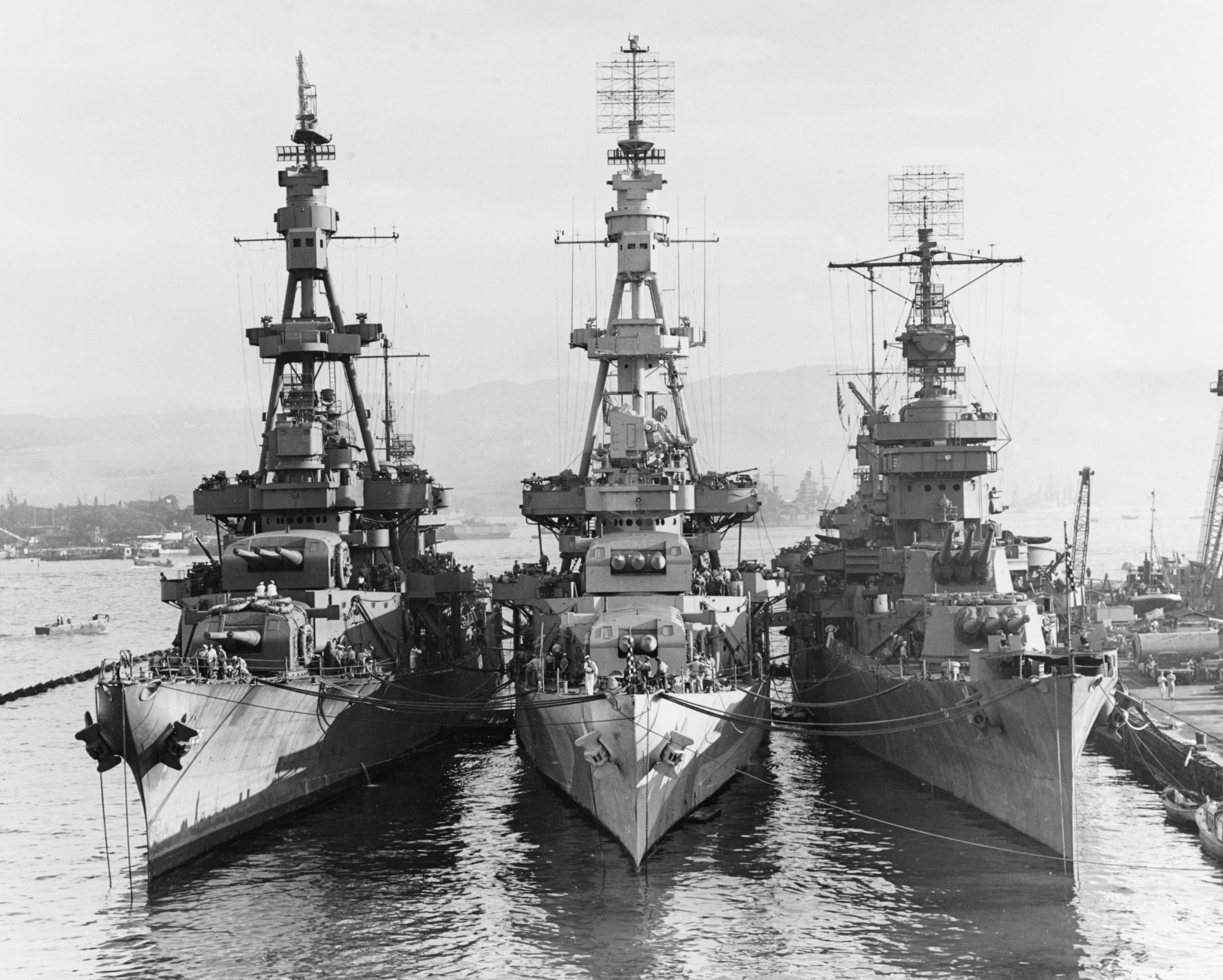
Sister ships Salt Lake City and Pensacola, with New Orleans (L to R), at Pearl Harbor in 1943

The carrier groups began intensive preparations to meet the expected Japanese thrust at Midway Atoll. During the battle, early in June, Salt Lake City provided rear guard protection for the islands.

From August–October 1942, Salt Lake City was in the south Pacific to support the campaign to seize and hold Guadalcanal. She escorted Wasp during the landings of 7–8 August and subsequent operations.

Salt Lake City protected Wasp as she shuttled planes for Saratoga and Enterprise, and provided Combat Air Patrol (CAP) and scouting patrols during the landings. Salt Lake City was with Wasp on 15 September when the carrier was torpedoed by Japanese submarines and sunk. She assisted in rescue operations for survivors, and took on board others who had been picked up by Lardner.

=== Battle of Cape Esperance ===
The campaign in the Solomons had developed into a grim struggle requiring the US Navy to commit heavy and light cruisers to savage night battles. On the night of 11–12 October in the Battle of Cape Esperance. TF 64 was formed around Salt Lake City, Boise, Helena, and San Francisco to attack the "Tokyo Express", a steady flow of Japanese vessels maintaining reinforcement and resupply to Guadalcanal. The force was not considered large enough to get involved with a major Japanese covering force; they were interested primarily in inflicting maximum damage to the transports. They arrived off Espiritu Santo on 7 October, and for two days steamed near Guadalcanal and waited. Land-based search-plane reports came in that an enemy force was steaming down The Slot; that night, TF 64 moved to the vicinity of Savo Island to intercept it.

Search planes were ordered launched from the cruisers, but in the process of launching, Salt Lake City′s plane caught fire as flares ignited in the cockpit. The plane crashed close to the ship and the pilot managed to get free. He was later found safe on a nearby island. The brilliant fire was seen in the darkness by the Japanese flag officers, who assumed that it was a signal flare from the landing force which they were sent to protect. The Japanese flagship answered with blinker light. Despite receiving no reply, they continued to signal. The American force formed a battle line at right angles to the Japanese T-formation, and thus were able to enfilade the enemy ships. The American cruisers opened fire and continued scoring hits for a full seven minutes before the confused Japanese realized what was taking place. They had believed that their own forces were taking them under fire. When the Japanese warships replied, their fire was too little and too late. The action was over in half an hour. One Japanese cruiser, the Furutaka, sank; the flagship cruiser Aoba was severely damaged and required several months of repairs; a third cruiser, Kinugasa, was lightly damaged; and the destroyer Fubuki was sunk. Only a single destroyer of the five-ship force escaped damage. Of the American ships, Salt Lake City sustained three major hits during the action; Boise was severely damaged but managed to rejoin the group under her own power; and Duncan was left gutted off Savo Island. The ships formed up and steamed to Espiritu Santo.

=== Battle of the Komandorski Islands ===
Salt Lake City spent the next four months at Pearl Harbor undergoing repairs and replenishing. Late in March 1943, she departed for the Aleutian Islands and operated from Adak Island to prevent the Japanese from supporting their garrisons on Attu and Kiska. Operating in TF 8, Salt Lake City was accompanied by Richmond and four destroyers when they made contact on 26 March with some Japanese transports, escorted by the heavy cruisers Nachi and Maya, the light cruisers Tama and Abukuma, and four destroyers, led by Vice Admiral Boshiro Hosogaya leading to the Battle of the Komandorski Islands.

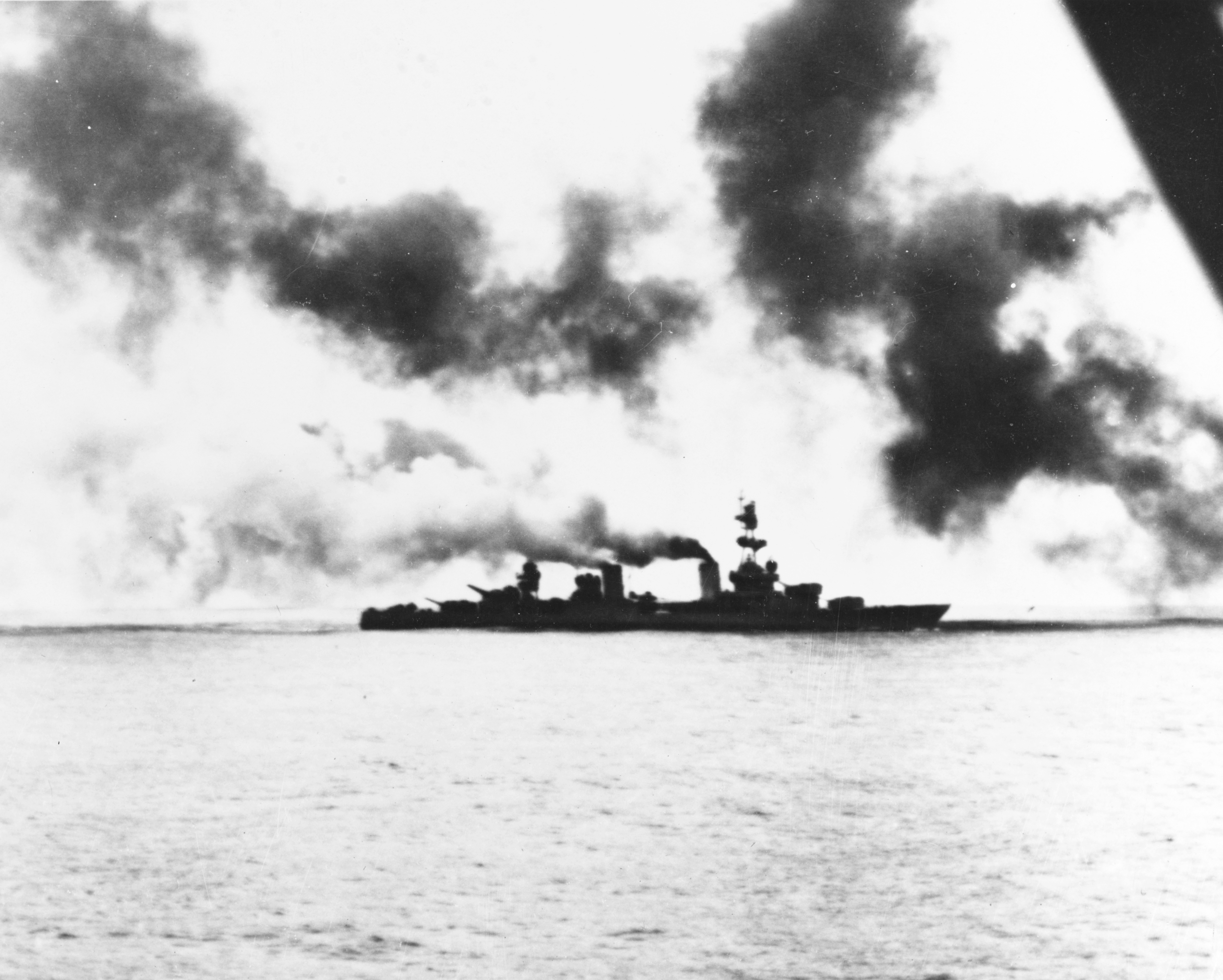
Salt Lake City, damaged by Japanese cruiser gunfire, starts losing speed prior to going dead in the water during the battle under a smoke screen laid by accompanying destroyers.

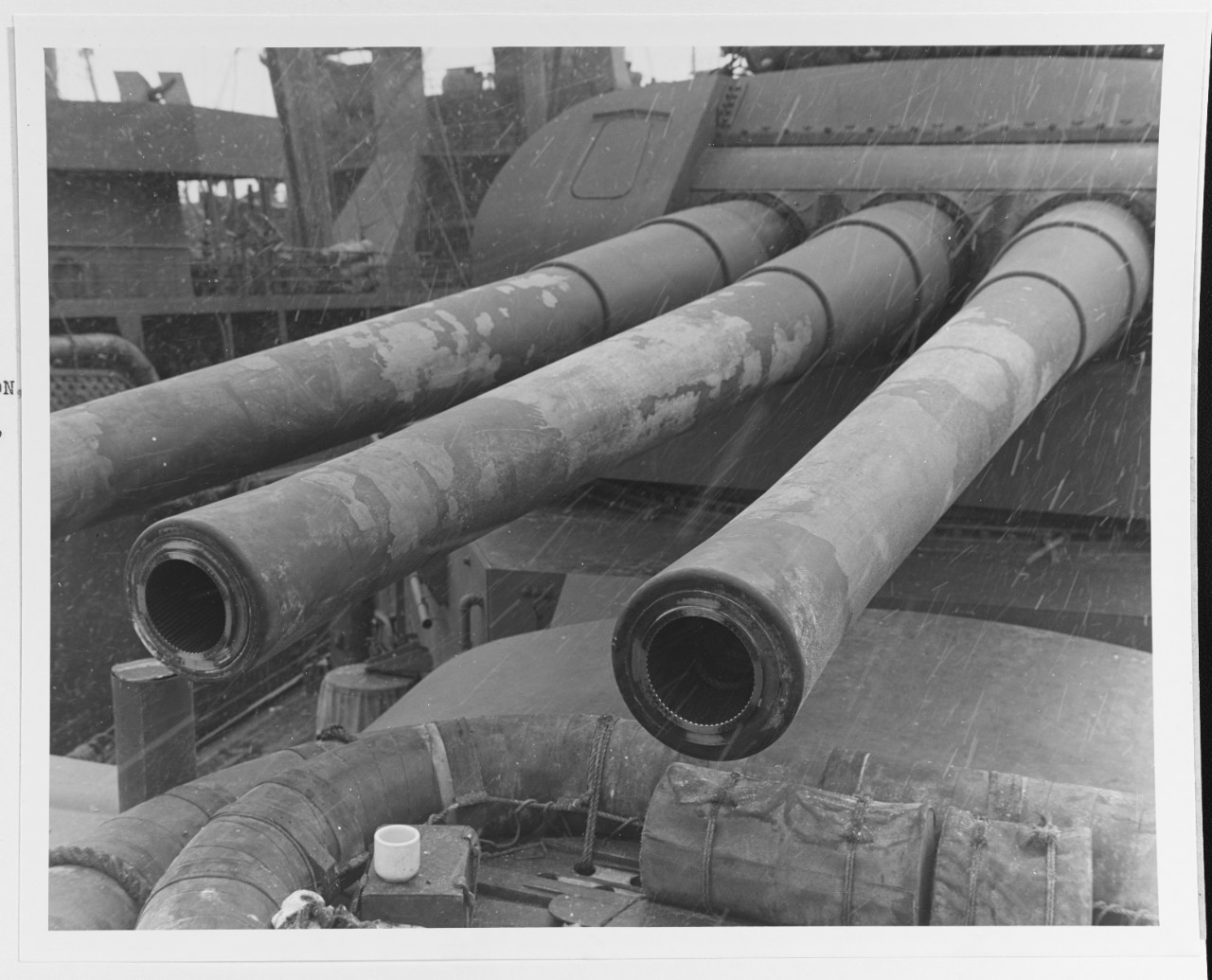
Aftermath with effects of heavy gun usage on Salt Lake City's guns

Believing that easy pickings were in store, the American warships formed up and closed the range. Two transports fled for safety as the Japanese warships turned to engage. The American group was outgunned and outnumbered, but pressed on and made a course change in hopes of getting a shot at the transports before the escorts could intervene. There was also a possibility that the Japanese would split their force and that Salt Lake City and Richmond could tackle a portion of them on more equal terms.

The opposing cruisers simultaneously opened fire at a range of 20,000 yd (18,000 m). The ensuing battle was a retiring action on the part of the Americans, for the Japanese foiled their attempt to get to the auxiliaries. Salt Lake City received most of the attention and soon received two hits, one of them amidships, mortally wounding two men, but she responded with very accurate fire. Her rudder stops were carried away, limiting her to 10° course changes. The starboard seaplane caught fire and was jettisoned. Another hit soon flooded forward compartments. Under cover of a thick smoke screen and aggressive torpedo attacks by the destroyers, the American cruisers were able to make an evasive turn, which for a while allowed the range to open. Salt Lake City soon began taking hits again and her boiler fires died one by one. Salt water had entered the fuel oil feed lines. There was now cause for grave concern; she lay dead in the water, and the Japanese ships were closing fast. Luckily, she was hidden in the smoke, and the enemy was not aware of her plight.

The destroyers charged the Japanese cruisers and began to draw the fire away from the damaged Salt Lake City. Bailey suffered two 8 in (200 mm) hits while launching a spread of five torpedoes at long range. In the meantime, Salt Lake City′s engineers purged the fuel lines and fired the boilers. With fresh oil supplying the fires, she built up steam and gained headway. Suddenly, the Japanese began to withdraw. This was due to the combination of the Japanese having intercepted demands for air support from the American forces, and the mistaken belief that the high explosive shells being fired in desperation by the American cruisers were air-dropped bombs. The Japanese forces were also fast exhausting their ammunition and fuel. They did not suspect that the Americans were in far worse shape in terms of both ammunition and fuel.

Despite being outnumbered two to one, the Americans succeeded in their purpose. The Japanese attempt to reinforce their bases in the Aleutians had failed and they turned tail and headed home. Salt Lake City later covered the American liberation of Attu and Kiska which ended the Aleutian Campaign. She departed Adak on 23 September and sailed, via San Francisco, to Pearl Harbor where she arrived on 14 October.

=== After the Aleutian Campaign ===
The Allied offensive strategy in the Pacific now focused on the Marshall Islands. A two-column thrust through Micronesia and the Bismarck Archipelago would force the enemy to disperse his forces, deny him the opportunity for a flanking movement, and provide the Allies with the choice of where and when to strike next. To obtain adequate intelligence for planning the Marshalls operation, the Gilbert Islands would have to be secured for use as a staging area and launch point for photographic missions. Salt Lake City was assigned to Task Group 50.3 (TG 50.3) of the Southern Carrier Group for the Gilbert Islands Campaign, Operation Galvanic.

Salt Lake City conducted rigorous gunnery training until 8 November, when she sailed to join Essex, Bunker Hill, and Independence which had carried out preliminary strikes on Wake, as a diversion on 5–6 October, and at Rabaul on 11 November. Salt Lake City joined on the 13th off Funafuti, Ellice Islands, following the carriers' fueling rendezvous at Espiritu Santo. She then saw action on the 19th as she bombarded Betio at Tarawa Atoll, in the Gilberts. That day and the next, she fought off repeated torpedo plane attacks aimed for the flattops. Tarawa was secured by the 28th. This was the first Pacific amphibious operation to be vigorously opposed at the beach, and many lessons were learned here to be applied in the island campaigns to follow.

Salt Lake City was attached to the Neutralization Group—TG 50.15—for the long-awaited Marshalls Campaign. From 29 January-17 February 1944, she conducted shore bombardment at Wotje and Taroa islands which were bypassed and cut off from support as the major forces concentrated on Majuro, Eniwetok, and Kwajalein. This leapfrog technique worked well and eliminated the needless casualties that would result in mopping up every Japanese-held island. On 30 March–1 April, Salt Lake City participated in raids on Palau, Yap, Ulithi, and Woleai in the western Caroline Islands archipelago. The cruiser anchored at Majuro on 6 April and remained until 25 April, when she sailed—unescorted—for Pearl Harbor.

Salt Lake City arrived at Pearl Harbor on 30 April and sailed the next day for Mare Island Naval Shipyard. She arrived on 7 May and operated in the San Francisco Bay area until 1 July. She then proceeded to Adak, Alaska arriving on the 8th. In the Aleutians, her operations, including a scheduled bombardment at Paramushiro were curtailed by severe weather, and she returned to Pearl Harbor on 13 August.

Salt Lake City sortied with Pensacola and Monterey on 29 August to attack Wake Island. They shelled that island on 3 September, and then proceeded to Eniwetok to remain until the 24th. The cruisers then moved to Saipan for patrol duty after which, on 6 October, they proceeded to Marcus Island to create a diversion in connection with raids on Formosa. They shelled Marcus on 9 September and returned to Saipan.

In October, during the second Battle of the Philippine Sea, Salt Lake City returned to screen and support duty with the carrier strike groups against Japanese bases and surface craft. Based at Ulithi, she supported the carriers between 15 and 26 October. From 8 November 1944 – 25 January 1945, she operated with CruDiv 5, TF 54, in bombardment against the Volcano Islands to neutralize airfields through which the Japanese staged bombing raids on the B-29 Superfortresses based at Saipan. These raids were coordinated with B-24 Liberator strikes. In February, she operated in the Gunfire and Covering Force—Task Force 54—during the final phases of securing Iwo Jima and the initial operations in the campaign for the invasion of Okinawa.

Salt Lake City provided call-fire at Iwo Jima until 13 March, and then concentrated her activities at Okinawa until 28 May, when she put into Leyte for repairs and upkeep. She returned to Okinawa to cover minesweeping operations and general patrol in the East China Sea as part of Task Force 95 on 6 July. A month later, on 8 August, she sailed for the Aleutians via Saipan. While en route to Adak, she received word on 31 August to proceed to northern Honshū, Japan, to cover the occupation of Ominato Naval Base.

=== Post-war ===
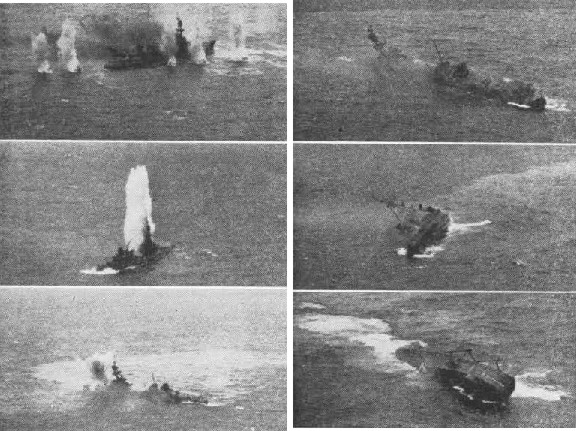
Salt Lake City being sunk as a target ship on 25 May 1948

Like many warships at the close of the war, Salt Lake City was almost immediately slated for deactivation. She was originally ordered to report to Commander, 3rd Fleet, upon arrival on the West Coast, in October, for deactivation. On 29 October, however, she was diverted to Operation Magic Carpet duty to return veterans of the Pacific theater to the U.S.

On 14 November, she was added to the list of warships to be used as test vessels for Operation Crossroads, the Atomic Bomb Experiments and Evaluation Tests at Bikini Atoll. She was partially stripped and her crew reduced prior to sailing to Pearl Harbor in March 1946.

Salt Lake City was used in evaluating the effects on surface vessels during an initial test with an aerial atomic bomb burst on 1 July and during the second test of a subsurface burst on 25 July. Surviving two atomic bomb blasts, she was decommissioned on 29 August and laid up to await ultimate disposal. She was sunk as a target hull on 25 May 1948, 130 mi (110 nmi; 210 km) off the coast of Southern California and stricken from the Naval Vessel Register on 18 June 1948. Records preserved by the National Archives and Records Administration place the location of the wreckage at approximately 31°57'12.0"N 119°54'24.0"W, at 1800 fathoms deep.

== Awards ==
Salt Lake City received 11 battle stars for her World War II service, and a Navy Unit Commendation for her actions during the Aleutian Campaign.

== In fiction ==
In the 1965 film In Harm's Way, a cruiser called Old Swayback was the cruiser commanded by Captain Rockwell Torrey (John Wayne) at the time of the attack on Pearl Harbor.

== In popular culture ==
=== Video games ===
The Salt Lake City was present on the test server for World of Warships during the test for the US cruiser line overhaul in 2018. It served as a testing analogue for USS Pensacola's then-pending relocation, as the latter vessel's gameplay stats had been reduced to reflect her new placement earlier in the game's progression. It was removed after the updated tech tree was published to the live server.

=== University of Utah ===
In August 2021, the University of Utah football team announced they would use grey uniforms during their 20 November 2021 game against Oregon to pay tribute to the Salt Lake City including "dazzle-camo accents" on the shoulders and sides of the pants and a single battle star on the right shoulder — 11 altogether when the team is on the field — that represents the 11 battle stars the ship earned in its 19-year history. The helmets were hand painted to resemble the ship in battle. The Utes won the nationally televised game 38-7.
