= Delmas =

Delmas may refer to:

== People ==
=== Surname ===
- Antoine Guillaume Delmas (1766–1813), French revolutionary and Napoleonic general
- Benjamin Delmas (born 1976), French ice dancer
- Bert Delmas (1911–1979), American baseball player
- Calixte Delmas (1906–1927), French wrestler and rugby player
- François Delmas (1913–2002), French politician
- Jean-François Delmas (bass-baritone) (1861–1933), or Francisque Delmas, French opera singer
- Jean-François Delmas (palaeographer) (born 1964), French palaeographer and librarian
- Jean-François-Bertrand Delmas (1751–1798), French revolutionary politician
- Jean-Jacques Delmas (1938–2010), French physician
- Julián Delmás (born 1995), Spanish footballer
- Louis Delmas (born 1987), American footballer
- Robert Delmas (born 1955), French aeronautical engineer, after whom 11147 Delmas is named
- Marc Delmas (1885–1931), French expressionist composer and writer
- Nicole Delma, American reality show contestant on Survivor: Pearl Islands
- Serge Delmas (born 1947), French footballer
- Sophie Delmas (fl. from 1996), French actress and singer
- Victor Delmas (born 1991), French rugby player
- Julián Delmás (born 1995), Spanish footballer
- Miloš Đelmaš (born 1960), Serbian footballer
- Raša Đelmaš (1950–2021), Serbian rock musician

=== Given name ===
- Delmas Del Ballard Jr. (born 1963), American bowler
- Delmas Carl Hill (1906–1989), American judge
- Delmas Del Hodgkinson (born 1939), English former rugby league footballer
- Delmas Howe (born 1935), American painter and muralist
- Delmas H. Nucker (1907–1985), American High Commissioner of the Trust Territory of the Pacific Islands
- Delmas Obou (born 1991), Italian sprinter

== Fictional characters ==
- Elisabeth and Jean-Pierre Delmas, in the French animated television series Code Lyoko
