= High Commissioner of the Trust Territory of the Pacific Islands =

US administrative office (1947–1994)

- The seal of the Trust Territory of the Pacific Islands

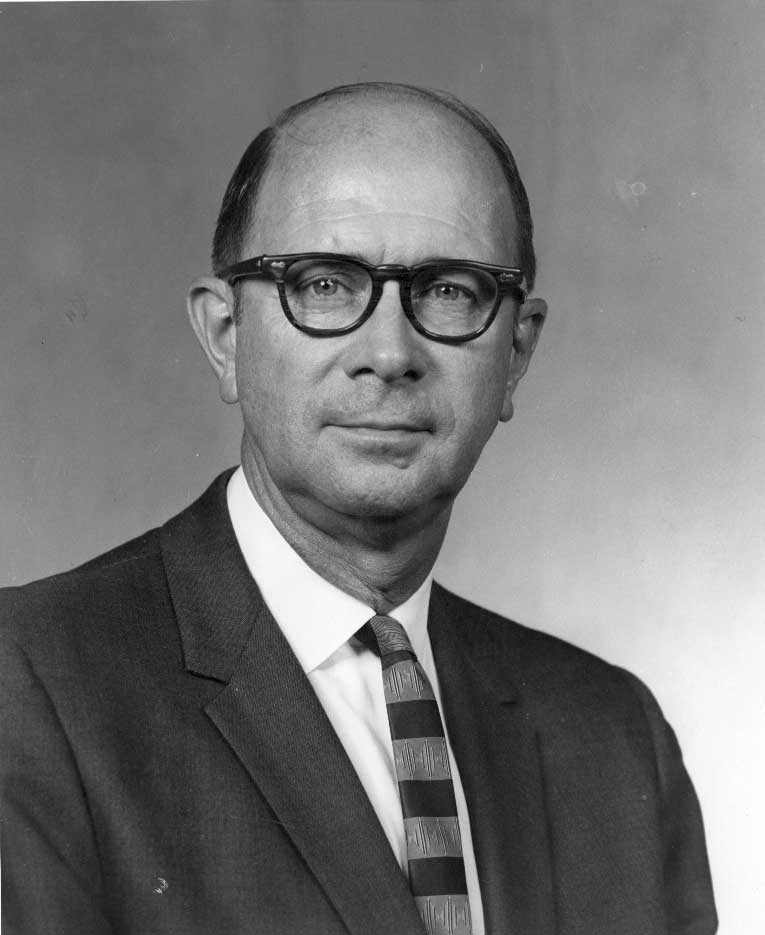
- Longest serving Edward E. Johnston; 1 May 1969–1 July 1976
- Seat: Saipan
- Appointer: President of the United States
- Precursor: Governor of the South Seas Mandate
- Formation: 18 July 1947
- First holder: Louis E. Denfeld
- Final holder: Janet J. McCoy
- Abolished: 10 July 1987

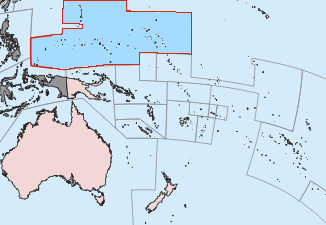
Location of the Trust Territory of the Pacific Islands (bordered in red) in the Pacific Ocean.

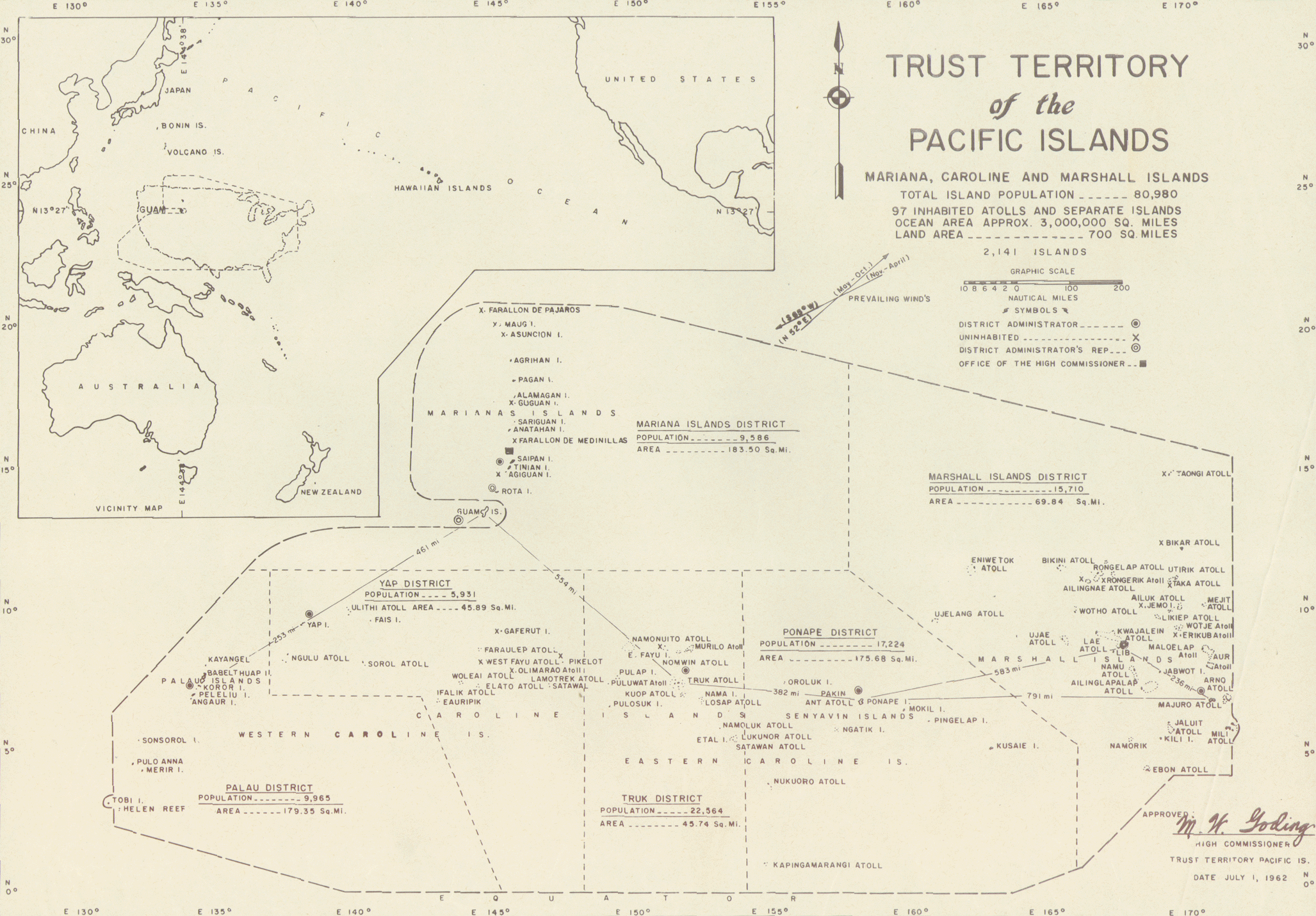
Map of the Trust Territory of the Pacific Islands in 1961.

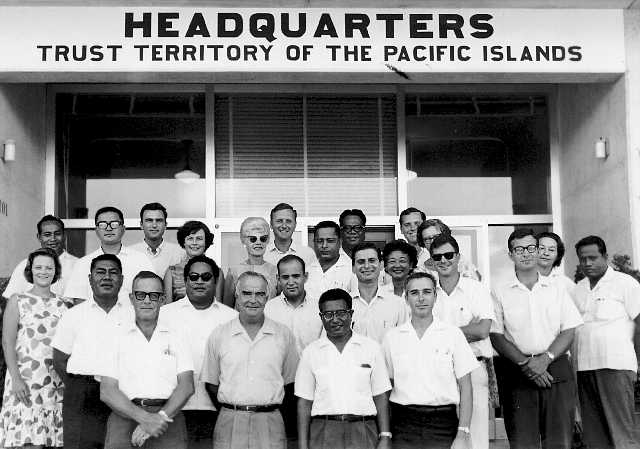
TTPI High Commissioner and staff, 1960s.

The High Commissioner of the Trust Territory of the Pacific Islands was an official who administered the Trust Territory of the Pacific Islands (TTPI), a United Nations trusteeship in the Pacific Ocean under the administration of the United States, between 1947 and 1994. The territory consisted of islands captured by America during World War II, prior to which they had been part of the Empire of Japan as the South Seas Mandate, within the Japanese colonial empire. After World War II, United Nations Security Council Resolution 21 placed the territory under the United States trusteeship as the Trust Territory of the Pacific Islands. The islands are now part of Palau, the Northern Mariana Islands, the Federated States of Micronesia, and the Republic of the Marshall Islands.

== History ==
The High Commissioner of the Trust Territory of the Pacific Islands was developed out of the military governor of occupied Japanese Pacific islands captured by the United States during the Second World War. In 1947, following the United States agreeing to take the islands on as a Trust Territory, the President of the United States ordered the end of military rule and that civilian government be installed. The first few High Commissioners were members of the United States Navy. In 1951, Elbert D. Thomas became the first civilian High Commissioner.

Eventually, the individual entities within the Trust Territory gradually voted for independence. Palau was the last remaining Trust as it failed to reach a 75% approval rating to join the Compact of Free Association. The High Commissioner was abolished in 1987 with the last holder Janet J. McCoy attending flag lowering ceremonies on all the territories.

== List of officeholders ==
The following is a list of the high commissioner of the Trust Territory of the Pacific Islands, as well as their predecessors during the American occupation of the territory between 1944 and 1947.

(Dates in italics indicate de facto continuation of office)

No.	Portrait	Name (Birth–Death)	Term of office		
No.	Portrait	Name (Birth–Death)	Took office	Left office	Time in office
United States Navy control
Military Governor
1		John H. Hoover (1887–1970)	March 1944	19 June 1944	3 months
Military Governor and CINCPACFLT
2		Chester W. Nimitz (1885–1966)	19 June 1944	24 November 1945	1 year, 158 days
3		Raymond A. Spruance (1885–1969)	24 November 1945	3 February 1946	71 days
4		John H. Towers (1885–1955)	3 February 1946	28 February 1947	1 year, 25 days
5		Louis E. Denfeld (1891–1972)	28 February 1947	18 July 1947	140 days
Trust Territory of the Pacific Islands
High Commissioner and CINCPACFLT
1 (Note: Numbering restarted for civil (rather than military) office.)		Louis E. Denfeld (1891–1972)	18 July 1947	17 April 1948	274 days
2		DeWitt Clinton Ramsey (1888–1961)	17 April 1948	1 May 1949	1 year, 14 days
3		Arthur W. Radford (1896–1973)	1 May 1949	6 January 1951	1 year, 250 days
High Commissioner
4		Elbert D. Thomas (1883–1953)	6 January 1951	11 February 1953 †	2 years, 36 days
5		Frank E. Midkiff (1887–1983)	13 March 1953	1 September 1954	1 year, 172 days
–		Delmas H. Nucker (1907–1985)	1 September 1954	November 1956	6 years, 242 days
6		Delmas H. Nucker (1907–1985)	November 1956	1 May 1961	6 years, 242 days
7		Maurice W. Goding (1911–1989)	1 May 1961	27 May 1966	5 years, 26 days
–		William R. Norwood (1909–1981)	27 May 1966	1 August 1966	2 years, 339 days
8		William R. Norwood (1909–1981)	1 August 1966	1 May 1969	2 years, 339 days
9		Edward E. Johnston (1918–2011)	1 May 1969	1 July 1976	7 years, 61 days
–		Peter Tali Coleman (1919–1997)	1 July 1976	February 1977	7 months
–		James Boyd Mackenzie (1918–1978)	February 1977	9 July 1977	5 months
10		Adrian P. Winkel (1915–1994)	9 July 1977	1981	3–4 years
–		Daniel Joseph High (born 1938)	1981	December 1981	0 years
11		Janet J. McCoy (1916–1995)	December 1981	10 July 1987	5 years, 7 months
Director of the Office of Transition
12		Charles D. Jordan	3 November 1986	30 September 1991	4 years, 331 days

== Palau ==
Palau continued to be administered by the Office of Territorial and International Affairs (presently the Office of Insular Affairs), a unit of the United States Department of the Interior until May 25, 1994.

== See also ==
- Governor of the South Seas Mandate
- Congress of the Trust Territory of the Pacific Islands
