= Janet J. McCoy =

American politician and businesswoman (1916–1995)

Janet McCoy

High Commissioner of the Trust Territory of the Pacific Islands
- In office December 7, 1981 – July 10, 1987
- Preceded by: Adrian P. Winkel
- Succeeded by: Chuck Jordan (Transition Director)

Personal details
- Born: July 31, 1916 Saginaw, Michigan, U.S.
- Died: August 4, 1995 (aged 79) Scottsburg, Oregon, U.S.
- Party: Republican
- Education: Wayne State University (BA)

Janet J. McCoy (July 31, 1916 – August 4, 1995) was an American politician and businesswoman who served as the last High Commissioner of the Trust Territory of the Pacific Islands from 1981 to 1986.

== Biography ==
Born in Saginaw, Michigan, McCoy went to Wayne State University. During World War II, McCoy served in the Women's Army Corps as one of the first officer candidates. After the war, McCoy was in the radio, television broadcasting and tourism business in California. McCoy was involved in the Republican Party political campaigns of Richard Nixon and Ronald Reagan.

McCoy served as the last High Commissioner of the Trust Territory of the Pacific Islands under Reagan, 1981–1986. After her term, the territories began their transition to independence. McCoy died in Scottsburg, Oregon in 1995.

== Notes ==
Political offices
Preceded by Adrian P. Winkel	High Commissioner of the Trust Territory of the Pacific Islands; 1981–1987	Succeeded by Chuck Jordan as Director of the Transition of the Trust Territory of the Pacific Islands
