= List of countries formerly ruled by the United States =

The United States, throughout its history, has had political, military, and administrative control over various regions and countries across the world. These territories were often acquired through war, treaties, or other diplomatic means.

== List of occupied territories ==
The following is a list of countries that were once under the rule or administration of the United States, either through direct control or as protectorates and trusteeships:

Name of territory	Dates	Status	Comments
The Philippines	1898–1946	Unincorporated territory	First under military administration, later under an insular government in preparation for independence
Cuba	1898–1902	Provisional military government	Under military administration after Spain ceded Cuba to the United States
Puerto Rico	1898–Present	Unincorporated territory	Initially under military governance, later establishing civilian government under the Foraker Act
Panama Canal Zone	1903–1979	Concession of the United States in Panama	First administered under the Isthmian Canal Commission, but later governorship was awarded for the Panama Canal Zone
Haiti	1915–1934	Military occupation	Occupied for the financial interests of the United States in the stabilization of Haiti, a part of the Banana Wars
Dominican Republic	1916–1924	Provisional military government	Occupied for the sake of debt repayment to European creditors
Nicaragua	1912–1933	Military occupation	Occupied for the financial interests of the United States, moreso the prevention of the construction of the Nicaragua Canal, a part of the Banana Wars
Japan (Mainland)	1945–1952	Military occupation	Occupied after the end of World War II until the Treaty of San Francisco
Japan (Ryukyu Island)	1950–1972	Military occupation	Occupied after the end of World War II until the Okinawa Reversion Agreement
South Korea	1945–1948	Provisional military government	Occupied in response to the Soviet Civil Administration
Marshall Islands (TTPI)	1947–1994	United Nations Trust Territory under U.S. administration	Under U.S. administration in enforcement of UNSC 21
Palau (TTPI)	1947–1994	United Nations Trust Territory under U.S. administration	Under U.S. administration in enforcement of UNSC 21
Micronesia (TTPI)	1947–1994	United Nations Trust Territory under U.S. administration	Under U.S. administration in enforcement of UNSC 21
Germany	1945–1955	Military occupation	Occupied in enforcement of the Potsdam Agreement, agreed upon after the end of World War II
Austria	1945–1955	Military occupation	Occupied in enforcement of the Moscow Conference, agreed upon after the end of World War II
Iraq	2003–2011	Provisional military government	Occupied after the 2003 invasion of Iraq in the midst of Iraq's transition from Saddam Hussein's government

== See also ==
- List of states and territories of the United States
- Territorial evolution of the United States
