= Midkiff =

Midkiff may refer to:

== Locations ==
- Midkiff, Texas
- Midkiff, West Virginia
- Midkiff Rock, rock outcrop in Antarctica

== Legal case ==
- Hawaii Housing Authority v. Midkiff

== People with the surname ==
- Dale Midkiff (born 1959), American actor
- Dick Midkiff (1914–1956), American baseball player
- Ezra Midkiff (1882–1957), American baseball player
- Frank E. Midkiff (1887–1983), American educator and civic leader
- Walter Midkiff, AKA Dewey Martin (1940–2009), Canadian musician

== Pets ==
- Midkiff Seductive (born 1917), show dog
