= KCHS =

KCHS may refer to:

- Well known Catholic High School John F. Kennedy Catholic High School (Somers, New York)
- KCHS, the ICAO code for Charleston International Airport and Air Force Base, a joint civil-military airport.
- KCHS (AM), a radio station (1400 AM) licensed to Truth or Consequences, New Mexico, United States
- Kalamazoo Central High School in Kalamazoo, Michigan, United States
- King City High School in King City, California, United States
- Kirtland Central High School in Kirtland, New Mexico, United States
- Knight Commander of the Equestrian Order of the Holy Sepulchre (KCHS), a Catholic chivalric order
- Knoxville Catholic High School in Knoxville, Tennessee, United States
- Kearney Catholic High School in Kearney, Nebraska, United States
