= Truth or Consequences Hot Springs =

Thermal springs system

- Geronimo's Springs; Ojo Caliente de Las Palomas; Hay-Yo-Kay Hot Spring
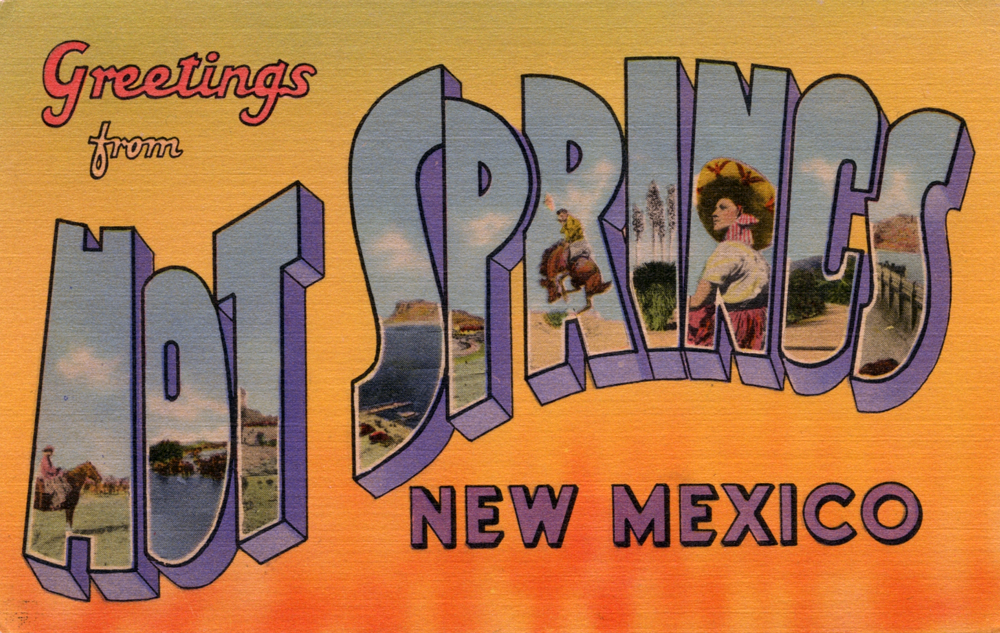

- Location within New Mexico
- Interactive map of Truth or Consequences Hot Springs
- Coordinates: 33°8′1″N 107°15′10″W
- Elevation: 4,245 feet (1,294 meters)
- Type: Geothermal
- Discharge: 2.5 million gallons per day (11.3 million liters)
- Temperature: 100 to 110 °F (38 to 43 °C)

Truth or Consequences Hot Springs is a thermal spring system located in the Hot Springs Artesian Basin area surrounding Truth or Consequences, New Mexico (formerly known as Hot Springs, New Mexico) in Sierra County.

== History ==
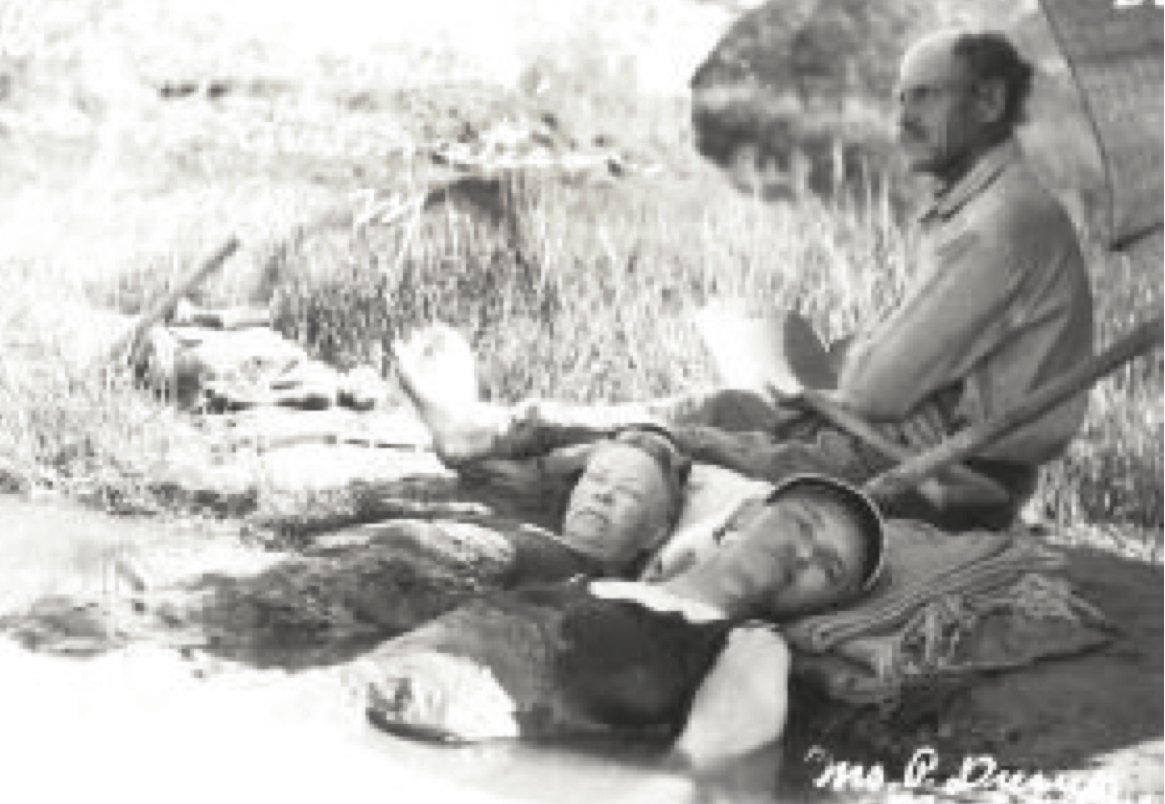
Oldest known photograph of the hot springs, 1860s or 70s (from Geronimo Springs Museum).

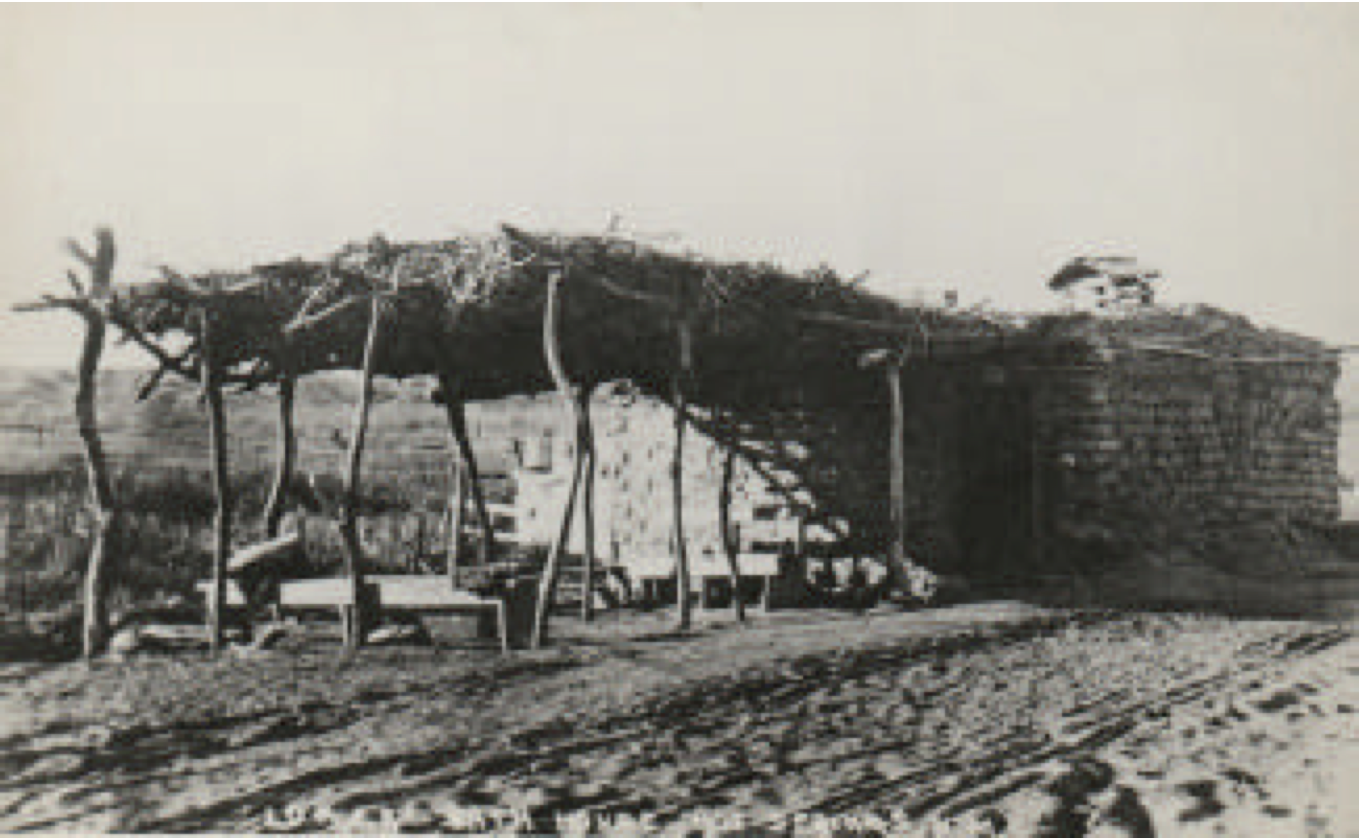
Geronimo Springs, one of the oldest bathhouse structures in 1882.

Local indigenous people used the hot springs before the arrival of outside settlers. The Chiricahua Apache people referred to these springs as "place to pray". Prior to 1910, the springs consisted of several undeveloped soaking pools and hot mud bogs. Like other hot springs, the local indigenous people considered these springs "neutral ground". Geronimo had spoken of spending an entire year there. Native American artifacts have been found and identified as being made by the earlier Mimbres culture. Later, the Spanish called the hot springs Ojo Caliente de Las Palomas (hot springs of the doves).

The first adobe bath house was built in the 1880s over what was called Geronimo's Spring. It was built for use by the cowboys of the John Cross Cattle Company. In the early 1900s, hot spring hotels began to be built in the area.

Government Springs was the first of the thermal springs in the system to be developed for tourists and health-seekers. There is a plaque commemorating the site west of the Geronimo Springs Museum.

In 1920, a bathhouse was built at Hay-Yo-Kay Hot Spring and became the oldest continuously operating in Truth or Consequences. The spring water emerges from an artesian source and no pumping is required to extract the water from this spring as it flows freely. There are now numerous soaking pools and tubs, and the temperatures range from 100 °F to 108 °F. The Fire Water Lodge motor court was also built in the 1920s featuring several soaking tubs.

During the 1920s, those who developed bathhouses often drilled artesian wells to tap into the hot water. By 1930, 20 thermal wells existed. Of these, 9 were used to bring hot water to apartment buildings, 8 were used for bathhouse establishments, one was used at a physician's office, and one was on private property. In the 1930s ten additional thermal facilities were developed. In areas where the aquifer was near the surface, some locals simply dug shallow holes in the earth to create sump wells. During this decade, hot-springs soaking was advertised as "beneficial to pulmonary and bronchial troubles" and affording "cure for rheumatism in all its forms, blood and skin disorders, ulcerated stomachs, genito-urinary and kindred diseases."

In the 1930s several more bathhouse establishments were built, including the Charles Motel and Spa established by Charles Lockhart; Indian Springs a small historic motel with hot spring spa; La Paloma Hot Springs (formerly Marshall Hot Springs) fed by a natural artesian source; Artesian Bath House sourced from an artesian well; and Cozy Court a motor court now called Pelican Spa.

A 1940 geological study of thermal waters in the Hot Springs Artesian Basin of Truth or Consequences identified 35 artesian wells and springs.

Prior to World War II, there were approximately 40 hot springs spa establishments in Truth or Consequences. Of the current hot springs establishments five draw their water from wells, and La Paloma Hot Springs & Spa (formerly Marshall Hot Springs), Riverbend Hot Springs, Indian Springs Bath House, Artesian Bath house and Hay-Yo-Kay Hot Springs obtain their water from free-flowing hot springs.

== Geothermal energy ==
The New Mexico Department of Energy, Minerals, and Natural Resources created two demonstration projects using geothermal energy in Truth or Consequences in the 1980s. The Carrie Tingley Hospital, for children with physical disabilities, used state funding to create a physical-therapy program in Truth or Consequences, but has since moved to Albuquerque. The local Senior Citizen's Center benefits from a geothermal space heating system.

== Water profile ==
The combined flow of the hot springs complex is estimated at 99 liters (3.5 ft^{3}) per second; the spring system produces 2.5 million gallons of hot mineral water per day, comprising the "largest mineral water aquifer in the Southwestern United States". Water temperatures in the soaking pools range from 100 to 110 °F (38 to 43 °C). The water is heavily mineralized with chloride and sulfates but no sulphur. Trace minerals include: iodide, gold, lithium, magnesium sulfates, potassium chlorate, potassium permanganate, silver, and sodium fluoride.

== Location ==
The hot springs system is located in the town of Truth or Consequences at 33.135 N 107.254 W.

== Gallery ==
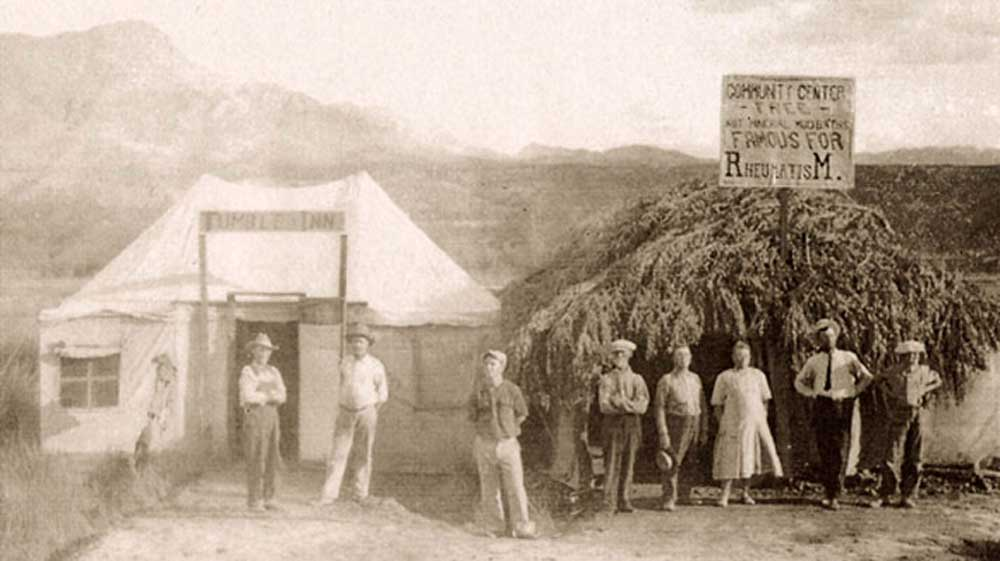
Tumble Inn, 1890s

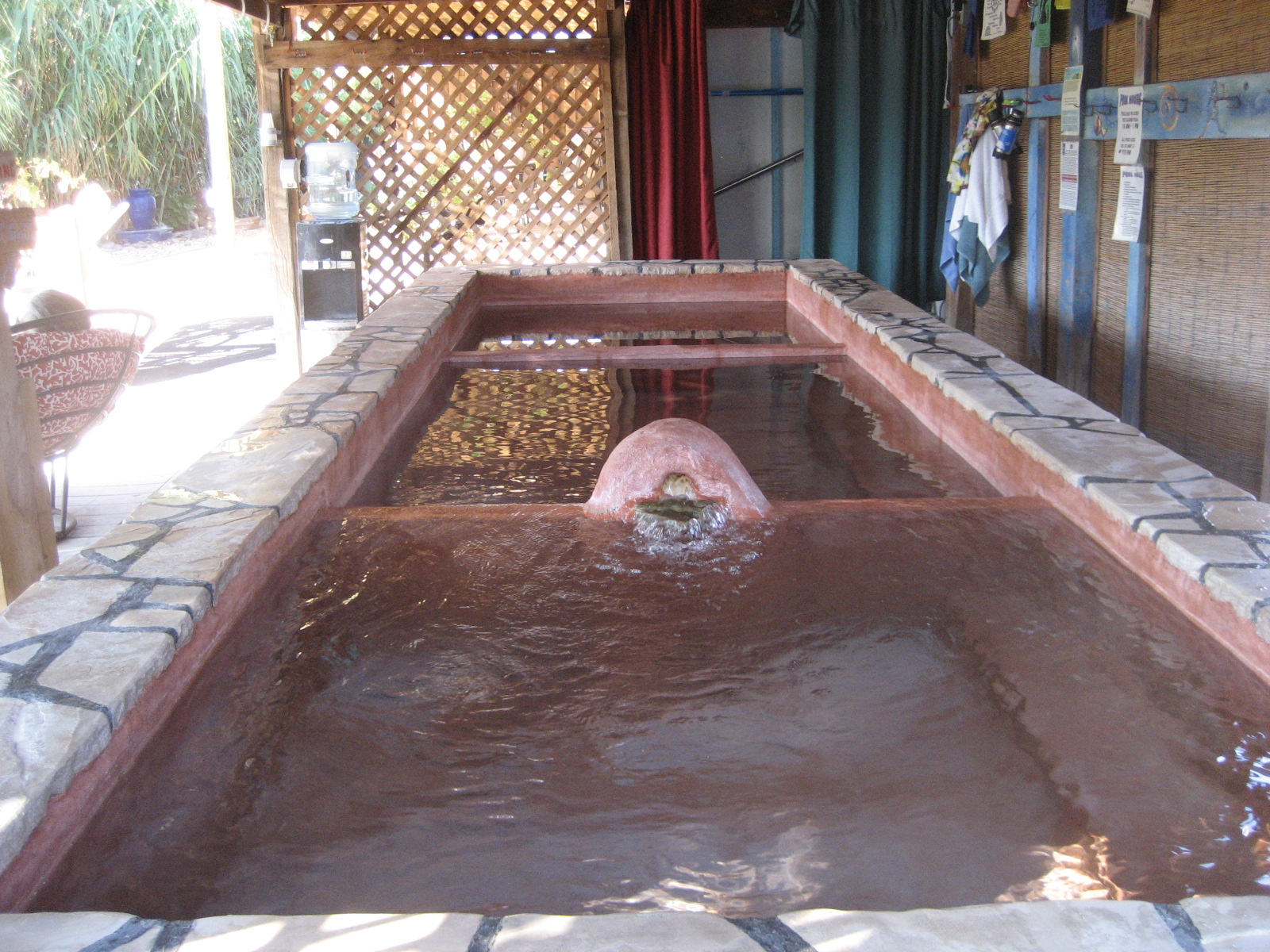
Developed hot springs soaking pool.

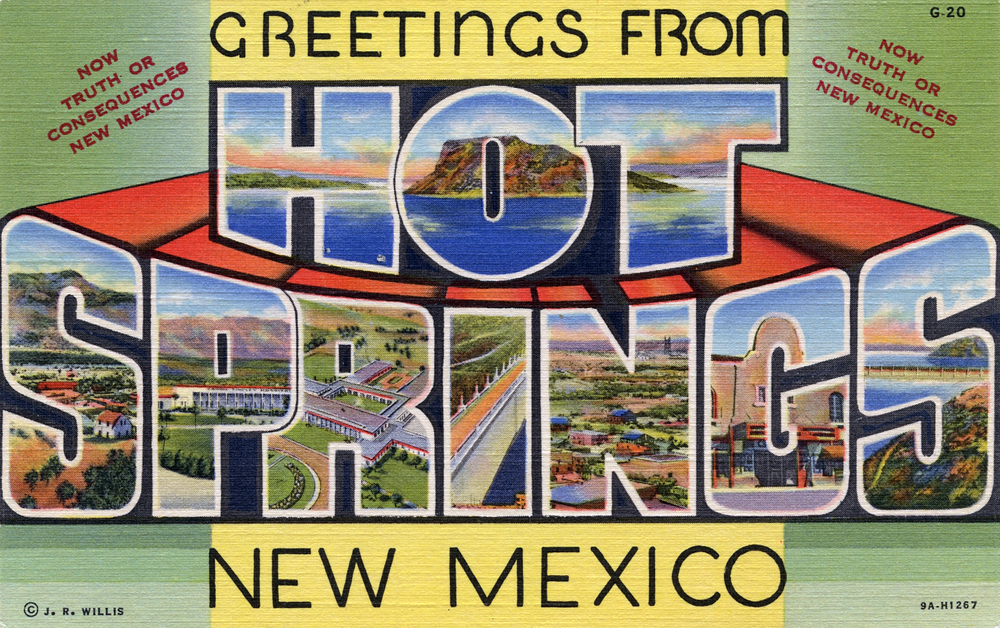
Greetings from Hot Springs, New Mexico postcard.

== See also ==
Hot Springs Bathhouse and Commercial Historic District in Truth or Consequences
