= Pantel =

Pantel may refer to:

- Panamericana Televisión, a Peruvian television network
- Guylène Pantel (born 1963), French politician
- Sylvia Pantel (born 1961), German politician
- Thierry Pantel (born 1964), French former long-distance runner
