= Delmas Municipal Aerodrome =

Delmas Municipal Aerodrome Delmas Munisipale Vliegveld
- IATA: none; ICAO: none

Summary
- Airport type: Defunct
- Location: North of Delmas in Mpumalanga province
- Opened: April 1983
- Closed: 2008
- Coordinates: 26°07′23″S 28°41′21″E

Map
- Location within South Africa

Delmas Municipal Aerodrome also known as Delmas Airfield, was an airfield located north of Delmas in Mpumalanga province, South Africa. It was opened in April 1983 for circuit training, and closed around the 2000s. It was rezoned in 2008 and was subsequently redeveloped.

== History ==
On 23 November 1982, the Delmas Flying Club was issued Flying Training Air Service License F291. It had a Piper PA-28-140 (registered ZS-FDN) and a Piper PA-28-180 (registered ZS-CMV). On 31 March 1982, the Town Council of Delmas submitted an application to establish a new township called Delmas Extension 14. It extended north from Delmas Extension 6, and proposed a commercial and industrial area, and a new aerodrome. In February 1983, a Piper Cherokee 180 (registered ZS-CMV) was added to the flying club's inventory. In April 1983, the Aero Club of South Africa officially opened the new Delmas Municipal Aerodrome, incorporated as the finale of the Mid-Highveld Show. The aerodrome had fuel available and invited multiple flying clubs. In December 1984, Delmas Flying Club applied to renew its license. On 26 August 1987, the plan was approved and development of the surrounding township began.

Throughout operation, Delmas Municipal Aerodrome had served Delmas' farming and mining operations. It had two dirt strips, one of which was light gravelled and measured 980 metres long, the other measuring 1,070 metres long. Both runways used white fringe markings. Additionally, the airport housed the Delmas Flying Club, used for circuit training handling aircraft such as the Junkers Ju 52.

=== Closure ===
By the 2000s, Delmas Municipal Aerodrome was disused and subdivided into multiple lots, including a portion of Erf 1202, portion of Cessnas Avenue, Erven 1131-1141, and Erven 1145-1154 within Delmas Extension 14. Streets were also named after the airfield; Dakota Avenue, Cessna Avenue, and Spitfire Avenue. On 28 March 2008, the landowner of the airfield rezoned the land from "Special" for airfield use to industrial. By 2013, the runways had completely fallen into disuse.
