= United Nations Security Council Resolution 956 =

UN Security Council Resolution 956
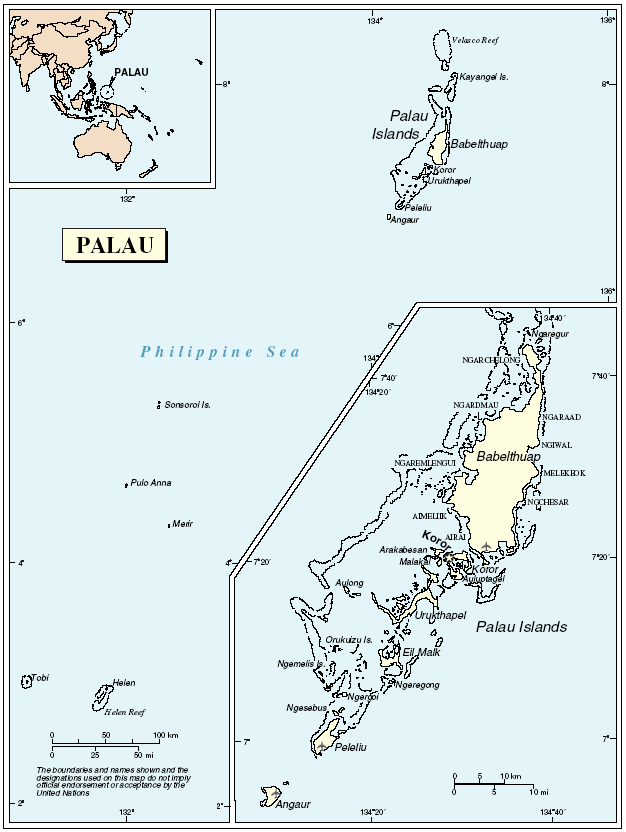
- Palau
- Date: 10 November 1994
- Meeting no.: 3,455
- Code: S/RES/956 (Document)
- Subject: Palau
- Voting summary: 15 voted for; None voted against; None abstained
- Result: Adopted

Security Council composition
- Permanent members: China; France; Russia; United Kingdom; United States
- Non-permanent members: Argentina; Brazil; Czech Republic; Djibouti; New Zealand; Nigeria; Oman; Pakistan; Rwanda; Spain

United Nations Security Council resolution 956, adopted unanimously on 10 November 1994, after recalling Chapter XII of the United Nations Charter which established the United Nations Trusteeship system and Resolution 21 (1947) which approved the Trusteeship Territory of the Japanese Mandated Islands (since known as the Trust Territory of the Pacific Islands), the Council determined that, in the light of entry into force of a new status agreement for the Republic of Palau, the objectives of the Trusteeship Agreement had been completed and therefore ended the status of Palau as a Trust Territory.

The Council noted that the United States was the Administering Authority of the Trust Territory and was satisfied that the people of Palau had freely exercised their right to self-determination in approving the new status agreement. Approval for Palau to join the United Nations was given in Resolution 963.

== See also ==
- Compact of Free Association
- List of United Nations Security Council Resolutions 901 to 1000 (1994–1995)
- United Nations Security Council Resolution 683
- United Nations Trust Territories
