= Geronimo Springs Museum =

Regional museum in New Mexico

Coordinates: 33°07′48″N 107°15′10″W

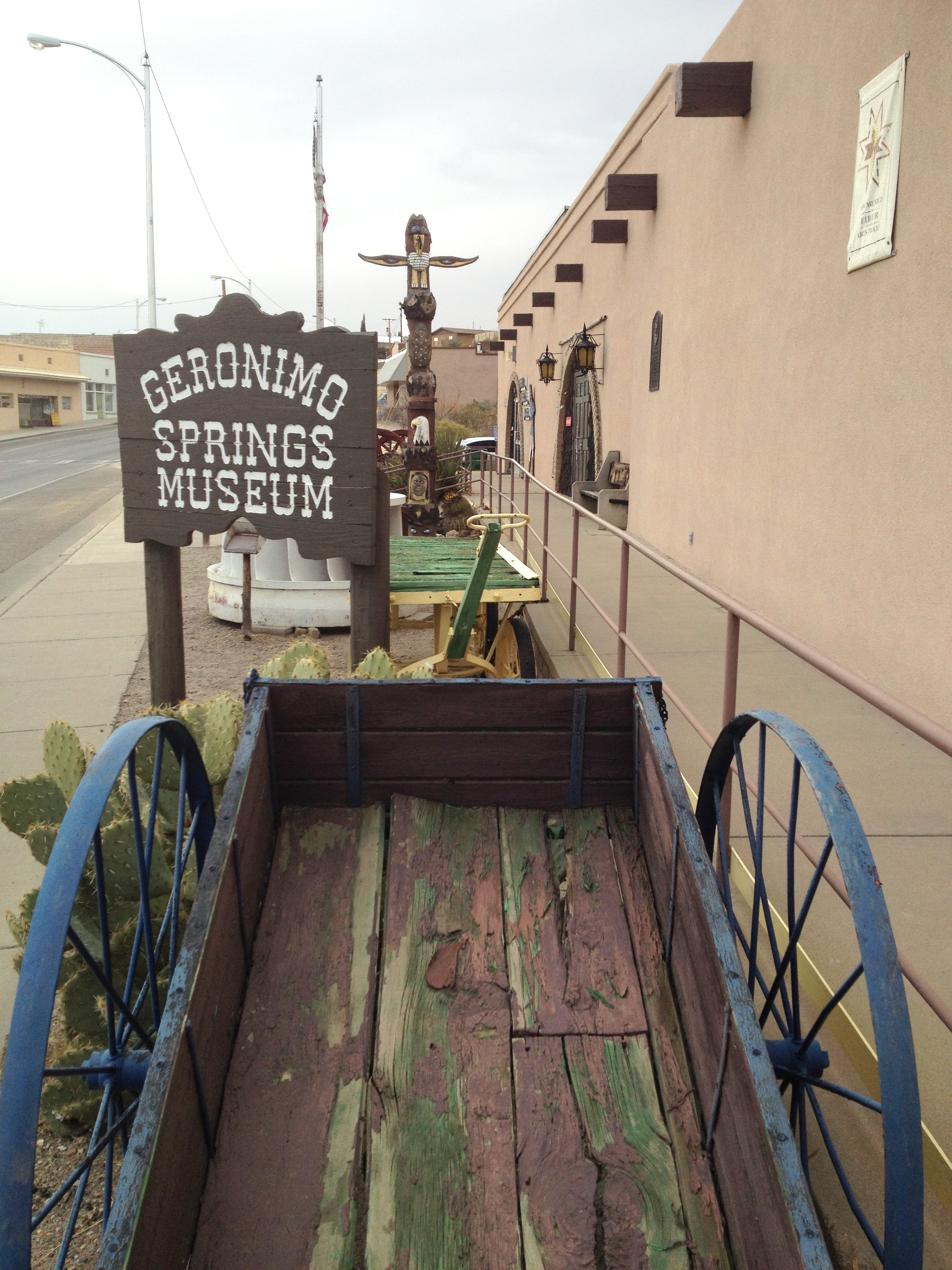
Geronimo Springs Museum, Truth or Consequences, NM

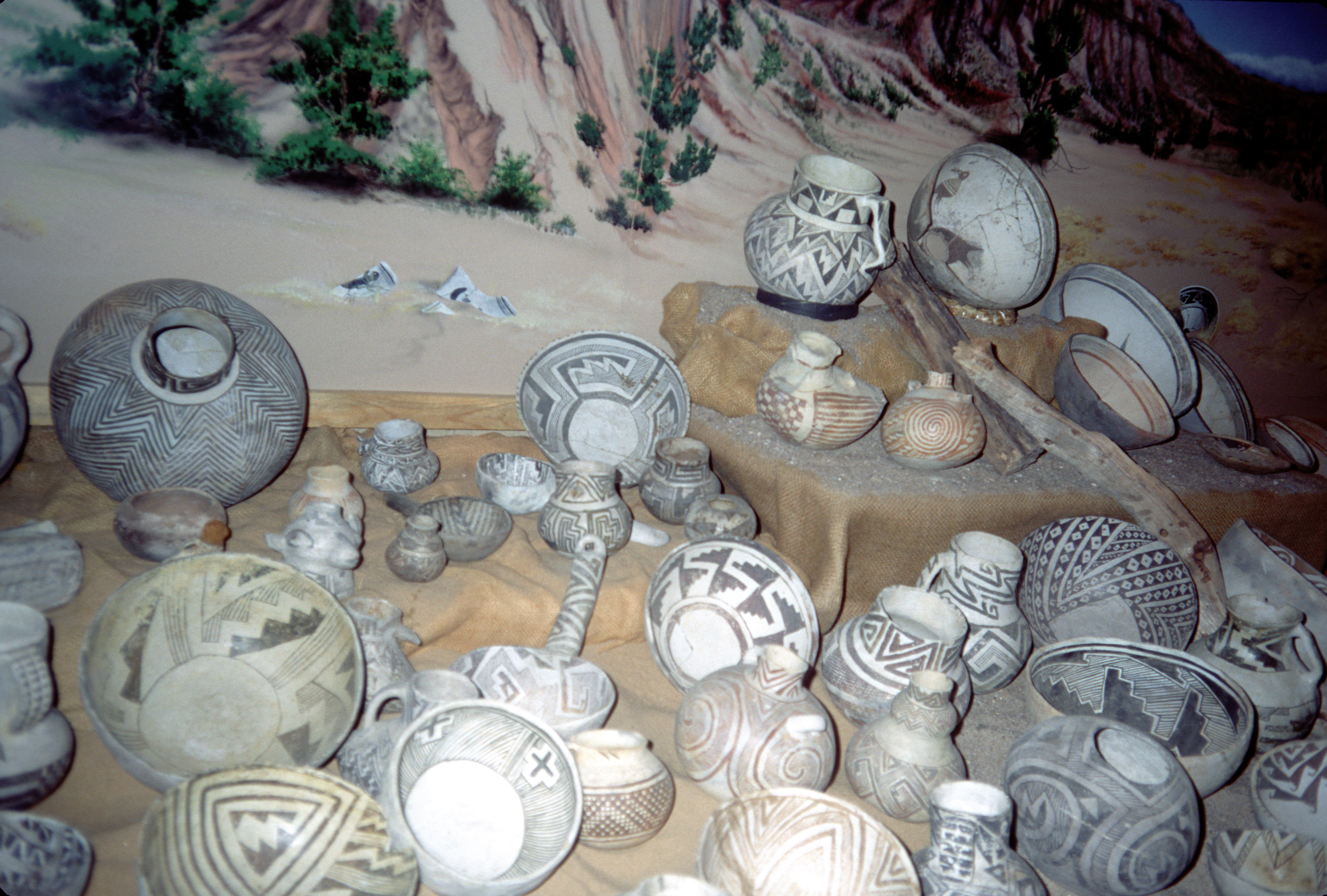
Detail of Mimbres pottery exhibit at the museum

The Geronimo Springs Museum is a small regional museum located in Truth or Consequences, New Mexico, United States. It is named after Geronimo Hot Springs, one of numerous hot springs in the Hot Springs Artesian Basin. The springs were named after the Chiricahua Apache leader Geronimo (1829–1909) from the Bedonkohe band of the Apache people.

The museum exhibits feature collections of fossils, photographs, artifacts and pottery (mainly Mimbres and Tularosa from 200 AD to 1350 AD), that present a comprehensive historical view of Sierra County and its inhabitants over time. A historical miner's cabin is on the premises that was moved from the Black Range mountains nearby. In addition to the collection of Mimbres pottery, other historical objects include Apache artifacts, Hispanic artifacts, military objects, and mining and ranching exhibits. The museum also contains a display about Ralph Edwards, the host of the radio and television game show, Truth or Consequences, for which the town was renamed (formerly Hot Springs, New Mexico). Edwards relocated to the town in 1950 to host the show locally. The museum was co-founded in 1972 by Ann Welborn who remembers meeting several movie stars who were on the show.

In 2021, a representation of Geronimo was stolen from the museum facade.
