= Hot Springs Bathhouse and Commercial Historic District in Truth or Consequences =

Historic district in New Mexico, United States

- U.S. National Register of Historic Places
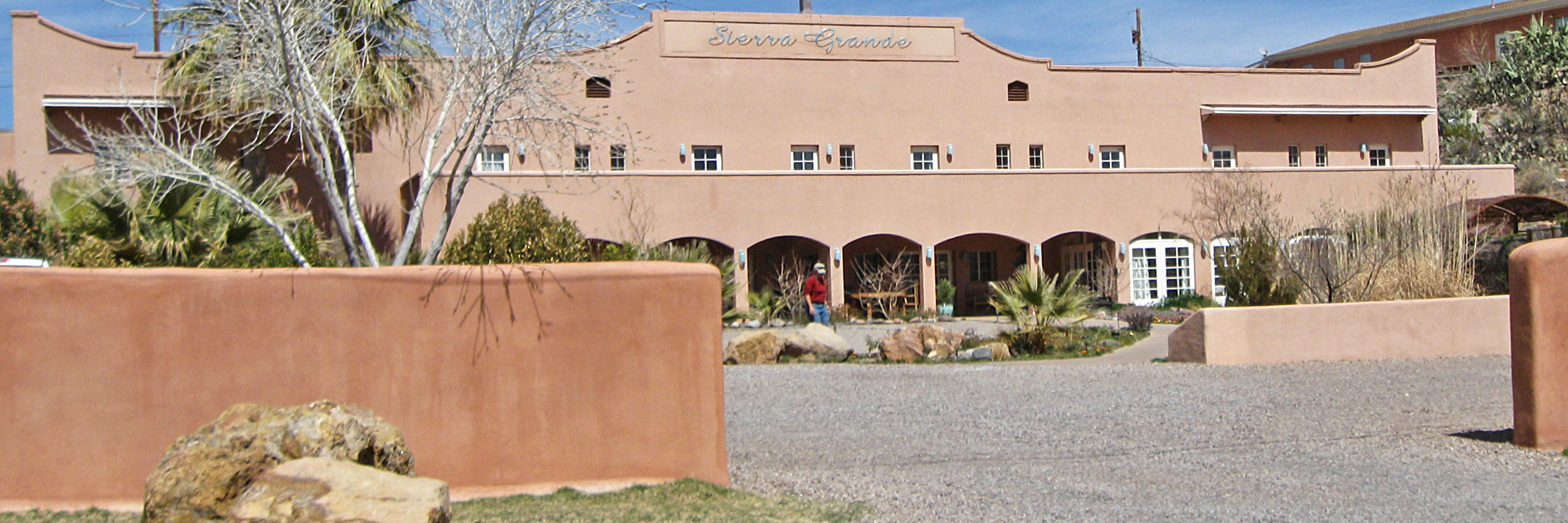

- Location within New Mexico Location within the United States
- Location: Roughly bounded by Post, Van Patten, Pershing and Main Sts., Truth or Consequences, New Mexico Roughly bounded by Post, Van Patten, Pershing, and Main Sts. 33°07′40″N 107°15′17″W
- Area: 56 acres (23 ha)
- Built: 1916
- Architectural style: Pueblo, Moderne
- NRHP reference No.: 05000409
- Added to NRHP: May 10, 2005

The Hot Springs Bathhouse and Commercial Historic District in Truth or Consequences in Truth or Consequences, New Mexico is a 56 acres (23 ha) historic district which was listed on the National Register of Historic Places in 2005.

It is roughly bounded by Post, Van Patten, Pershing and Main Streets. The district encompasses "much of the city's historic downtown and nearby mineral baths and apartments that served visitors who came to the health resort community between 1916 and 1950 when it was known as Hot Springs. The district also encompasses the locations of the approximately 35 artesian wells, springs and sumps identified in a 1940 geological study of the thermal waters of the Hot Springs Artesian Basin. Included within the district are 125 contributing properties and 87 noncontributing properties."

== Hot springs area history ==
There is significant evidence of Native American use of the hot springs area. Limestone rock outcrops have deep mortar holes that have been ground into the rocks near the lining of the pond located at Ralph Edwards Park. The NRHP notes that these "serve as reminders that Native Americans were familiar with the hot springs artesian basin in pre-historic times." On the western side of the Rio Grande, mortar holes can be found that are several inches deep formed by the use of grinding pestles. These sites are thought to be associated with the Mimbres people of the Mogollon culture.

Before 1907, the area was a bosque with tule swamps present; the only hot springs visible from the road were Geronimo's Springs (formerly named Government Springs). After the river was realigned in a channel, more of the hot springs became visible, resulting in their development. By 1919, the thermal waters flowed through Hot Springs Ditch "using the waters of the bathhouses, sewers, and hot springs" for irrigation of lands southwest of the ditch (Hiltscher 1919). In the 1930s, the ditch was channeled in a WPA project into a culvert by way of Marr Street drawing thermal waters from the Indian Wells, Hay-Yo-Kay and Marshall Bathhouses and eventually discharging into the Rio Grande.

== See also ==
- Truth or Consequences Hot Springs
