= Truth or Consequences, New Mexico =

Truth or Consequences, New Mexico Hot Springs
- City
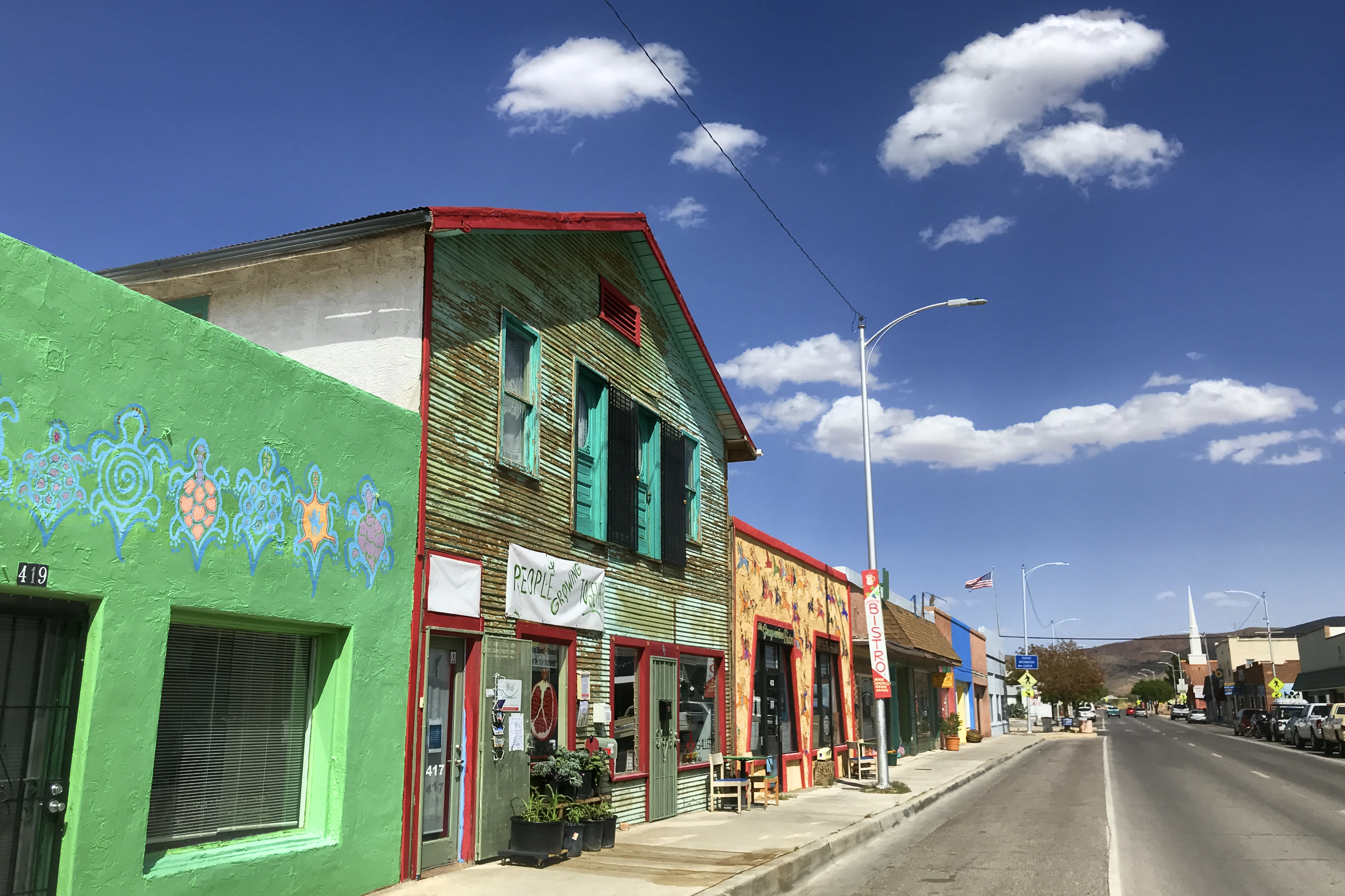
- Broadway, Truth or Consequences

- Seal
- Nickname: "T or C"
- Location of Truth or Consequences, New Mexico

- Location in the United States
- Coordinates: 33°08′07″N 107°15′10″W
- Country: United States
- State: New Mexico
- County: Sierra
- Named for: Truth or Consequences radio show

Government
  - Mayor: Rolf Hechler

Area
  - Total: 28.11 sq mi (72.81 km^{2})
  - Land: 28.00 sq mi (72.51 km^{2})
  - Water: 0.12 sq mi (0.30 km^{2})
- Elevation: 4,311 ft (1,314 m)

Population (2020)
  - Total: 6,052
  - Density: 216.2/sq mi (83.47/km^{2})
- Time zone: UTC−07:00 (Mountain (MST))
  - Summer (DST): UTC−06:00 (MDT)
- ZIP Code: 87901
- Area code: 575
- FIPS code: 35-79840
- GNIS feature ID: 2412102
- Website: www.torcnm.gov

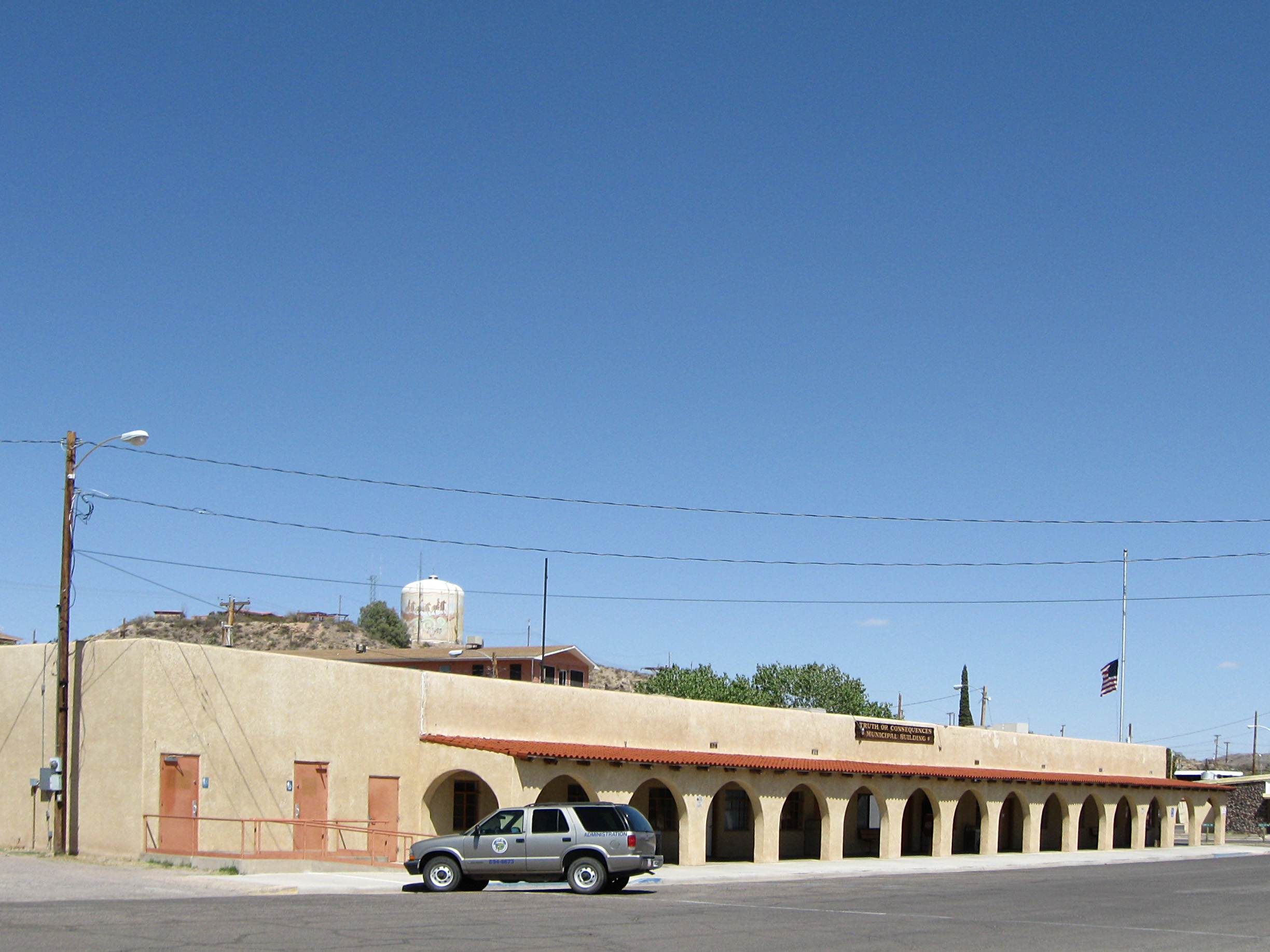
Truth or Consequences New Mexico City Hall, 2009

Truth or Consequences (commonly T or C; founded as Hot Springs) is a city in the U.S. state of New Mexico, and the county seat of Sierra County. In 2020, the population was 6,052. The city is historically defined and economically shaped by local geothermal hot springs. It has frequently been noted on lists of unusual place names for having chosen to rename itself in March 1950 after the Truth or Consequences radio show. The name is often hyphenated (Truth-or-Consequences, T-or-C) for clarity, though the formal name contains no punctuation.

== History ==
The area is noted for its hot springs, and the first public bath in the area was built at John Cross Ranch over Geronimo Springs in the late 19th century. The hot springs are part of the Hot Springs Artesian Basin. However, major settlement did not begin until the construction of Elephant Butte Dam and its reservoir in 1912; the dam was completed in 1916. It was a part of the Rio Grande Project, an early large-scale irrigation effort authorized under the Newlands Reclamation Act of 1902. In 1916, the town was incorporated as Hot Springs. It became the Sierra County seat in 1937. By the late 1930s, Hot Springs was filled with 40 natural hot springs spas — one per every 75 residents at the time — though primarily catering to visitors.

=== Name ===
The city changed its name from Hot Springs to Truth or Consequences as the result of a contest on the radio program Truth or Consequences. In March 1950, Ralph Edwards, the host of the NBC Radio quiz show, announced that he would air the program on its 10th anniversary from the first town that renamed itself after the show. In a special election on March 31, 1950, residents of Hot Springs voted 1294 to 295 to change the town’s name to Truth or Consequences, and the program was broadcast there the following evening. Edwards visited the town during the first weekend of May for the next 50 years. This event became known as Fiesta and eventually included a beauty contest, a parade, and a stage show. The city still celebrates Fiesta each year during the first weekend of May. The parade generally features local dignitaries, last year's Miss Fiesta pageant queen, and the winner of Hatch Chile Queen pageant. Fiesta also features a dance in Ralph Edwards Park.

== Hot springs ==
Several hot springs are located in Truth or Consequences. The combined flow of the hot springs complex in Truth or Consequences is estimated at 99 liters (26 U.S. gal) per second. The geothermal system is fed by groundwater that circulates to depths of up to 4 kilometres (2.5 mi) in the fractured crystalline basement, where it is heated by a geothermal gradient of approximately 40 °C per kilometer before rising rapidly to the surface through permeable fault zones. Natural discharge is estimated at approximately 2.1 million gallons per day, sourced primarily from recharge zones in the Sierra Cuchillo Mountains and San Mateo Mountains.

"Dad Creeley's" mineral baths in Hot Springs, New Mexico, 1927

Before World War II, there were about 40 hot springs spas in Truth or Consequences. By 2008, the Hot Springs Association in Truth or Consequences had 10 spa facilities as members. Five of those obtained their water from wells, and La Paloma Hot Springs & Spa (formerly Marshall Hot Springs), Riverbend Hot Springs, Indian Springs Bath House, Artesian Bath House, and Hay-Yo-Kay Hot Springs are from free-flowing hot springs.

Appropriation of geothermal water in the Truth or Consequences Hot Springs District has grown from roughly 130,000 gallons per day in 1941 to about 1.5 million gallons per day by 2013, though actual usage remains uncertain due to limited pumping data. Over the same period, water-table elevations have declined by between one and two feet and artesian flow from deep wells has effectively ceased, indicating reduced pressure in the underlying aquifer. Geothermal discharge remains similar to historic estimates, about 2.1 million gallons per day, but increased withdrawals pose potential sustainability concerns, including the risk of drawing in cooler Rio Grande water if pumping exceeds natural discharge. While temperatures in some wells have declined slightly since the 1939 baseline, this may reflect the shallower depths of current wells rather than a systemic temperature drop.

The New Mexico Department of Energy, Minerals, and Natural Resources created two demonstration projects using geothermal energy in Truth or Consequences in the 1980s. The Carrie Tingley Hospital, for children with physical disabilities, used state funding to create a physical-therapy program in Truth or Consequences, but has since moved to Albuquerque. The local Senior Citizen's Center benefits from a geothermal space heating system.

== Geography ==
According to the United States Census Bureau, the city has a total area of 12.8 square miles (33 km^{2}), of which 12.6 square miles (33 km^{2}) is land and 0.1 square miles (0.26 km^{2}) (0.86%) is water.

The city is located on the Rio Grande, near Elephant Butte Reservoir. The city is served by the Truth or Consequences Municipal Airport, Interstate 25, I-25 Business, New Mexico State Road 51 (NM 51), NM 181 and NM 187.

=== Climate ===
Truth or Consequences has a cool desert climate (Köppen BWk) with three main seasons. The summer season from April to June is dry and generally hot with large diurnal temperature variation, giving way in July to the monsoon season, which remains very hot but is much more humid as rainfall from thunderstorms is frequent. The winter season from October to March has mild and sunny days and cold to frigid nights, with very occasional downpours from extratropical cyclones.

On average over the year, 88.6 days top 90 °F (32.2 °C), 20.3 days top 100 °F or 37.8 °C, and 68.8 nights fall below 32 °F or 0 °C. The record low is −7 °F (−21.7 °C) on January 11, 1962. The lowest maximum temperature on record has been 15 °F (−9.4 °C) in January 1948, but during most years, every single day will top freezing, and on average, only 20.2 days fail to top 50 °F (10 °C). The hottest temperature on record is 111 °F (43.9 °C) on June 26–27, 1994, though minimums virtually never stay above 75 °F (23.9 °C) due to the low humidity and hot sun.

Precipitation is generally scarce apart from monsoonal storms. The wettest month on record has been July 2008 with 6.38 inches (162.1 mm), but totals above 4.00 inches (101.6 mm) are confined to the monsoon season apart from an anomaly in December 1991 when three major subtropical cyclones brought 4.70 inches (119.4 mm). Also, 1991 was the wettest full calendar year with 16.70 inches (424.2 mm). Snowfall is rare, with a median of zero and a mean of 0.9 inches (2.3 cm); the heaviest daily snowfall recorded in Truth or Consequences is the 14.0 inches (36 cm) that fell during a harsh cold spell on December 9, 1960.

Climate data for Truth or Consequences, New Mexico (Elephant Butte Dam), 1991–2020 normals, extremes 1908–present
Month	Jan	Feb	Mar	Apr	May	Jun	Jul	Aug	Sep	Oct	Nov	Dec	Year
Record high °F (°C)	78 (26)	83 (28)	89 (32)	96 (36)	103 (39)	111 (44)	110 (43)	106 (41)	102 (39)	98 (37)	88 (31)	78 (26)	111 (44)
Mean maximum °F (°C)	68.4 (20.2)	74.4 (23.6)	81.9 (27.7)	88.8 (31.6)	95.9 (35.5)	104.3 (40.2)	103.8 (39.9)	100.6 (38.1)	95.8 (35.4)	89.3 (31.8)	77.9 (25.5)	68.1 (20.1)	105.7 (40.9)
Mean daily maximum °F (°C)	56.5 (13.6)	62.0 (16.7)	69.4 (20.8)	77.5 (25.3)	86.2 (30.1)	95.9 (35.5)	95.7 (35.4)	93.3 (34.1)	87.6 (30.9)	78.0 (25.6)	65.6 (18.7)	55.6 (13.1)	76.9 (25.0)
Daily mean °F (°C)	43.3 (6.3)	48.1 (8.9)	54.9 (12.7)	63.0 (17.2)	71.9 (22.2)	81.7 (27.6)	82.9 (28.3)	80.9 (27.2)	74.7 (23.7)	64.1 (17.8)	52.0 (11.1)	43.0 (6.1)	63.4 (17.4)
Mean daily minimum °F (°C)	30.0 (−1.1)	34.1 (1.2)	40.3 (4.6)	48.5 (9.2)	57.6 (14.2)	67.4 (19.7)	70.2 (21.2)	68.6 (20.3)	61.9 (16.6)	50.3 (10.2)	38.4 (3.6)	30.4 (−0.9)	49.8 (9.9)
Mean minimum °F (°C)	20.2 (−6.6)	23.0 (−5.0)	27.9 (−2.3)	36.3 (2.4)	44.1 (6.7)	57.1 (13.9)	63.3 (17.4)	62.1 (16.7)	52.8 (11.6)	37.1 (2.8)	25.9 (−3.4)	18.7 (−7.4)	16.1 (−8.8)
Record low °F (°C)	−7 (−22)	−2 (−19)	14 (−10)	23 (−5)	33 (1)	39 (4)	51 (11)	51 (11)	37 (3)	22 (−6)	9 (−13)	−3 (−19)	−7 (−22)
Average precipitation inches (mm)	0.42 (11)	0.33 (8.4)	0.26 (6.6)	0.28 (7.1)	0.43 (11)	0.48 (12)	2.17 (55)	1.81 (46)	1.58 (40)	0.87 (22)	0.62 (16)	0.64 (16)	9.89 (251.1)
Average snowfall inches (cm)	0.2 (0.51)	0.3 (0.76)	0.0 (0.0)	0.0 (0.0)	0.0 (0.0)	0.0 (0.0)	0.0 (0.0)	0.0 (0.0)	0.0 (0.0)	0.1 (0.25)	0.0 (0.0)	0.3 (0.76)	0.9 (2.28)
Average precipitation days (≥ 0.01 in)	3.0	2.2	2.3	1.3	2.4	2.7	7.7	8.2	5.7	4.2	2.6	3.1	45.4
Average snowy days (≥ 0.1 in)	0.2	0.1	0.0	0.0	0.0	0.0	0.0	0.0	0.0	0.1	0.0	0.1	0.5
Source 1: NOAA
Source 2: National Weather Service

== Demographics ==
Historical population
Census	Pop.	Note	%±
1920	455		—
1930	1,336		193.6%
1940	2,940		120.1%
1950	4,700		59.9%
1960	5,000		6.4%
1970	4,656		−6.9%
1980	5,219		12.1%
1990	6,221		19.2%
2000	7,289		17.2%
2010	6,475		−11.2%
2020	6,052		−6.5%
U.S. Decennial Census

=== Racial and ethnic composition ===
Truth or Consequences city, New Mexico – Racial composition Note: the US Census treats Hispanic/Latino as an ethnic category. This table excludes Latinos from the racial categories and assigns them to a separate category. Hispanics/Latinos may be of any race.
Race (NH = Non-Hispanic)	2020	2010	2000	1990	1980
White alone (NH)	63.3% (3,829)	67.8% (4,392)	69.1% (5,037)	75% (4,664)	74.6% (3,894)
Black alone (NH)	0.8% (51)	0.6% (37)	0.5% (37)	0.5% (28)	0.2% (10)
American Indian alone (NH)	1% (63)	1.1% (74)	1.4% (101)	0.8% (52)	0.7% (36)
Asian alone (NH)	1.6% (94)	0.5% (32)	0.2% (12)	0.1% (6)	0.1% (7)
Pacific Islander alone (NH)	0% (0)	0% (1)	0% (1)		
Other race alone (NH)	0.3% (17)	0.1% (5)	0.2% (11)	0.1% (6)	0.3% (14)
Multiracial (NH)	3.7% (226)	1.7% (110)	1.3% (96)	—	—
Hispanic/Latino (any race)	29.3% (1,772)	28.2% (1,824)	27.4% (1,994)	23.5% (1,465)	24.1% (1,258)

=== 2020 census ===
As of the 2020 census, Truth or Consequences had a population of 6,052.

The median age was 55.0 years. 16.5% of residents were under the age of 18, and 32.9% were 65 years of age or older. For every 100 females, there were 98.0 males, and for every 100 females age 18 and over, there were 94.3 males age 18 and over.

93.7% of residents lived in urban areas, while 6.3% lived in rural areas.

There were 3,067 households, of which 17.5% had children under the age of 18 living in them. Of all households, 25.8% were married-couple households, 29.2% were households with a male householder and no spouse or partner present, and 36.6% were households with a female householder and no spouse or partner present. About 48.7% of all households were made up of individuals, and 27.6% had someone living alone who was 65 years of age or older.

There were 3,985 housing units, of which 23.0% were vacant. The homeowner vacancy rate was 2.8%, and the rental vacancy rate was 16.3%.

==== Comparison with 2000 census ====
As of the 2000 census, there were 7,289 people, 3,450 households, and 1,859 families residing in the city. The population density was 576.0 inhabitants per square mile (222.4/km^{2}). There were 4,445 housing units at an average density of 351.3 per square mile (135.6/km^{2}). The racial makeup of the city was 85.35% White, 0.63% African American, 1.77% Native American, 0.16% Asian, 0.05% Pacific Islander, 9.36% from other races, and 2.68% from two or more races. Hispanic or Latino residents of any race were 27.4% of the population.

There were 3,450 households, out of which 20.2% had children under the age of 18 living with them, 40.5% were married couples living together, 10.3% had a female householder with no husband present, and 46.1% were non-families. 41.2% of all households were made up of individuals, and 22.1% had someone living alone who was 65 years of age or older. The average household size was 2.04, and the average family size was 2.75.

In the city, 20.2% of the population was under the age of 18, 5.7% was from 18 to 24, 20.1% from 25 to 44, 24.6% from 45 to 64, and 29.3% was 65 years of age or older. The median age was 48 years. For every 100 females, there were 96.8 males. For every 100 females age 18 and over, there were 92.4 males.

The median income for a household in the city was $20,986, and the median income for a family was $28,750. Men had a median income of $23,214 versus $18,207 for women. The per capita income for the city was $14,415. About 15.6% of families and 23.2% of the population were below the poverty line, including 33.3% of those under age 18 and 18.1% of those age 65 or over.

== Education ==
Truth or Consequences Schools is the school district for all of the county.

Sierra Elementary Complex and Truth or Consequences Elementary School are elementary schools in the community. Truth or Consequences Middle School and Hot Springs High School, both in Truth or Consequences, are the district's secondary schools.

== Arts and culture ==
The Sierra County Arts Council oversees Truth or Consequences and supports cultural and artistic diversity for county residents. It presents public lectures, sponsors events and murals as well as miscellaneous performances.

Notable artists who live and work in Truth or Consequences include the painter Delmas Howe, who was called, in 1990, by the art writer Edward Lucie-Smith "probably America's best known 'gay artist'—in the sense that he is the best-known artist who puts homosexual feeling at the very center of his work."

Truth or Consequences has several art galleries, including The Center Gallery, Snakestone Studios, Truth or Consequences Contemporary, Artist Abbey, Xochi's Bookstore and Gallery, among others. Although located over 200 miles from Santa Fe, the town is considered an art-centric hub in New Mexico, and includes a periodic "Art Hop" built around Main Street and the historical hot springs district.

Truth or Consequences is the home of Mary's Little Remnant, a Catholic Sedevacantist group.

== Media ==
Truth or Consequences is primarily served by GPK Media LLC, a local company that provides news and community information for Sierra County. The company publishes the Sierra County Sentinel, the county’s primary newspaper, and it owns KCHS 1400 AM, a local radio station.

Truth or Consequences has increasingly attracted film and television productions as part of New Mexico’s statewide film industry expansion. The city and surrounding Sierra County have benefited from the state’s film production tax credit, which provides additional incentives for projects outside major urban centers. Recent productions have brought employment opportunities and economic activity to the area, including the use of local businesses and services. Productions that have filmed in the city of Truth or Consequences include: Eddington (2025), Being Rose (2017), and Mad Love (1995).

The city's 1950 name change was sold by some town leaders as a way to bring publicity, tourists, jobs, and industry to the area. Commentators have since noted that publicity without substantive change was the result, with the majority of the town’s appearances in wider media being inclusion as a setting with an interesting name. An example of media that shows this effect is the 1997 American neo-noir film Truth or Consequences, N.M. directed by and starring Kiefer Sutherland, Vincent Gallo, and Rod Steiger.

Television station KKAB channel 12 is licensed to Truth or Consequences. It signed on in September 2025, making it the first full-powered television service in the area.

== See also ==
- Hot Springs Bathhouse and Commercial Historic District in Truth or Consequences
- Geronimo Springs Museum
- List of municipalities in New Mexico
