= Edward E. Johnston =

American businessman and politician

Edward Johnson
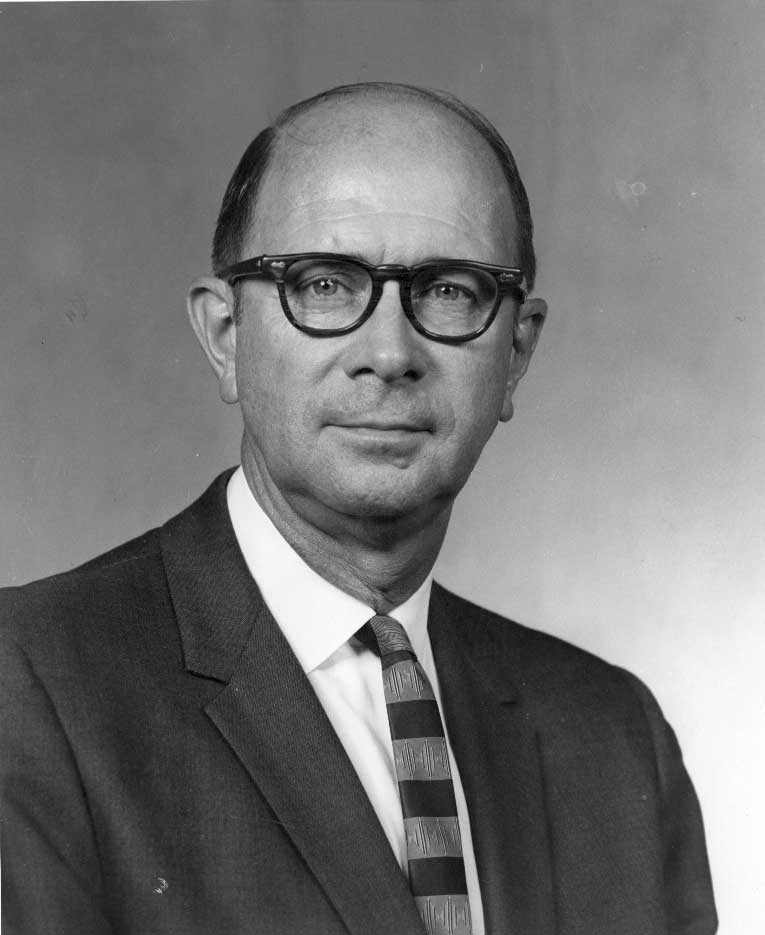
- Born: Edward Elliott Johnson; January 3, 1918; Jacksonville, Illinois, United States
- Died: February 18, 2011 (aged 93); Rohnert Park, California, United States
- Occupation: Politician
- Known for: Secretary of the Hawaii Territory; High Commissioner of the Trust Territory of the Pacific Islands

Edward Elliott Johnston (January 3, 1918 – February 18, 2011) was an American businessman and politician.

Raised in Jacksonville, Illinois, Johnston graduated from Illinois College and was a radio broadcaster. He served in the United States Air Force during World War II and the Korean War. He moved to Hawaii Territory and was in the insurance and tourism business. He was also involved with the Republican Party in Hawaii. President Dwight Eisenhower appointed Johnston secretary of the Hawaii Territory. In 1969, President Richard Nixon appointed Johnston High Commissioner of the Trust Territory of the Pacific Islands and served until 1976. He died in Rohnert Park, California.
