= Briergate Bright Beauty =

Best In Show Winner

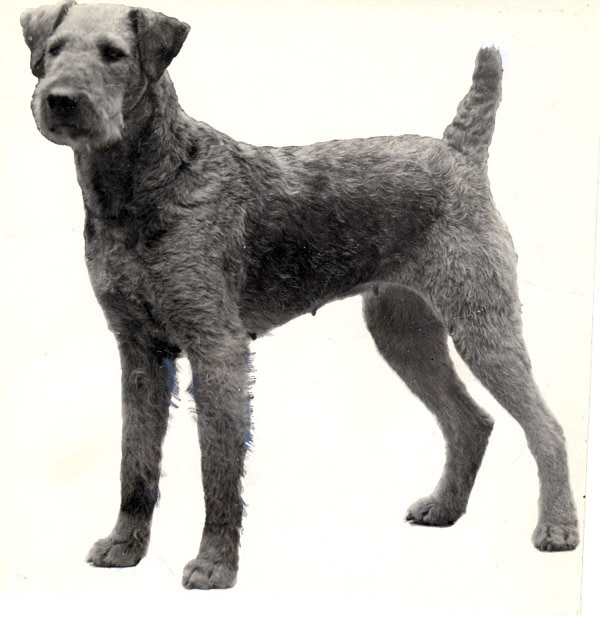
- Ch. Briergate Bright Beauty
- Species: Dog
- Breed: Airedale Terrier
- Sex: Female
- Born: October 27, 1915
- Occupation: Show dog
- Title: Best in Show winner, Westminster Kennel Club Dog Show
- Term: 1919
- Predecessor: Haymarket Faultless (1918)
- Successor: Conejo Wycollar Boy (1920)
- Owner: G. L. L. Davis
- Parents: Squireen (sire); Mistress Roney (dam)
- Offspring: Daystar Bright Beauty II (sired by Cragsman Dictator); Ch. Daystar Morning Glory (sired by Cragsman Dictator)

Ch. Briergate Bright Beauty was an Airedale Terrier and the best in show winner at the 1919 Westminster Kennel Club Dog Show. She was bred by Mr. Davidson, owned by G. L. L. Davis of St. Louis, and at the show was handled by Alfred Delmont. Bright Beauty was an imported dog.

Bright Beauty was not a popular pick for best in show. Most thought that best in show would be awarded to Haymarket Faultless. Instead, Faultless took reserve winner, and the judges awarded Bright Beauty best in show. The show was judged by Harry T. Peters, Theodore Offerman, and J. Willoughby Mitchell.
