= Midkiff Seductive =

Ch. Midkiff Seductive
- Species: Canis lupus familiaris
- Breed: Cocker Spaniel
- Sex: Female
- Born: 1917
- Occupation: Show dog
- Title: Best In Show at the Westminster Dog Show
- Term: 1921–1922
- Predecessor: Ch. Conejo Wycollar Boy (Wire Fox Terrier)
- Successor: Ch. Boxwood Barkentine (Airedale Terrier)
- Owner: William T. Payne
- Parents: Midkiff Rex (sire); Midkiff Winsome (dam)
- Offspring: Ch. Midkiff Miracle Man
- Appearance: Black and white

Ch. Midkiff Seductive (born 1917), a Cocker Spaniel, was the Best in Show at the 1921 Westminster Kennel Club Dog Show, the first occasion it was awarded to a member of that breed. The judging in the Best in Show round had a split decision by the two judges, and required the referee to make a deciding vote.

== Early life ==
Midkiff Seductive was a black and white Cocker Spaniel bred and owned by William T. Payne.

== Show career ==
At the Westminster Kennel Club Dog Show in 1921, Seductive won the Best of Breed for Cocker Spaniels, and went on to win Mortimer Memorial Trophy for best American bred dog. Having reached the Best in Show round, she faced off against the Best of Breed of 20 other dog breeds. The other dogs in the final round included the Bull Terrier Ch. Haymarket Faultless, the Best in Show champion from the 1918 show. The final decision by judges Charles Hopton and Norman K. Swine was split, after two and a half hours of judging in the final round, the field was narrowed down to Seductive, the Pekingese Phantom of Ashcroft, the Boston Terrier Buddie Blink and an Airedale Terrier. This was then cut to leave only Seductive and Phantom left, and after further consideration between the two judges, a decision could not be reached. The referee, Dr. De Mund, was then invited to make a deciding decision. After sending the dogs around the ring a final time, he chose Midkiff Seductive, the crowd signaling their approval for the more popular choice. De Mund said of his choice, "They were two splendid dogs. I gave the Cocker the prize over the Pekingese Phantom of Ashcroft because I consider that she is a better Cocker Spaniel than the Pekingese is a Pekingese." Her victory at Westminster made her the first Cocker Spaniel to win the title of Best in Show.

At the show of the Ladies' Kennel Association of America in Mineola, New York, Seductive won the Best of Breed title but was beaten for Best in Show by the Airedale Terrier Ch. Polam Maxim. She was not entered in the 1922 Westminster show.

== Later life ==
Seductive was bred with Ch. Robinhurst Foreglow, and produced Ch. Midkiff Miracle Man who went on to win Best in Show at the American Spaniel Club's annual show in 1925 and 1926. Her trophy for Best Cocker Spaniel owned by a member of the American Spaniel Club which she won at Westminster in 1921 is now on display at the American Kennel Club Library in New York.
