= Truth or Consequences Municipal Airport =

- IATA: TCS; ICAO: KTCS; FAA LID: TCS

Summary
- Airport type: Public
- Operator: City of Truth or Consequences
- Location: Truth or Consequences, New Mexico
- Elevation AMSL: 4,853 ft / 1,479 m
- Coordinates: 33°14′13″N 107°16′18″W
- Interactive map of Truth or Consequences Municipal Airport

Runways
Direction	Length		Surface
Direction	ft	m	Surface
13/31	7,200	2,195	Asphalt
11/29	7,000	2,134	Dirt
1/19	3,250	991	Dirt
15/33	3,200	975	Dirt
7/25	2,900	884	Dirt

Truth or Consequences Municipal Airport (IATA: TCS, ICAO: KTCS, FAA LID: TCS) is a public-use airport located six miles (10 km) north of Truth or Consequences, a town in Sierra County, New Mexico, United States. This general aviation airport is publicly owned by the city of Truth or Consequences. It has five runways, one of which is paved. The paved runway (13/31) is used for most flights.

== History ==
The airport briefly saw scheduled airline service in the early 1950s when Continental Airlines landed its DC-3s as one of several stops made along their original route from Denver to El Paso. Zia Airlines flights from Albuquerque to Las Cruces in the mid-1970s would stop at the airport upon request.
