= Conejo Wycollar Boy =

Wire Fox Terrier

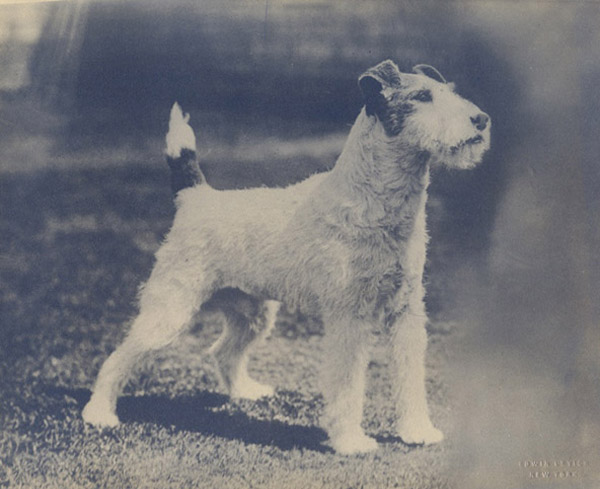
- Species: Dog
- Breed: Wire Fox Terrier
- Title: Best in show at the Westminster Kennel Club Dog Show
- Term: 1917, 1920
- Predecessor: Matford Vic (1916); Briergate Bright Beauty (1919)
- Successor: Haymarket Faultless (1918); Midkiff Seductive (1921)
- Owner: Mrs. Roy A. Rainey

Ch. Wycollar Boy was a Wire Fox Terrier who won best in show at the 1917 and 1920 Westminster Kennel Club Dog Show, in New York City. His owner was Mrs. Roy A. Rainey.
