= Alain Bertrand =

French politician (1951–2020)

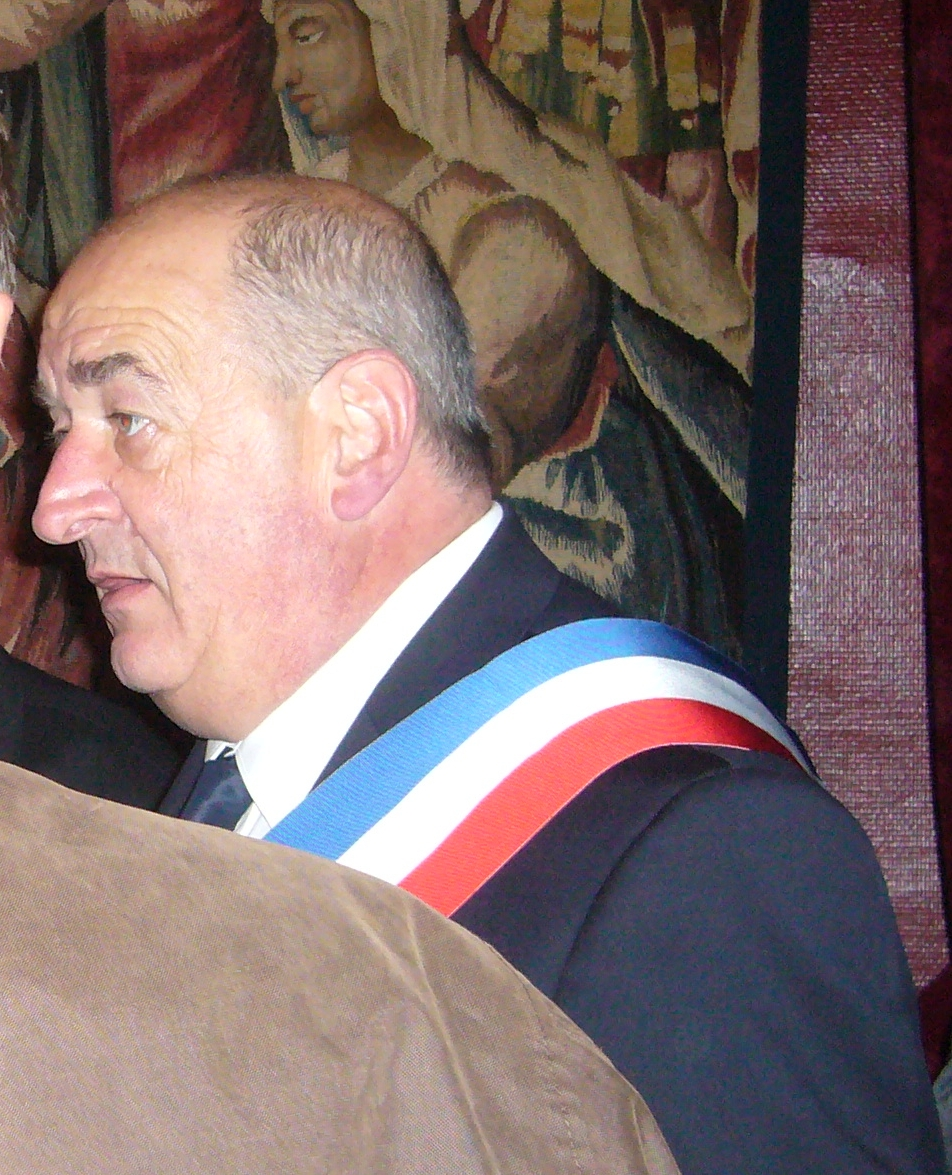
- Alain Bertrand in 2008

Member of the French Senate for Lozère
- In office 18 March 2012 – 3 March 2020
- Succeeded by: Guylène Pantel

Mayor of Mende
- In office 21 March 2008 – 10 May 2016
- Preceded by: Jean-Jacques Delmas
- Succeeded by: Laurent Suau

Personal details
- Born: 23 February 1951 Saint-Juéry, France
- Died: 3 March 2020 (aged 69) Mende, France
- Party: Socialist Party; La République En Marche!

Alain Bertrand (23 February 1951 – 3 March 2020) was a French politician. Born in Saint-Juéry, Tarn, he was originally a member of the Socialist Party before switching to LREM. At the time of his death, Bertrand had served as the Senate's representative of the Lozère department since 2012. He was mayor of Mende from 2008 to 2016. He also previously served as the vice-president of the regional council of Languedoc-Roussillon from 2004 to 2011.

On 3 March 2020, Bertrand died in Mende of an unspecified illness, at the age of 69.
