= United Nations Security Council Resolution 963 =

UN Security Council Resolution 963
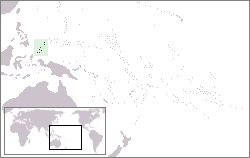
- Palau (highlighted)
- Date: 29 November 1994
- Meeting no.: 3,469
- Code: S/RES/963 (Document)
- Subject: Admission of new Members to the UN: Palau
- Voting summary: 15 voted for; None voted against; None abstained
- Result: Adopted

Security Council composition
- Permanent members: China; France; Russia; United Kingdom; United States
- Non-permanent members: Argentina; Brazil; Czech Republic; Djibouti; New Zealand; Nigeria; Oman; Pakistan; Rwanda; Spain

United Nations Security Council resolution 963, adopted unanimously on 29 November 1994, after examining the application of the Republic of Palau for membership in the United Nations, the Council recommended to the General Assembly that Palau be admitted.

On 15 December 1994, the General Assembly admitted the Republic of Palau under Resolution 49/63.

== See also ==
- United Nations Security Council Resolution 956
- Member states of the United Nations
- List of United Nations Security Council Resolutions 901 to 1000 (1994–1995)
