= William R. Norwood =

William R. Norwood (May 29, 1909 – September 22, 1981) was an American government official who served as High Commissioner of the Trust Territory of the Pacific Islands from May 27, 1966, to May 1, 1969. Among his responsibilities were overseeing use of Bikini Atoll following nuclear testing on the island.

Norwood also served in various positions engaged in the economic development of Hawaii. Norwood died in Waialua, Hawaii.
