= Charles Jordan (government official) =

American government official

Charles D. "Chuck" Jordan is an American architect and government official. He served as Director of the Office of Transition for the Trust Territory of the Pacific Islands from November 3, 1986, to September 30, 1991. The office was based in Saipan.

== Life and career ==
Jordan was born in New York and raised in California. He graduated from the School of Architecture at California State Polytechnic University in San Luis Obispo in 1972. He joined the Peace Corps as a volunteer, working for the Yap District Planning Office. After two years in Ulithi and a return to California, Jordan returned to Yap in 1978 as the Yap State Planner. In 1981 he moved to Saipan as Director of the Office of Planning and Statistics for the Trust Territory of the Pacific Islands. There he oversaw grants for the United States Department of Energy, United States Department of Housing and Urban Development, Environmental Protection Agency, Federal Aviation Agency and the Federal Emergency Management Agency. Jordan also coordinated the closure of the Trust Territory of the Pacific Islands. He also managed expenditure of US$400 million of Capital Improvement Project funding in Republic of Palau, Federated States of Micronesia and the Republic of the Marshall Islands.

Jordan opened his own architectural practice in 1991. Jordan later served as President of Wendy's Saipan, Inc., a franchisee of Wendy's. After Jordan designed and opened one restaurant in Saipan in 1996, it filed for bankruptcy in 2001. Jordan later worked as a special advisor for CIP Management. In 2002 he went to work with Governor Juan Babauta as his Special Advisor for Capital Improvement Project Management. He was later named a Partner with RIM Architects and was named Principal in charge of their Saipan office.
