= Jean-Jacques Delmas =

French physician

Member of the National Assembly for Lozère's 1st constituency
- In office 2 April 1993 – 21 April 1997
- Preceded by: Adrien Durand
- Succeeded by: Jean-Claude Chazal

Mayor of Mende
- In office 14 March 1983 – 16 March 2008
- Preceded by: Pierre Couderc
- Succeeded by: Alain Bertrand

Personal details
- Born: 4 October 1938 Le Malzieu-Ville, France
- Died: 8 February 2010 (aged 71) Mende, France
- Party: UDF
- Profession: General practitioner

Jean-Jacques Delmas (4 October 1938 – 8 February 2010) was a French physician and politician.
