= Delmas Howe =

American painter

- Born: Delmas Howe; October 22, 1935 (age 90); El Paso, Texas, US
- Occupations: Artist, painter

Delmas Howe (born October 22, 1935) is a contemporary American painter and muralist known for his homoerotic depictions of the American West. His work often portrays cowboys and rodeo scenes with a neoclassical, almost mythological sensibility, blending Renaissance and Baroque influences with Southwestern themes. Based in Truth or Consequences, New Mexico, Howe challenges traditional Western iconography by centering queer narratives in a genre historically dominated by rugged masculinity.

== Early life ==
Howe was born in El Paso, Texas and was raised in Truth or Consequences, NM. After graduation from high school he progressed through undergraduate work at Wichita State University, Howe spent four years in the US Air Force. After serving in the Air Force, Howe moved to the East Coast where he completed graduate work at Yale University.

In 1960, Howe moved to New York City where he took courses at the Art Students League of New York while working as a professional musician. One of Howe's instructor was the renowned anatomist, draftsman, and curator Robert Beverly Hale. Hale instructed Howe on drawing the human figure.

Howe stepped out of his New York apartment one day and happened upon the Stonewall Riots. He initially believed it was part of a raucous party before realizing it was a legitimate riot.

In the late 1970s, Howe returned to the West and opened a successful design studio in Amarillo, Texas where he painted The Three Graces. Shortly thereafter, Howe moved back to Truth or Consequences, NM.

== Work ==
His work is in the collections of a number of museums including the British Museum, the New Mexico Museum of Art, the Albuquerque Museum where his painting The Three Graces (1978) is on permanent view, and the Amarillo Museum of Art.

== Rodeo Pantheon Series ==
In the late 1970s, Howe moved back west, first to Texas then back to Truth or Consequences, in order to care for his aging parents. In an attempt to meld his Southern New Mexico childhood and his love of the École des Beaux-Arts style, Howe painted The Three Graces while still living in Amarillo. The Three Graces was the first painting that would become Howe's Rodeo Pantheon Series.

The series reimagines the classical mythological figures of Greek and Roman mythology as Cowboys. Howe employed the vernacular of the École des Beaux-Arts style to create the Rodeo Pantheon series, which reimagined the cowboys as homoerotic figures in poses and scenes which were otherwise larger than life.

Upon the Albuquerque Museum of Art's acquisition of The Three Graces, Curator of Art Andrew Connors stated

Everybody carries around the stereotype of the brave cowboy as Marlboro Man. Yet that stereotype usually does not include the knowledge that the first cowboys were the Spanish-speaking vaqueros. It doesn’t include the knowledge that there were African-American cowboys, and probably [as portrayed in the 2005 movie Brokeback Mountain] gay cowboys as well. The painting by Delmas allows us as a museum to open up the story of the cowboy once again and show that history is more interesting and diverse than we’ve been led to believe. I’d go so far as to say that having a multitude of stories told through the art in a museum provides the opportunity for every viewer to get closer to what it means to be human.

In the foreword to Howe's 1993 monograph on the Rodeo Pantheon series, British photographer and art historian, Edward Lucie-Smith described Howe's art as "a new species of polemical avant-garde art."

== Guys and Canyons Series (2009–2015) ==
The Guys and Canyons series depicts nude male bodies intertwined with each other, typically in the foreground, against backgrounds of straining and buckling canyon walls. The male figures mimic the canyon walls.

== Mood Drawings: The Good Grief Series (2023) ==
The Mood Drawings series marked Howe's first series of strictly abstract works.

== Recognition ==
In 2006, Delmas received the New Mexico Governor's Awards for Excellence in the Arts.

== Film and Video ==
The Truth or Consequences of Delmas Howe is a documentary which explores Howe's life, his work, and the controversy it has generated.
