= Delmas H. Nucker =

American government official

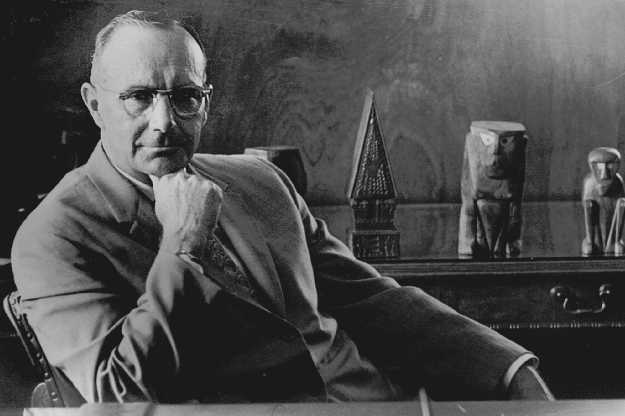
1960 portrait photograph

Delmas Henry Nucker (April 12, 1907 – March 26, 1985) was an American government official who served as High Commissioner of the Trust Territory of the Pacific Islands from September 1, 1954, to May 1, 1961.

== Life and career ==
Delmas Nucker was born in Terre Haute, Indiana. He attended Brown's Business College in Galesburg, Illinois. He married Catherine ("Katy") Moore and together they had one son, William James, in 1927. He worked at the Independent Oil Company from 1927 until 1942. Throughout the Great Depression they lived in Pennsylvania in various locations, chiefly Altoona. Mr. Nucker served with the Office of Price Administration, organizing rationing boards in the central third of Pennsylvania during World War II. At the close of the war, from 1943 to 1947 Mr. Nucker became an administrator for the newly-formed United Nations Relief and Rehabilitation Administration (UNRRA). He recruited personnel for foreign offices of the mission, travelling to England, France, Belgium, Holland, and ultimately China.

He joined the United States Department of the Interior. Later he was appointed Assistant to the General Manager of the Alaska Railroad in Anchorage, Alaska.

Mr. Nucker served as Director, United States Agency for International Development mission to Afghanistan from 1963 to 1967.

== See also ==
- United Nations Relief and Rehabilitation Administration
- Brown's Business College
