= KCHS (AM) =

- Truth Or Consequences, New Mexico; United States
- Frequency: 1400 kHz

Programming
- Format: Country music

Ownership
- Owner: GPK Media LLC

History
- First air date: 1988
- Call sign meaning: "Keep coming to Hot Springs", the former name of its city of license

Technical information
- Licensing authority: FCC
- Facility ID: 47137
- Class: C
- Power: 1,000 watts unlimited
- Transmitter coordinates: 33°8′26″N 107°13′55″W

Links
- Public license information: Public file; LMS
- Webcast: Listen Live
- Website: Official website

KCHS (1400 AM) is a radio station broadcasting a country music format. Licensed to Truth Or Consequences, New Mexico, United States. The station is currently owned by GPK Media LLC.
