= Serge Delmas =

French footballer (born 1947)

Personal information
- Date of birth: 14 May 1947 (age 79)
- Place of birth: Montpellier, France
- Position: Winger

Senior career*
Years	Team	Apps	(Gls)
1965–1977	Montpellier		

Managerial career
- 1979–1984: Montpellier (head of youth dpt.)
- 1984–1992: Toulouse (head of youth dpt.)
- 1992–1994: Toulouse
- 1995–1998: Bastia (head of youth dpt.)
- 1998–2000: Nîmes
- 2000–2009: Montpellier (head of youth dpt.)
- * Club domestic league appearances and goals

Serge Delmas (born 14 May 1947) is a French former football player and manager.

He played as a winger.
