= Adrian P. Winkel =

American politician

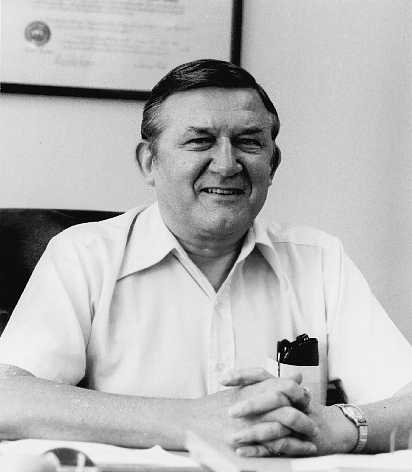
During the 1970s

Adrian Paul Winkel (April 19, 1915 – November 29, 1994) was an American politician and High Commissioner of the Trust Territory of the Pacific Islands.

Born in Breckenridge, Minnesota, Winkel graduated from Saint John's University in Minnesota. After teaching high school in Minnesota and Wisconsin, he worked with the Minnesota Commissioner of Taxation, the public works department of Saint Paul, Minnesota and the United States Post Office. He also served as an administrative assistant to Congressmen Eugene McCarthy and Philip Burton and was chairman of the Minnesota Democratic Farmer-Labor Party. He served as High Commissioner of the Trust Territory of the Pacific Islands from 1977 to 1981.

== Notes ==
Party political offices
Preceded by Ray Hemenway	Democratic-Farmer-Labor Party Chairman; 1960-1961	Succeeded by George Farr
