= Guylène Pantel =

French politician

Member of the French Senate for Lozère
- Incumbent
- Assumed office 4 March 2020
- Preceded by: Alain Bertrand

Personal details
- Born: 14 December 1963 (age 62)
- Party: Socialist Party

Guylène Pantel (14 December 1963) is a French politician of Socialist Party (PS) who has been serving as a member of the French Senate since 2017, representing Lozère.

== Biography ==
Pantel was elected municipal councilor of Ispagnac in the first round of the municipal elections of 2008. She became the first deputy mayor of this municipality on 4 April 2014, then interim mayor on 28 May 2018. She was elected mayor on 31 July. She was elected departmental councilor of Lozère for the canton of Florac in 2015, then became fourth vice-president of the departmental council of Lozère on 2 April 2015. In January 2017, she became first vice-president of the newly created community of municipalities Gorges Causses Cévennes.

On 4 March 2020, Pantel became a senator for Lozère following the death of Alain Bertrand. Following her appointment, not being able to hold these positions, she resigned from her duties as mayor, vice-president of the community of communes and vice-president of the departmental council. She was not renewed in her mandate as municipal councilor of Ispagnac during the municipal elections of 2020.

== Personal life ==
Pantel was the first member of the Senate and inhabitant of Lozère to have tested positive for COVID-19, on 13 March 2020.
