= Frank E. Midkiff =

Frank Elbert Midkiff (November 15, 1887 – August 7, 1983) was an American educator and civic leader. He served as High Commissioner of the Trust Territory of the Pacific Islands from March 13, 1953, to September 1, 1954.

== Life and career ==
Midkiff was born in Anna, Illinois. He served as principal of Lewistown High School in Lewistown, Illinois from 1908 to 1910. He then worked at the Kimberly Gold Mines, Jardine, Montana before taking a position as instructor of English and coach for baseball and football at Peddie Institute, Hightstown, New Jersey. Midkiff graduated from Colgate University in 1912. He went on to teach English and head the athletics at Oahu College in 1913. He served in the United States Army during World War I from 1918 to 1919. After his honorable discharge, he joined the firm of Lewers & Cooke, Ltd. He served as President of Kamehameha Schools from 1923 to 1934.

He earned his Ph.D. in education from Yale University in 1935. He served as Acting President, Honolulu Chamber of Commerce. He was appointed by President Dwight D. Eisenhower to the position of High Commissioner of the Trust Territory of the Pacific Islands.

Midkiff died in Honolulu, Hawai'i on August 7, 1983. The Frank E. Midkiff Learning Center at Kamehameha Schools was named in his honor in 1977.
