= Victor Delmas =

French professional rugby union player

- Born: 31 May 1991 (age 35) France
- Height: 1.89 m (6 ft 2 in)
- Weight: 116 kg (256 lb; 18 st 4 lb)

Rugby union career
- Position: Prop/Tight-head Prop
Senior career
Years	Team	Apps	(Points)
2011-2018	Colomiers	120	(10)
2018-2019	Bath	4	(0)
2019-Nov 2019	Biarritz Olympique	0	(0)
Dec 2019-	Colomiers	8	(0)
- Correct as of 7 April 2018
International career
Years	Team	Apps	(Points)
- France

Victor Delmas (born 31 May 1991) is a French professional rugby union player. He plays at prop for US Colomiers. Delmas was signed by Bath, to provide backup in the tight-head prop position that he specialises. He was expected to join at the end of the 2017/2018 English Premiership rugby season, but was allowed to leave early and made his Bath debut coming on as a sub on 7 April 2018. Delmas previously played for French Pro D2 side US Colomiers. Achieving over 100 appearances.

He was signed by Bath on 28 March 2018. Delmas struggled for game time, collecting only two appearances from the bench for the English Premiership side. He signed a deal with Biarritz Olympique ahead of the 2019-2020 Rugby union season in France.
