= Haymarket Faultless =

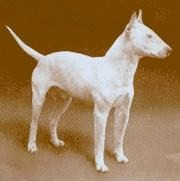
- Haymarket Faultless
- Species: Dog
- Breed: Bull Terrier
- Sex: Male
- Title: Best in show at the Westminster Kennel Club Dog Show
- Term: 1918
- Predecessor: Conejo Wycollar Boy (1917)
- Successor: Briergate Bright Beauty (1919)
- Owner: R.H. Elliot

Ch. Haymarket Faultless was a male Bull Terrier who won best in show at the 1918 Westminster Kennel Club Dog Show. He was bred and owned by R.H. Elliot. Haymarket Fautless narrowly beat out a Pekingese, Phantom of Ashcroft. The show was so close that the referee had to be called in to decide the winner.
