= United Nations Security Council Resolution 21 =

United Nations Security Council resolution

UN Security Council Resolution 21
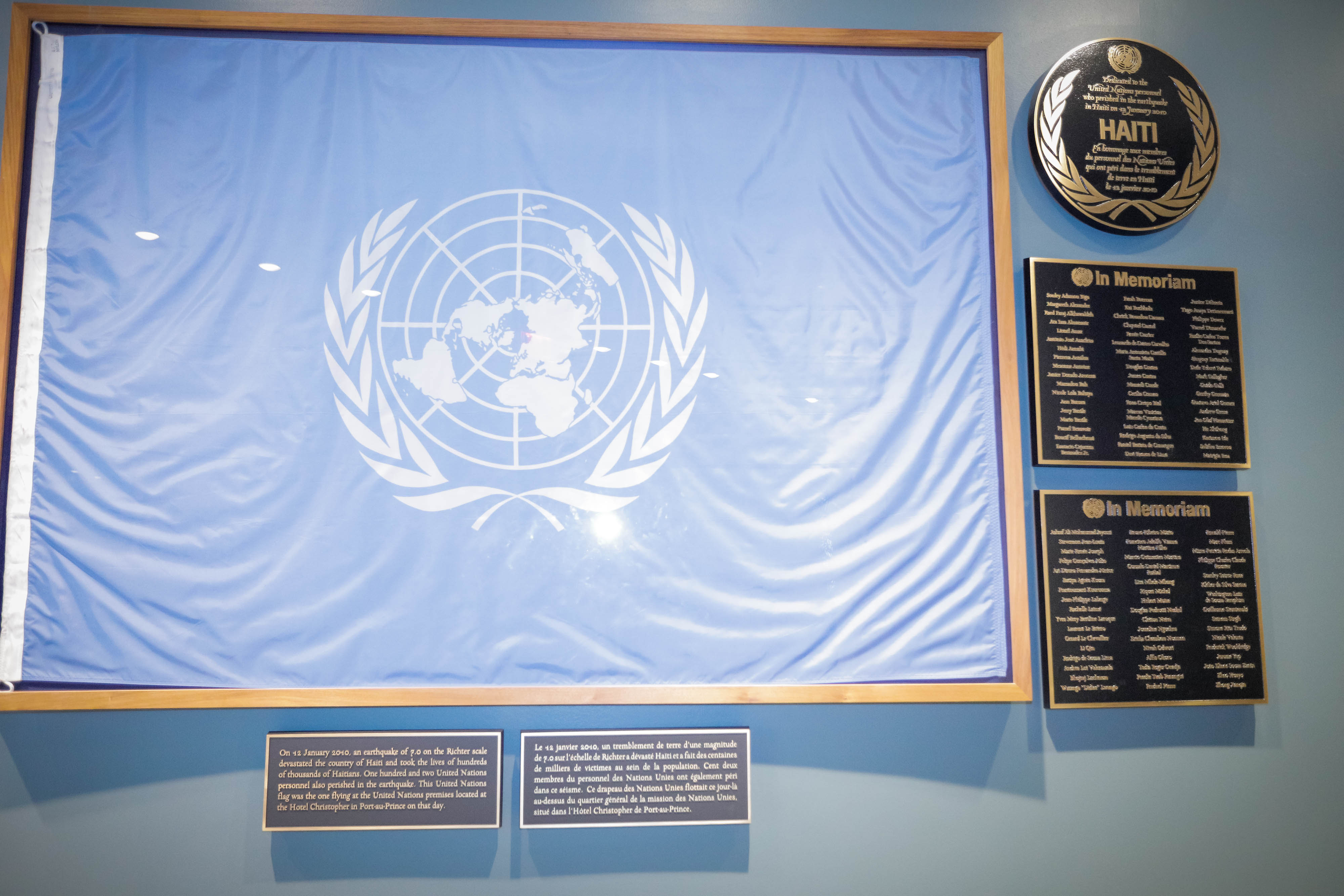
- UN flag
- Date: April 2 1947
- Meeting no.: 124
- Code: S/318 (Document)
- Subject: Trusteeship of strategic areas
- Voting summary: 11 voted for; None voted against; None abstained
- Result: Adopted

Security Council composition
- Permanent members: China; France; Soviet Union; United Kingdom; United States
- Non-permanent members: Australia; Belgium; Brazil; Colombia; Poland; Syria

United Nations Security Council Resolution 21 was adopted unanimously on 2 April 1947. The Council placed the German Pacific Islands, which were formerly mandated to Japan by the League of Nations, under the Trusteeship System.

The United States was declared as the administering authority and was given permission to militarize the territory.

== See also ==
- Trust Territory of the Pacific Islands
