= Trust Territory of the Pacific Islands =

UN trust territory (1947–1994)

- 1947–1994
- Flag (1965–1980) Emblem (1965–1980)

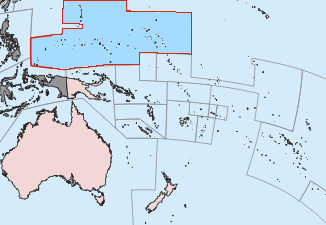
- Location of the Trust Territory of the Pacific Islands in the Pacific
- Status: United Nations Trust Territory under the administration of the United States
- Capital and largest city: Saipan; 15.19°N 145.74°E
- Official languages: English
- Recognised languages: Micronesian languages
- Chief of State
  - 1947–1953 (first): Harry S. Truman
  - 1993–1994 (last): Bill Clinton
- High Commissioner
  - 1947–1948 (first): Louis E. Denfeld
  - 1981–1987 (last): Janet J. McCoy
- Legislature: Congress
- Historical era: Cold War
  - Trusteeship: July 18, 1947
  - Termination of administration (Marshall Islands): October 21, 1986
  - Termination of administration (Micronesia): November 3, 1986
  - Free Association and De jure independence of Palau: October 1, 1994
- Currency: United States dollar
- ISO 3166 code: PC
Preceded by
| South Seas Mandate |
Succeeded by
| Marshall Islands |
| Federated States of Micronesia |
| Northern Mariana Islands |
| Palau |
- 1. Clinton was President when Palau's Compact of Free Association took effect. Ronald Reagan was President when the final status of the RMI, FSM, and CNMI took effect.; 2. McCoy retired as High Commissioner in 1987. As Palau was still a part of the TTPI, it was administered by officials in the Office of Territorial and International Affairs until 1994.

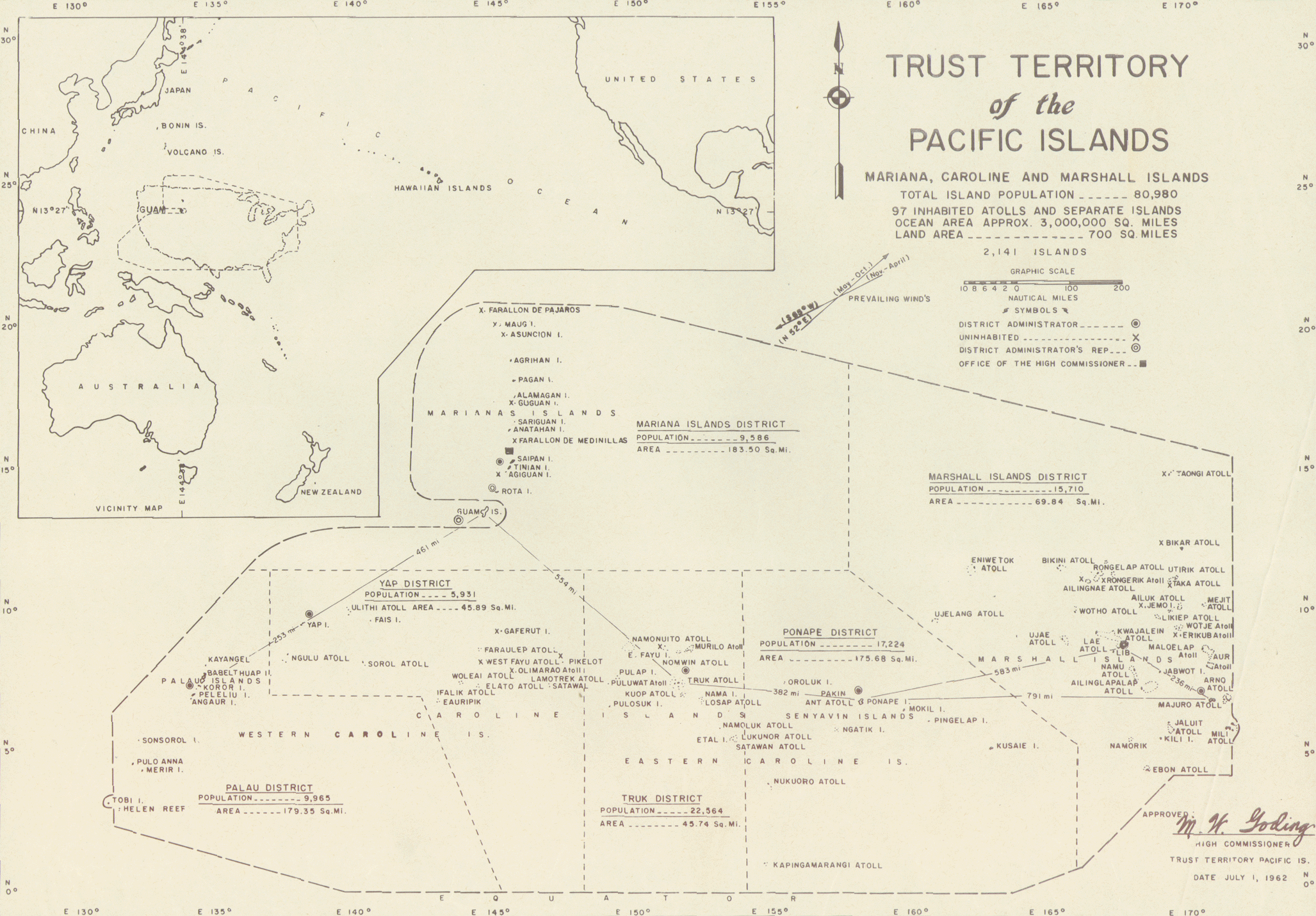
Map of the TTPI from 1961

The Trust Territory of the Pacific Islands (TTPI) was a United Nations trust territory in Micronesia administered by the United States from 1947 to 1994. The Imperial Japanese South Seas Mandate had been seized by the US during the Pacific War, as Japan had administered the territory since the League of Nations gave Japan a mandate over the area from Imperial Germany after World War I. However, in the 1930s, Japan left the League of Nations and invaded additional lands. During World War II, military control of the islands was contested, but by the war's end, the islands had come under the Allies' control. The Trust Territory of the Pacific was created to administer the islands as part of the United States while still under the auspices of the United Nations. Most of the island groups in the territory became independent states, with some degree of association kept with the United States: the Federated States of Micronesia, the Republic of the Marshall Islands and Palau are independent states in a Compact of Free Association with the US, while the Northern Mariana Islands remain under US jurisdiction, as an unincorporated territory and commonwealth.

== History ==
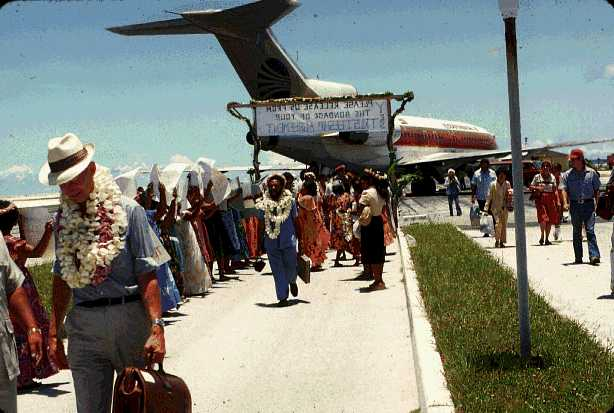
Arrival of UN Visiting Mission, Majuro, 1978. The sign reads, "Please release us from the bondage of your trusteeship agreement."

Spain initially claimed the islands that later composed the territory of the Trust Territory of the Pacific Islands (TTPI). Subsequently, Germany established competing claims over the islands. The competing claims were eventually resolved in favor of Germany when Spain, following its loss of several possessions to the United States during the Spanish–American War, ceded its claims over the islands to Germany pursuant to the German–Spanish Treaty (1899). Germany, in turn, continued to retain possession until the islands were captured by Japan during World War I. The League of Nations formally placed the islands in the former South Seas Mandate, a mandate that authorized Japanese administration of the islands. The islands then remained under Japanese control until captured by the United States in 1944 during World War II.

The TTPI entered UN trusteeship pursuant to Security Council Resolution 21 on July 18, 1947, and was designated a "strategic area" in its 1947 trusteeship agreement. Article 83 of the UN Charter provided that, as such, its formal status as a UN trust territory could be terminated only by the Security Council and not by the General Assembly as with other trust territories. The United States Navy controlled the TTPI from a headquarters in Guam until 1951, when the United States Department of the Interior took over control, administering the territory from a base in Saipan.

The Territory contained 100,000 people scattered over a water area the size of the continental United States. It was subdivided into six districts and represented a variety of cultures, with nine spoken languages. The Pohnpeians and Kosraeans, Marshallese and Palauans, Chuukese, Yapese and Chamorros had little in common, except they were in the same general area of the Pacific Ocean.

The large distances between people, the lack of an economy, and language and cultural barriers all worked against the union. The six district centers became upscale slums, containing deteriorated Japanese-built roads, electricity, modern music, and distractions, which alienated youth and elders. The remainder of the islands maintained their traditional way of life and infrastructure.

In the late 1960s, the US opposed the idea of eventual independence. Instead, they aimed for some form of association, perhaps with Hawaii. They estimated that perhaps 10-25% of the population favored independence.

A Congress of Micronesia first levied an income tax in 1971. It affected mainly foreigners working at military bases in the region.

On October 21, 1986, the US ended its administration of the Marshall Islands District. The termination of US administration of the Chuuk, Yap, Kosrae, Pohnpei, and the Mariana Islands districts of the TTPI soon followed on November 3, 1986. The Security Council formally ended the trusteeship for the Chuuk, Yap, Kosrae, Pohnpei, Mariana Islands, and Marshall Islands districts on December 22, 1990, pursuant to Security Council Resolution 683. On May 25, 1994, the Council ended the trusteeship for the Palau District pursuant to Security Council Resolution 956, after which the US and Palau agreed to establish the latter's independence on October 1.

== Government ==
The islands were administered by a High Commissioner who was appointed by the US President. However, the Commissioner served under the US Secretary of the Interior. A judiciary also existed as well for the territory as a whole along with legislatures for each of the districts.

== Geography ==
In 1969, the 100 occupied islands comprised 700 square miles (1,800 km^{2}) over an area of 3,000,000 square miles (7,800,000 km^{2}) of sea. The latter area was comparable in size to the continental United States. The water area is about 5% of the Pacific Ocean.

== Demographics ==
The islands' population was 200,000 in the latter part of the 19th century. The population decreased to 100,000 by 1969 due to emigration, war, and disease. At that time, the population inhabited less than 100 out of 2,141 of the Marshall, Mariana, and Caroline Islands.

- 1958: 70,724
- 1970: 90,940

== Education ==
All instruction was in English in the Trust Territory at educational facilities. The government of the Trust Territory had a goal of establishing universal free education from elementary school through high school. Natives did participate in educational administration in the territory.

In 1947, the Mariana Islands' Teacher Training School (MITTS), a normal school serving all areas of the Trust Territory, opened in Guam. It moved to Chuuk in 1948, to be more central in the Trust Territory, and was renamed Pacific Islands' Teacher Training School (PITTS). It transitioned from being a normal school to a comprehensive secondary school, so it was renamed the Pacific Islands Central School (PICS). The school moved to Pohnpei in 1959. It was a three-year institution housing students who graduated from intermediate schools. The school, later known as Pohnpei Island Central School (PICS), is now Bailey Olter High School.

Palau Intermediate School, established in 1946, became Palau High School in 1962 as it added senior high grades. From the late 1960s to the middle of the 1970s, several public high schools were built or received additions in the Trust Territory. They included Jaluit High School, Kosrae High School, Marshall Islands High School in Majuro, Palau High, PICS, and Truk High School (now Chuuk High School). The Micronesian Occupational College in Koror, Palau, was also built. It later merged with the Kolonia-based Community College of Micronesia, which began operations in 1969, into the College of Micronesia-FSM in 1976.

== Economy ==
The economy of the TTPI was largely based on subsistence farming and fishing along with to a degree copra and tourism. There was a heavy dependency upon the United States.

The US Dollar served as the currency as it did not have a currency of its own. Banks from the United States did provide their services in the territory with a presence being in every district.

=== Transportation ===
Transportation was provided by sea for cargo and by air for passengers.

Passenger air service was available to all districts in the TTPI initially via the United States Navy until 1951, then Trust Territory Air Service from 1951 to 1968, and thereafter by Air Micronesia, later known as Continental Micronesia.

== Status ==
Following the termination of the trusteeship, the territory of the former TTPI became four separate jurisdictions:

=== Sovereign states in free association with the United States ===
The following sovereign states have become freely associated with the United States under the Compact of Free Association (COFA).

- Republic of the Marshall Islands – established 1979, COFA effective October 21, 1986
- Federated States of Micronesia – established 1979, COFA effective November 3, 1986
- Republic of Palau – established 1981, COFA effective October 1, 1994

=== Commonwealth in political union with the United States ===
- Commonwealth of the Northern Mariana Islands – new constitution partially effective January 1, 1978, and fully effective November 4, 1986.

== See also ==
- High Commissioner of the Trust Territory of the Pacific Islands
- Congress of the Trust Territory of the Pacific Islands

== Bibliography ==
- Howard, Paul (November–December 1999). "Pioneering in the Trusts: Postwar Airline Pioneering in US Trust Territory". Air Enthusiast (84): 35–40. ISSN 0143-5450.
