= Hot Springs Artesian Basin =

Geological formation in New Mexico

Coordinates: 33.1108°N 107.3020°W

The Hot Springs Artesian Basin is a geological formation and thermal water aquifer located in the floodplain of the Rio Grande, in Sierra County, New Mexico.

The rocks that make up the Hot Springs Artesian Basin and the surrounding the basin area include igneous, sedimentary, and metamorphic rocks. These range in age from the Pre-Cambrian (granite and schists) to the recent period. The major structural features mainly formed during early Tertiary igneous activity when andesite, latite and rhyolite was extruded to form the Black Range and the San Mateo Mountains in the Oligocene time. The thermal springs in the basin are located within the city of Truth or Consequences (formerly Hot Springs), New Mexico; temperatures of these hot springs range from 98°F to 114°F.

The water table at Hot Springs Artesian Basin slopes downward 9 feet over a half mile, from 4,239 feet in elevation where the alluvium in the aquifer coincides with the piezometric surface at limestone hill, sloping downward to 4,230 feet at the granite bluff base where the alluvium extrudes. Some of the water flowing down the slope is intercepted by sumps and drains, however most of it discharges in the Rio Grande.
