= International reactions to the January 6 United States Capitol attack =

More than seventy countries and international organizations expressed their concerns over the January 6 United States Capitol attack and condemned the violence, with some specifically condemning President Donald Trump's own role in inciting the attack. Foreign leaders, diplomats, politicians, and institutions expressed shock, outrage, and condemnation of the events. Multiple world leaders made a call for peace, describing the assault as "an attack on democracy". The leaders of some countries, including Brazil, Poland, and Hungary, declined to condemn the situation, and described it as an internal U.S. affair.

As early as January 2021, a few European security officials described the events as an attempted coup.

== Sovereign states ==
=== Africa ===
- Nigeria
  - Former President Goodluck Jonathan criticized Trump, saying that "nobody's political ambition is worth the blood of any citizen, in any part of the world."
  - Former Vice President Atiku Abubakar said the events of January 6 were "a lesson to be learnt: that strong institutions and not strong personalities are the bulwark of a rich democratic culture."
- South Africa
  - President Cyril Ramaphosa said he was "shocked", described it as having "shook the foundations" of American democracy, and "wish[ed the United States] the best as they seek to bring stability to their own democracy." He also said South Africa was willing to help the United States using its own experience with a peaceful transition to democracy.
  - Former opposition leader Mmusi Maimane asked Americans to "respect democracy, to respect rule of law and allow for a peaceful transition to power" and advised them to "follow the example of great democratic states like South Africa which respect outcomes of elections".
- Uganda
  - President Yoweri Museveni said the attack was "not a good idea" and compared it to protests held by opposition leader Bobi Wine, who was running against him in the 2021 Ugandan general election at the time, which Museveni described as a similar "insurrection".
  - Labour Minister Frank Tumwebaze criticized Senator Marco Rubio's statement on the situation for describing the violence as "3rd world style". He said, "So you are benchmarking 3rd world style? This rhetoric & double standard, God have mercy!"
  - General Duties Minister Mary Karooro Okurut said, "The Americans should not come here and try to teach us democracy because after US president Elect Joe Biden was declared, we saw protests everywhere even at Congress. Americans cannot come here to disorganize our peace."
- Zimbabwe – President Emmerson Mnangagwa called back to the fact that the Trump administration had "extended painful economic sanctions placed on Zimbabwe, citing concerns about Zimbabwe's democracy ... yesterday's events showed that the U.S. has no moral right to punish another nation under the guise of upholding democracy."

=== Asia ===
- India – Prime Minister Narendra Modi tweeted, "Distressed to see news about rioting and violence in Washington DC. Orderly and peaceful transfer of power must continue. The democratic process cannot be allowed to be subverted through unlawful protests."
- Iran
  - Supreme Leader Ayatollah Ali Khamenei mocked the situation, saying, "Have you seen the situation in the U.S.? This is their democracy and this is their election fiasco. Today, the U.S. and 'American values' are ridiculed even by their friends."
  - President Hassan Rouhani said Trump was a "sick person" who had caused problems for the world, and that the incident demonstrated the fragility of Western democracy. He claimed that the events show "what a failure Western democracy is" and how Trump, as a "populist man", has "damaged the reputation of his country." He furthered that the incoming Biden administration should "learn" from America's "populism" and make up [for the past] and restore the country to a position worthy of the American nation ... for their own benefit and the good of the world."
- Israel
  - Prime Minister Benjamin Netanyahu said that the "rampage at the Capitol was a disgraceful act that must be vigorously condemned", and condemned "lawlessness and violence".
  - Foreign Minister Gabi Ashkenazi expressed his concern at the attack in "the fortress of world democracy" and said he is "sure that the American people and its representatives will know how to repel the attack and continue strongly defending the values on which America was founded, which are important to all of us."
  - Defense Minister Benny Gantz said, "I never believed I would see such images from the world's most powerful democracy ... This is proof that before political rivalry, we must agree on the rules of the game: maintaining the rule of law, respect for the democratic process and respectful dialogue. I hope this horrific event will come to an end soon, without any casualties."
- Japan
  - Prime Minister Yoshihide Suga stated he was "extremely disappointed by the incident", but drew criticism from opposition politicians for not denouncing it in stronger terms.
  - Chief Cabinet Secretary Katsunobu Kato told reporters "We are hoping for a peaceful transfer of power" and further commented "We hope that American democracy can overcome this difficult situation and that there will be a peaceful and democratic transition with a return to social peace and harmony." However, he declined to condemn Trump personally, stating that he was "looking at this cautiously" and "will refrain from making comment" on Trump's "political strategy". He also stated that Trump had "been calling out for the demonstrators to go back home and has been saying that order should be followed and peace should be restored".
- Kazakhstan – President Kassym-Jomart Tokayev called the seizure of the Capitol as "lawlessness and extremism" by protesters and expressed hope that similar measures would be applied to such actions in other countries.
- Maldives – Former President of the Maldives Mohamed Nasheed wrote on Twitter: "the appalling spectacle at the US Capitol right now, is nothing less than an attempted coup d'état. Having been through one, I know what a coup looks like."
- Nepal – The Nepalese government made no official statement. The Kathmandu Post drew parallels between the attempts to overturn the presidential election and Prime Minister KP Sharma Oli's recent controversial decision to dissolve the House of Representatives.
- Pakistan – Special Assistant to the Prime Minister, Raoof Hasan, wrote on Twitter: "Even when a dog barks in Pakistan, there is concern expressed about the safety of nukes here. With the assault on Capital Hill, there is deepening concern in Pakistan about the safety of nukes in the US."
- Palestine – Palestinian official Hanan Ashrawi tweeted that "while people in Palestine & in many other places in the world are struggling to achieve democracy, there are those in the US who are actively sabotaging theirs."
- People's Republic of China
  - Ministry of Foreign Affairs spokesperson Hua Chunying said China still wished the United States stability and safety but accused U.S. media and politicians of a double standard in praising Hong Kong protesters (Note: See also: 2019–20 Hong Kong protests and Storming of the Legislative Council Complex) but criticizing the attack.
  - In the aftermath of the storming of the United States Capitol, the travelogue America Against America by Politburo member Wang Huning saw a sudden upswing in popularity, with some used copies surging to 16,600 yuan ($2500) on the Chinese auction site Kungfuzi.
- Republic of China (Taiwan) (Note: For the status of Taiwan, see: De facto and de jure states, Political status of Taiwan, List of sovereign states#Taiwan, and List of states with limited recognition)
  - Ministry of Foreign Affairs spokesperson Joanne Ou (Chinese: 歐江安; pinyin: Ōu Jiāng'ān) expressed "regret for the clashes".
- Singapore
  - Senior Minister and Coordinating Minister for National Security Teo Chee Hean said in a Facebook post that "[I] have been up, watching shocking scenes in the US Congress where protesters have entered the Chamber, stopped proceedings and forced Members to flee ... We hope this ends peacefully. It's a sad day."
  - Senior Minister and Coordinating Minister for Social Policies Tharman Shanmugaratnam commented on the attack at the Institute of Policy Studies' Singapore Perspectives Conference, observing: "When people are stuck in the same place for a long time, they get very anxious about relative positions – how they stand relative to those who are catching up from below, as well as how they stand relative to those who are further up the ladder from them." He stressed that this is why Singapore's economy should function as a "moving escalator" that ensures upward mobility for everyone in its society.
  - Speaker of Parliament Tan Chuan-Jin said the events that had transpired in Washington, DC, were "unbelievable". "How did this come to pass? It is increasingly becoming easier to agitate and make people angry. It is not without consequences," he said.
  - Minister for Law and Minister for Home Affairs K. Shanmugam reacted to the attack by writing on his Facebook page that "Many, including many in the media, have condemned the thuggish actions of the protestors. ... In Hong Kong, protestors took over the Legislative Council Building in 2019, vandalised it. They were lauded by some as freedom fighters, democracy heroes. Those lauding them include the very same media which now condemns the actions of the Washington protestors. What explains the different perspectives?" Attached to the post were screenshots of two different headlines in The Guardian – one about the storming of Hong Kong's Legislative Council and the other about the storming of Capitol Hill – highlighting the apparent inconsistency.
  - Minister of State for Culture, Community and Youth and Trade and Industry Low Yen Ling said it was painful to see "shocking images" of the breach on Capitol Hill. "As the American lawmakers reconvene, we hope for a peaceful transition in America," she wrote on Facebook.
- South Korea – The Ministry of Foreign Affairs issued a statement congratulating President-elect Biden "after the U.S. Congress' certification of the Electoral College results on January 7" and further saying the "government looks forward to communicating and cooperating closely with the new Biden administration to further advance" their common goals. The decision not to mention the attack was described in The Diplomat as "curious".
- Turkey
  - President Recep Tayyip Erdoğan said the situation had "shocked humankind" and described it as "an unprecedented incident in American history, a disgrace for democracy". However, he suggested the previous Obama administration was hypocritical for failing to condemn the 2013 Gezi Park protests in the same way. He also criticized restrictions placed by social media companies on Trump, describing them as "digital fascism" and saying, "We cannot also accept the closure of people's communication channels without any legal basis."
  - Speaker of the Grand National Assembly Mustafa Şentop said "We follow the events in the USA with concern and invite the parties to calmness. We believe that problems will always be solved within law and democracy."
  - The Turkish Foreign Ministry released a statement that called the events "worrying".

=== Europe ===
- Austria
  - Chancellor Sebastian Kurz said he was "shocked by the scenes in Washington" and declared that the protests were "an unacceptable assault on democracy" and that "a peaceful and orderly transfer of power must be ensured."
  - President Alexander Van der Bellen described the events as a "populist prodded, anti-democracy attack" and said that "respect for the results of free elections and the peaceful transfer of government power is the foundation of democracy."
- Belarus
  - President Alexander Lukashenko condemned the situation and compared it to unrest in his own country, stating, "I warned you: it's bad when [people] walk down the street, it's even worse when they walk into the courtyards, it will be unbearable when they come to your apartments. We must not allow this." However, he also said there was a "certain fairness" to Trump's election fraud claims, while clarifying that it is "bad when they resort to storming and people die". He also used the situation to defend the Belarusian bid to host the IIHF World Championship: "In our country, protesters and other dissatisfied people don't storm government agencies and capitols."
  - In March 2022, Belarusian authorities granted political asylum to Evan Neumann, a fugitive wanted by the United States for assaulting police officers during the attack.
- Belgium – Prime Minister Alexander De Croo felt "Shock and disbelief at ongoing events at the US Capitol, symbol of American democracy. We trust the strong institutions of the United States will overcome this challenging moment."
- Bulgaria
  - Foreign Minister Ekaterina Zakharieva tweeted that she "denounce[s] the attack on the U.S. Congress buildings. Violence is never a solution. The public order should be restored so that we have a peaceful transfer of power in the U.S."
- Croatia
  - President Zoran Milanović criticized Trump's role in the insurrection, saying "...[Donald] Trump has ruined it all. He incite[s] hate, he is a rabble-rouser and that’s it. This is something you won't hear from the Prime Minister [Andrej Plenković] or the foreign minister, but it needs to be said."
- Cyprus – Foreign Minister Nikos Christodoulides condemned the incident, saying that "the will of the people as freely expressed in elections must be respected."
- Czech Republic
  - Prime Minister Andrej Babiš condemned the attack, describing it as an "unprecedented attack on democracy in the United States" and stating, "I have always condemned violence and chaos like this. Transition of power needs to be smooth and peaceful." He also changed his Twitter profile photo from an image of him wearing a Trump-inspired red cap.
  - President Miloš Zeman criticized Trump personally, accusing him of having "incited thousands of people" and blaming him for having "indirectly caused death of five people who were among his supporters". However, he also criticized social media restrictions placed on Trump, such as the banning of Trump's Twitter account.
  - Minister of Foreign Affairs Tomáš Petříček tweeted "The looting and violence at the US Senate are not a good example for countries where democracy is fighting hard for a place in the sun."
- Denmark
  - Prime Minister Mette Frederiksen wrote, "Extremism, violence, polarization and chaos is never the way forward. Terrible pictures from Washington. May democracy be brought back to working again."
  - Foreign Minister Jeppe Kofod said in a tweet that the footage coming out of Washington was "very concerning", but that he "expects American democracy to once again come out on the right side." He also stressed that Denmark supports the democratic transition in the United States, and he "looks forward to cooperating with the Biden administration".
- Estonia
  - Prime Minister Jüri Ratas called images of the protests "shocking" but he is "confident that the [American] democracy and rule of law are resilient enough to stand strong and uphold any attack".
  - Foreign Minister Urmas Reinsalu described the attacks as "very worrying", adding that he has "full confidence in the rule of law and democratic process in the US".
  - Finance Minister Martin Helme expressed his admiration for Trump and drew attention to election fraud claims by members of the U.S. Congress, "before the riots broke out there". He described the U.S. as a "profoundly divided society" and added that "even if we set aside the person of the currently sitting president, the tensions in that society are such that they will not go away."
- Finland
  - President Sauli Niinistö called the protests "an unbelievable nightmare of democracy."
  - Prime Minister Sanna Marin called the events "very severe and concerning".
- France
  - President Emmanuel Macron issued a video statement describing the events as "not American" and saying that when "supporters of an outgoing president take up arms to challenge the legitimate results of an election, the universal idea – one person, one vote – is undermined."
  - Foreign Minister Jean-Yves Le Drian said, "The violence against the American institutions is a grave attack on democracy. I condemn it. The will and the vote of the American people must be respected."
- Georgia
  - Prime Minister Giorgi Gakharia tweeted "We reaffirm full solidarity and support to our strategic partner. Disturbing images of violence at the Capitol Hill, attack on state institutions is unacceptable. We believe in the strength of US democracy and are confident that democratic institutions will prevail."
  - President Salome Zourabichvili tweeted "For 30 years, the US has supported Georgia's path toward liberty and democracy. We've looked to the USA as an example. Despite [yesterday's] troubling scenes, US institutions have proven their strength, resilience in the face of violence. Georgia needs a strong United States to lead the democratic world."
- Germany
  - Chancellor Angela Merkel said that the events in Washington D.C. left her "angry and sad" and attributed blame to President Trump for failing to accept his defeat in the presidential election, saying both the winning and losing sides in elections had to play their roles "so that democracy itself remains the winner".
  - President Frank-Walter Steinmeier gave a speech at Bellevue Palace during which he called the assault an attack "on the heart of American democracy" and said the events were "the result of lies and more lies, of division and contempt for democracy".
  - President of the Bundestag Wolfgang Schäuble announced that his office would draw its conclusions from the US Capitol breach for the protection of the Bundestag in Berlin and examine improvements to their own parliament's security precautions. For this purpose, the German embassy in Washington D.C. was ordered to provide a precise report about the Capitol incident.
  - Foreign Minister Heiko Maas stated on Twitter: "The enemies of democracy will rejoice at these incomprehensible images from #WashingtonDC. Inflammatory words turn to violent action – on the steps of the Reichstag, and now in the #Capitol."
- Greece – Prime Minister Kyriakos Mitsotakis was "extremely troubled by the violence and horrible events taking place in Washington," adding that "American democracy is resilient, deeply rooted and will overcome this crisis."
- Holy See – Pope Francis said, "I was astonished because they are people so disciplined in democracy." He continued, "There is always something that isn't working ... (with) people taking a path against the community, against democracy, against the common good."
- Hungary
  - Prime Minister Viktor Orbán said that Hungary was "not going to interfere in what's going on in America right now, that's their own business", although he expressed condolences to the families of those killed in the attack. He also accused his political opposition of having "resorted to the use of violence in Hungary as well" and of having previously "besieged the Parliament building".
  - Katalin Novák, the concurrent family minister in Orbán's government, described the scene as "shocking" and said that "#Democracy should be safeguarded before, during and after the elections all over the world."
- Iceland
  - President Guðni Th. Jóhannesson reiterated his congratulations to President-elect Joe Biden and quoted "1000 year old wisdom from Althing," the world's oldest surviving parliament, saying "If we tear the law apart we tear peace apart."
  - Former President Ólafur Ragnar Grímsson said that even though much of the responsibility for the attack rested with US President Trump, it would be misleading to put all blame on him, and reiterated his belief that Trump was not the disease but rather a symptom.
  - Prime Minister Katrín Jakobsdóttir called the events "an attack on democracy" and "disturbing scenes of violence". She also said, "Liberty, democracy and decency must be respected," and blamed Trump for inciting the attack.
  - Foreign Minister Guðlaugur Þór Þórðarson observed "Shocking scenes in #WashingtonDC. Any attacks on #democratic institutions and undermining of rule of law should be condemned. Outcome of democratic elections must be respected."
- Ireland
  - Taoiseach Micheál Martin said that "many, like me, will be watching the scenes unfolding in Washington DC with great concern and dismay."
  - Minister for Foreign Affairs Simon Coveney said on Twitter that "we must call this out for what it is: a deliberate assault on Democracy by a sitting President & his supporters, attempting to overturn a free & fair election! The world is watching! We hope for restoration of calm."
  - Minister for Further and Higher Education Simon Harris called the event "an attack on democracy – pure and simple".
- Italy – Prime Minister Giuseppe Conte said he "follow(s) with great concern what is happening in Washington. Violence is incompatible with the exercise of political rights and democratic freedoms. I trust in the solidity and strength of the Institutions of the United States."
- Lithuania – Prime Minister Ingrida Šimonytė called the events "sad", but is confident that "democracy will overcome".
- Luxembourg
  - Prime Minister Xavier Bettel called the events "a heinous attack on the foundations of democracy and the freedom of press".
  - Foreign minister Jean Asselborn said Trump was "a political pyromaniac who must be put before a criminal court". Asselborn and top European Union officials refused to meet American secretary of state Mike Pompeo. In Brussels, Pompeo was due to have a private dinner with NATO Secretary-General Jens Stoltenberg on 13 January 2021 evening at Stoltenberg's private residence, before meeting Belgian Foreign Minister Sophie Wilmes. A diplomatic source said allies were 'embarrassed' by Pompeo. Pompeo cancelled a planned visit to Luxembourg, Belgium and the EU.
- Malta – Speaker of the House of Representatives Angelo Farrugia condemned the attack and expressed solidarity with the US House of Representatives. His comments were backed by the MPs Carmelo Mifsud Bonnici and Glenn Bedingfield.
- Netherlands – Prime Minister Mark Rutte called the events "horrible" and encouraged Trump to recognise Joe Biden's election win "today".
- Norway – Prime Minister Erna Solberg called the events "unbelievable" and a "totally unacceptable attack on democracy".
- Poland
  - President Andrzej Duda tweeted that the situation was an "internal matter of the United States" and that Poland had "full confidence in the power of American democracy".
  - Foreign Minister Zbigniew Rau said that a "strong Europe needed a strong America" and "US democracy was always empowered by values and upheld by institutions, enabling it to overcome even the most daunting challenges."
- Portugal – Prime Minister António Costa said, "I am following developments in #Washington with concern. Disturbing scenes. The outcome of the elections must be respected, with a peaceful and orderly transfer of power. I have trust in the strength of the democratic institutions in the #USA."
- Romania – The Ministry of Foreign Affairs labeled the events as "concerning and unacceptable" via a message on Twitter on January 7. It expressed confidence in American democracy, "which should remain a world model", and said it hoped that the situation would de-escalate soon. Other prominent Romanian politicians such as Dan Barna, Dacian Cioloș and Marcel Ciolacu also commented on the events, criticizing the attack and evoking comparisons to Romania's chaotic Mineriads of the 1990s.
- Russia
  - President Vladimir Putin did not publicly comment on the attack until June 2021, during an NBC News interview ahead of that month's summit in Geneva. During the interview, he said that the insurrectionists had arrived at the Capitol "with political demands", and criticized the arrest and detention of those involved in the attack as "persecution for political opinions". He additionally described the killing of Ashli Babbitt as an "assassination".
  - Deputy Chairman of the Security Council Dmitry Medvedev condemned the attack on the US Capitol, describing it as "a tragedy, which cannot be justified", while on the other hand calling it a "retribution for the Americans' traditional support of various riots, known as color revolutions, which led to illegitimate toppling of governments in other countries".
  - Russian Foreign Ministry spokeswoman Maria Zakharova described the situation as an "internal U.S. affair". She went on to condemn the U.S. electoral system for the situation, saying it was "archaic, it does not meet modern democratic standards, creating opportunities for numerous violations, and the American media have become an instrument of political struggle."
  - Chairman of the Foreign Affairs Committee of the Federation Council Konstantin Kosachev stated "The celebration of democracy is over. This is, alas, actually the bottom, I say this without a hint of gloating. America is no longer charting the course, and therefore has lost all its rights to set it. And especially to impose it on others."
  - Deputy Russian Ambassador to the UN Dmitry Polyanskiy said "Quite Maidan-style pictures are coming from DC."
  - Mikhail Gorbachev, the last leader of the Soviet Union, said "the storming of the capitol was clearly planned in advance, and it's obvious by whom," without clarifying to whom he was referring. He also said that the attack "called into question the future fate of the United States as a nation".
- Slovakia
  - President Zuzana Čaputová tweeted "The scenes from the US Capitol show how dangerous the rhetoric of hatred is. ... Contempt for democratic institutions erodes citizens' rights and can undermine political order. I trust the democratic and peaceful process will be restored soon."
  - Prime Minister Igor Matovič released a statement that the Capitol "is the symbol of democracy and its constitutional role must be respected in all times, under all circumstances". and "That is what the rule of law is about.
- Slovenia – Prime Minister Janez Janša tweeted "All should be very troubled by the violence taking place in Washington [and] we hope American democracy is resilient, deeply rooted and will overcome this crisis. Democracy presupposes peaceful protest, but violence and death threats – from Left or Right – are ALWAYS wrong."
- Spain
  - Prime Minister Pedro Sánchez said he was "following with concern the news [but trusts] in the strength of American democracy." Following the confirmation of Joe Biden, he said, "Yesterday's attack on Capitol Hill has only succeeded in reaffirming the principles we share. Spain will work with the United States for a more just world and the triumph of democracy over extremism."
  - President of the Congress of the Deputies Meritxell Batet addressed a letter to House Speaker Nancy Pelosi, which she posted on Twitter, to "transmit, in my name and in the name of the Spanish Congress, our solidarity and support for #USCongress after the assault last Wednesday."
- Sweden
  - Prime Minister Stefan Löfven called the protests an "assault on democracy" and hoped for a peaceful restoration of order, noting that President Trump and members of congress have "a great responsibility" for the ongoing events.
  - Foreign Minister Ann Linde said she was "deeply worried" and urged Trump to "admit defeat and acknowledge the election result."
- Switzerland
  - President Guy Parmelin tweeted that the Federal Council in Bern was "dismayed by the events" and said that "American democracy is precious" to the Swiss Confederation and its citizens as both countries share its values.
  - Vice President Ignazio Cassis said, "Freedom, democracy and national cohesion are high goods" and condemned any attack on them.
  - Swiss diplomat Livia Leu Agosti told U.S. embassy in Switzerland representative the concern about the violence.
  - Presidents of the Federal Assembly, Andreas Aebi (President of the National Council) and Alex Kuprecht (President of the Council of States) called the attack unacceptable.
- United Kingdom
  - Prime Minister Boris Johnson called the scenes "disgraceful", saying that "the United States stands for democracy around the world and it is now vital that there should be a peaceful and orderly transfer of power." He condemned Trump for his role, stating: "I think what President Trump has been saying about that has been completely wrong. I unreservedly condemn encouraging people to behave in the disgraceful way that they did in the Capitol."
  - Chancellor of the Exchequer Rishi Sunak said that "in any democracy the peaceful transition of power is just as important as the vote itself" and that "there is no excuse for the deplorable scenes coming from the US Capitol."
  - Foreign Secretary Dominic Raab said there could be "no justification [for] violent attempts to frustrate the lawful and proper transition of power".
  - Home Secretary Priti Patel accused Trump of provoking the attack, saying, "His comments directly led to the violence and so far he has failed to condemn that violence – that is completely wrong."
  - Scotland – First Minister of Scotland Nicola Sturgeon said, "The scenes from the Capitol are utterly horrifying." She called for "solidarity with those in US on the side of democracy and the peaceful and constitutional transfer of power".
  - Wales – First Minister of Wales Mark Drakeford said, "The peaceful transition of power is central to every democracy" and that it was "[d]eeply concerning to see the scenes of violence in Washington DC"
  - Northern Ireland – Deputy First Minister of Northern Ireland Michelle O'Neill said, "Those involved in these shameful attacks will not succeed. Hope and unity will triumph over fear and division."
- Ukraine – Foreign Minister Dmytro Kuleba said, "Concerning scenes in Washington, D.C. I'm confident American democracy will overcome this challenge. The rule of law & democratic procedures need to be restored as soon as possible. This is important not only for the U.S., but for Ukraine and the entire democratic world as well."

=== North America ===
- Antigua and Barbuda – Sir Ronald Sanders, Ambassador to the United States and Organization of American States, told the Miami Herald "What's happening in the United States is a complete violation of every democratic norm and also of the rule of law in a flagrant attempt to remain in power. Had that occurred in any developing country, indeed in any country of the world, the United States would have been the first to roundly condemn those people, to apply sanctions against those countries and to take action." He further wrote that Trump "openly encouraged a mob to ... carry out what was no less than a coup d'état."
- Bahamas – Minister of Foreign Affairs Darren Henfield described the event as an "insurrection” and said America "will find its way".
- Belize – The government of Belize condemned the attack and urged the United States government to "ensure a peaceful and lawful transfer of power as constitutionally mandated and which reflects the will of the people freely expressed in free and fair elections".
- Canada
  - Prime Minister Justin Trudeau noted that Canada was watching the situation "minute by minute" on the afternoon of January 6. He later called it "an attack on democracy" and said that "violence will never succeed in overruling the will of the people. Democracy in the U.S. must be upheld – and it will be." Trudeau laid blame for the attack on Donald Trump, who he said helped incite the mob. He also stated, "Democracy is not automatic. It takes work everyday."
  - Foreign Minister François-Philippe Champagne said in a tweet that "The peaceful transition of power is fundamental to democracy – it must continue and it will."
  - Alberta – Premier of Alberta Jason Kenney said the province "has always had close ties to the United States, so it's painful to watch the bizarre scenes unfolding at the U.S. Capitol today."
  - British Columbia – Premier of British Columbia John Horgan tweeted that "Intimidation cannot be permitted to disrupt democratic institutions," with a small but violent pro-Trump protest also breaking out in the province.
  - Manitoba – Premier of Manitoba Brian Pallister tweeted: “Respect for the democratic process and the peaceful transition of power is a cornerstone of democracy - as Canadians, we deeply value that. Our thoughts are with those who work in the US Capitol for their safety and for a quick de-escalation of the disturbing situation unfolding.”
  - Nova Scotia – Premier of Nova Scotia Stephen McNeil said in a news conference from Halifax the day after the attack that he was "shocked" by the scenes that took place at the Capitol and placed the blame on Trump for inciting the attack. He added: "we, as a global community, need a democratic America, one that respects the rule of law in order for all of us to continue to have safety" and was grateful that Biden's victory was ultimately certified by Mike Pence.
  - Ontario – Premier of Ontario Doug Ford said in a written statement that "The situation in Washington is absolutely disgraceful. The peaceful transfer of power is crucial to any democracy and I'm incredibly disappointed with what we are witnessing in the United States today."
  - Quebec – Premier of Québec François Legault tweeted in French that the event was "a dark day for American democracy".
  - Saskatchewan – Premier of Saskatchewan Scott Moe tweeted that the events were "deeply disturbing" and "an affront to the democratic values that we hold sacred".
- Costa Rica – The Ministry of Foreign Affairs and Worship said, "We are following closely the unfolding events and we trust the solid and democratic institutions of the United States of America, as well as the respect of the rule of law."
- Cuba – Minister of Foreign Affairs, Bruno Rodríguez Parrilla, wrote on Twitter: "We reject the serious acts of violence and vandalism perpetrated at the US Congress yesterday. They are an expression of the crisis of the system and a result of long-lasting exclusion, manipulation and political irresponsibility and instigation of hatred."
- Dominican Republic – The External Relations Ministry said in a Twitter post that "the Dominican Government condemns the acts of violence that occurred this afternoon in the U.S Capitol, contrary to the country's long democratic tradition. We make the strongest call for an end of violence and for the peaceful transition of power."
- Jamaica – Foreign Affairs Minister Kamina Johnson-Smith said in a Twitter post that "We note with deep concern today's developments in Washington D.C. We continue to follow the events and trust that there will be a prompt return to normalcy in this important neighbour and democracy in the Western Hemisphere."
- Mexico – President Andrés Manuel López Obrador stated "conflicts should be resolved peacefully" and that "We're not going to intervene in these matters, which are up to the Americans to resolve, to deal with. That's our policy, that's what I can say." However, he criticized Twitter and Facebook for blocking Trump's accounts.
- Trinidad and Tobago – The Minister of Foreign and CARICOM Affairs said, "It is sad and disturbing to witness these scenes of chaos and near-insurrection in Washington DC. I have been in touch with our Embassy staff in that city, and have encouraged our Ambassador and the entire team to stay safe and off the streets."
- Panama – the Panamanian Chancellor, Erika Mouynes, lamented the situation, classifying it as "acts of violence" and calling for "democratic values to prevail to safeguard the institutionality and respect the rule of law".

=== Oceania ===
- Australia
  - Prime Minister Scott Morrison released a statement on Twitter calling the scenes "very distressing" and saying: "We condemn these acts of violence and look forward to a peaceful transfer of Government to the newly elected administration in the great American democratic tradition." However, he declined to condemn Trump's remarks, saying that he did not comment on leaders of friendly countries "out of respect for those nations" and expressed "hope" that Trump's supporters would follow his advice to return home.
  - Deputy Prime Minister Michael McCormack condemned the attack and compared the situation as "similar" to the summer race riots in the U.S. He described Trump's Twitter remarks as "unfortunate" and expressed his disapproval "that a decision that has been made by the American people hasn't been accepted by [Trump]", but he criticized the subsequent banning of Trump from social media platforms: "I'm not one who believes in that sort of censorship."
  - Foreign Minister Marise Payne condemned the violence.
  - Treasurer Josh Frydenberg said he was "uncomfortable" with social media restrictions placed on Trump following the attack, saying that "Freedom of speech is fundamental to our society."
- Fiji – Prime Minister Frank Bainimarama said, "The violent scenes we saw in Washington today are an affront to democracies around the globe. True and genuine democracy is a precious treasure that no nation should ever take for granted. We are confident the USA will soon close this ugly chapter once and for all."
- Micronesia – President David Panuelo said in a letter that "The People and Government of the Federated States of Micronesia woke up this morning of January 7th, 2021, to watch in abject horror as President Donald J. Trump openly solicited acts of domestic terrorism against the People and Government of the United States of America."
- New Zealand
  - Prime Minister Jacinda Ardern said "What is happening is wrong [and that] the right of people to exercise a vote, have their voice heard and then have that decision upheld peacefully should never be undone by a mob. [...] I have no doubt democracy will prevail."
  - Foreign Minister Nanaia Mahuta tweeted a statement saying the country "look[s] forward to the peaceful transition of the political administration".
- Palau – After the flag of Palau was seen in videos of the attack shared on social media, the Ambassador of Palau to the United States, Hersey Kyota, said that "Peaceful demonstrations are part of democracy, and every person has the right to speak up and participate in that process. This includes thousands of Palauans and Americans of Palauan heritage who call America home. However, the flag of the Republic of Palau has no place in the disorder and unlawful act that took place at the U.S. Capitol."

=== South America ===
- Argentina – President Alberto Fernández condemned the "serious events of violence and the overrunning of the Congress that occurred today in Washington." He further stated that he "trusts that there will be a peaceful transition that respects the popular will and we express our firmest support to President-elect Joe Biden".
- Bolivia
  - President of the Senate Andrónico Rodríguez expressed his surprise at what happened in the United States, a country which "supposedly expresses the greatest democratic spirit in the world" and said Donald Trump is a "politician with a lot of ambition for power [who] puts his country to international shame".
  - Former President Evo Morales decried the Trump administration for "putting into practice a self-coup to stay in power", claiming that it "promotes racist and fascist violence and is not interested in democracy".
  - Former President Carlos Mesa affirmed that the "shameful action of President Trump can be classified as an attempt by the Executive branch to strike a blow at the electoral system and the Legislative branch."
  - Former President Jorge Quiroga called the events "scandalous and surreal" and an "unconstitutional action [which] borders on coup". Quiroga further claimed that the attack showed a "sad end of President Trump and a profound deterioration of the democratic image of his country".
- Brazil
  - President Jair Bolsonaro did not condemn the attack, affirming that he is "connected to Trump". Furthermore, Bolsonaro affirmed that there were "a lot of fraud reports" in the U.S. election. He also baselessly claimed that the 2018 Brazilian general election was fraudulent, declaring that he "was supposed to have been elected in the first round".
  - Foreign Minister Ernesto Araújo initially declined to condemn the situation, saying that "It must be recognized that a large part of the American people feels assaulted and betrayed by their political class and distrust the electoral process." He emphasized the "right to demand the proper functioning of their institutions is sacred" and argued the violence was "not an excuse, in the US or in any country, to put any institution above popular scrutiny". Following backlash on social media, he condemned the attack, but suggested that the mob had been "infiltrated" and called for an investigation into the deaths of those killed, including the individual shot by police.
  - President of the Chamber of Deputies Rodrigo Maia said: "Today's serious episode in the United States only increases our responsibility to keep the Chamber of Deputies in Brazil independent."
  - Justice of the Supreme Federal Court and President of the Superior Electoral Court Luís Roberto Barroso tweeted "In this sad episode in the U.S., supporters of fascism showed their real face: anti-democratic and aggressive." He also tweeted that he hoped "American society and institutions react with vigor to this threat to democracy".
- Chile – President Sebastián Piñera said, "Chile rejects actions aimed at altering the democratic process in the United States and condemns violence and undue interference with constitutional institutions. Chile relies on the strength of US democracy to guarantee the rule of law and of the state."
- Colombia – President Iván Duque said, "we reject the acts of violence seen today during the Electoral College vote counting in the United States Congress and I express my solidarity and support to the honorable members of Congress and to all US institutions."
- Ecuador – The Ecuadorian foreign ministry expressed concern and called for all parties to stay calm, be peaceful, and respect democracy.
- Peru – The Ministry of Foreign Affairs repudiated the attack and stressed the importance of respecting the electoral process.
- Uruguay – In a short tweet, President Luis Lacalle Pou expressed his "deepest rejection of the acts of violence that occurred today in the United States Congress, trusting that the democratic values of that nation will prevail against any attempt to undermine its institutions".
- Venezuela
  - Juan Guaidó (Note: Disputed acting President of Venezuela. See Venezuelan presidential crisis) condemned the attack, declaring that "the attack to the US Capitol is to democracy" and adding that "the strength of democracy lays in the institutional independence and solidity, its social fabric vigor and citizen's awareness."
  - Foreign Minister Jorge Arreaza condemned "the political polarization and the spiral of violence that reflects the profound political and social crisis the United States is currently experiencing". A statement from the Venezuelan Foreign Ministry said "with this pitiful episode, the US is suffering exactly what it has caused in other countries with its aggressive policies. Venezuela hopes these violent events will soon cease and that the US people will finally be able to find a new path towards stability and social justice."

== Intergovernmental and international organizations ==
- ASEAN – Chair of ASEAN Parliamentarians for Human Rights Charles Santiago said that Trump had joined other world leaders "in subverting democracy and will of the people".
- Commonwealth of Nations – Secretary-General Patricia Scotland said "I was deeply shocked and saddened to see the violence last night in the American capital, there is no place for it in a free and democratic society. However, it is heartening to see that democracy and the rule of law has prevailed."
- European Union – EU High Representative for Foreign Affairs Josep Borrell said, "In the eyes of the world, American democracy tonight appears under siege. This is an unseen assault on US democracy, its institutions and the rule of law. This is not America."
  - European Council – President of the European Council Charles Michel said that "The US Congress is a temple of democracy. To witness tonight's scenes in #WashingtonDC is a shock. We trust the US to ensure a peaceful transfer of power to Joe Biden."
  - European Commission – President of the European Commission Ursula von der Leyen said, "I believe in the strength of US institutions and democracy. Peaceful transition of power is at the core."
- NATO – Secretary General Jens Stoltenberg called the scenes at the U.S. Capitol "shocking" on Twitter, and said, "The outcome of this democratic election must be respected."
- Organization of American States – The OAS declared that "The exercise of force and vandalism against the institutions constitutes a serious attack against democratic functioning. We urge a return to much-needed rationality and a conclusion of the electoral process in accordance with the Constitution and the corresponding institutional procedures."
- Parlatino – The Latin American Parliament condemned the attack, with Parlatino President Jorge Pizarro saying that "democracy and national self-determination are fundamental values that should prevail in our countries."
- United Nations
  - Secretary-General António Guterres was "saddened by the events at the US Capitol in Washington, D.C., on Wednesday" and said, "In such circumstances, it is important that political leaders impress on their followers the need to refrain from violence, as well as to respect democratic processes and the rule of law."
  - President of the General Assembly Volkan Bozkir said he was "saddened and concerned" by the events and said he believes "peace and respect for the democratic processes will prevail in our host country at this critical time."
  - Director-General of the World Health Organization Tedros Adhanom said "I'm thinking of my many friends in the USA & while deeply saddened by the events I also remain confident in the country's spirit & resilience. Tonight I wish for peace & solidarity 'from sea to shining sea.'"
  - UN High Commissioner for Human Rights Michelle Bachelet released a statement calling for an investigation, saying that her office was "deeply troubled" by the attack. She also condemned attacks on journalists and "call[ed] on leaders from across the political spectrum, including the President of the United States, to disavow false and dangerous narratives".
- Islamic State of Iraq and the Levant – Al-Naba, the group's official publication, praised the attack "during a meeting of the tyrants" as "great". The organisation speculated that internal strife in the U.S. would lead the country to dedicate fewer resources to fighting international terrorist groups.

== Political parties and organizations ==
=== Africa ===
- Tunisia – The centrist Mashrou Tounes party leader Mohsen Marzouk said, "Populism is a dangerous disease which can cause serious damage even in the most ancient of democracies," and that the takeaway for Tunisia was the importance of responsibility in public affairs.

=== Asia ===
- Israel – Opposition Leader and leader of the centrist Yesh Atid party, Yair Lapid, said he was "deeply saddened and shocked" by the violence at the United States Capitol and that he hopes "to see order restored and the transition of power completed ..."
- Lebanon – Secretary-General of Hezbollah Hassan Nasrallah remarked that the events there "deserved to be pondered and mused over in a bid to clarify what is really going on in the US and to discern the truth behind the claims of democracy in that country".
- Malaysia – Leader of the opposition and President of the People's Justice Party Anwar Ibrahim condemned the violence and criticized Trump for his "insightful [recte inciteful] language and war-like rhetoric".
- Republic of China (Taiwan) – Former President and Former Kuomintang Chairman Ma Ying-jeou has criticized Taiwanese President Tsai Ing-Wen and Premier Su Tseng-chang for remaining silent on the attack, warning that it might cause the incoming Biden administration to think that Tsai condones the violence.

=== Europe ===
- Austria – Freedom Party of Austria leader Norbert Hofer condemned the situation, saying "Rallies must not be used to violently try to fight democratically legitimised decisions." He compared it to protests outside the Austrian Parliament in 2000 against the inclusion of the Freedom Party in the coalition government.
- Denmark – Danish People's Party leader Kristian Thulesen Dahl said the certification of Biden's electoral victory "must be respected" and the rioters "must be stopped and held accountable". He added that "The vast majority of US citizens do not want violence and trouble in the streets. Do not let the few who do not know the boundaries stand as the image of Americans."
- Finland – Finns Party leader Jussi Halla-aho condemned "illegal activity everywhere" and praised the resilience of U.S. institutions but downplayed the situation, claiming, "We've seen this kind of brawling and rioting also in other parts of the world."
- France
  - Marine Le Pen, leader of the National Rally, said that "any act of violence that aims to undermine the democratic process is unacceptable, and I was very shocked at the images on Capitol Hill," but criticised restrictions placed on Trump's social media accounts following the events: "Censorship by digital giants raises questions, including in France."
  - Jean-Luc Mélenchon, leader of La France Insoumise, tweeted in French his "unconditional support for parliamentarians [in the United States, and that], the far right must be pushed back and suppressed in the US, and its connections [throughout] the world [need to be] put out of harm's way."
- Germany
  - Alternative for Germany co-leader Tino Chrupalla affirmed his party's commitment to democracy as the "foremost political goal" and said, "Anyone who violently attacks parliaments aims at the heart of Democracy" both in Germany and in the United States. The other co-leader, Jörg Meuthen, called the situation "frightening, disturbing and completely out of the question" and declared his party "rejects any form of violence and anarchy". However, he rejected comparisons made by the German president between the Capitol attack and the occupation of the steps of the Reichstag building by anti-lockdown protesters in August.
- Ireland – Sinn Féin leader and Leader of the Opposition Mary Lou McDonald lambasted the "shameful scenes", which she described as a "direct attack on democracy and the peaceful transfer of power."
- Italy – Opposition Leader and leader of Lega Nord Matteo Salvini said violence is "never the solution" and "Long live Freedom and Democracy, always and everywhere." He said that although he had ideological sympathy for Trump and the Republican Party, "a legitimate vote is one thing, going to parliament and clashing with the police is quite a different matter. That's not political vision, that's madness."
- Netherlands – Party for Freedom leader Geert Wilders, who has expressed support for Trump in the past, tweeted his opposition to the attack and stated "The rule of law is stronger than violence. America stands for liberty and freedom, and democracy will always prevail. And the outcome of democratic elections should always be respected, whether you win or lose."
- Russia – Liberal Democratic Party of Russia leader Vladimir Zhirinovsky praised Trump following the situation, tweeting, "Be brave Donald. We're with you, you'll get help from abroad."
- Spain – Vox leader Santiago Abascal called for the restoration of order and said, "Western democracies have to show their strength against the revolutionary processes that the elites have stupidly promoted." He also accused Deputy Prime Minister Pablo Iglesias of advocating for storming the Spanish Congress of Deputies, and the Catalan government of attacking the Parliament of Catalonia.
- Sweden
  - Moderate Party leader Ulf Kristersson wrote that the event was an "assault on the American democracy and Constitution" and further commented that "The outgoing president Donald Trump is responsible for the hatred, agitation and violence."
  - Sweden Democrats leader Jimmie Åkesson said Trump's handling of the election loss and the attack "confirmed what both I and many others have suspected, that he lacks many of the qualities that we normally ascribe to humanity," while clarifying that he would still have preferred a Republican victory in the election.
- Switzerland – FDP.The Liberals politician Christa Markwalder, chair of the parliamentary group "friendship Switzerland–U.S." and former President of the National Council, called the storm "shocking".
- United Kingdom
  - Labour Party leader and Leader of the Opposition Keir Starmer called the scenes "horrendous" and said "these are not 'protestors' – this is a direct attack on democracy."
  - Brexit Party founder and former UKIP leader Nigel Farage, a long-time Trump ally, denounced the protest and said, "Storming Capitol Hill is wrong. The protesters must leave."
  - Susan Hall, the leader of the London Conservatives, and Andrew R. T. Davies, the former leader of the Welsh Conservative Party, compared the attack to other British politicians' opposition to Brexit.

=== North America ===
- Canada
  - Erin O'Toole, leader of the Official Opposition and the Conservative Party of Canada, called the event an "astonishing assault on freedom and democracy".
  - Yves-François Blanchet, leader of the Bloc Québécois, tweeted in French that the event "will certainly allow the benevolent majority of Americans to see that [Trump and his] ideology have not served them".
  - Jagmeet Singh, leader of the New Democratic Party, called the event frightening, and blamed President Donald Trump for inciting the attack. Singh then launched a petition demanding that the Canadian government designate the Proud Boys as a terrorist organisation due to their role in the attack.
  - Annamie Paul, leader of the Green Party of Canada, tweeted, saying of the event that "Moments such as these underscore the importance of respect for the rule of law and the peaceful transfer of power – principles upon which any healthy democracy depends."
- El Salvador – The Nationalist Republican Alliance condemned the incident, called it a "grave attack against democracy", and compared it to the 2020 Salvadoran political crisis, in which President Nayib Bukele ordered soldiers into the Legislative Assembly of El Salvador.

=== Oceania ===
- Australia – Opposition Leader and federal leader of the Australian Labor Party Anthony Albanese said, "Democracy is precious and cannot be taken for granted – the violent insurrection in Washington is an assault on the rule of law and democracy."
- New Zealand – Opposition Leader and leader of the New Zealand National Party Judith Collins stated "What we are seeing in the US is a disgraceful attack on democracy. The [National Party] supports the peaceful and orderly transition of power."

== Far-right groups ==
The attack was celebrated by far-right and fascist groups around the world, with rioter Ashli Babbitt being commemorated as a martyr by some British and Russian neo-Nazis. The Nordic Resistance Movement condemned Trump for allegedly betraying the rioters by being insufficiently supportive of them.

== Media coverage ==
WNBC reported that media outlets around the world reacted to the attack, with newspapers from both the left and the right condemning the behavior of Trump and his supporters.

British newspaper i described the attack as "Anarchy in the USA", with the sub-heading: "Trump incites thousands of protestors to storm the Capitol, saying 'We will never concede'". British newspaper The Times ran the headline: "U.S. Capitol under siege". Both newspapers, among others, featured a photograph of armed Capitol Police officers barricading the door to the chamber of the House of Representatives. British television news channel Sky News led their coverage of the attack with deaths and arrests, running the headline: "Riot at US Capitol: Four dead as outrage grows over Trump-inspired mob's storming of Congress", as well as detailing that 52 arrests had been made related to the attack.

French newspaper Le Monde led their coverage with Capitol Police regaining full control over the Capitol building, noting that "security was no longer threatened" and also noted "'Enough is enough': After the invasion of the Capitol, Republicans close to Trump are turning their backs on him". French newspaper Le Figaro's live blog on the front page of its website led with then-Senate Majority Leader Mitch McConnell saying "Congress will not be intimidated."

German newspaper Frankfurter Allgemeine Zeitung ran the headline: "Republicans in shock", with a lead noting that "for many Republicans, the moment seems to have come when they no longer want to defend Donald Trump."

Russian news outlets led with mass coverage of "political crisis in the United States", as Russian tabloid Komsomolskaya Pravda put it. Russian government-owned newspaper Rossiyskaya Gazeta led with online rolling coverage on the "chaos" in Washington, D.C. next to a comment from Konstantin Kosachev, Chairman of the Foreign Affairs Committee of the Federation Council, saying that the attack "showed that American democracy was limping on both legs and the United States lost the right to impose a course on other countries." Russian newspaper Izvestia led its coverage with the headline: "Once upon a time in America: how Donald Trump drove the crowd to frenzy", with a lead stating that "Party members began to turn away from the current president amid the outbreak of violence in Washington."

In China, the Communist Party's newspaper, the People's Daily, had little coverage of the attack on their website's homepage. However, the Global Times, a Chinese tabloid newspaper run by the People's Daily, headlined its website with "Chinese netizens jeer riot in U.S. Capitol as 'Karma,' say bubbles of 'democracy and freedom' have burst", with the article saying that "words like 'Karma,' 'retribution' and 'deserving' were frequently mentioned in Chinese netizens' comments when they saw the latest episode of the U.S.' real version of House of Cards." State media drew parallels between the attack and the 2019–2020 Hong Kong protests.

The West Australian reported that "Newspapers around the world have reacted to the ugly scenes that marred Joe Biden's certification as the next US president", including coverage from Brazilian newspaper Folha de S.Paulo, the Ottawa Sun in Canada, Saudi Arabian newspaper Arab News and the Nigerian Tribune. CNN similarly paid tribute to several newspapers worldwide which ran images, headlines, and articles describing the attack on their front pages.

In November 2025, allegations by The Daily Telegraph that the BBC had deliberately spliced a Donald Trump speech preceding the January 6th United States Capitol attack in a documentary led to several BBC executives resigning, including the head of the BBC.

== See also ==
- Domestic reactions to the January 6 United States Capitol attack
