= Japanese settlement in Palau =

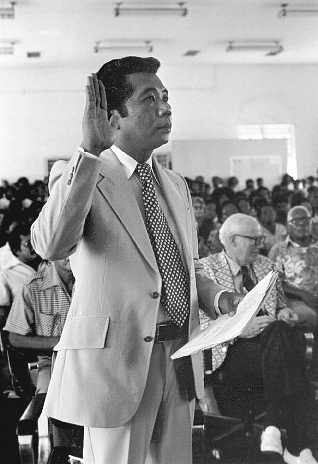
Mamoru Nakamura

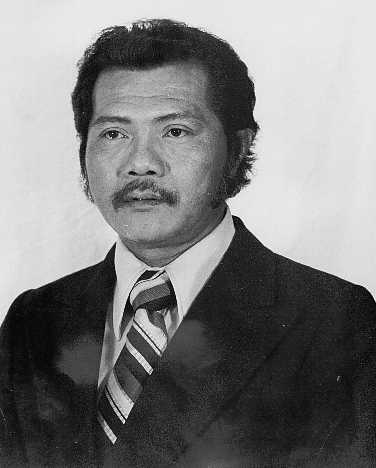
Luke Tman (Note: Luke Masaharu Tman (1938–2009) was born to a Japanese father, Kyota Masaharu a native of Yokohama and his Palauan wife. He was adopted by Elias Figir, a Yapese man at a young age, where he was raised up and given the name of "Tman". He later became involved in the politics of the Federated States of Micronesia (specifically Yap), rather than in Palau. Tman was fluent in Palauan, Yapese and conversant in Japanese and English. One of his brothers, Shiro Kyota, became the speaker of Palau's congress.)

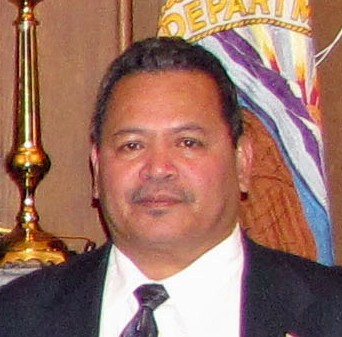
Hersey Kyota

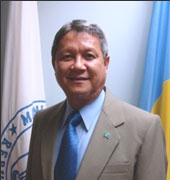
Elias Camsek Chin

Total population
- 300 (2009) (Note: Figure excludes Palauan citizens of mixed Japanese-Palauan heritage.)

Regions with significant populations
- Angaur, Koror

Languages
- Palauan, English, Japanese

Religion
- Roman Catholicism and Protestantism Shintoism and Buddhism

Related ethnic groups
- Palauans, Japanese, Okinawans

There is a small Japanese community in the Pacific Island country of Palau, which mainly consists of Japanese expatriates residing in Palau over a long-term basis. A few Japanese expatriates started to reside in Palau after it gained independence in 1994, and established long-term businesses in the country. Japanese settlement in Palau dates back to the early 19th century, although large scale Japanese migration to Palau did not occur until the 1920s, when Palau came under Japanese rule and administered as part of the South Seas Mandate. Japanese settlers took on leading administrative roles in the Japanese colonial government, and developed Palau's economy. After the Japanese surrender in 1945, virtually all of the Japanese population was repatriated back to Japan, although people of mixed Japanese-Palauan descent were allowed to remain behind. People of Japanese-Palauan descent constitute a large minority of Palau's population as a result of substantial intermarriage between the Japanese settlers and Palauans.

== History ==
=== Early years (1820–1945) ===
The first recorded account of Japanese contact in Palau occurred in 1820, when a coastal sailing ship was blown off course and eight surviving men spent five years in Palau until 1825. Japanese traders began to establish settlements from the mid-19th century onwards, and by 1890 two Japanese trading stations had been established. Many of these traders married the daughters of local chieftains and raised local families. When Japan annexed Palau from Germany in 1914, Japanese settlers and their descendants acted as state liaison officials and interpreters for the Japanese military administration.

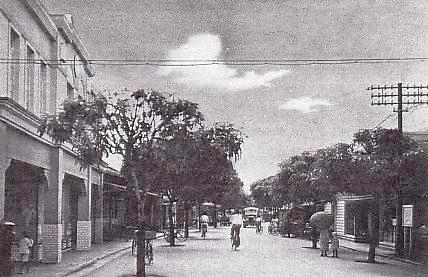
Koror during the Japanese administration

Under the South Seas Mandate, a civilian government was established on April 1, 1922, with its headquarters at Koror, replacing the military administration. The civilian government initiated a programme to identify and collectivise unused land between 1923 and 1932 for redevelopment. Much of this land was used to build new industrial estates and expand towns to accommodate immigrants from Japan and Okinawa. In Japan, the government actively encouraged the Japanese and Okinawans to resettle in Micronesia, including Palau, and began establishing farming settlements. The first farming settlement was established at Ngaremlengui in 1926, but the settlers encountered problems with its humid tropical environment and abandoned it by 1930, although later settlements were established more successfully.

As the Great Depression resulted in massive unemployment in the late 1920s and 1930s, more Japanese and Okinawans migrated to Palau. Immigrants brought along their families and sought employment in various professions. The Japanese immigrants held administrative posts, while the Okinawans and a few Koreans (Note: Koreans only came to Palau from the late 1930s onwards.) worked as labourers in the agricultural, fishery and mining industries. By 1935, the Japanese constituted at least 60% of Palau's population and were concentrated in urban areas such as Angaur and Koror. Some Japanese settlers took Palauan wives or mistresses, and there was a sizeable minority of mixed Japanese-Palauan (Note: Known as konketsu in Japanese.) children towards the later years of the Japanese administration.

The Japanese navy expanded their military facilities from 1937 onwards. More labourers from Japan and Korea were employed to construct the facilities to complete the facilities within a short period of time. The number of indentured labourers rose to more than 10,000 throughout Micronesia, and placed a heavy strain on the islands' scarce resources. Many Okinawan and Japanese labourers and permanent settlers were repatriated back to their homeland. Japanese men were conscripted into regular services, and Palauans who held administrative posts in the police force were reallocated jobs in the agricultural sector. The Japanese civilians played an important role in the islands' propaganda activities. As food resources were cut off from Japan, many Japanese encountered greater difficulties in dealing with starvation than their Palauan counterparts, who were more knowledgeable with tropical survival skills.

=== Postwar years (1945–present) ===
Following the Surrender of Japan to the Allied forces, Japanese military personnel and civilians were repatriated to Japan between 1945 and 1946, although some 350 labourers and technicians were permitted to remain behind to carry out repair works to Palau's infrastructure. However, offspring of Japanese-Palauan intermarriages were allowed to remain, although a few migrated to Japan with their fathers. In the 1950s, Japanese-Palauans (Note: Led by Minoru Ueki, who was born to a Japanese father and Palauan mother himself.) formed an organisation, Sakura-kai to assist Japanese-Palauans and Japanese youths who were abandoned by their parents to search for their parents and kinsmen who were forcibly separated as a result of forced repatriation of Japanese settlers back to Japan. The organisation became a cultural organisation from the 1980s onwards, as most Japanese-Palauans had reunited with their Japanese families or voluntarily chose to leave certain family separations as they were.

Palau's interaction with Japan was kept to a minimal level during the post-war years, although Okinawan fishermen occasionally visited Palau for catches from the 1960s onwards. A few Japanese nationals resettled in Palau in the 1970s, and married local Palauans. In the 1980s, Japanese businessmen set up businesses in Palau, and by 1995 there were 218 Japanese nationals residing in Palau. Of these, about half of them expressed a desire for permanent residency in Palau and a few married Palauan or Filipino women. However, the majority brought their families from Japan along, and maintained frequent contacts with Japan. Some settlers from the 1980s also consisted of former Japanese settlers who were repatriated back to Japan after World War II. Former settlers who returned to Palau usually consisted of individuals over 60 years of age, and often worked as tour guides or restaurateurs in Palau.

Many Japanese-Palauans assumed key positions in the public service sector and politics. At least one ethnologist, Mark Peattie, suggested that the strong representation of Japanese-Palauans in leading positions in society could be attributed to the mainstream Japanese education which they had received in their youth. Palau's first president, Kuniwo Nakamura—who was half-Japanese—fostered closer diplomatic ties between Japan and Palau during his presidency. During a state visit to Japan in 1996, Emperor Akihito personally received Nakamura, and the visit was commended by Palauans and Japanese alike. Nakamura's visit prompted Japan to channel monetary aid to Palau to facilitate repair work on the Koror–Babeldaob Bridge and securing special trade agreements with Japan.

== Demographics ==
In the early years of civilian administration, the Japanese population consisted of about a few hundred individuals, and reached a little over 2,000 by 1930. The Japanese resident population increased at an exponential rate from the mid-1930s onwards, and there were about 15,000 Japanese in Palau by 1938, the vast majority of whom were concentrated in Koror. The influx of Japanese immigrants fuelled the development of Koror into a city by 1939. The Palauans were quickly outnumbered by the Japanese, and constituted only about 16 percent of the city's population in 1937. The Japanese made up more than half of the islands' population, as well as 27% of Micronesia's Japanese population in a 1938 census. A large minority of the Japanese populace consisted of Okinawan immigrants, as well as a few Koreans. (Note: Both Okinawans and Koreans are also classified as "Japanese" all official census pertaining to the South Seas Mandate.) Palau's Japanese population was repatriated after the Japanese surrender, but people of Japanese-Palauan descent remained behind and constitute a large minority of Palau's population. A study done by the Sasakawa Pacific Island Nations Fund estimated that about 10% of Palauans are born to a Japanese father and Palauan mother, the vast majority of whom were born before 1945. Another study done by the Foundation for Advanced Studies in International Development from Japan in 2005 estimates that about 25% of Palau's populace have some Japanese ancestry.

The following table shows the increase in the Japanese population in Palau throughout the Japanese colonial era:

Japanese and Palauan populations in Palau (1912–1943)
Year	Japanese	Palauans
1912	73	-
1920	592	5,700
1922	206	5,700
1925	1,054	-
1930	2,078	5,794
1931	2,489	-
1932	3,346	-
1933	3,940	-
1934	5,365	
1935	6,553	5,851
1937	11,400	-
1940	23,700	7,000
1943	27,500	-

== Language ==
During the Japanese colonial era, Japanese settlers mainly used Japanese in their daily discourse, and Japanese was the lingua franca used for communication between Japanese and Palauans. English was also recognised as a co-official language along with Japanese, and many Japanese had at least some knowledge of the language as well. People of mixed Japanese-Palauan heritage were more competent in Japanese than to Palauan, especially those who attended mainstream primary schools. The Japanese also introduced the use of the Katakana script in Palauan, which was also used in informal settings. After the Japanese surrender, the use of Japanese was discouraged in place of Palauan and English. Most Japanese-Palauans use Palauan in their daily discourse in favour of Japanese or English, although Japanese was used more frequently among Japanese-Palauans than to those that do not have Japanese ancestry. As the number of Japanese tourists increased during the 1990s, Japanese was introduced as an elective subject to Palauan schools and in elections.

The state constitution of the island of Angaur mentions English, Palauan, and Japanese as official languages, making Angaur the only place in the world where Japanese is an official language.

== Religion ==
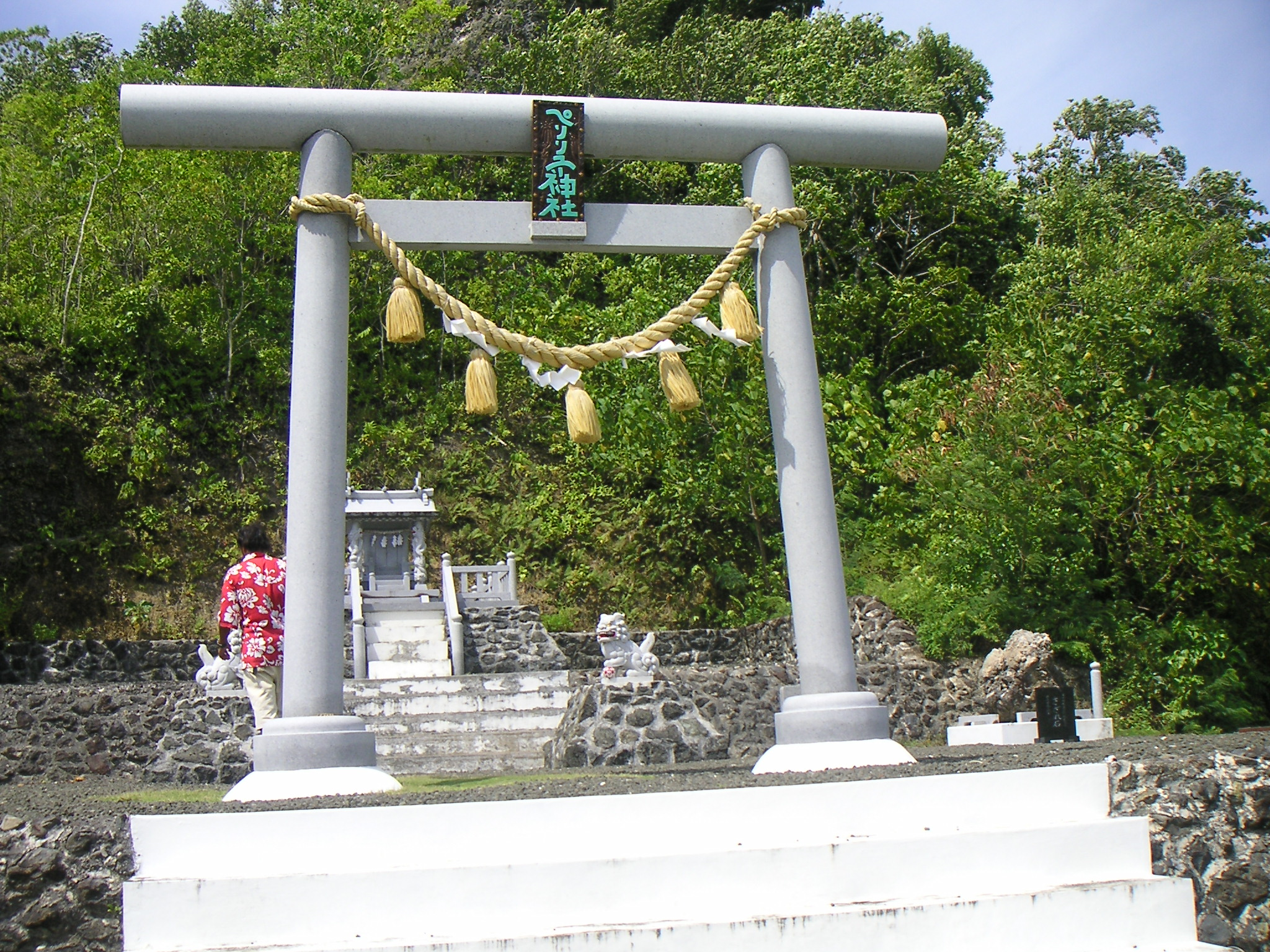
Peleliu Jinjya ("Peleliu Shrine") on Peleliu Island

State Shinto was heavily emphasised in the 1930s as means to promote Japanese nationalism and acculturalisation of Palauans to Japanese norms. A few shrines were built around Palau during the 1930s. Of particular note was the completion of the Taisha Nanyo Jinja (transliterally the Great Southern Shrine) in November 1940 at Koror, which subsequently served as the central shrine in Micronesia. Civilian participation of Shinto rituals was heavily emphasised, which focused on Japanese cultural ideals and worship of the Japanese emperor. Shinto, Zen Buddhist and Tenrikyo missions were also encouraged to establish religious missions, and the first Buddhist temple in Palau was erected in 1926, mainly to cater to the spiritual needs of the Japanese settlers. Early Japanese settlers reportedly built small Shinto shrines in agricultural colonies before the civilian government actively encouraged religious missionary activities in Palau.

Christian missions were initially given financial support by the Japanese civilian government and were encouraged to stamp out certain Animist rituals practiced by Palauans, but many were later imprisoned from the late 1930s onwards as the Japanese became suspicious of the missionaries' involvement in espionage activities. After the war, many of these shrines were abandoned or demolished, and Japanese-Palauans chose to adopt Christianity in favour of Buddhism or Shinto. In the 1980s and 1990s, miniature replicas of the Great Shinto Shrine, Peleliu and Angaur shrines were reconstructed. Unlike Shinto shrines during the Japanese colonial era, reconstructed shrines served as memorial sites for Japanese soldiers who died during the Second World War, and are visited by Japanese tourists and family members of slain soldiers.

== Society ==
=== Racial segregation ===
The Japanese civilian administration segregated the Japanese immigrants from the Palauans and adopted policies that were intended to protect the welfare of the Palauans. From the 1930s onwards, focus was later shifted towards providing more for the Japanese immigrants as the civilian administration faced difficulties in meeting the demands of an increasing immigrant population. Racial segregation was practiced in most sectors of society, but was more highly pronounced in the workforce and educational sectors. Palauans faced difficulties in getting employed in administrative positions in the workforce, which was dominated by Japanese settlers. In the educational sector, Japanese children attended mainstream primary schools (shogakko) whose lessons are based on the mainstream curriculum as with other schools on mainland Japan. Palauan children attended "public schools" (logakko) and attended lessons that focused on imparting skills for menial labour. Most students from "Public schools" dropped out after completing their elementary education and some children of Japanese fathers and Palauan mothers also faced difficulties in getting enrolled into primary schools, especially for those who were born out of wedlock.

=== Mixed-race descendants ===
During the Japanese colonial-era, a sizeable minority of mixed-race Japanese-Palauans emerged. Japanese-Palauans were offspring of intermarriages between Japanese men and Palauan women. Most of them lived in urban areas, and were brought up in accordance to Japanese norms and values and spoke Japanese in their daily lives. A few sought further education in Japan, and at the same time had limited knowledge of Palauan customs and language, although children that were born out of wedlock reportedly had a greater exposure to their matrilineal customs and spoke both Japanese and Palauan fluently. Although Japanese-Palauan children were generally classified as Japanese in official figures and had access to Japanese social privileges, many reportedly faced discrimination when placed in Japanese and Palauan circles. In rural areas where Palauans formed higher concentrations, spouses and mistresses of Japanese men were shunned upon, and Palauan nationalists (especially Modekngei) actively discouraged mixed unions between Japanese men and Palauan women. The Japanese government encouraged such intermarriages, and provided social benefits to women who had married Japanese men. However, only unions with civilian men were recognised and military personnel were prohibited from marrying Palauan women, although they were allowed to keep mistresses. The civilian government suppressed unions between Palauan men and Japanese women, and there was only one known case of a union between a Palauan man and a Japanese woman during the Japanese colonial-era.

After the Japanese surrender in 1945, Japanese settlers were repatriated back to Japan, and male Japanese settlers who had raised Japanese-Palauan families abandoned their families in favour of repatriation, reasoning that the offspring would be able to better adapt in Palau than in Japan. Many of these Palauan women raised their mixed-race children singlehandedly, while others were abandoned and adopted by Palauan families. Some Japanese-Palauan families migrated to Japan, but generally faced a cultural shock and petitioned to return to Palau after living in Japan for some years. Most petitions were allowed, although they were not allowed to bring their Japanese spouses along. (Note: There were a few exceptions to such cases. One family was allowed to bring their Japanese spouse back to Palau after the wife forced her way through to personally meet up with Douglas MacArthur, but called to repatriate to Japan after phosphate mining in Palau ceased in 1955. At the last minute, the military governor in Guam permitted him to remain.)

Second and third-generation descendants of Japanese-Palauans who were descended from earlier settlers generally chose to remain behind, although those who were raised in Japanese-speaking families reportedly faced trouble conversing in Palauan. Most retained their Japanese surnames, but Japanese-Paluans generally identified themselves as Palauans after the war. Second-generation Japanese-Palauans usually married Palauan women, and became assimilated with the local Palauan populace. In terms of self-identification, Japanese-Palauans usually emphasised their Japanese identities only on occasions when they associate with other Japanese, for instance when they participate in memorial services for Japanese soldiers who died during the Pacific War. Some Japanese-Palauans also chose to be buried in Japanese cemeteries after their deaths, notably those in Koror.

== Economy ==
The Japanese civilian administration encouraged Japanese businessmen and settlers to the expand phosphate mining and copra production, which came into commercial existence during the German colonial era. During this time, new infrastructure was built between towns—including road and harbour facilities, and electricity and sewerage lines were laid out. Immigration from Japan, Okinawa and Korea to Palau intensified as a result of new job opportunities. A state-owned enterprise, Nanyo Kohatsu Kabushiki Kaisha (South Seas Colonization Corporation) was formed in 1936 to streamline the islands' economic activities with the administration objective of developing the islands' self-sufficiency capabilities. In the late 1930s, Japanese pearl divers made regular visits to the Arafura Sea, and stopped by Palau from October to April. The influx of pearl divers from Japan led to the development of the island's tourist industry, and some Japanese settlers from Saipan opened new cafés, geisha houses and liquor houses in Koror to cater to the pearl divers during their stopovers in between October and April.

When the Japanese surrendered in 1945, Japanese business enterprises and organisations in Palau closed, effectively ending the Japanese influence on Palau's economy. In the first two decades after the war, the American occupation government imposed strict trade restrictions with Japan. Contact with Japan was reestablished in the 1960s, starting with Okinawan fishermen who were granted fishing rights. Japanese tourists began to visit Palau in increasing numbers from the mid-1970s. The growing influx of tourists to Palau led to the restoration of heritage sites around Palau, particularly memorial sites and administrative buildings built in the Japanese era as well as Palauan longhouses to accommodate to the interests of Japanese tourists, which accounted for half of all visiting tourists. Many of Palau's tourist sites were run and maintained by Palauan citizens of Japanese-Palauan heritage, whose knowledge in Japanese and Palauan customs and languages helped to facilitate tour groups consisting of Japanese tourists.

== Education ==
The Japanese Language School of Palau, a weekend supplementary programme, is in operation in Koror.

== Notable people ==
- Santy Asanuma, senator
- Elias Camsek Chin, former vice-president
- Hersey Kyota, politician and diplomat
- Kuniwo Nakamura, former president and foreign minister
- Haruo Remeliik, former president
- Peter Sugiyama, former politician
- Shiro Kyota, former politician
- Yositaka Adachi, politician

== See also ==
- Japanese settlement in Micronesia

== Bibliography ==
- Appell, George N., Modernization and the Emergence of a Landless Peasantry: Essays on the Integration of Peripheries to Socioeconomic Centers, Volumes 33-34, Dept. of Anthropology, College of William and Mary, 1985
- Asian Cultural Center, Asian Culture Quarterly, Volume 16, 1988
- Brigham Young University—Hawaii Campus, Pacific Studies, Volumes 5–6, 1981
- Crocombe, R. G., Asia in the Pacific Islands: Replacing the West, 2007, ISBN 982-02-0388-0
- Crocombe, R. G., The South Pacific, University of the South Pacific, 2001, ISBN 982-02-0154-3
- Denoon, Donald; Meleisea, Malama; Firth, Stewart; Linnekin, Jocelyn; Nero, Karen, The Cambridge History of the Pacific Islanders, Cambridge University Press, 2004, ISBN 0-521-00354-7
- Deimel, Claus, Jahrbuch der Staatlichen Ethnographischen Sammlungen Sachsen. Band 43, LIT Verlag Berlin-Hamburg-Münster, 2007, ISBN 3-8258-1484-X
- Goto, Ken'ichi; Kratoska, Paul H., Tensions of Empire: Japan and Southeast Asia in the Colonial and Postcolonial World: Volume 108 of Research in International Studies, NUS Press, 2003, ISBN 9971-69-281-3
- Hezel, Francis X., Strangers in Their Own Land: A Century of Colonial Rule in the Caroline and Marshall Islands (Issue 13 of Pacific Islands Monograph Ser. 13), University of Hawaii Press, 2003, ISBN 0-8248-2804-6
- Leibowitz, Arnold H., Embattled Island: Palau's Struggle for Independence, Greenwood Publishing Group, 1996, ISBN 0-275-95390-4
- McAuley, Thomas E., Language Change in East Asia, Routledge, 2001, ISBN 0-7007-1377-8
- Moon, Opkyo; Guichard-Anguis, Sylvie, Japanese Tourism and Travel Culture: Japan anthropology workshop series, Taylor & Francis, 2009, ISBN 0-415-47001-3
- Nelson, Daniel N.; Dedaić, Mirjana N., Volume 10 of Language, Power, and Social process: At War with Words, Walter de Gruyter, 2003, ISBN 3-11-017649-1
- McCall, Grant; Connell, John, A World Perspective on Pacific Islander Migration: Australia, New Zealand, and the USA: Issue 6 of Pacific Studies Monograph, Centre for South Pacific Studies, University of New South Wales in association with the Bureau of Immigration Research, 1992, ISBN 0-7334-0285-2
- Palau Supreme Court Office of Court Counsel, The Wisdom of the Past, A Vision for the Future: The Judiciary of the Republic of Palau, Office of the Court Counsel, Supreme Court of the Republic of Palau, 2001
- Peattie, Mark R., Nanʻyō: The rise and fall of the Japanese in Micronesia, 1885–1945, University of Hawaii Press, 1988, ISBN 0-8248-1480-0
- Polynesian Cultural Center (Laie, Hawaii), Pacific studies, Volume 19,—Issues 3–4, Brigham Young University—Hawaii Campus. Institute for Polynesian Studies, 1996
- Price, Willard, Pacific Adventure, Reynal & Hitchcock, 1936
- Rechebei, Elizabeth Diaz; McPhetres, Samuel F., History of Palau: Heritage of an Emerging Nation, Ministry of Education, 1997, ISBN 0-9652776-3-1
- The Statesman's Year-book, St. Martin's Press, 1923
- White, Miles Geoffrey; Lindstrom, Lamont, The Pacific theater: island representations of World War II, Part 767—Issue 8 of Pacific Islands Monograph Series, University of Hawaii Press, 1989, ISBN 0-8248-1146-1
- Wurm, Stephen Adolphe; Mühlhäusler, Peter; Tryon, Darrell T., Atlas of Languages of Intercultural Communication in the Pacific, Asia, and the Americas, Volume 2,–Part 2, Walter de Gruyter, 1996, ISBN 3-11-013417-9
- Yoo, Dongwoo; Steckel, Richard E., Institutions, Property Rights, and Economic Growth in Asia, Economics Department, Ohio State University; International Policy Center, Gerald R. Ford of Public Policy, University of Michigan, October 20, 2009
