= Domestic reactions to the January 6 United States Capitol attack =

In the aftermath of the January 6 United States Capitol attack, after drawing widespread condemnation from the U.S. Congress, members of his administration, and the media, 45th U.S. president Donald Trump released a video-recorded statement on January 7, reportedly to stop the resignations of his staff and the threats of impeachment or removal from office. In the statement, he condemned the violence at the U.S. Capitol, saying that "a new administration will be inaugurated", which was widely seen as a concession, and his "focus now turns to ensuring a smooth, orderly, and seamless transition of power" to the Joe Biden administration. Vanity Fair reported that Trump was at least partially convinced to make the statement by U.S. senator Lindsey Graham (R-SC), who told Trump a sufficient number of Senate Republicans would support removing him from office unless he conceded. Kayleigh McEnany, the White House press secretary, had attempted to distance the administration from the rioters' behavior in a televised statement earlier in the day. On January 9, The New York Times reported that Trump had told White House aides he regretted committing to an orderly transition of power and would never resign from office. In a March 25 interview on Fox News, Trump defended the Capitol attackers, saying they were patriots who posed "zero threat", and he criticized law enforcement for "persecuting" the rioters.

The Joint Chiefs of Staff issued a statement on January 12 condemning the attack and reminding military personnel everywhere that incoming president Joe Biden was about to become their commander-in-chief, saying "... the rights of freedom of speech and assembly do not give anyone the right to resort to violence, sedition, and insurrection". The statement also said, "As we have done throughout our history, the U.S. military will obey lawful orders from civilian leadership, support civilian authorities to protect lives and property, ensure public safety in accordance with the law, and remain fully committed to protecting and defending the Constitution of the United States against all enemies, foreign and domestic". U.S. senator Mitch McConnell (R–KY), then the Senate majority leader, called it a "failed insurrection", that "the mob was fed lies", and "they were provoked by the president and other powerful people". Christopher Wray, the director of the Federal Bureau of Investigation (FBI) since 2017, later characterized the incident as domestic terrorism. President Biden, who described the rioters as "terrorists" aimed at "overturning the will of the American people" later shared this opinion. In early 2021, the RAND Corporation released a framework to reduce the risk of extremist activity in the U.S. military.

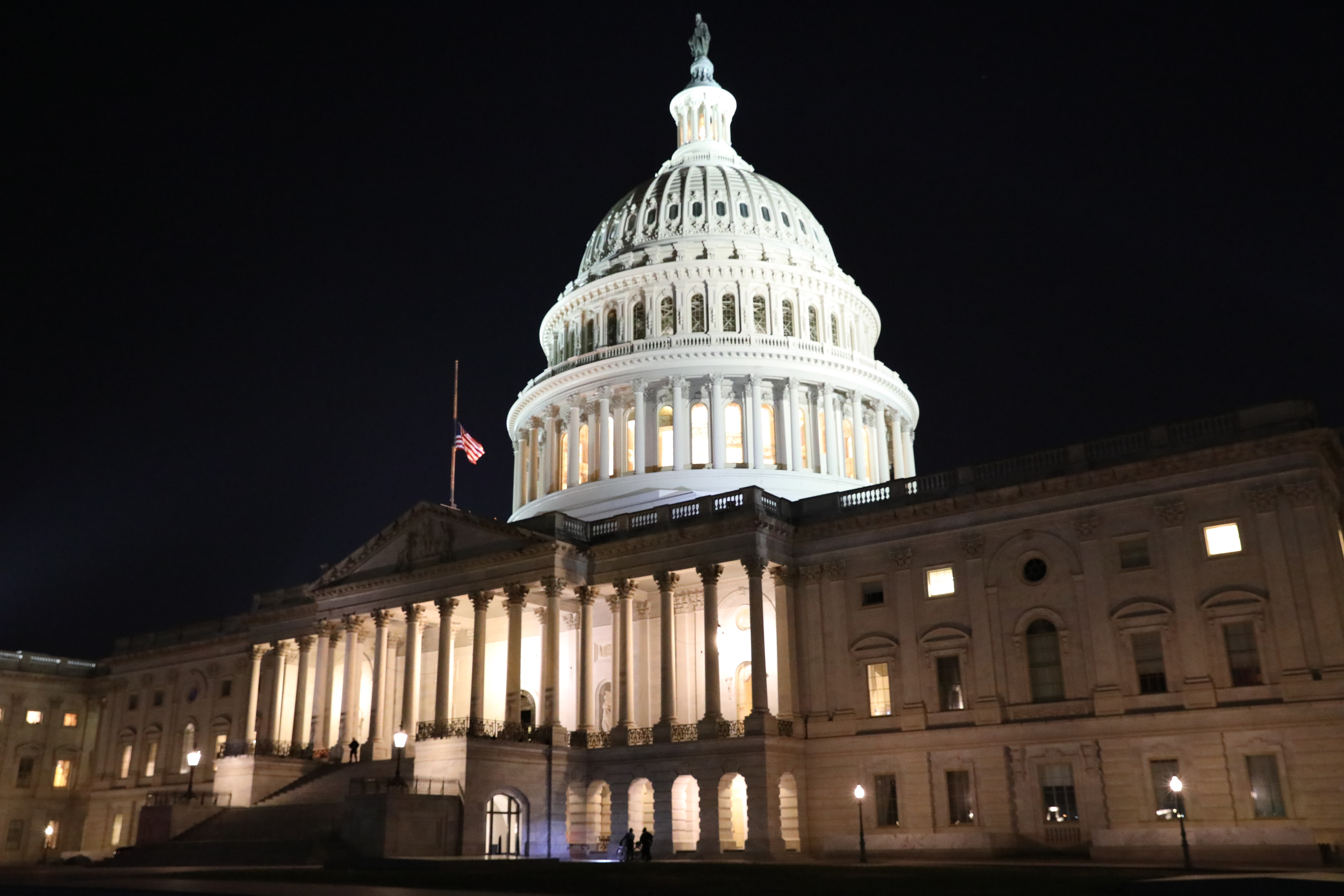
The U.S. flag at the Capitol at half-staff in honor of Officer Sicknick, as seen on January 12

House speaker Nancy Pelosi had the flags at the Capitol lowered to half-staff in honor of Brian Sicknick, a United States Capitol Police officer who died following the attacks. Trump initially declined to lower flags at the White House or other federal buildings under his control, before changing his mind four days later. Biden, Mike Pence, and Pelosi offered condolences to Sicknick's family; Trump did not. After Sicknick's death, Senator Ted Cruz (R-TX) received backlash for previous speeches that were perceived as calls for violence.

A survey by the Hobby School of Public Affairs at the University of Houston taken January 12–20 showed that nearly a third (32%) of Texas Republicans supported the attack, although overall 83% of all Texans who expressed an opinion were opposed to it. In a poll of Americans just after the attack, 79% of those surveyed said America is "falling apart". In February 2022, the Republican National Committee called the events of January 6 "legitimate political discourse".

The US art world reacted through the chronicling of the day as well as the creation of new work. Starting January 7, 2021, the Smithsonian Museum enacted its "rapid-response protocol" to gather rally signs, posters, flags, and weapons abandoned on the National Mall and began work on a digital arts exhibit. Visual artist Paul Chan created his "A drawing as a recording of an insurrection", a 163-inch (4.1 m) double-sided drawing exhibited at the Greene Naftali Gallery in New York. In December 2022, literary press Whiskey Tit released Tell Me What You See, the first fiction published about the attack. At the one-year anniversary, One Six Comics published graphic novel series 1/6 with an accompanying education and action guide by the Western States Center. The Society of Classical Poets website posted various poems about the day, including one glorifying deceased rioter Ashli Babbitt.

== Trump administration ==
=== President Trump ===
Donald Trump's statement during the attack. The video was originally posted on Twitter and shared on other social media before being removed from all platforms for violating various policies.

==== During the riot ====
Trump was in the West Wing of the White House at the time. A close adviser to Trump said the president was not taking many phone calls. When Trump watches television, the adviser explained, he will pause a recorded program to take a phone call, but "if it’s live TV, he watches it, and he was just watching it all unfold".

Trump, who had spent previous weeks promoting the "Save America" rally, was "initially pleased" when his supporters breached the Capitol; he refused to intercede, but also "expressed disgust on aesthetic grounds" about what he called the "low class" appearance of the supporters involved in the rioting. Senator Ben Sasse (R-NE) said that senior White House officials told him Trump was "delighted" to hear that rioters were entering the Capitol. Staffers reported that Trump had been "impossible to talk to throughout the day", and inability to deal with his election loss had, according to one staffer, made Trump "out of his mind". Concerned that Trump may have committed treason through his actions, White House Counsel Pat Cipollone reportedly advised administration officials to avoid contact with Trump and ignore any illegal orders that could further incite the attack to limit their prosecutorial liability under the Sedition Act of 1918.

At 2:46, as the rioting continued and after senators had been evacuated from the Senate floor, Trump phoned Senator Mike Lee (R-UT) intending to speak to Tommy Tuberville (R-AL), asking him to make more objections to the counting of the electoral votes to try to overturn the election. At 2:47, as his supporters violently clashed with police at the Capitol, Trump tweeted, "Please support our Capitol Police and Law Enforcement. They are truly on the side of our Country. Stay peaceful!". The Washington Post later reported that Trump did not want to include the words "stay peaceful".

By 3:10 p.m., the pressure was building on Trump to condemn supporters engaged in the riots; Trump's former communications director, Alyssa Farah, called upon him to "Condemn this now" and wrote, "you are the only one they will listen to". By 3:25 p.m., Trump tweeted "I am asking for everyone at the U.S. Capitol to remain peaceful. No violence! Remember, WE are the Party of Law & Order – respect the Law and our great men and women in Blue", but did not call upon the crowd to disperse. By 3:40 p.m., a number of congressional Republicans called upon Trump to more specifically condemn violence and to call on his supporters to end the occupation of the Capitol: House minority leader Kevin McCarthy (R–CA) said that he had spoken to Trump to ask him to "calm individuals down"; Senator Marco Rubio (R-FL) issued a tweet telling Trump that "it is crucial you help restore order by sending resources to assist the police and ask those doing this to stand down"; and Representative Mike Gallagher (R–WI), in a video message, told Trump to "call it off". Additionally, throughout the day, Trump's daughter Ivanka, who held the position of senior adviser, asked him more than once to stop the violence. Lindsey Graham later told The Washington Post that "it took [Trump] awhile to appreciate the gravity of the situation ... [he] saw these people [the rioters] as allies in his journey and sympathetic to the idea that the election was stolen".

By 3:50 p.m., White House press secretary Kayleigh McEnany said that the National Guard and "other federal protective services" had been deployed. At 4:05 p.m., Pence—in contrast to Trump, who only called upon his supporters to "remain peaceful"—called for the occupation of the Capitol to end immediately. At 4:06 p.m. on national television, President-elect Biden called for President Trump to end the riot. At 4:22 p.m., Trump issued a video message on social media that was later taken down by Twitter, Facebook and YouTube. In it, he praised his supporters and repeated his claims of electoral fraud, saying: "This was a fraudulent election, but we can't play into the hands of these people. We have to have peace. So go home. We love you. You're very special. You've seen what happens. You see the way others are treated that are so bad and so evil. I know how you feel. But go home and go home in peace."

At 6:25 p.m., Trump tweeted: "These are the things and events that happen when a sacred landslide election victory is so unceremoniously & viciously stripped away from great patriots who have been badly & unfairly treated for so long" and then issued a call: "Go home with love & in peace. Remember this day forever!".

At 7:00 p.m., Rudy Giuliani placed a second call to Lee's number and left a voicemail intended for Tuberville urging him to make more objections to the electoral votes as part of a bid "to try to just slow it down". Giuliani said: "I know they're reconvening at 8 tonight, but it ... the only strategy we can follow is to object to numerous states and raise issues so that we get ourselves into tomorrow – ideally until the end of tomorrow".

==== After the riot ====
Donald Trump made another statement many consider a concession after the riot on January 7, 2021.

Shortly after Congress certified Biden's victory, Trump's deputy chief of staff for communications and director of social media, Dan Scavino, issued a statement from Trump saying, "Even though I totally disagree with the outcome of the election, and the facts bear me out, nevertheless, there will be an orderly transition on January 20th. I have always said we would continue our fight to ensure that only legal votes were counted. While this represents the end of the greatest first term in presidential history, it's only the beginning of our fight to Make America Great Again!".

In a video statement released on January 7, Trump condemned the violence at the Capitol, saying that "a new administration will be inaugurated", which was widely seen as a concession, and that his "focus now turns to ensuring a smooth, orderly, and seamless transition of power" to the Biden administration. Vanity Fair reported that Trump was at least partially convinced to do so by Sen. Lindsey Graham (R-SC), who told Trump that a sufficient number of Senate Republicans would support removing him from office unless he conceded. White House press secretary Kayleigh McEnany had attempted to distance the administration from the rioters' behavior in a televised statement earlier in the day. On January 9, The New York Times reported that Trump had told White House aides that he regretted committing to an orderly transition of power and would never resign from office.

CNN fact checker Daniel Dale reported that through June 9, 2021, Trump had issued 132 written statements since leaving office, of which "a third have included lies about the election"—more than any other subject.

Trump's acknowledgment of his electoral defeat was met with opposition and hesitation from some of his supporters. Pro-Trump and far-right political commentators Nick Fuentes and Cassandra Fairbanks said Trump had "throw[n] his supporters under the bus" while QAnon conspiracy theorists performed a numerological reading of the time stamps in Trump's video statement and deemed there was a secret encoded message; Politico highlighted previously pro-Trump users of the far-right social network Parler calling Trump a "dildo".

Axios reported that Trump spoke with Kevin McCarthy on January 11, telling McCarthy "Antifa people" had stormed the Capitol; McCarthy told him "it's MAGA. I know. I was there." Trump also complained to McCarthy about election fraud, causing McCarthy to reply "[t]he election is over".

On January 12, in his first public appearance since the Capitol riot, Trump condemned the violence but denied he was responsible for inciting the mob stating that his remarks at the "Save America" rally were "totally appropriate".

On January 13, hours after his second impeachment, Trump reiterated his condemnation of the violence in a video statement. He did not claim responsibility for the riot. In the wake of the suspensions of his social media accounts, he denounced "the unprecedented assault on free speech we have seen in recent days", saying that "[w]hat is needed now is for us to listen to one another, not to silence one another".

In a March interview, Trump said he remembered his speech on January 6 as "a very beautiful time with extremely loving and friendly people". He made the comment to ABC reporter Jonathan Karl, who was interviewing him for a forthcoming book; Trump's comment was publicly revealed in November.

In a March 25 interview on Fox News, Trump defended the Capitol attackers, saying that they were patriots who posed "zero threat". He also criticized law enforcement for "persecuting" the rioters. He made no mention of the deaths or the attacks on police officers. His former chief of staff Mick Mulvaney said on March 27 that the comment that there was "no risk" was "manifestly false" since "people were killed".

In October 2021, Trump stated "The insurrection took place on November 3, Election Day. January 6 was the Protest!".

Trump planned to give a press conference from Mar-a-Lago on the one-year anniversary of the attack, but he canceled it after learning that TV stations would likely not broadcast it live.

Throughout 2022, Trump said multiple times that if he were reelected in 2024, he might pardon rioters.

In December 2022, in a post on Truth Social, Trump referred to the 2020 election as a "Massive Fraud" requiring a response that "allows for the termination of all rules, regulations, and articles, even those found in the Constitution". Two weeks later, in another Truth Social post, he referred to the FBI and Justice Department as "the Cancer" that was sickening the nation, adding: "These Weaponized Thugs and Tyrants must be dealt with".

In March 2023, Trump acknowledged that there had been a "problem" with protests that day, telling reporters: "Had he [Pence] sent the votes back to the legislators, they wouldn't have had a problem with Jan. 6. So in many ways, you can blame him for Jan. 6."

=== First Lady Melania Trump ===
Five days after the riot, First Lady Melania Trump issued a statement that condemned the violence and also complained about unspecified criticism of her, saying "I find it shameful that surrounding these tragic events there has been salacious gossip, unwarranted personal attacks, and false misleading accusations on me—from people who are looking to, be relevant and have an agenda", recycling lines from her 2020 Republican National Convention speech. As the attack took place, she was reportedly conducting a photoshoot inside the White House for a self-proposed coffee table book on furniture and decorative items she acquired and restored during her husband's term.

=== Vice President Pence ===
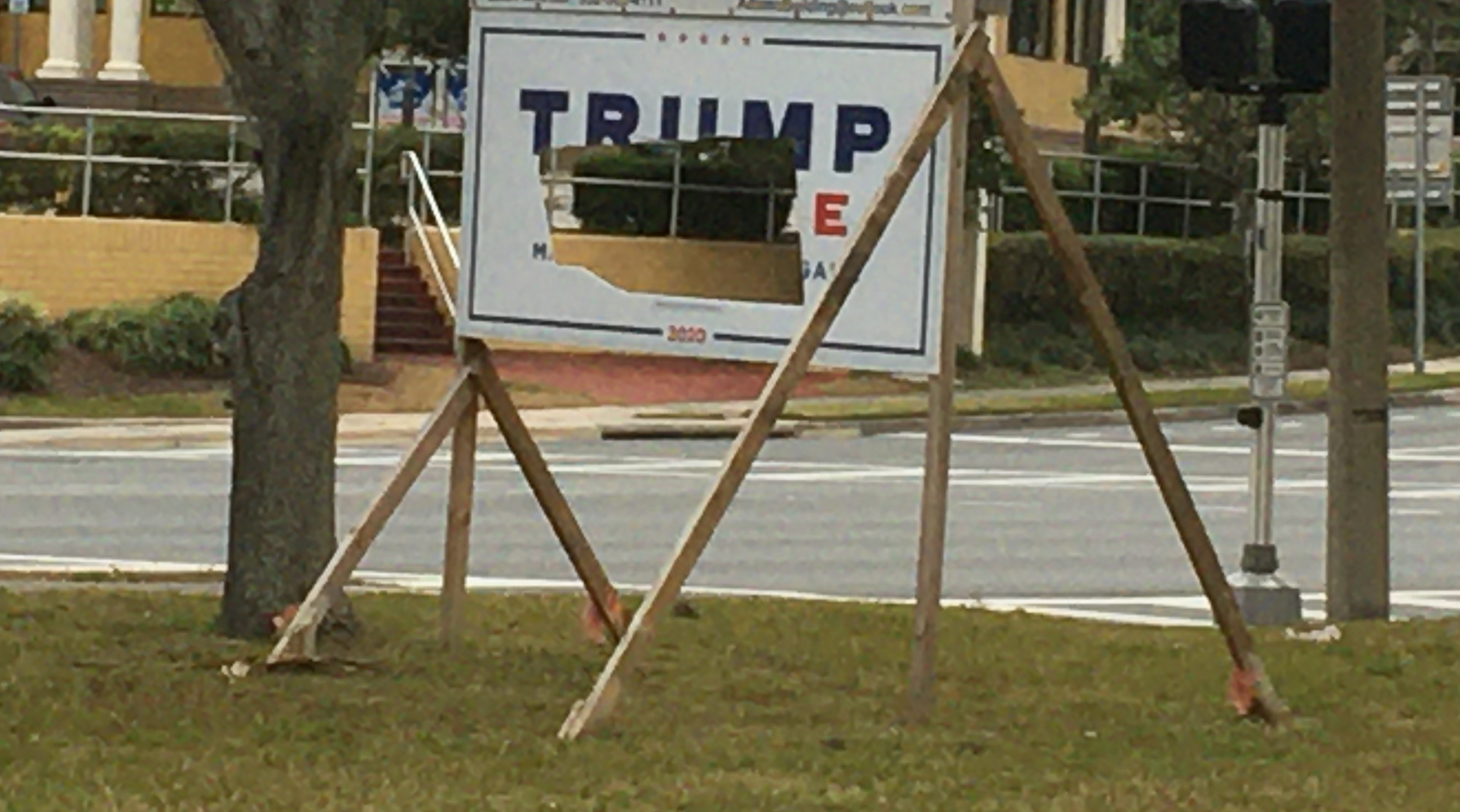
A Trump–Pence sign on a city street corner was smashed after the attack on the Capitol.

Pence tweeted at 3:35 p.m. on January 6, "This attack on our Capitol will not be tolerated and those involved will be prosecuted to the fullest extent of the law". He later spoke to the Senate when they reconvened on the night of January 6, saying, "Today was a dark day in the United States Capitol ... To those who wreaked havoc in our Capitol today, you did not win. Violence never wins. Freedom wins. And this is still the People's House."

According to sources close to the vice president, Trump never reached out to Pence or inquired about his safety during the riot, even as protesters inside the Capitol were seeking him out and chanting "Where is Pence?". Aides believed that Pence was being set up as a scapegoat for Trump's failure to overturn the results of the election. Pence was described as very angry with Trump, and the two did not speak again until January 11. After their term ended, they continued to speak with each other on "many" occasions, according to Pence in a speech at a county-level Republican Party event on June 3. However, he added: "I don't know if we'll ever see eye to eye on that day".

=== Secretary of State Pompeo ===
On January 7, the State Department told diplomats to affirm Biden's victory. On January 8, Secretary Mike Pompeo met with incoming secretary of state Antony Blinken.

Pompeo commented on January 7 that the United States is not a banana republic, saying that "In a banana republic, mob violence determines the exercise of power. In the United States, law enforcement officials quash mob violence so that the people's representatives can exercise power in accordance with the rule of law and constitutional government."

=== Military ===
On January 12, General Mark Milley, the entire Joint Chiefs of Staff, and all of the heads of each military branch issued a statement condemning the attack and reminding all service members of their obligation to support and defend the Constitution and reject extremism. They said, "As we have done throughout our history, the U.S. military will obey lawful orders from the civilian leadership, support civilian authorities to protect lives and property, ensure public safety in accordance with the law, and remain fully committed to protecting and defending the Constitution of the United States against all enemies, foreign and domestic".

== President-elect Biden and Vice President-elect Harris ==
External videos
- Comments by President-elect Joe Biden, January 6, 2021, C-SPAN

On January 6 at 4:06 p.m., President-elect Joe Biden addressed the nation from Wilmington, Delaware, calling the events an insurrection and borderline sedition, and said that "our democracy is under unprecedented assault". He called upon Trump to go on national television and demand an end to the protests. The following day Biden said the attack constituted domestic terrorism.

Minutes after Biden's initial condemnation of the riots, Vice President-elect Kamala Harris reiterated the president-elect's comments on Twitter, writing that the protests were an "assault on the Capitol and our nation's public servants".

== Congress ==
Schumer's speech following the riot, during the reconvening of Congress later that evening

Outgoing Senate majority leader Mitch McConnell called the attack a "failed insurrection" and said "we are back at our posts, we will discharge our duty under the Constitution and for our nation. And we're going to do it tonight." He later said "the mob was fed lies" and that "they were provoked by the president". Senate minority leader Chuck Schumer and House Speaker Nancy Pelosi called upon Trump to "demand that all protesters leave the U.S. Capitol and Capitol Grounds immediately". Schumer, in his speech following the resuming of Senate business, labeled those participating in the attack as "domestic terrorists", whose actions will be a "stain on our country not so easily washed away". Pelosi later said, following her announcement that the electoral vote count would proceed during the evening of January 6 (Epiphany), "let us pray that this instigation to violence will provide an epiphany for our country to heal".

Senate minority leader Chuck Schumer said, "What happened at the US Capitol yesterday was an insurrection against the United States, incited by the president. This president should not hold office one day longer." He called on then-Vice President Mike Pence to invoke Section 4 of the Twenty-fifth Amendment to the United States Constitution that enables power to be transferred from the president to the vice-president if the president is deemed incapable of handling duties.

Representative Adam Kinzinger (R–IL) condemned the violence and described the events as a "coup attempt". He was the first Republican to publicly request invocation of the 25th amendment, stating "the president is unfit, the president is unwell, the president must now relinquish control of the executive branch voluntarily, or involuntarily". Representative Liz Cheney (R-WY), the chair of the House Republican Conference (the third-ranking member of the House Republican leadership), said "No question the president formed the mob, the president incited the mob, the president addressed the mob. He lit the flame." Newly-sworn-in Representative Nancy Mace (R–SC), who had worked for the president's 2016 campaign, said that "everything that he's worked for ... all of that – his entire legacy – was wiped out" by the violence. Representative Mike Gallagher remarked of the riots that he had "not seen anything like this since I deployed to Iraq". House minority whip Steve Scalise (R-LA), who was shot in 2017 while at baseball practice with fellow Republicans, issued a statement that "United States Capitol Police saved my life. Attacks on law enforcement officers trying to do their jobs are never acceptable. Period. We can passionately protest without being violent." Representative Cathy McMorris Rodgers (R–WA), who had planned to oppose the certification of the electoral vote, announced that she would no longer object to the Electoral College results after witnessing the "disgraceful and un-American" events of January 6. She was joined by senators Kelly Loeffler (R-GA), James Lankford (R-OK), Steve Daines (R-MT), Marsha Blackburn (R-TN), and Mike Braun (R-IN), all of whom reversed course on the issue of contesting the electoral vote after witnessing the violence of the mob.

Senator Mitt Romney (R-UT) said, "What happened at the U.S. Capitol today was an insurrection, incited by the President of the United States" and part of "an unprecedented attack on our democracy". Senator Ben Sasse (R-NE) said, "This violence was the inevitable and ugly outcome of the president's addiction to constantly stoking division". Senator Pat Toomey (R-PA) took to the Senate floor to say, "We saw bloodshed because a demagogue chose to spread falsehoods and sow distrust of his own fellow Americans". Senator Richard Burr (R-NC) said, "The president bears responsibility for today's events by promoting the unfounded conspiracy theories that have led to this point". Senator Ted Cruz (R-TX) condemned the protest and said, "Violence is always unacceptable. Even when passions run high. Anyone engaged in violence – especially against law enforcement – should be fully prosecuted."

Cruz himself, as well as Senator Josh Hawley (R-MO), were subsequently urged to resign by senators Chris Coons (D-DE), Patty Murray (D-WA), and Ron Wyden (D-OR). Criticism was also leveled against both senators for sending out fundraising messages while the events in Washington were unfolding. First-year U.S. representative Lauren Boebert (R–CO) – who, in another tweet, appeared to compare the events to the outbreak of the American Revolutionary War – also faced calls for expulsion from Congress and criminal prosecution after Twitter posts from her Twitter sent as House Representative and congressional staff were sheltering from the rioters surfaced, in which she disclosed that House Speaker Nancy Pelosi had been escorted from the House chamber.

On June 8, 2021, the Senate Homeland Security and Rules committees released a bipartisan report on the attack. The report avoided mentioning Trump, including by not focusing on the question of why protesters had gathered at the Capitol.

== Former presidents ==
All four living former presidents – Barack Obama, George W. Bush, Bill Clinton, and Jimmy Carter – denounced the attack, with Obama and Clinton condemning Trump for inciting the violence. Bush, who has infrequently commented on national matters since leaving office in 2009, released a statement saying "This is how election results are disputed in a banana republic – not our democratic republic", adding that he was "appalled by the reckless behavior of some political leaders since the election and by the lack of respect shown today for our institutions, our traditions, and our law enforcement". Bush later said that he was "disgusted" and "sick to my stomach" from the events, and he added that the attack was not a peaceful protest. Obama wrote that "History will rightly remember today's violence at the Capitol, incited by a sitting president ... as a moment of great dishonor and shame for our nation". He called the violence "unsurprising", arguing that the Republican Party had promoted a "fantasy narrative" regarding the 2020 election results that culminated in the violent outburst.

== Other domestic reactions ==
=== Against Capitol attackers ===
Former attorney general William Barr, who had resigned two weeks prior, denounced the violence, calling it "outrageous and despicable", adding that the president's actions were a "betrayal of his office and supporters" and that "orchestrating a mob to pressure Congress is inexcusable". Trump's former White House chief of staff Mick Mulvaney urged the President to call a stop to the attack, and later resigned from his post as the United States special envoy for Northern Ireland. Jim Mattis, a former Marine general and Trump's first secretary of defense, and Tom Bossert, Trump's first homeland security adviser, condemned Trump for enabling the attack and destroying trust in the election. Terry Gainer, a former chief of the Capitol Police and former Senate sergeant-at arms, described the protests as unprecedented in law enforcement, declaring that "this is a much more hateful crowd incited by the president himself. It's definitely something new in our business."

Former Republican House speaker John Boehner said that "the invasion of our Capitol by a mob, incited by lies from some entrusted with power". He also said that his party was off taking a nap that has become a "nightmare for our nation".

Former Senate Democratic leader and U.S. senator Harry Reid said through a statement, that his first job in Washington was a Capitol police officer and that he could never imagine the turmoil he's seeing in the Capitol. He also said that Trump was "stoking unrest with his lies, misinformation and disdain for the institutions of our country."

Former ambassador to the U.N. Nikki Haley condemned the riot as "wrong and un-American" and, in a closed-door speech to Republican National Committee members the following day, criticized Trump's actions since Election Day. On his MSNBC program Morning Joe, host Joe Scarborough, a former Republican congressman, called for the arrest of President Trump, Donald Trump Jr. and Rudy Giuliani for their role in inciting the crowd to storm the Capitol through their election fraud rhetoric.

Michael Morell, former acting CIA director during the Obama administration, said, "We should be calling what happened [on January 6] domestic terrorism". Similarly, national security expert Bruce Hoffman also determined that the attack on the Capitol constituted "domestic terrorism". Former secretary of state Colin Powell criticized Republicans for supporting Trump's behavior over the election results that led to his incitement of the riots for their own political calculations, saying: "I can no longer call myself a fellow Republican".

Former New Jersey governor and Trump supporter Chris Christie was "absolutely sickened" by the riots. The Austrian-born former California governor Arnold Schwarzenegger compared the riot to Nazi Germany's Kristallnacht ("Night of broken glass") of 1938, said that the riots had "shattered the ideals we took for granted" and "trampled the very principles on which our country was founded"; and criticized fellow Republicans' "spinelessness".

In a highly unusual move, within several days of the riot, a number of U.S. diplomats used the State Department's Dissent Channel to send two cables that condemned Trump's incitement of the Capitol attack; called upon Pence and the Cabinet to invoke the 25th Amendment to declare Trump unfit for office; and wrote that "[f]ailing to publicly hold the president to account would further damage our democracy and our ability to effectively accomplish our foreign policy goals abroad". One of the cables called upon the State Department to "explicitly denounce President Trump’s role in this violent attack on the U.S. government", and added that "Just as we routinely denounce foreign leaders who use violence and intimidation to interfere in peaceful democratic processes and override the will of their voters, the department's public statements about this episode should also mention President Trump by name. It is critical that we communicate to the world that in our system, no one – not even the president – is above the law or immune from public criticism."

In another unusual move, Gen. Mark Milley and the Joint Chiefs of Staff, who usually steer clear of politics, issued a statement on January 12 reminding the military that Biden was about to become their commander-in-chief and that "the rights of freedom of speech and assembly do not give anyone the right to resort to violence, sedition, and insurrection".

Football coach Bill Belichick, scheduled to receive the Presidential Medal of Freedom from Trump on January 14, declined the award, citing the "tragic events" that had occurred.

Influential evangelical pastors Samuel Rodriguez, John Hagee, Robert Jeffress, and Albert Mohler, who are Trump supporters, spoke out against the riot.

Fox News published two editorials on their website on January 6 denouncing the attack, including an editorial by Karl Rove which placed most of the blame on Trump for gathering the rioters. Conservative news outlets National Review and the Washington Examiner both published articles denouncing the attack, with the Examiner calling for Trump to be impeached and removed from office.

=== Support for Capitol attackers ===
The New York Times reported that Trump supporters in Congress, the media, and in conservative politics "downplayed the violence as acts of desperation by people who felt lied to by the news media and ignored by their elected representatives". Others asserted the violence was actually caused by people associated with antifa. ABC News reported that conservative media outlets were clear that "the violence was indefensible", and that several conservative media outlets said that "liberal politicians and mainstream media outlets are more outraged when Trump supporters are violent than they were about civil rights demonstrations last summer", with Newsmax calling out the "hypocritical double standard on Trump vs. Black Lives Matter protests". Columbia Journalism Review reported that reactions to the attack from right-wing media were mixed.

Ivanka Trump, the president's eldest daughter, was criticized for addressing the rioters as "American patriots" in a now-deleted tweet publicly urging the cessation of violence.

Conservative media hosts Tucker Carlson, Sean Hannity, Greg Kelly, and Mark Levin also sought to deflect responsibility from Trump supporters. Sinclair Broadcast Group provided a video segment to its owned and operated television stations in over 100 markets in which correspondent James Rosen reported "far-left infiltrators" had been involved, though he did not provide a source for the assertion. Right-wing radio host Rush Limbaugh compared the rioters to the Founding Fathers of the United States. Lou Dobbs criticized Capitol police for drawing guns "on American citizens, most of whom are patriots". Fox News television host Pete Hegseth defended the rioters, saying "they just love freedom" and that "people feel like the entire system is rigged against them".

In addition to the dozens of police officers suspected of participating in Trump's pre-riot rally, joining the Capitol riots, or both, some law enforcement officials made statements in support of the rally. John Catanzara, chair of the Chicago chapter of the Fraternal Order of Police, said that the rioters who attacked the Capitol were "entitled to voice their frustration" and claimed the event, which resulted in several deaths, had been non-violent.

Members of the far-right group Proud Boys posted messages boasting and taking credit for causing "absolute terror". Walter West II, the sergeant-at-arms of the Republican Party of Texas, was removed from his post after expressing support for the rioters on Facebook.

Far-right conspiracy theory and fake news website InfoWars ran the headline "Unarmed woman carrying Trump flag executed in U.S. Capitol building" on January 6. Far-right political website Big League Politics called Mike Pence a traitor for praising the Capitol Police, who shot a "patriotic woman dead".

On February 5, 2022, Arkansas governor Asa Hutchinson joined with Alaska U.S. senator Lisa Murkowski to condemn the Republican National Committee's censure of representatives Adam Kinzinger and Liz Cheney.

The pair had been censured for their support of, and participation in, the Select Committee of the U.S. House tasked with investigating the Capitol attack. The RNC contended that the lethal riot was an example of "legitimate political discourse".

In December 2022, Representative Marjorie Taylor Greene told the New York Young Republican Club: "If Steve Bannon and I had organized that [the Capitol attack], we would have won. Not to mention, we would’ve been armed." The event was attended by Rudy Giuliani, Steve Bannon, Donald Trump Jr., and Jack Posobiec; lawmakers including George Santos, Mike Collins and Cory Mills; and members of VDARE and Project Veritas.

=== Conspiracy theories ===
Immediately after the attack, some Trump loyalists and pro-Trump outlets spread the false claim that the incident was a false flag operation staged by antifa to implicate Trump supporters. Although it was repeatedly debunked, the disinformation campaign effectively spread the falsehood, A poll released in February 2021 by the American Enterprise Institute found that 30% of Americans (including 50% of Republicans and 20% of Democrats) believe antifa was mostly responsible for the violence that happened in the riots at the U.S. Capitol. The FBI said there was no evidence of antifa involvement in the mob incursion.

Claims that the attack was a false flag operation instigated or staged by the FBI also spread. In one case, a right-wing website run by Darren Beattie, a former Trump White House speechwriter, published a story containing unfounded theories of FBI orchestration of the incident, which was quickly promoted by popular Fox News host Tucker Carlson, followed by several Republican members of Congress advancing the theory; one congressman entered the website story into the Congressional Record. Carlson produced a three-part series, "Patriot Purge", a trailer of which he aired on his broadcast before the series was presented on the Fox Nation streaming service. The series asserted that the attack was a false flag operation designed to entrap and imprison political dissidents. Carlson stated on-air that the government had "launched a new war" on American citizens and characterized his series as "rock-solid factually". Fact-checkers found the series contained numerous falsehoods and conspiracy theories. Michael Jensen, a senior researcher at the National Consortium for the Study of Terrorism and Responses to Terrorism, called it "political propaganda that is meant to rally a support base that has shown a willingness to mobilize on the basis of disinformation and lies. That's how we got Jan. 6 in the first place." Around the one-year anniversary of the attack, Trump sought to discredit the January 6 committee investigation by issuing a statement echoing claims by Beattie, Matt Gaetz and Marjorie Taylor Greene that there had been a "fedsurrection", as Beattie promoted baseless speculation that circulated online about a passenger in a "Hippies for Trump" bus who allegedly enabled the attack.

Another conspiracy theory of government involvement in the incident involved Ray Epps, a Trump supporter and former president of the Arizona chapter of Oath Keepers, members of which were indicted for their role in the attack. On the eve of the attack, Epps was captured on video exhorting people to "go into the Capitol" the next day. After stating "peacefully", observers began chanting that he was a "fed". On the day of the attack, he was captured on video saying, "OK, folks, spread the word! As soon as the president is done speaking, we go to the Capitol." Speculation began that Epps was a federal agent inciting the attack with a post on the 4chan anonymous message board declaring "This Fed was caught on camera encouraging the crowd to raid the Capitol on the next day", then went viral on social media and was promoted by Darren Beattie, Chanel Rion, Steve Bannon and Tucker Carlson – both on his program and in "Patriot Purge". Republicans Thomas Massie and Ted Cruz asked Justice Department officials about Epps during public hearings. The January 6 committee later stated that Epps had told it he had never had any connections to law enforcement.

=== Opinion polling ===
- A YouGov poll of 1,397 U.S. registered voters taken immediately after the attack found that overall, 71% opposed the attack (while 21% supported it), and 62% believed that it should be considered a threat to democracy. Among Republicans, 45% of Republicans supported the attack, with 43% opposed. In contrast, 96% of Democrats and 67% of independents were opposed. 52% of Republicans blamed Joe Biden for the incident.
- An Ipsos poll of 1,005 U.S. adults conducted January 7–8, 2021 found that 70% of Americans disapproved of Trump's actions leading up to the assault on the Capitol, and 57% of Americans wanted Trump to be immediately removed for his role in the riots. Seventy percent of respondents – including two-thirds of Republicans and Trump voters surveyed – described the participants as "criminals" or "fools"; 9% saw them as "concerned citizens"; and 5% saw them as "patriots." Among 339 Trump voters surveyed, 70% opposed the attack by the rioting supporters, while 12% of all respondents supported their actions.
- A PBS NewsHour/Marist Poll of 875 U.S. adults conducted on January 7, 2021, found that 18% of Republicans supported the riots. Generally, 88% of all respondents opposed or strongly opposed the rioters' actions, and 90% believed the perpetrators of the riot should face prosecution (with 17% of Republicans disagreeing); 63% of respondents felt Trump held "a great deal or good amount of blame" for the attack, while 69% of surveyed Republicans believed Trump bore "little or no-fault". Support for Trump's removal from office was split, with 48% supporting it and 49% (including 51% of independent voters) opposed.
- A Washington Post-ABC News poll conducted January 10–13, 2021 found that almost 9 in 10 American adults opposed the attack, and 8 in 10 said they opposed it strongly. More than two-thirds of Americans said Trump had made irresponsible statements since the November 2020 election. Furthermore, a majority (56% of all American adults, including 89% of Democrats and 12% of Republicans) believed that Congress should remove Trump from office and disqualify him from holding future office.
- A Quinnipiac University poll conducted January 7–10, 2021 found that 80% of Republican voters did not hold Trump responsible for the incident and that 73% of Republican voters believed Trump's presidency had the overall effect of protecting democracy. Yet only 33% of respondents (across all political affiliations) approved of Trump's overall performance as president, making him the president with the lowest approval rating at the end of his first term (the closest was George H. W. Bush who ended his term with 40% approval).
- An Reuters/Ipsos poll of 1,005 U.S. adults conducted March 30–31, 2021 found that 51% of Republicans agreed (strongly or somewhat) that the people who gathered at the U.S. Capitol were peaceful, law-abiding Americans, and 55% of Republicans agreed (strongly or somewhat) that they were actually led by violent left-wing protestors trying to make Trump look bad. Paradoxically, the poll found that 35% of Republicans agreed with both of these theories simultaneously.
- Three years after the attack, a Washington Post-University of Maryland poll found that 25% of Americans believed the falsehood promoted by right-wing media that the FBI had "probably" or "definitely" instigated the attack. 39% percent of those who said Fox News was their primary news source believed the falsehood, compared to 16% of CNN and MSNBC viewers and 13% of broadcast news viewers.

=== Media coverage and criticism ===
Coverage of the attack – which preempted regular daytime and prime time programming scheduled for January 6 on ABC, NBC, and CBS – gave CNN its most-watched day in its 40-year history, with its daytime coverage netting an average of 8.97 million viewers (vs. 5.74 million for Fox News, 5.59 million for MSNBC, 4.85 million for ABC and 3.7 million for CBS) and its prime time coverage topping out at 8.20 million viewers (vs. 7.38 million for MSNBC, 5.77 million for NBC, 4.88 million for ABC, 4.58 million for Fox News and 2.57 million for CBS). According to The West Australian, coverage of the attack "dominated the front pages of newspapers around the US".

CNN Business opinion writer Oliver Darcy argued that multichannel television providers should be held to equal accountability as social media companies for promoting disinformation by carrying conservative news/opinion channels like Fox News, Newsmax TV and One America News Network (OAN). On the January 8 edition of his eponymous Fox News program, Tucker Carlson claimed CNN was "working to force the Fox News Channel off the air and run [the network] out of business", and had lobbied five providers to drop it.

On January 6, radio broadcasting conglomerate Cumulus Media, whose roster of conservative talk pundits includes Dan Bongino, Mark Levin and Ben Shapiro, directed its on-air personalities to stop spreading false information about the 2020 election being "stolen" or face termination.

=== Corporate response ===
On January 10, a number of companies (including the financial company Morgan Stanley and the hotel chain Marriott, which each have their own PAC) announced they would cease their political contributions to members of Congress who had voted against certifying the Electoral College results.

=== Reflections on pre-event intelligence failures ===
The June 2023 report by the Senate Committee on Homeland Security and Governmental Affairs about intelligence failures leading up to the attack

Several security specialists were surprised that there was no intelligence bulletin or joint threat assessment issued by the FBI and DHS about threats anticipated for the Congressional counting of Electoral College votes, although former secretary of homeland security Michael Chertoff said that publicly available information had been sufficient to make it clear there was a foreseeable risk. Some specialists said that the FBI and DHS didn't issue assessments out of concern for First Amendment free speech protections, although others pointed out that such concerns had not prevented their issuing assessments about racial justice protests in 2020, and that the First Amendment doesn't protect threatening and planning violence. There is concern that the failure to identify the threats adequately before the event illuminate biases in law enforcement about likely perpetrators.

Following the Department of Homeland Security (DHS)'s chief Chad Wolf's "State of the Homeland Address" in September 2020, Brian Murphy, who ran Homeland Security intelligence operations from March 2018 to July 31, 2020, alleged as a whistleblower that Stephen Miller's viewpoints on what President Trump deemed were domestic threats such as supporters of sanctuary areas, antifa, and anarchist groups were to have increased surveillance and less surveillance of Russian influence in the United States and right wing groups including domestic white supremacy. After filing two reports with the Department of Homeland Security's Office of the Inspector General about "attempted censorship of intelligence analysis", Murphy alleged that Wolf, Ken Cuccinelli, and Kirstjen Nielsen actively supported President Trump's views. Murphy allegedly received a demotion and retaliation after he expressed to Adam Schiff, the chairman of the House Intelligence Committee, his concerns that right wing groups were not being analyzed adequately as domestic threats. According to Murphy, Wolf stated that Robert O'Brien, who was President Trump's National Security Council, had directed DHS in mid-May 2020 to provide information regarding threats from China and Iran and to "cease providing intelligence assessments on the threat of Russian interference". Murphy had declined to follow Wolf's order because to do so "would put the country in substantial and specific danger". Although the DHS in early July 2020 was aware of Russia interfering with Joe Biden's campaign, its report was not released. Joseph V. Cuffari, DHS inspector general (IG), refused to investigate Murphy's claims until after the 2020 elections. The DHS Office of Intelligence & Analysis released no "intelligence products specific for January 6". On April 27, 2021, Brian Volsky, the former head of the DHS inspector general's whistleblower protection unit, filed a memo with CIGIE accusing Cuffari, James Read, who was the DHS IG counsel to Cuffari and Kristen Fredricks, who was Cuffari's DHS IG chief of staff, of mishandling Brian Murphy's complaints and "gross mismanagement and conduct that undermines the independence or integrity reasonably expected of" an inspector general.

=== Satire ===
The Babylon Bee, a conservative Christian news satire website, ran a satirical article about the attack with the headline "Trump walks away from Republican party without even looking back at the explosion". The article also made up a quote from Steve Bannon and Nancy Pelosi both saying "I've never seen anything so beautiful".

The event is also referenced in the 2024 comedy film Unfrosted.

== See also ==
- International reactions to the January 6 United States Capitol attack
- United States House Select Committee on the January 6 Attack public hearings
