= List of ambassadors of Palau to the United States =

Coordinates: 38.899332°N 77.039935°W

Ambassador of Palau to the United States
- Incumbent; Hersey Kyota since November 12, 1997
- Inaugural holder: David Orrukem
- Formation: March 20, 1995

The Palauan ambassador in Washington, D. C. is the official representative of the Government in Ngerulmud to the Government of the United States.

== List of representatives ==
Diplomatic agrément	Diplomatic accreditation	Ambassador	Observations	President of Palau	List of presidents of the United States	Term end
August 4, 1997	March 20, 1995	David Orrukem	Chargé d'affaires, opened the embassy	Kuniwo Nakamura	Bill J. Clinton	2001
September 30, 1997	November 12, 1997	Hersey Kyota		Kuniwo Nakamura	Bill J. Clinton; George W. Bush; Barack H. Obama; Donald J. Trump; Joe R. Biden	
