= Shiro Kyota =

Palauan politician

Speaker of the House of Delegates of Palau
- In office January 1989 – November 1992
- Preceded by: Santos Olikong
- Succeeded by: Surangel S. Whipps

Personal details
- Children: Hersey Kyota

Shiro Kyota is a Palauan politician and a former speaker of the House of Delegates of Palau from January 1989 to November 1992.

He was elected to Palau Legislature in 1960s and 1970s. He represented the State of Ngaremlengui. He run for a seat in the Senate of Palau in 1980, but lost.

He became finance officer for the Palau government. He won a seat in the House of Delegates of Palau in 1980s. He represented the state of Ngaremlengui. He was vice speaker of House of Delegates of Palau by 1985. He was elected speaker in 1989 and served until his retirement. He was succeeded as speaker by Surangel S. Whipps in January 1993.

Kyota is of half-Japanese heritage, being the son of a Palau-based Japanese trader and his Palauan wife. He is the father of Hersey Kyota.

== Bibliography ==
- Deimel, Claus, Jahrbuch der Staatlichen Ethnographischen Sammlungen Sachsen. Band 43, LIT Verlag Berlin-Hamburg-Münster, 2007, ISBN 3-8258-1484-X
