= Hersey Kyota =

Palauan politician and diplomat

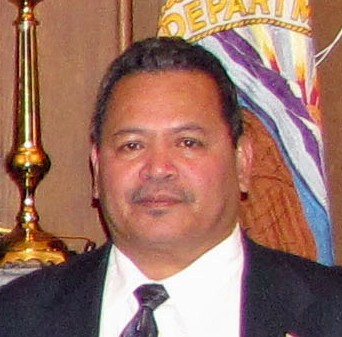

2nd Palauan Ambassador to the United States
- Incumbent
- Assumed office November 12, 1997
- President: Kuniwo Nakamura; Tommy Remengesau; Johnson Toribiong; Surangel Whipps Jr.
- Preceded by: David Orrukem

Personal details
- Born: May 1, 1953 (age 73) Palau
- Children: Six children
- Parent: Shiro Kyota (father)
- Education: U.S. International University
- Profession: Diplomat

Hersey Kyota (born May 1, 1953) is a Palauan politician and diplomat who has served as the ambassador of Palau to the United States since 1997. He is the current dean of the Diplomatic Corps in Washington, D.C., as the longest-serving ambassador to the United States.

Prior to his appointment as ambassador, Kyota was the chief clerk for the House of Delegates in the Palau National Congress, and director of the House Legal Counsels' Office in Palau. From 1990 to 1996, he served a senator in the Palau National Congress, and sat on the Board of Directors for the Association of Pacific Island Legislatures from 1992 to 1996. He has occasionally represented Palau in the United Nations.

Kyota received his bachelor's degree and master of arts degree from International University in San Diego. He is married and has five children.

== Political career ==
From 1981 to 1984, Hersey Kyota was legal researcher for the House of Delegates in the Palau National Congress. He was then chief clerk for the House of Delegates from 1985 to 1988. From 1989 to 1990, he was the director of the House Legal Counsels’ Office. From 1990 to 1996, he served as a senator in the Palau National Congress and for the Board of Directors for the Association of Pacific Island Legislatures from 1992 to 1996. Finally, he became the Palau ambassador to the United States on November 12, 1997. In 2000, Kyota was chairman of the Palau Delegation to the United Nations during the Millennium Summit. In his speech, he emphasized the need for equal and substantial participation from all member states in UN-related activities. He also spoke in front of the United States Senate Committee on Energy and Natural Resources regarding many issues between American-Palau relations, including education grants and the transmission of videotape programming.

As the longest serving ambassador to the United States he also holds the position of Dean of the Diplomatic Corps. In this position he is the most senior diplomat to the United States and therefore entitled to special privileges under the Vienna Convention such as attendance at the State of the Union address each year.

== Education and personal life ==
Hersey Kyota earned a Bachelor of Arts in 1977 and a Master of Arts in 1979 from the United States International University in San Diego.

Kyota is the son of Shiro Kyota, who served as a finance officer before he became the speaker of Palau's National Congress. Shiro Kyota of half-Japanese heritage, being the son of a Palau-based Japanese trader and his Palauan wife. Kyota is married and has six children and enjoys several hobbies, including fishing, reading, playing baseball, basketball, golf, chess and video games.

== See also ==
- Politics of Palau

== Bibliography ==
- Deimel, Claus, Jahrbuch der Staatlichen Ethnographischen Sammlungen Sachsen. Band 43, LIT Verlag Berlin-Hamburg-Münster, 2007, ISBN 3-8258-1484-X
