= List of cities, towns and villages in Palau =

This is a list of cities in Palau.

Palau only has two true cities, Koror and Meyuns.

Palau's towns and villages include:

1. Kloulklubed
2. Melekeok
3. Ngerekebesang
4. Ngermid
5. Tobi
6. Ollei
7. Imetang
8. Choll
9. Elab
10. Ngebuked
11. Ngkeklau
12. Ngetbong
13. Bkulangriil
14. Ibobang
15. Bkurrengel
16. Ngerkeai
17. Southwest Islanders Village
18. Imeong
19. Imelchol Village
20. Koska
21. Urdmang
22. Ngriil
23. Ngerulmud (national capital)

== List of cities, towns, and villages in Palau by population ==
Settlement	State	Population (2020)
Koror	Koror	9,524
Meyuns	Koror	1,631
Ngetkib	Airai	630
Kloulklubed	Peleliu	454
Bkulangriil	Ngeremlengui	239

== See also ==
- States of Palau
- List of cities by country
