= Ngardmau =

Coordinates: 7°36′N 134°33′E

- State
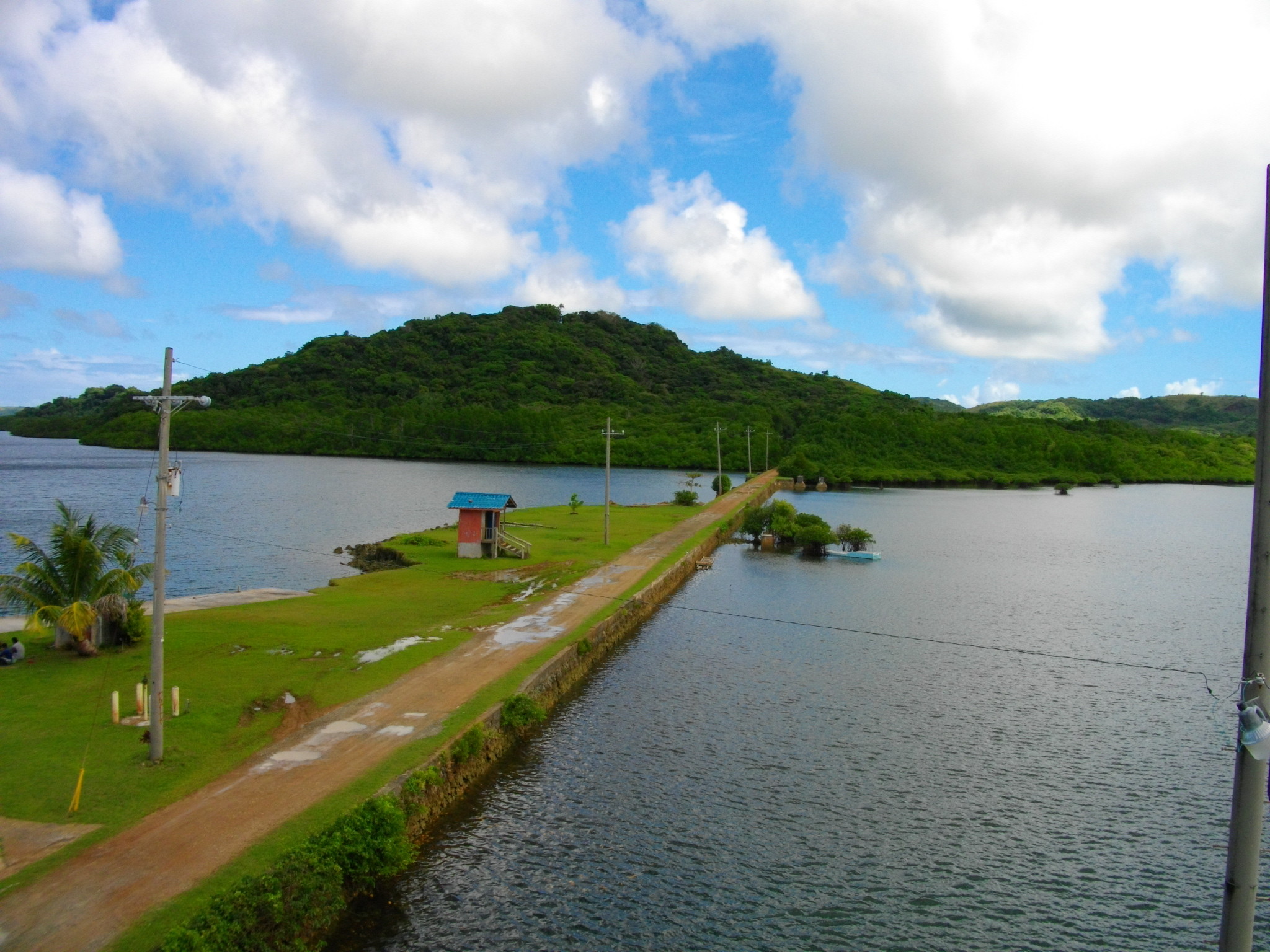

- Flag

- Location of Ngardmau in Palau
- Country: Palau
- Capital: Urdmang

Government
  - Body: Ngardmau State Legislature
  - Governor: Blesoch Aderkeroi

Area
  - Total: 53 km^{2} (20 sq mi)

Population (2015 Census)
  - Total: 185
  - Density: 3.5/km^{2} (9.0/sq mi)
  - Official languages: Palauan; English
- ISO 3166 code: PW-222

Ngardmau is one of Palau's sixteen states and is located on the west side of Babeldaob between the states of Ngaraard and Ngeremlengui.

== Geography ==
The total area of Ngardmau is 20.5 square miles (53 km^{2}). At the time of the 2015 census, 185 people lived in the state. There were 46 households situated in three hamlets: Ngetbong, Ngerutoi and Urdmau. The hamlets have no visible boundaries, but instead form one settlement.

Ngardmau is located on the northwest coast of Babeldaob and includes the long drainage basins of the Diongradid and the Irur Rivers. Ngardmau is bordered on the south by Ngeremlengui and on the east by Ngiwal and Ngaraard. The coast is lined with a thick fringe of mangroves. In the interior, rolling hills rise to the highest ground in Palau. Near the upper reaches of the Diongradid is a large waterfall. Forests cover the upper hillsides, but poor soil and past strip mining allow only scrub vegetation on many of the lower hills. The modern village of Ngardmau lies along the north side of the Diongradid on the lower hillsides upstream from where the river enters the mangroves. The modern village consists of three traditional hamlets: Urdmang, Ngerutoi, and Ngetbong. The hamlets span the low ridge east of Telong Hill between the river and the coast. Traditional boat docks are found along the north coast, and a modern jetty extends west into the lagoon from the west end of Telong Hill. A bladed road along the north side of the river connects the villages, and traditional paths extend outward to Ngaraard, Ngiwal, Melekeok, and Ngeremlengui.

Presently, the cultivated land in Ngardmau is mostly confined to gardens surrounding the modern village. Interspersed with these kitchen gardens are stands of agroforest which include coconut, and betelnut, breadfruit, almond trees, and banana plants. In and around many of the uninhabited villages are stands of coconut and betel nut palms, and occasionally patches of irregularly attended taro swamp gardens. Except for occasional forays to hunt pigeon or harvest special plants, little active use occurs for most of the Ngardmau interior.

The highest elevation on Palau is in Ngardmau. It is Mount Ngerchelchuus, which is slightly over 700 feet (210 m) tall. At the south base of this mountain is a forest with giant trees that shelter many species of birds.

== Culture ==
At least six traditional village sites lie within Ngardmau and there may be several more along the west coast between Irur and Ngeremlengui. The traditional villages are important symbols giving identity to families, clans and regions. Within the villages are numerous stone features of historical and traditional importance. Many of the stone platforms (odesongel) found there serve as clan cemeteries, and other stone features serve as shrines. The lagoon is an important resource, providing many species of fish and shellfish, and it was probably intensively exploited in prehistoric times. There are taro swamp gardens near the traditional villages, with garden plots and terraced hillsides surrounding most of the village sites.

== Demography ==
The population of the state was 185 in the 2015 census and median age was 31.4 years. The official languages of the state are Palauan and English.

In June 1972, the resident population was 265.

== Political system ==
Ngardmau has its own constitution, adopted in 1984. The state government was established in 1984. The state of Ngardmau, with population of less than 200, has an elected chief executive, the governor. The state also has a legislature elected every four years. The state population elects one of the members in the House of Delegates of Palau.

The traditional Ngardmau political and social system is very strong and is still being used today. The women's association called the "Ngaratumtum" and the men's association called the "Ngara Okelout" are organizations which help the women and men of Ngardmau follow their traditional way of life and values. "Bul" is a form of punishment that dates back a long time, used for those who got into trouble stealing or walking on the road past curfew time. "Bul" punishment fines are paid to chiefs of Ngardmau. Today both "bul" punishment and government laws are both used in Ngardmau to keep the state clean and free of crime.

The government of Ngardmau is also run by a governor and a legislative body called Kelulul Ngardmau. However Ngardmau's chiefs and their female counterparts are still in power, preserving their traditional way of life and values. Ngardmau is divided into three hamlets (Urdmang, Ngerutoi, and Ngetbong). These hamlets have chiefs and follow a hierarchical system according to clan. Beouch is a title for the highest chief and Ngirkebai is for the second high chief followed by several other titles.

== Chieftain ==
High Chief Beouch title is inherited through Ngedengoll ourrot.

== Tourism ==
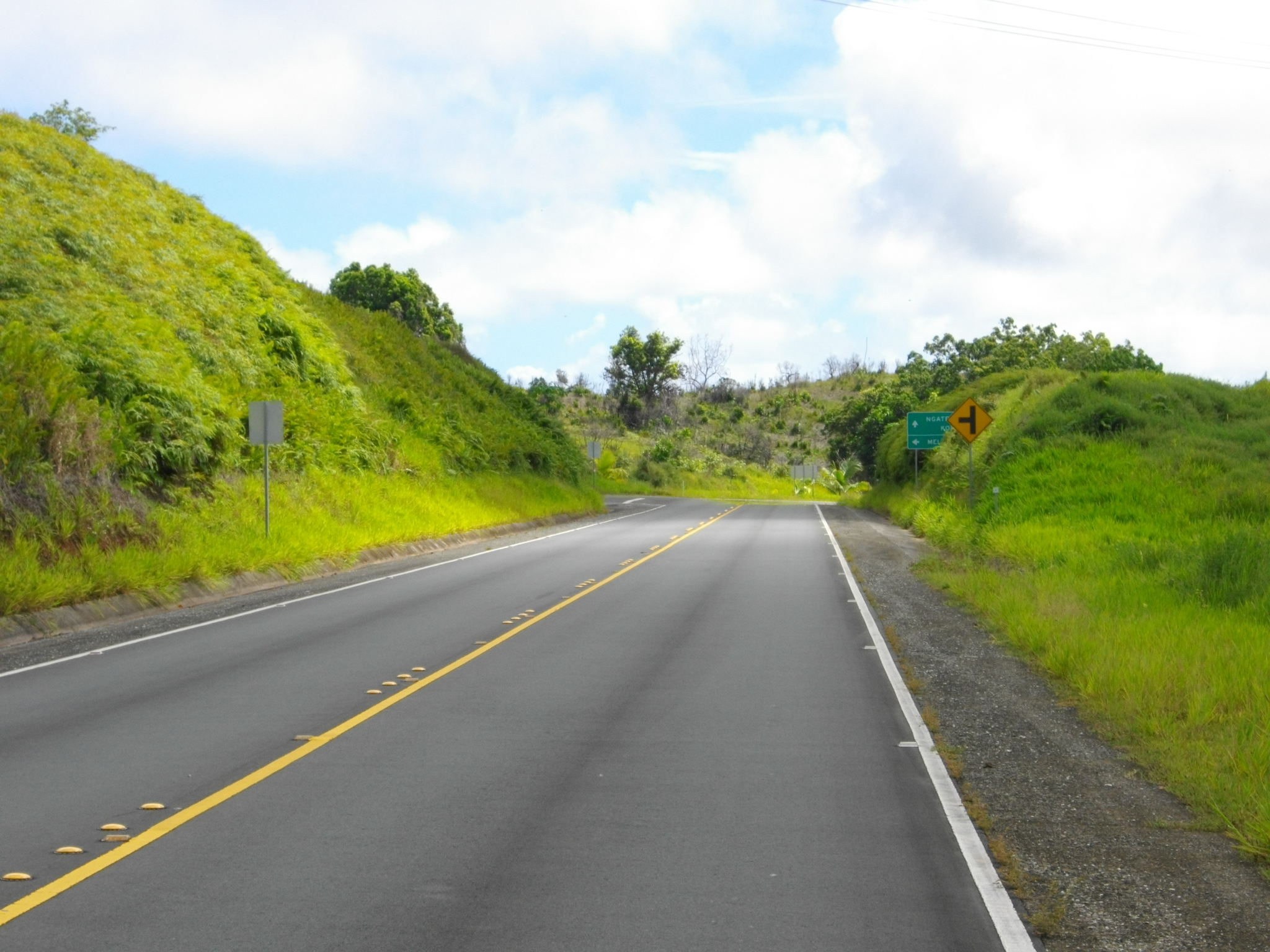
Palau Compact Road in Ngardmau State

In Ngardmau there are five retail stores, one laundromat, two gas stations, one construction enterprise, and one auto repair shop. Ngardmau has two tourist accommodations, a small apartment rental in the settlement and two bungalows in the woods above a scenic waterfall (Taki Falls), which is the main tourist attraction of Ngardmau.

Historic sites dating from the period of Japanese rule can be seen at several locations while driving on the mountainous natural resource of bauxite. Inner village, the cultural décors and monuments can be seen. Cultural sites are located in the town close to rivers such as Ngerurang's River. Ngardmau has the largest rain-forest in Palau where many creatures live. There are many rivers and waterfalls connected to each other.

The tallest water fall is called "Taki" which is commonly visited by tourists. Ongimi River is known to be crocodiles hatched. Crocodiles can be seen along the long river of Ngertebechel through the town, Did River, Sebeluu River, Ngerchetang Potato Lakes, and Ongimi River out to the Ocean. Ngerchetang Potato Lakes is known to have many crocodiles and home to many birds which lay eggs by the little ponds. Ngerhetang village also known for popular tree called betel nut or "buuch" in Palauan. At Irur, Ngerdekus, and Ngermasech there are old historic sites which are part of the many Ngardmau's legends.

Mount Ngerchelchuus, which is the tallest mountain of Palau, is located in Ngardmau where visitors can see the mountainous scenery including the largest rain forest located below of the Ngerchelchuus's mountain. Snorkeling is allowed in certain areas. Other areas close two ports of Ngardmau are known to have farm growing clams and native sea lives.

== Education ==
The Ministry of Education operates public schools.

Ngardmau Elementary School opened in 1966 in a South Seas Mandate school building previously for Japanese students.

Palau High School in Koror is the country's only public high school, so children from this community go there.
