= Kayangel =

- State
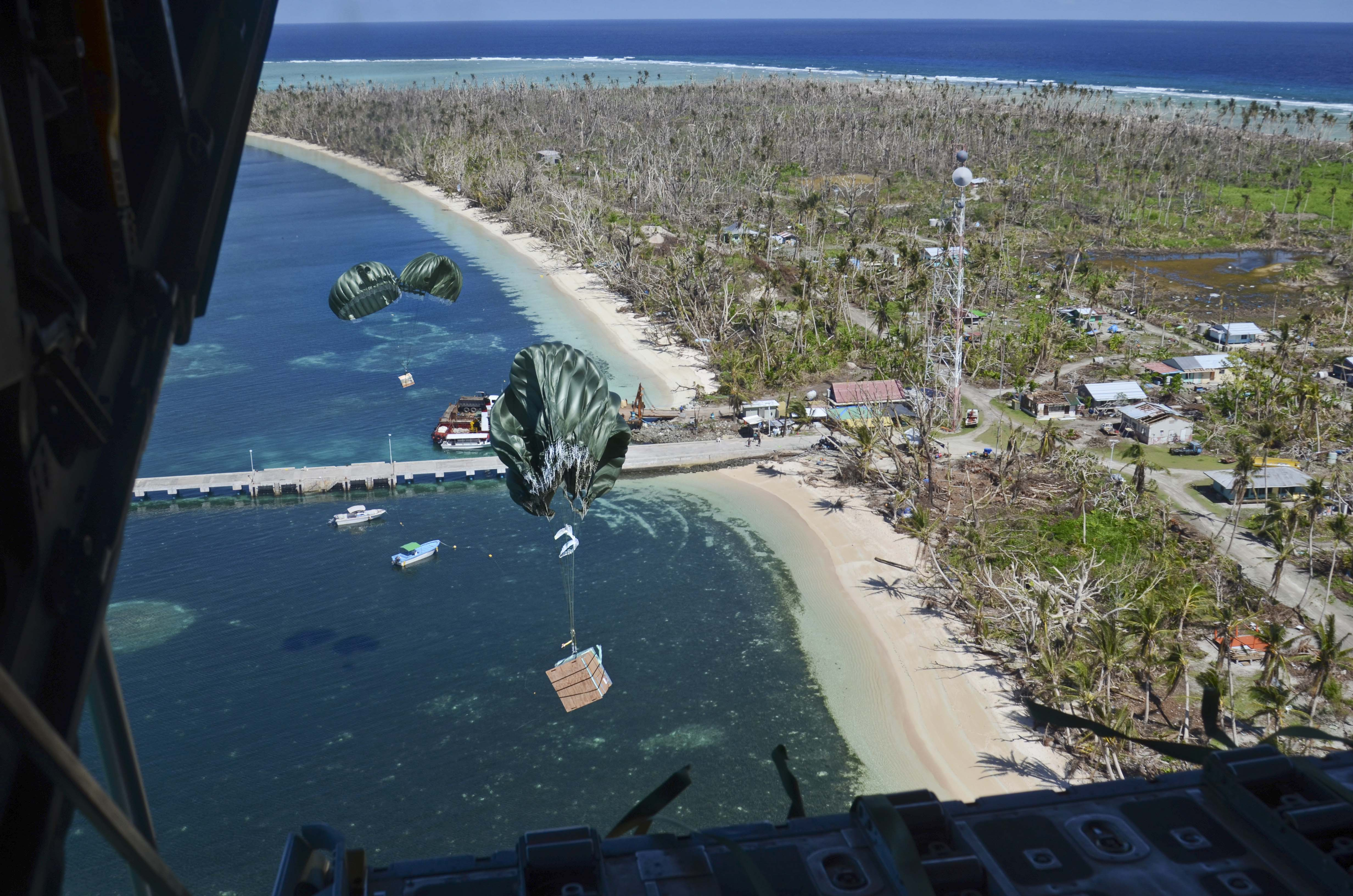

- Flag

- Location of Kayangel in Palau
- Country: Palau
- Capital: Orukei

Government
  - Body: Kayangel State Legislature
  - Governor: Richard Ngiraked

Area
  - Total: 1.4 km^{2} (0.54 sq mi)

Population (2015 Census)
  - Total: 54
  - Density: 39/km^{2} (100/sq mi)
  - Official languages: Palauan; English
- ISO 3166 code: PW-100

Map of Kayangel and Palau

Kayangel (Ngcheangel) is the northernmost state of Palau 86 km (53 mi) north of Koror. The land area is about 1.4 km^{2} (0.54 sq mi). The population is 54 (2015 census). There is one hamlet in the state - Orukei, which is also its capital. In 2020, Richard Ngiraked was elected governor of the state.

== History ==
The state was colonized by Spain from the late 16th century until 1899, when the territory was sold to the German Empire. German control lasted until the First World War, after which Japan administered the atolls. Following the Second World War, the United States governed the area until Palau became independent.

In January 2005, the Palau National Congress passed a joint resolution supporting a 2002 agreement between Kayangel State and Palau Pacific Energy, Inc. (PPE). The agreement granted the PPE exclusive rights to explore, drill, and produce oil in the surrounding marine area for a defined period. The national government had initially opposed the project on environmental grounds but later reconsidered after a 2003 petition from Kayangel residents in favor of exploration.

In 2013, Typhoon Haiyan caused extensive damage to the island, flooding all of Kayangel and destroying every home. Although no fatalities occurred, all 69 residents were affected by the storm

== Demography ==
In June 1972, the resident population was 290. More recently, the population of the state was 54 based on the 2015 census, and its median age was 37.5 years. The official languages of the state are Palauan and English. Rdechor is the title of the traditional high chief from the state.

== Political system ==
Kayangel has its own constitution which was adopted in 1983. The state government was established in 1984. The state elects its own Governor, who acts as the chief executive of the government. Kayangel also has a legislature elected every four years. The state population elects one member in the House of Delegates of Palau.

== Geography ==
The state consists of three atolls in different states of development:

Atoll	Land Area (km^{2})	Total Area (km^{2})	Coordinates
Kayangel	1.39	21.6	08°04′N 134°42′E
Ngaruangel	0.02	20.1	08°10′N 134°38′E
Velasco Reef	-	330	08°20′29″N 134°36′45″E
State of Kayangel	1.40	372	

== Kayangel Atoll ==
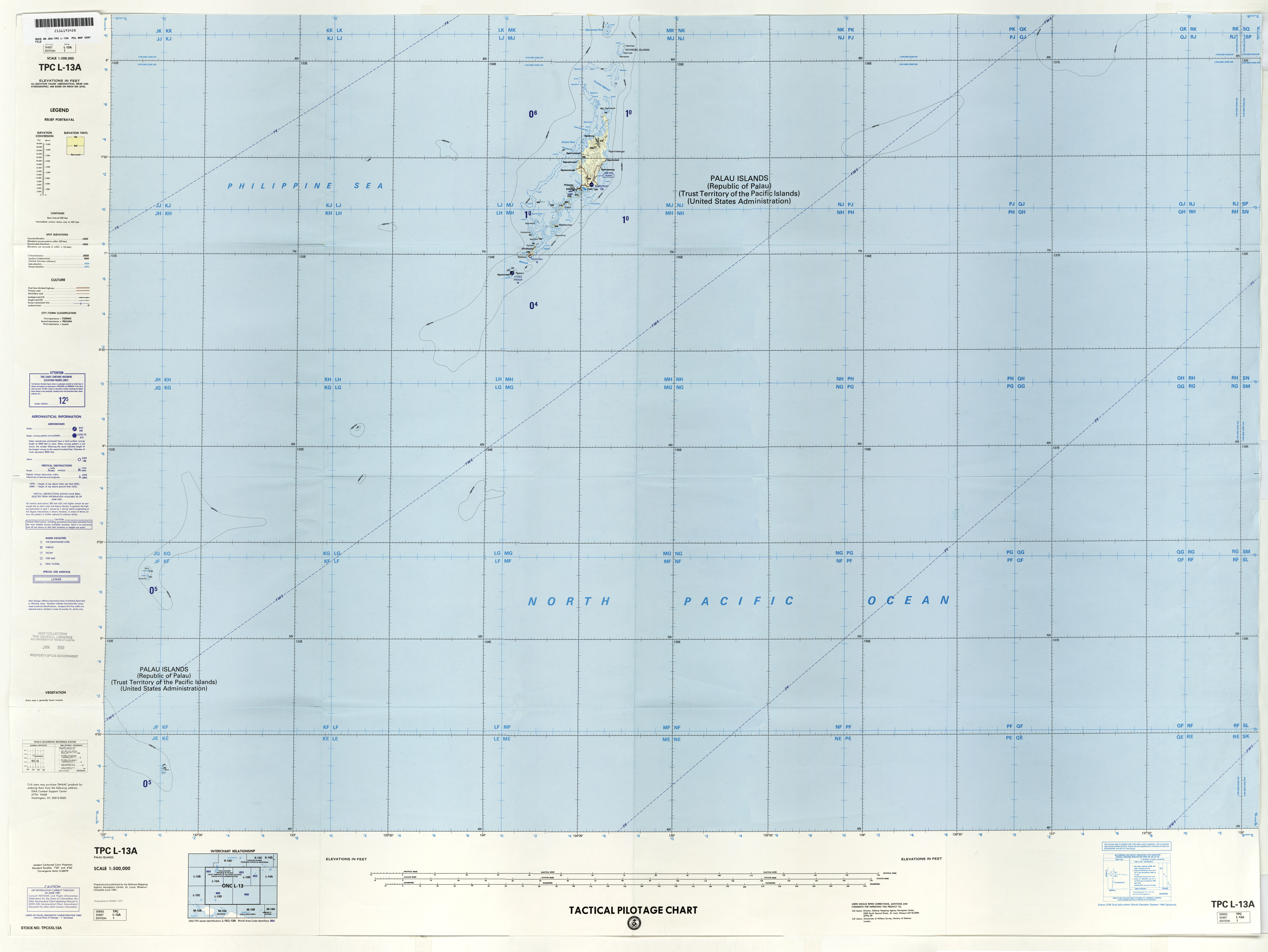
Map including the Kayangel Islands (DMA, 1991)

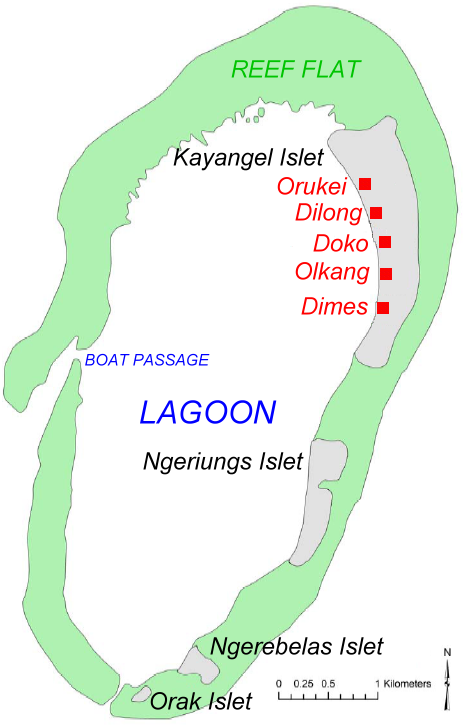
Kayangel Atoll

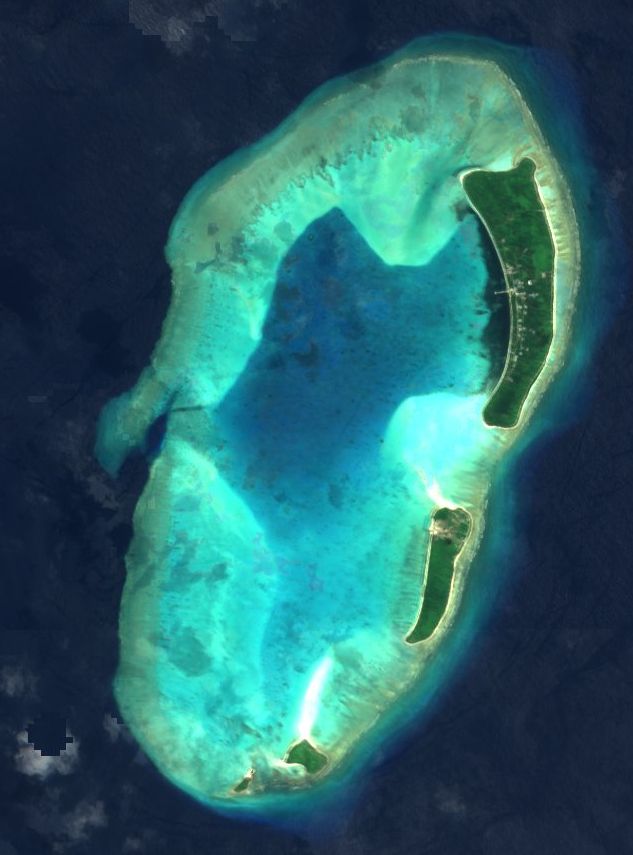
Satellite picture of Kayangel Atoll from Sentinel-2

Kayangel Atoll (Ngcheangel), the only inhabited atoll of Kayangel State, with most (99 percent) of the land area of Kayangel State, is located at 08°04′N 134°42′E, about 35 km (22 mi) north of Babelthuap island, the main island of Palau, but only 3 km (1.9 mi) north of Babelthuap's barrier reef. The atoll is about 7.2 km (4.5 mi) north-south, and 3.7 km (2.3 mi) wide, with a total area of 20 km^{2} (7.7 sq mi), including the lagoon. The lagoon has an average depth of 6 m (20 ft) and a maximum depth of 9.6 m (31 ft), and about 25 large pinnacles can be detected from aerial photographs. The bottom of the lagoon is largely sand. On the western side of the atoll, there is a small passage for boats into the lagoon, with a depth of only 2 to 4 metres (7 to 13 ft), called Ulach. Coral diversity and abundance are low in the lagoon. Large fish, dolphins and foraging sea turtles are common near the pass.

There are four densely wooded islets on the eastern and southern rim of the oval-shaped atoll, from north to south, are Kayangel, Ngeriungs, Ngerebelas and Orak.

=== Kayangel Islet ===
Kayangel Islet (also called Ngcheangel or Ngajangel), is the largest and only inhabited islet of Kayangel Atoll and Kayangel State. It is 2,570 m (8,430 ft) long north–south, with a width between 270 m (890 ft) in the south and 700 m (2,300 ft) in the north. The land area is about 98 ha (240 acres). There are five villages primarily oriented to the western shore (lagoon side). They stretch over 1.5 km (0.93 mi) from north to south and are not clearly separated from each other. The villages are very small by any standard, given the aggregate population of only 138. Together, they make up the state capital, Kayangel (Ngcheangel). From north to south:

1. Orukei
2. Dilong
3. Doko (with 130 m (430 ft) long pier to the west into the lagoon)
4. Olkang
5. Dimes

The only power on the island comes from solar panels or personal generators. There is one small school that goes from K-9th grades and a small library. The only shopping to be done on the island is from a small general store, otherwise it is what the islanders catch in the ocean or grow in the ground. There are several ways to get to the island. One is the island's speedboat that takes about two hours, but it is generally in for repairs. The more reliable modes are from either a local fisherman or a dive company that makes regular trips up to the island to dive off the reefs surrounding the island.

=== Ngeriungs Islet ===
Ngeriungs Islet, about 820 m (2,690 ft) south of Kayangel Islet, is 1,350 m (4,430 ft) long north–south, and has a width between 130 m (430 ft) in the south and 380 m (1,250 ft) in the north, which amounts to a land area of 27 ha (67 acres). There is a small campsite. The islet has been designated an Important Bird Area (IBA) by BirdLife International because it supports a large population of Micronesian megapodes.

=== Ngerebelas Islet ===
Ngerebelas Islet, close to the southern tip of Kayangel atoll, about 1,200 m (3,900 ft) southwest of the southwestern tip of Ngeriungs Islet, has a size of 400 m (1,300 ft) east-west by 370 m (1,210 ft) north-south, with a land area of 12 ha (30 acres).

=== Orak Islet ===
Orak Islet, at the southern tip of Kayangel atoll, about 290 m (950 ft) southwest of the southwestern end of Ngerebelas Islet, is 210 m (690 ft) long southwest–northeast, and 90 m (300 ft) wide. With an area of 1.5 ha (3.7 acres), it is the smallest of the four islets of Kayangel Atoll.

== Ngaruangel Reef ==
Ngaruangel (Ngaruangl) Reef, located at 08°10′N 134°38′E, is an incipient atoll, 8.7 km (5.4 mi) northwest of Kayangel atoll, and separated from it by Ngaruangl Passage, a very deep (629 to 786 metres (2,064 to 2,579 ft) at 2 km (1.2 mi) from each atoll) and 8 km (5.0 mi) wide passage. The atoll is 5.4 km (3.4 mi) long north–south, and from 1.8 km (1.1 mi) wide in the north to 3.7 km (2.3 mi) in the south, and about 3 km (1.9 mi) on the average. The total area including the lagoon is 15 km^{2} (5.8 sq mi). The lagoon is shallow, with an average depth of 6 m (20 ft), has about 115 pinnacle and patch reefs, and a boat passage through the northeastern part of the barrier reef. The lagoon floor is covered with thick sand deposits and thickets of staghorn Acropora. The reef is protected by Ngaruangel Reserve.

=== Ngaruangel Island ===
There is one small, barren and uninhabited islet, Ngaruangel Island, in the center of the eastern rim of the atoll, at its easternmost point. Ngaruangel Island is 200 m (660 ft) long north–south, and from 65 m (213 ft) wide in the south to 105 m (344 ft) in the north. There is a sand spit attached to the island, pointing southwest into the lagoon, 75 m (246 ft) long and 20 m (66 ft) wide. The total area of the island is 1.5 ha (3.7 acres).

The islet consists almost entirely of pieces of rough coral rock thrown up by surf. Most of the pieces are rough or sharp and are largely of the Acropora reticulata type, or of similar form. Sand and sandy gravel are limited to the lagoon side and the southern tip. The altitude is a little less than one meter above high tide. There is no vegetation on the islet. Animal life is represented by numerous marine crane flies. Terns are abundant.

== Velasco Reef ==
Velasco Reef, located at 08°20′29″N 134°36′45″E is a sunken atoll north of Ngaruangl Reef, rising steeply from the surrounding seafloor, 2,000 metres (6,600 ft) deep. It is not clearly separated from Ngaruangl Reef and appears as its large but submerged northern extension on satellite images. It extends more than 30 km (19 mi) to the north, and is up to 14 km (8.7 mi) wide, giving it an oval shape, covering an area of about 330 km^{2} (130 sq mi). Much of the reef is uncharted. The central depression (lagoon) is 31 to 55 m (102 to 180 ft) deep, while depths along the rim (outer edges) range from 11.9 to 22 m (39 to 72 ft) (generally 15 to 20 m (49 to 66 ft)), on which there are overfalls when the tidal currents are strong. Heavy wave exposure limits coral diversity and cover on Velasco Reef.

== Education ==
The Ministry of Education operates public schools.

JFK Kayangel Elementary School was built in 1965; initially students took classes in a bai. It relieved the schools in Babeldaob as Kayangel students previously attended those schools. Ngaraard Elementary School in Ngaraard formerly served Kayangel.

Palau High School in Koror is the country's only public high school, so children from this community go there.
