= Bkurrengel =

- Village
- Map showing location of Bkurrengel
- Coordinates: 7°26′46.5″N 134°28′34.5″E
- Country: Palau
- State: Aimeliik

Bkurrengel also known as Bkulrengel is a village in Aimeliik, Palau. It is located on the west coast of Babeldaob. The Palauan god Iechadrengel who created the sun and moon is said to have lived in Bkurrengel.

== See also ==
- List of cities, towns and villages in Palau
