= Ngebuked =

Village in Palau

Coordinates: 7°38′N 134°38′E

Ngebuked is a village on the west coast of Ngaraard State, Palau, where the Chief of Ngaraard, Maderangebuked is from. It has many stone pathways, ruins and graves scattered all over the surrounding hamlet. Its ruins consist of multi-leveled platforms where clans and families lived. At the center of the ancient site is the Bai ra Ngeruau, a large high platform where a bai, or men's meeting house, stood. The village even has a man-made channel from the sea for easy fishing and transportation access in ancient times.

Today, Ngebuked has a small population, because most of its inhabitants now live in the State of Koror. Ngebuked now has easy access to the newly made compact road. Ngebuked borders with Elab to the north, Ulimang to the southeast, and Ngkeklau to the south.
