= Mengellang =

Village in Palau

Coordinates: 7°42′N 134°38′E

Mengellang is a village in Palau and the capital of the state of Ngarchelong. The village is below the Baderulchau state mountains and is 900m west from Imetang.
