= Ministry of Education (Palau) =

Government ministry in Palau

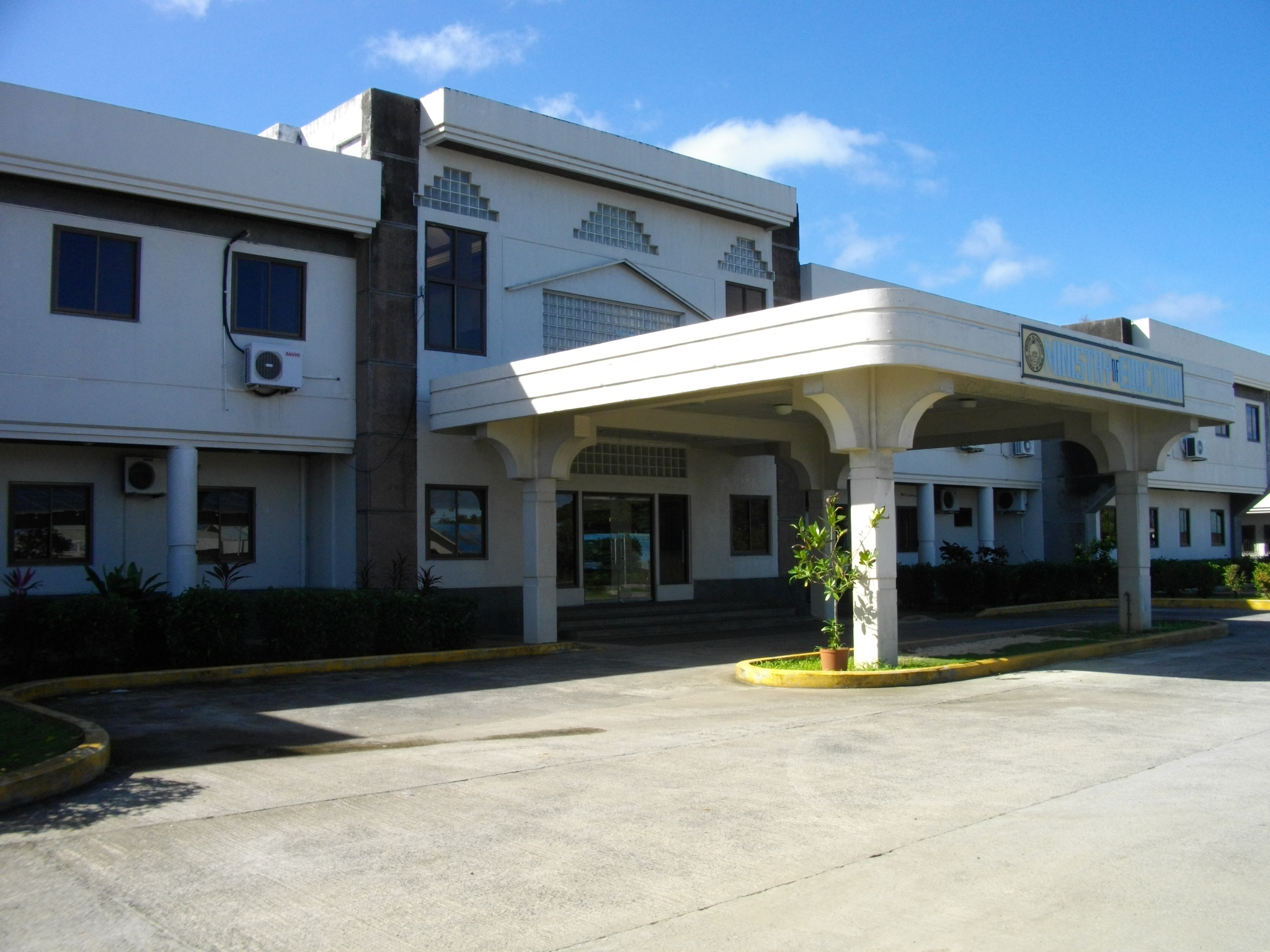
- Ministry of Education

Ministry overview
- Jurisdiction: Government of Palau
- Headquarters: Koror City; Koror, Palau
- Website: palaumoe.net

The Ministry of Education is a government agency of Palau, headquartered in Koror City.

It operates the country's public schools.

== Schools ==
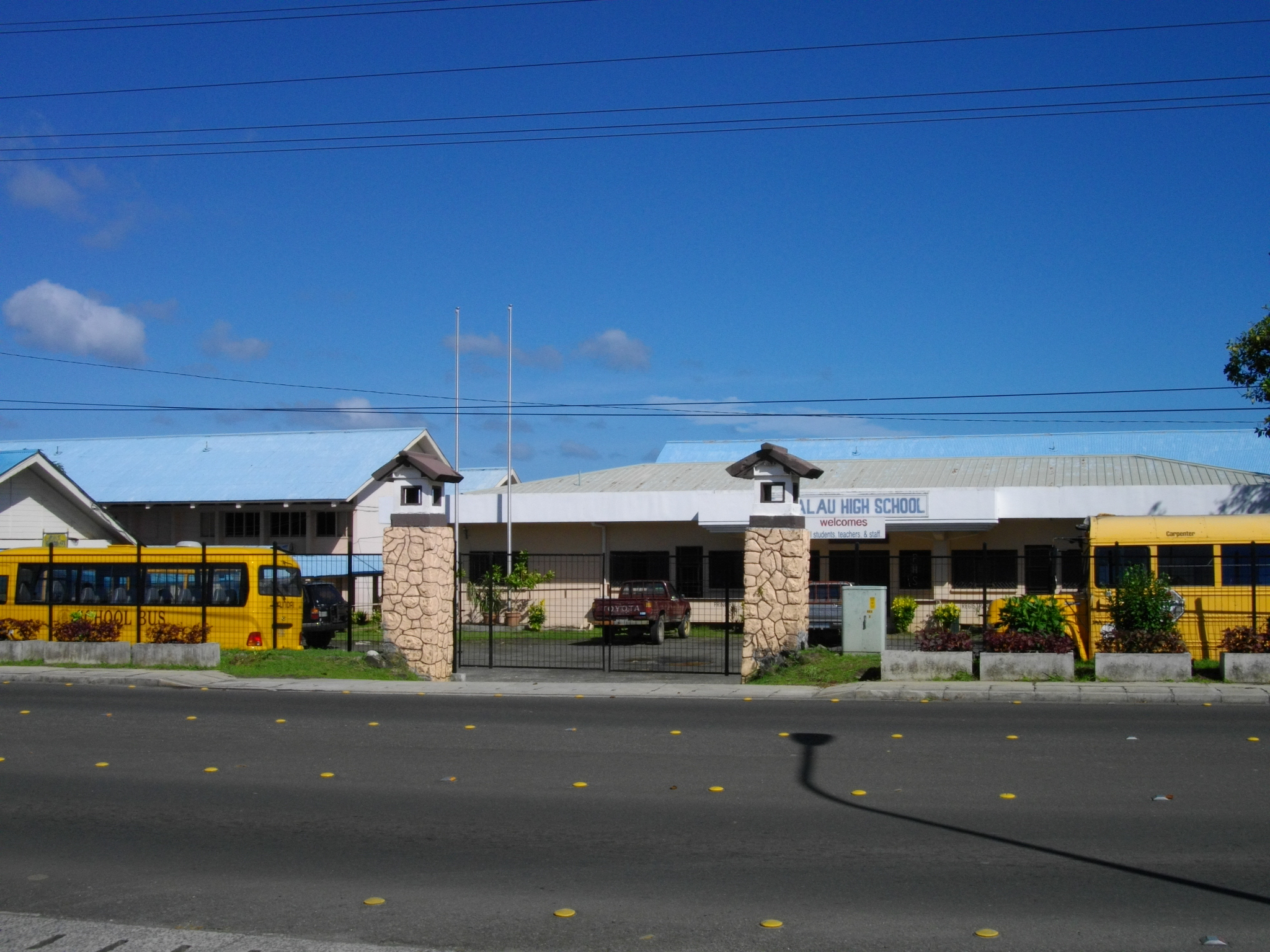
Palau High School

Palau High School in Koror is the country's only public high school.

Elementary schools:

- Aimeliik Elementary School - Aimeliik - It was established in 1948.
- Airai Elementary School - Airai - Opened circa September 1945, initially used the former Japanese Communications building.
- Angaur Elementary School - Angaur - It was established in 1945. A new building in another location opened in 1953. It moved to the original site in 1966 in a new building but it later moved back to the second site.
- George B. Harris Elementary School - Koror - Named after a member of the Land Registration Team of Palau, it was built in 1964 to relieve Koror Elementary.
- Hatohobei Elementary School - Hatohobei - It has one teacher and was established in 1962.
- Ibobang Elementary School - Ibobang, Ngatpang - Relieved Ngatpang Elementary School.
- JFK Kayangel Elementary School - Kayangel - Built in 1965; initially students took classes in a bai. It relieved the schools in Babeldaob as Kayangel students previously attended those schools.
- Koror Elementary School - Koror City - It opened in 1945 after World War II. The current building opened in 1969 as Typhoon Sally destroyed the previous one.
- Melkeok Elementary School - Melekeok - Uses a two-story building.
- Meyuns Elementary School - Meyuns, Koror State - It was built circa 1969 and expanded in 1973. It was established since Typhoon Sally destroyed Koror Elementary, where Meyuns students previously attended. The Trust Territory of the Pacific Islands administration was previously uninterested in building a school in Melyuns.
- Ngaraard Elementary School - Ngaraard - Established after World War II, circa 1947, using a school building opened during the Japanese South Seas Mandate rule. In addition to Ngaraard, it served Kayangel, Ngarchelong, and Ngiwal.
- Ngarchelong Elementary School - Ngarchelong - Established in 1947, it moved to its current site in Bai ra Mengellang from the original site in the community bai of Yebong hamlet in 1953. Its current building opened in 1964. It served students from Choll.
- Ngardmau Elementary School - Ngardmau - Opened in 1966 in a South Seas Mandate school building previously for Japanese students.
- Ngeremlengui Elementary School - Ngeremlengui - Opened in 1945, its permanent building was established around 1946.
- Peleliu Elementary School - Peleliu - Opened in 1946, and had its second building open in 1966, with the first still in use.
- Pulo Anna Elementary School - Pulo Anna, Sonsorol State - Built in 1972, it has one classroom and one teacher
- Sonsorol Elementary School - Sonsorol Island, Sonsorol State - Established in 1972, it has one classroom and one teacher
