= Ulimang =

- Village
- Location within Palau
- Coordinates: 7°37′N 134°38′E
- Country: Palau

The village of Ulimang is where the Ngaraard State Office (Ngaraard Branch) is located. Another state office branch is located in Meketii, Koror. Ngaraard Elementary school is located here. Ulimang's coast is an orange, sandy beach, and a small, high dock reaching out into the ocean. There is a large, red, public resting house near the dock. The villages of Ngesang in Elab are located north of this village. To the west is Ngebuked and to the south is Ngkeklau.
