= Ngereklmadel =

Ngereklemadel
- Town
- Location in Palau
- Coordinates: 7.48826°N 134.48562°E
- Country: Palau
- State: Ngatpang

Government
  - Governor: Francesca R. Otong
- Time zone: UTC+9 (Palau Standard Time)
- Area code: (+680) 535

Ngereklemadel is a hamlet and capital of the state of Ngatpang in Palau.
