= Ngiwal =

Coordinates: 7°33′N 134°37′E

- State
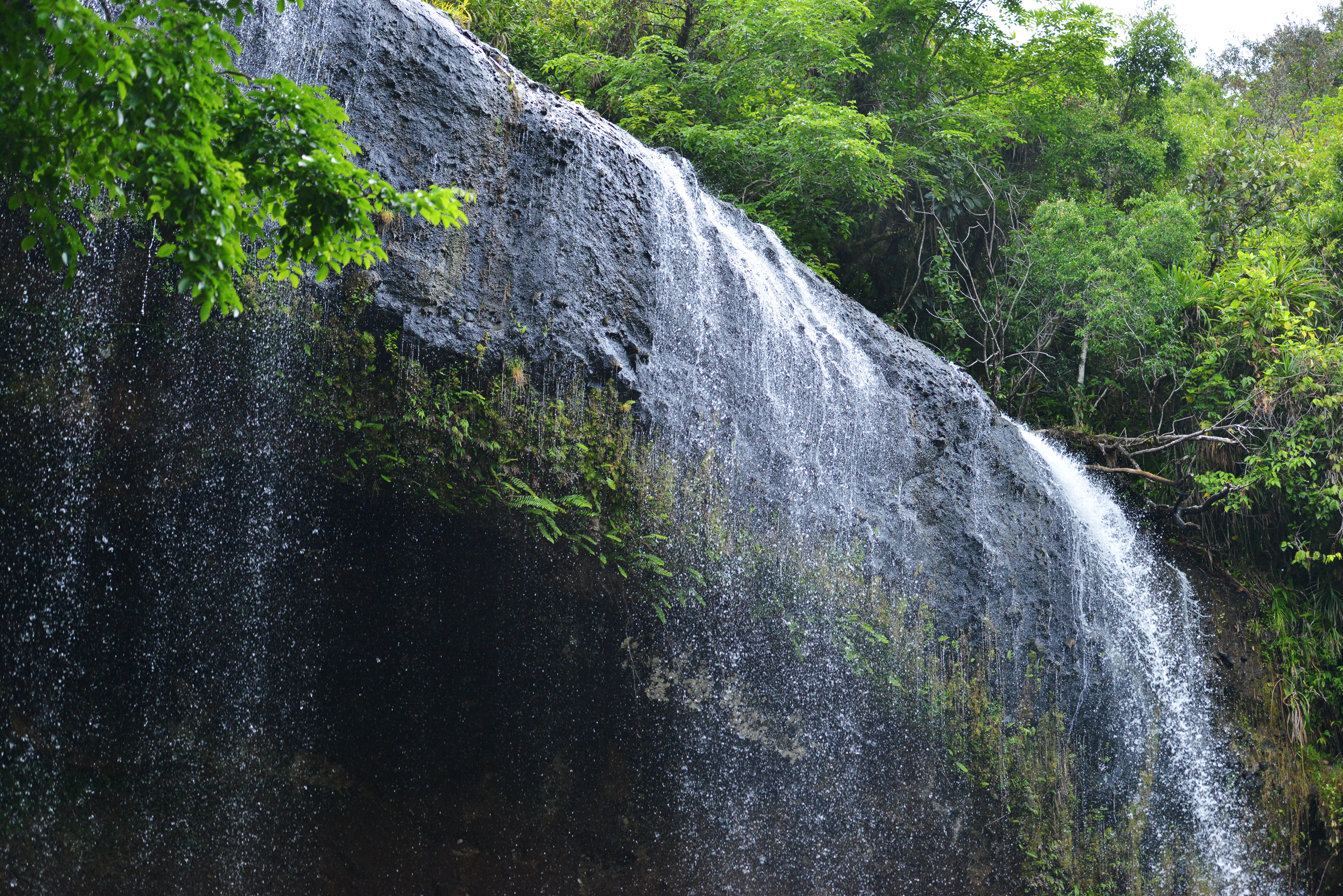

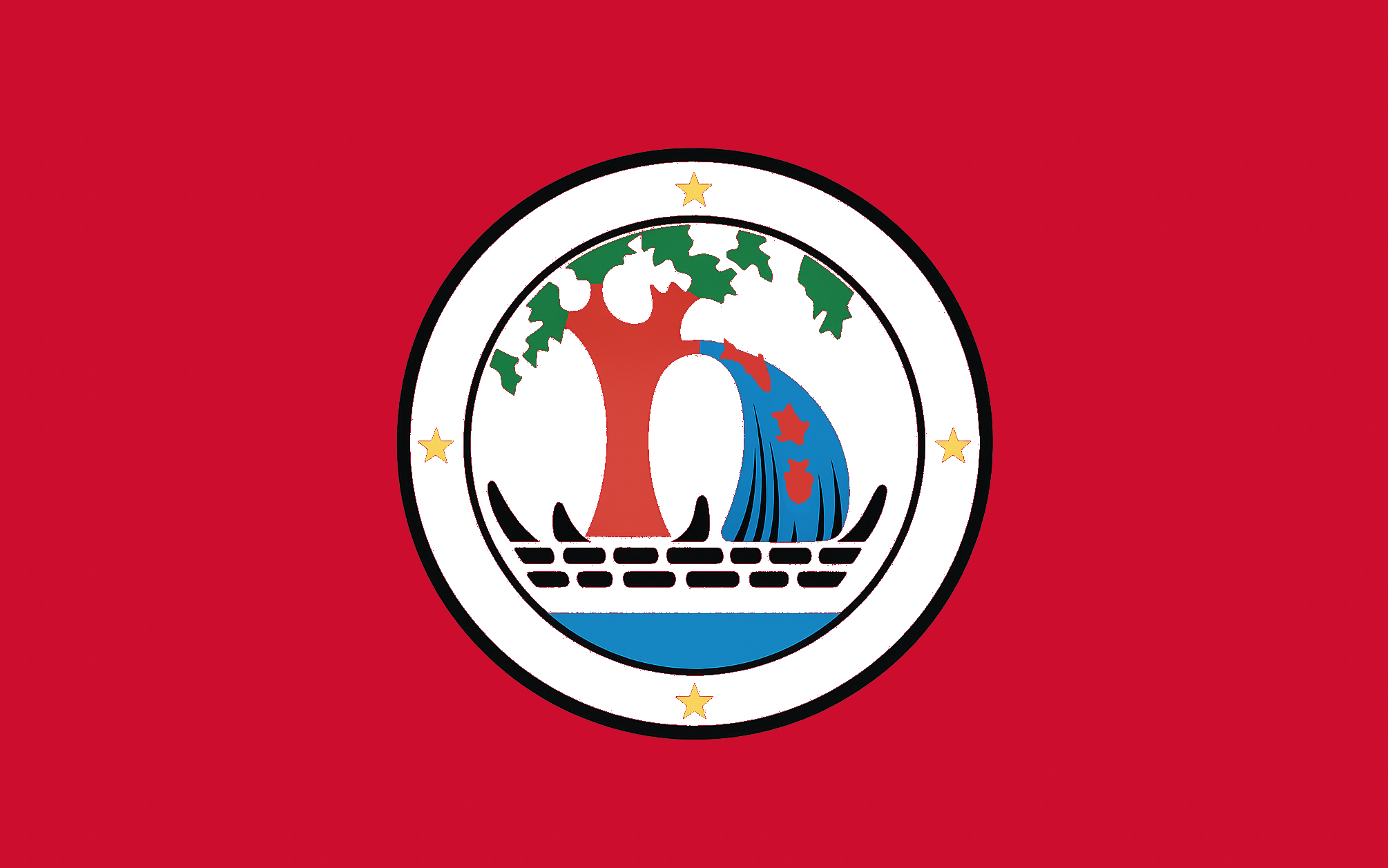
- Flag

- Location of Ngiwal in Palau
- Country: Palau
- Capital: Ngerkeai

Government
  - Body: Ngiwal State Legislature (Kelulul a Kiuluul)
  - Governor: Cisco Melaitau

Area
  - Total: 26 km^{2} (10 sq mi)

Population (2015 Census)
  - Total: 282
  - Density: 11/km^{2} (28/sq mi)
  - Official languages: Palauan; English
- ISO 3166 code: PW-228

Ngiwal is one of the sixteen states of Palau. It has a population of 282 (census 2015) and an area of 26 km^{2}.

On June 21, 2018, Japanese ambassador Toshiyuki Yamada gave Japan's multipurpose center to Ngiwal.

== Geography ==
Ngiwal is situated between Melekeok and Ngaraard on the north central east coast of Babeldaob Island. Ngiwal extends from the coast to the Rael Kedam and includes the drainage of the Ngerbekuu River. The Ngerbekuu River has its headwaters on the forested east flanks of the Rael Kedam and flows through a large northwest to southeast trending valley. A coastal ridge lies between the Ngerbekuu Valley and a broad sandy plain along the coast. The modern village of Ngiwal is located on a broad section of coastal plain north of the point known as Bkulatabriual and comprises the traditional villages of Ngermechau (south) and Ngercheluuk. The traditional villages were relocated to the coast in the mid-nineteenth century from their positions on the lower slopes of the coastal ridge.

Presently, most of the use of the land in Ngiwal is confined to gardens surrounding the modern village. Interspersed with these kitchen gardens are stands of agroforest which include coconut, betelnut, breadfruit, almond trees, and banana plants. In and around many of the uninhabited villages are stands of coconut and betelnut palms, and occasionally patches of irregularly attended taro swamp gardens. Except for occasional forays to hunt pigeon or harvest special plants, there is little active use of most of the interior of Ngiwal.

The state has an area of 26 km^{2} and is known for its beautiful beaches. To get to Ngiwal by boat it is necessary to do it at high tide, although there is a pier a couple of kilometers south of the village which can be reached at any tide. Its administrative center and main locality is Ngerkeai.

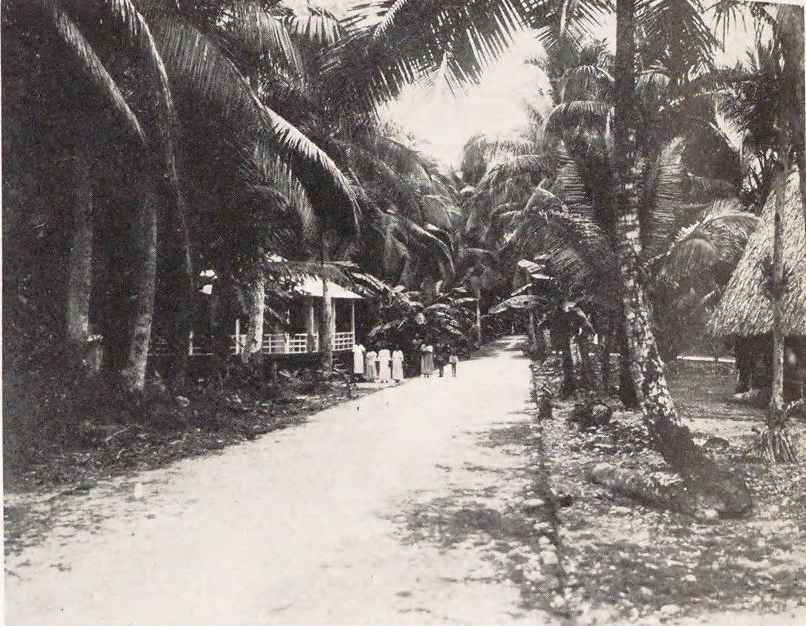
Ngiwal Town, Palau (from a book published in 1932)

The state has at least two protected areas, the Ngerbekuu Nature Reserve and the Ngemai Conservation Area.

== Demography ==
The population of the state was 282 in the 2015 census and median age was 36.1 years. The official languages of the state are Palauan and English.

In June 1972, the resident population was 419. The population was 223 inhabitants in 2005, increasing to 282 according to data from the 2015 census. Its inhabitants are mostly fishermen or public workers.

There are three small family shops, a primary school and a library, which contains a large number of children's books, a copy of all Palauan books and some books in Japanese and Spanish.

Uongruious is the title of the traditional high chief from the state.

== Political system ==
Ngiwal has its own constitution, adopted in 1983. The state government was established in 1983. The state of Ngiwal, with population of less than 300, has an elected chief executive, governor. The state also has a legislature, Kelulul a Kiuluul (KAK), elected every two years. The state population elects one of the member in the House of Delegates of Palau.

== Traditional villages ==
There are at least four traditional village sites within Ngiwal, and at least two village sites are located in the Ngerbekuu Valley. The site of Old Ngiwal is located on the west facing slopes of the coastal ridge at the end of a mangrove channel on the east side of the Ngerbekuu River near to where it empties into the large, shallow bay which separates Ngiwal and Melekeok.

The traditional villages represent important symbols giving identity to families, clans and regions. Within villages are numerous stone features with historical and traditional importance. Many of the stone platforms, odesongel, serve as clan cemeteries, and other stone features serve as shrines.

The lagoon is an important resource area which was intensively exploited prehistorically. Important resources include the many species of fish. Near the traditional villages are taro swamp gardens, and surrounding most village sites are garden plots and terraced hillsides.

== Education ==
The Ministry of Education operates public schools. Palau High School in Koror is the country's only public high school, so children from this community go there.

The Ngiwal state scholarship offers two scholarships: one for a graduating high-school senior who is a Palauan citizen and is a Resident of Ngiwal State, and one for a student at a college, university, or vocational school.
