= Ngriil =

Village in Ngarchelong, Palau

Coordinates: 7°41′17″N 134°37′59″E

Ngriil is a village on the north coast of Babeldaob, in the Ngarchelong state of Palau, on the southern border with Ngaraard state.
