= Airai =

- State

Other transcription(s)
  - Japanese: アイライ州
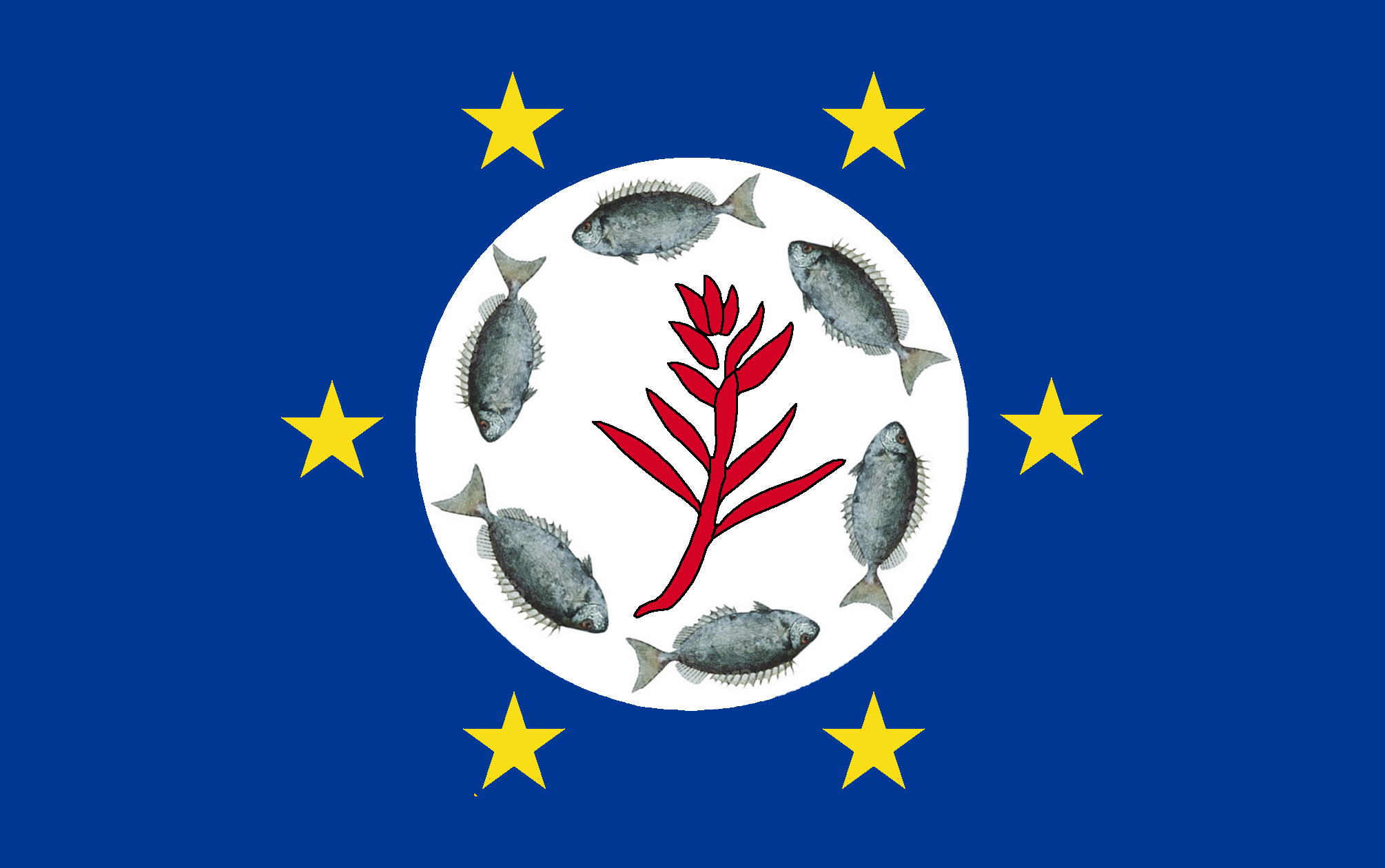
- Flag

- Location of Airai in Palau
- Coordinates: 7°22′N 134°33′E
- Country: Palau
- Capital: Ngetkib

Government
  - Body: Airai State Legislature
  - Governor: Norman Ngiratecheboet

Area
  - Total: 44 km^{2} (17 sq mi)

Population (2015 Census)
  - Total: 2,455
  - Density: 56/km^{2} (140/sq mi)
  - Official languages: Palauan; English
- ISO 3166 code: PW-004

Airai, located on the southern coast of Babeldaob island, is the second-most populous state of Palau, and the most populous on Babeldaob. It contains the country's chief airport, Roman Tmetuchl International Airport, and is connected by the Koror–Babeldaob Bridge to nearby Koror Island.

== Geography ==
The state has an area of 44 km^{2} (17 mi^{2}), and a total population of 2,455 as of 2015 Census, the second largest in the country.

Airai, located in the southeast corner of Babeldaob, includes a large area in the interior, a thick fringe of mangroves, and several limestone rock islands extending out of the mangroves into the lagoon. At the southeast corner is the large and shallow Airai Bay. The interior and southeast part of the state is drained by the Ngerikiil River, with its tributaries including the Kmekumer and Chedeng. This drainage is one of the largest in Palau. The Ngerimel River, which supplies water for Airai and Koror from a reservoir, occupies a small drainage on the west side of Rois Tungd in the south central part of the state. The drainages along the east and west coast are generally short and steep. A line of low hills parallels the coast. Inland from these hills are rolling hills which rise to the Rael Kedam, the central ridge system on Babeldaob. The Rael Kedam begins at Ngetkib village and extends north through Rois Tungd and Rois Ngesibang to the boundary with Aimeliik. From here, the Rael Kedam extends north through Rois Ngetechum to the corner of Aimeliik, Ngatpang and Airai, and then extends on to Rois Ormuul and the boundary with Ngchesar. From here, the northern boundary of Airai extends southeast across Rois Beng to the east coast. The inland hills are predominantly covered by forest, while much of the coastal ridge is covered by savanna and short, scrubby vegetation.

The modern villages of Airai include Ngetkib, Ngeruluobel, Ngerusar, Yelch, Airai, and Oikull. In addition, several homes and farms are located along the coastal road in the Ocholochol area and between Ngerusar and Yelch in Ngersung and Ngerullak. Yelch is a modern settlement surrounding the Airai Elementary School and Airai Community Center buildings. With the exception of Koror, Airai is the most densely populated state in Palau. Most of the population is located on the low, natural bench along the coast. The soil here is rich and supports a variety of vegetation and other resources.

Several different kinds of land use in Airai include private gardens, commercial gardens, commercial business, and municipal enterprises. Commercial business range in size from small stores to the large scale quarry operation near Ngeruluobel. Private gardens surround residences and villages, and interspersed with these are stands of agroforest which include coconut, betelnut, breadfruit, almond trees, and banana plants . Also, located along drainages are taro swamp gardens. According to informants, except for occasional forays to hunt pigeon or harvest special plants, there is little active use of most of the interior of Airai.

Airai is most notable for its bai (men's meeting house), the oldest one in existence, dating back 200 years. The turbulent rains of Palau did not treat ancient Palauan architecture kindly. Airai is more inland/mountainous-jungle and therefore more of a bedroom community of Koror.

== Demography ==
The population of the state was 2,455 in the 2015 census and median age was 33 years. Airai is also the name of the biggest town in the state, with a population of 920 people as of 2005. The town of Airai is the largest town in Palau outside of the state of Koror. The official languages of the state are Palauan and English. Ngiraked is the title of the traditional high chief from the state.

In June 1972, the resident population was 693.

== Political system ==
Airai has its own constitution, adopted in 1990. The state government was established in 1981. The state of Airai has an elected chief executive, governor. The state also has a legislature elected every four years. The state population elects one of the members in the House of Delegates of Palau.

== Villages ==
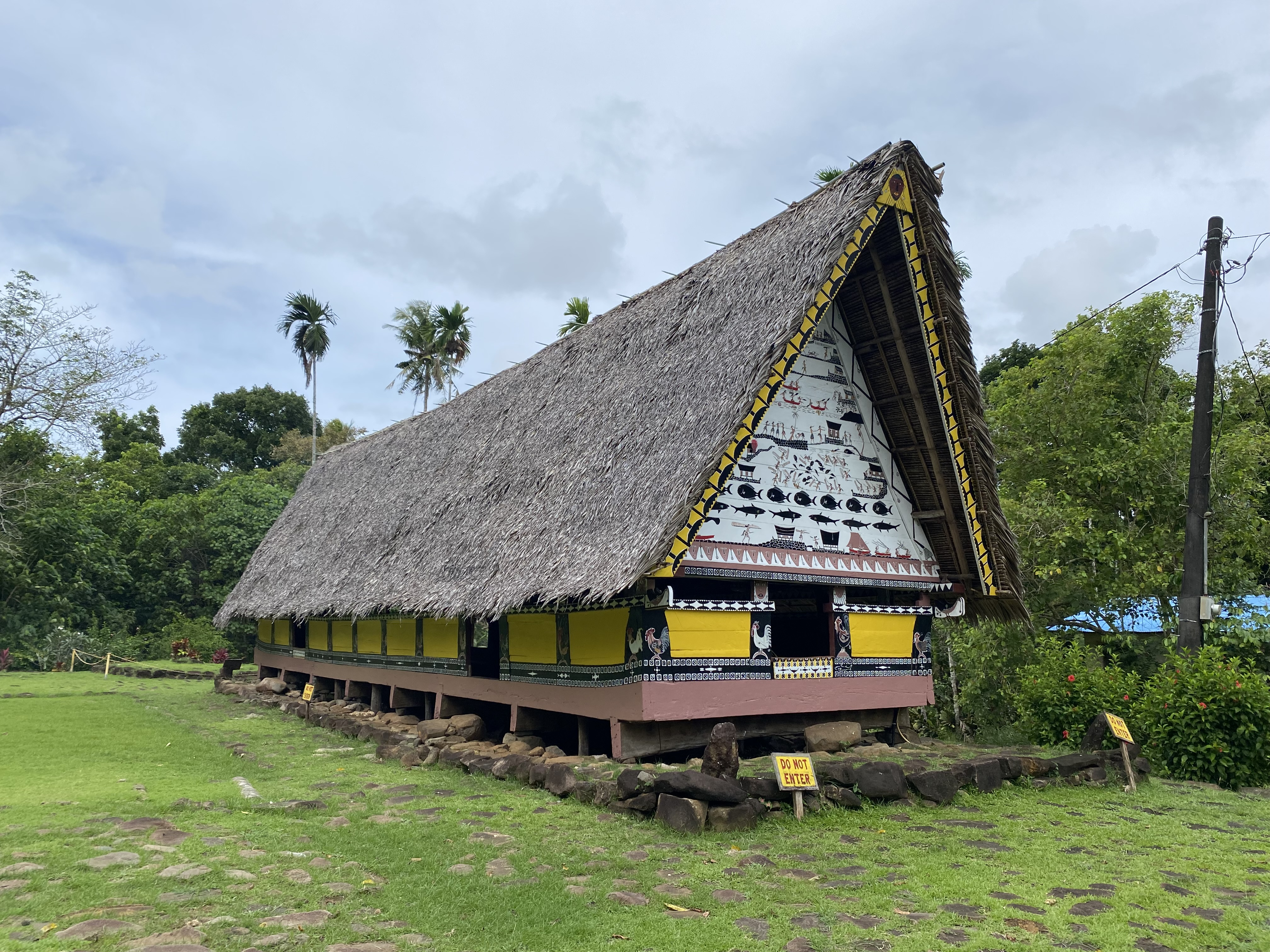
Airai traditional village meeting house

There are at least eleven traditional village sites in Airai: Ngetkib, Ngeruluobel, Ngerkedam, Ngerusar, Ngersung, Ngerullak, Ngerdiull, Airai, Oikull, Ngchesechang, and Ngerchemel. Ngerchemel is a village north of Ngetkib on the west side of Rois Tungd . It was destroyed by plantation operation during the Japanese era. These settlements were focused on the rich soil and mixed forest on a narrow strip of land along the coast and around Airai Bay. Within villages are numerous stone features with historical and traditional importance. Many of the stone platforms, odesongel, serve as clan cemeteries, and other stone features serve as shrines. The lagoon and Airai Bay are important resource areas, and were probably intensively exploited prehistorically. Important resources include mangrove and many fish species. In and around the traditional villages are areas of taro gardens and garden plots, and terraced hill sides are frequently found around village sites.

== Transport ==
Airai is connected to Koror by the Koror Babeldaob Bridge which crosses the Toach el Mid (channel) from Ngetkib to Ngermereues north of Ngerbodel. At the base of the hill on the Airai side of the bridge, the main road turns east and continues along the coastal bench to Airai Village. A second road extends north along the coast through the Ocholochol area following the route of a Japanese era road. The main road winds through the modern villages of Ngetkib, Ngeruluobel, Ngerusar, Yelch, and finally Airai, its terminus. At Ngerusar, the road branches north into the interior past the airport and the reservoir. This was the main road to Aimeliik until the coastal road opened in the mid 1980s. Just north of the airport, a side branch of this road extends east past the Palau Mission Academy, across the Ngerikiil River, and across rolling hills north of Airai Bay to Oikull. The airport, with its 7700-foot runway, is Palau's main link to the outside world. The airport was started during the Japanese administration, apparently near the end of the 1930s, and has been expanded considerably during the American administration.

== Education ==
The Ministry of Education operates public schools.

Airai Elementary School opened circa September 1945. It initially used the former Japanese Communications building.

Palau High School in Koror is the country's only public high school, so children from this community go there.

== See also ==
- DePaiva family murders – Brazilian missionary family murdered in Airai in December 2003.
