= Flags of the states of Palau =

State flags of Palau

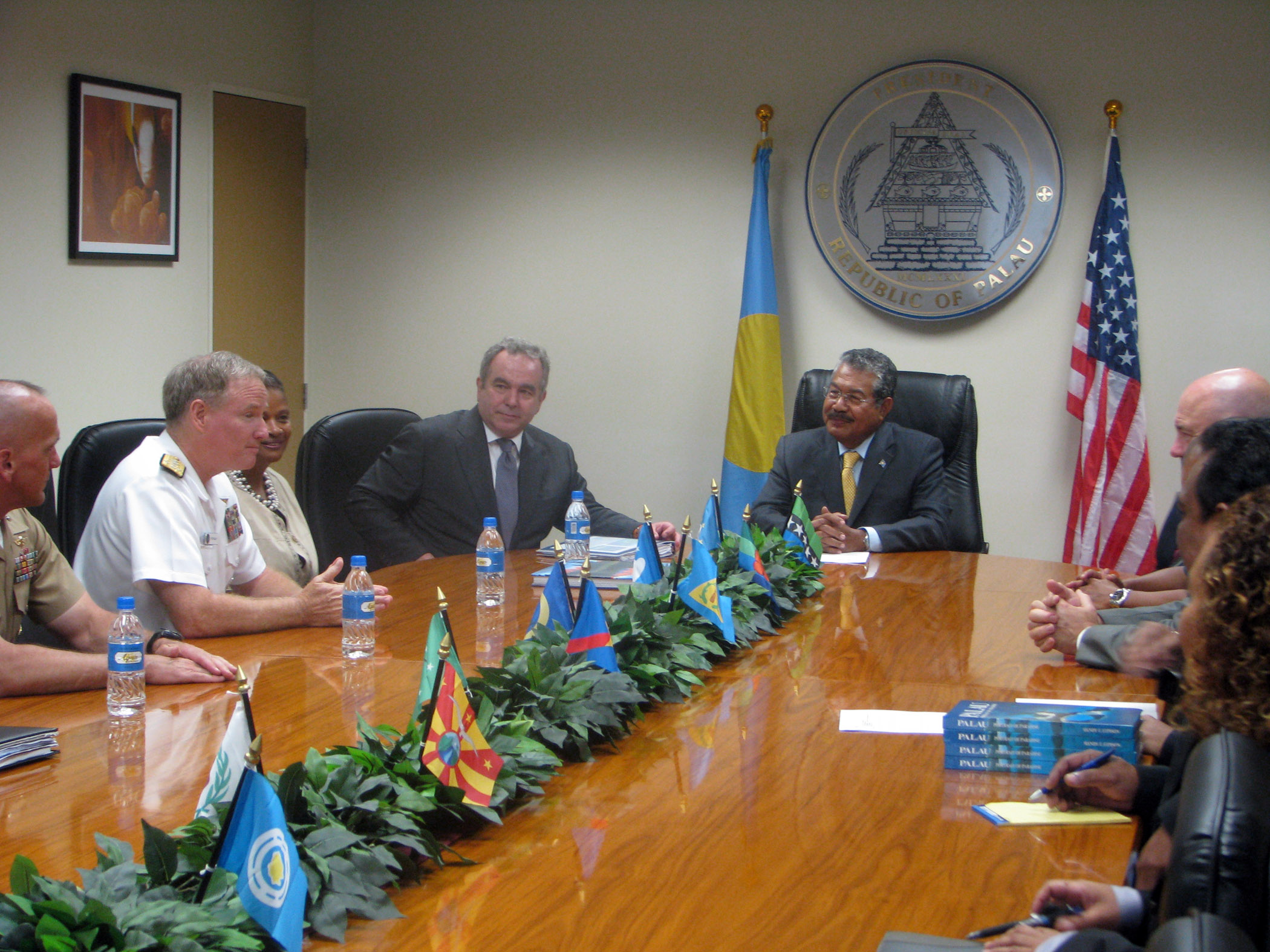
The state flags during a meeting between Patrick M. Walsh and President Johnson Toribiong in 2011

Palau has flags for its sixteen states.

State	Flag	Description
Aimeliik		The five stars represent the five hamlets of Aimeliik. The green stripe represents Aimeliik's rainforest, the black stripe represents the fact that it was not conquered and the blue represents Aimeliik's large fishing area.
Airai		The blue background represents the ocean and the white circle represents peace. The six stars stand for the six hamlets of Airai and the six fish for the six chiefs. In the centre is a ti plant.
Angaur		The four stripes stand for the four hamlets of Angaur. In the center is a kelau flower.
Hatohobei		The stars represent the three islands that make up the state. The clam shell represents Romohparuh, the first person on Hatohobei, who claimed ownership of the island by burying a clam shell.
Kayangel		The flag is blue with a yellow triangle. It features an oar and two hibiscus vines.
Koror		Main article: Flag of Koror A dark blue field with a crescent moon, seven stars and a bai on top of ten stones.
Melekeok		The sun indicates that Melekeok is facing the east where the sun rises. The six sun rays represent the six hamlets of Melekeok. The bird, the 'Paluan money bird' or Bai-ra-Irrai (a Far Eastern curlew), is holding Palauan money known as chelbucheb.
Ngaraard		The star's five points represent the five hamlets of Ngaraard. Earlier versions of the flag had a blue background instead of purple.
Ngarchelong		The flag has eight stars representing the eight municipalities of Ngarchelong. Previous versions of the flag had seven stars. The flag has seven stripes representing the seven original municipalities.
Ngardmau		The three stars represent the three hamlets of Ngardmau. Inside the circle is a picture of Ngerdmau Waterfall and Mount Ngerchelchuus. On top of the cirlcle is a kedam.
Ngatpang		The flag consists of vines on a white background encircling a lamp made of clay. The three strands that hold the lamp represent the three hamlets of Ngatpang.
Ngchesar		The green background represents the jungle and the six stars represent the six hamlets of Ngchesar. In the center is the state's spirit god ochaio.
Ngeremlengui		The map in the center is the territory of Ngeremlengui. The linked chains represent the hamlets of Ngeremlengui.
Ngiwal		The four stars represent the four hamlets of Ngiwal. The picture represents the abundance of sea food.
Peleliu		The flag features the native bird belochel. The blue represents the ocean and the five stars represent the five hamlets of Peleliu.
Sonsorol		The blue background represents the Pacific Ocean and the four stars represent the four islands that make up Sonsorol. The boat represents the finding of the islands by the people's ancestors.

== See also ==
- Flag of Palau
