= Ngetkib =

City in Airai

- City
- Location in Palau
- Country: Palau
- States: Airai
- Time zone: UTC+9 (Palau Standard Time)

Ngetkib is a village in Palau, and the capital of the state of Airai. It has a population of 62.
