= Ngarchelong =

Coordinates: 7°42′N 134°37′E

- State
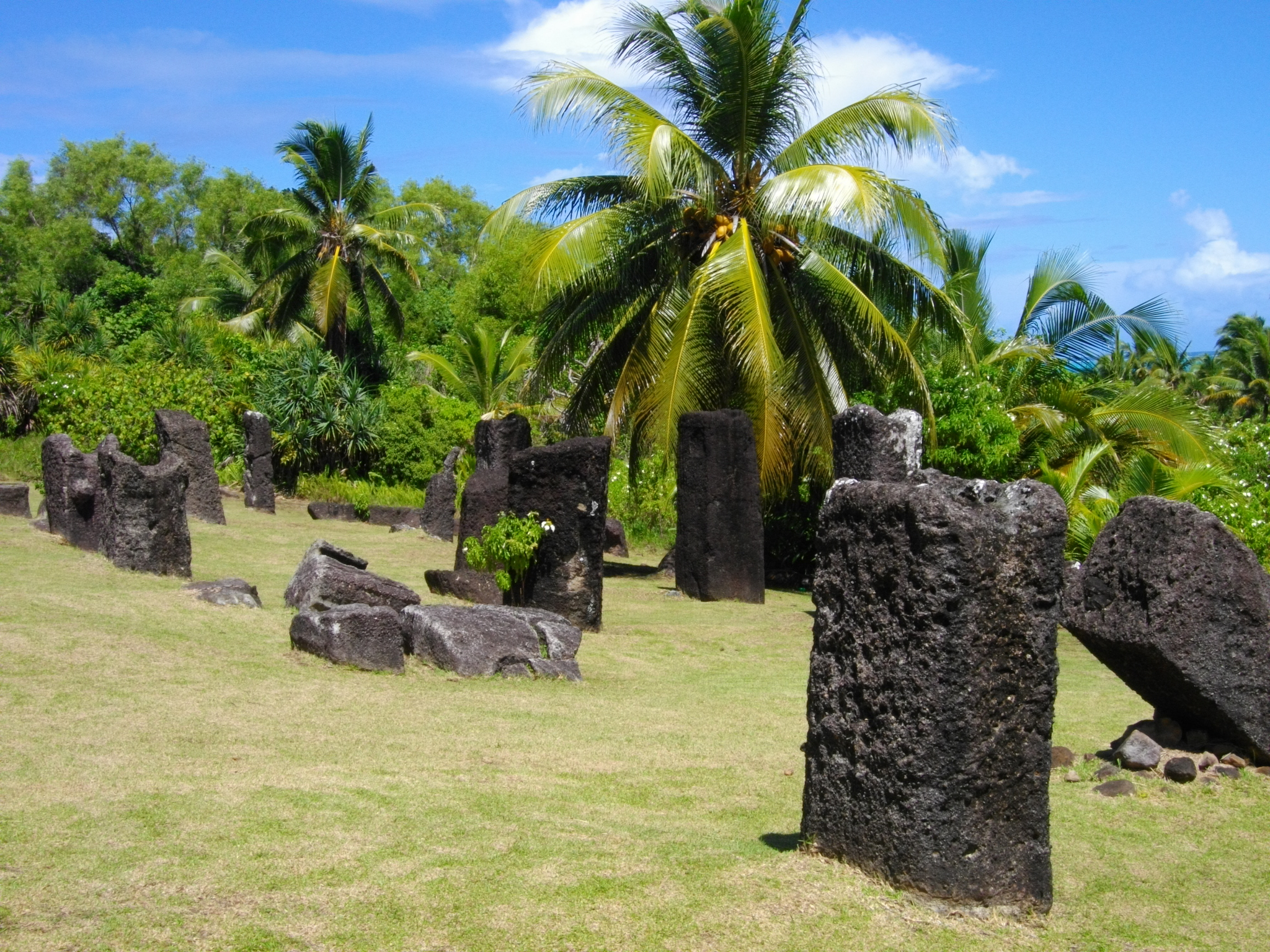
- Badrulchau Stone Monoliths

- Flag

- Location of Ngarchelong in Palau
- Country: Palau
- Capital: Mengellang

Government
  - Body: Ngarchelong State Legislature
  - Governor: Dwight Ngiraibai

Area
  - Total: 10 km^{2} (3.9 sq mi)

Population (2020 Census)
  - Total: 384
  - Density: 38/km^{2} (99/sq mi)
  - Official languages: Palauan; English
- ISO 3166 code: PW-218

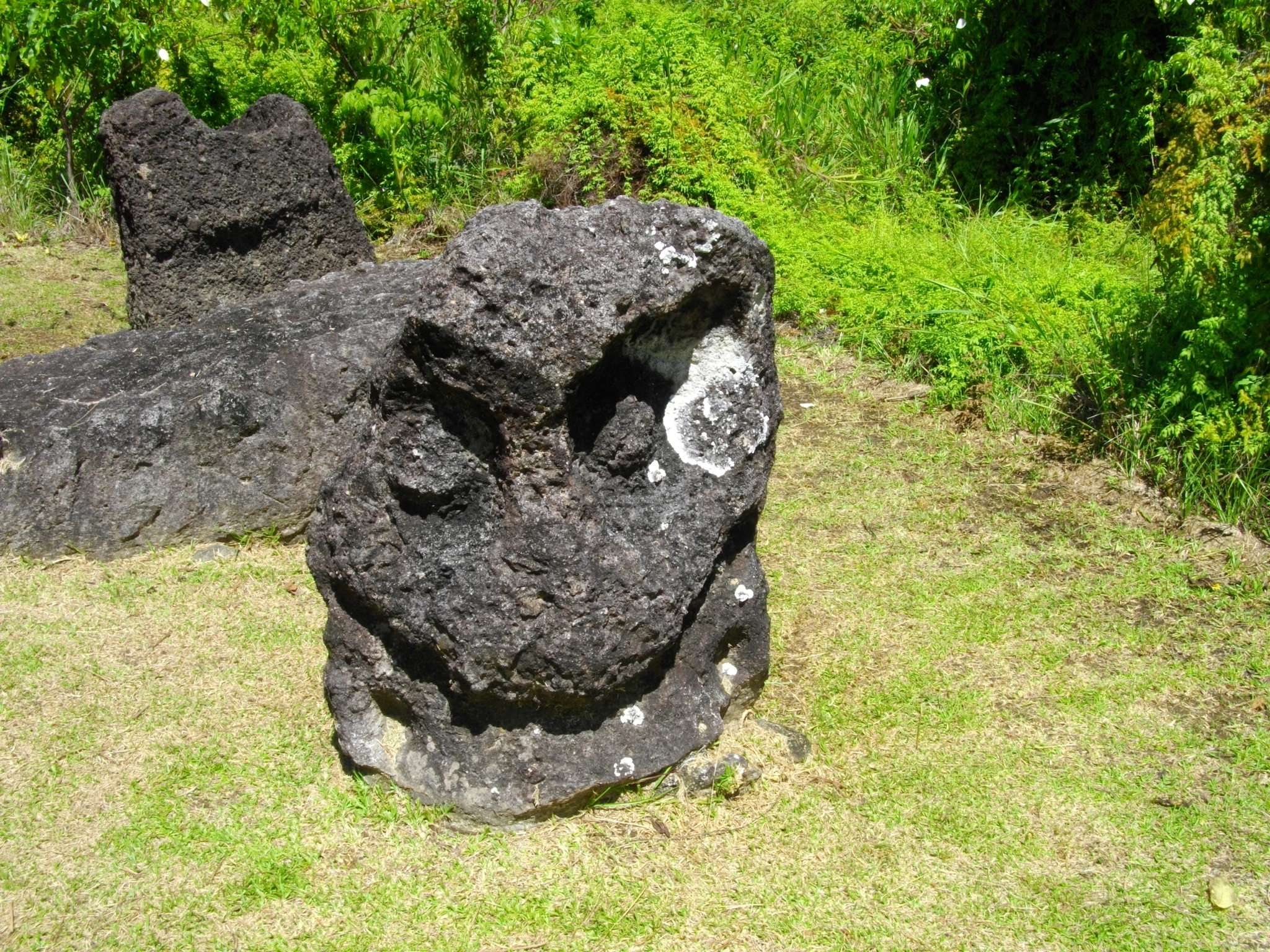
Palauan Stone Face at Badrulchau, Ngarchelong

Ngarchelong is a state in Palau, and the northernmost state on the island of Babeldaob, being at the northernmost tip of the island. Only the state of Kayangel is farther north.

== Demography ==
The population of the state was 384 in the 2020 census and median age was 37.2 years. The official languages of the state are Palauan and English. Uongerchetei is the title of the traditional high chief from the state.

The state has a population of slightly under 390 people (2020), making it the fifth most populated of Palau's sixteen states, although it is ranked thirteenth in land (with only about 10 square kilometers). The village of Mengellang serves as the state capital, and lies toward the south of the state. Mengellang and Ollei are the state's main population centers.

In June 1972, the resident population was 702.

== Geography ==
Ngerchelong is situated on the northern tip of Babeldaob Island. The land has low rolling hills with short drainages and is fringed by a thick belt mangroves. Ngerchelong extends north from the narrowest part of the neck on Babeldaob where it borders Ngaraard. Lower hillsides are generally covered with a lowland forest, and some of the higher hills at the north end of the state are forested, but much of the land is covered with grass and low scrub.

The modern villages of Ollei (north), Mengellang (southwest) and Ngerbau (east coast) are connected by a road now partially paved. This road will eventually become part of the Babeldaob Road connecting to Chol in Ngaraard.

Presently, most of the land use in Ngerchelong is confined to gardens surrounding the modern villages. Interspersed with these kitchen gardens are stands of agroforest which include coconut, and betelnut, breadfruit, almond trees, and banana plants. In and around many of the uninhabited villages are stands of coconut and betelnut palms, and occasionally patches of irregularly attended taro swamp gardens.

In addition, Ngerchelong includes two small islands, Ngerkeklau and Ngerechur, located one and two kilometers north of Babeldaob.

== Traditional villages ==
At least nine traditional village sites lie within Ngerchelong. The traditional villages represent important symbols giving identity to families, clans, and regions. Within villages are numerous stone features with historical and traditional importance. Many of the stone platforms, odesongel, serve as clan cemeteries, and other stone features serve as shrines. The lagoon is an important resource area, and was probably intensively exploited prehistorically. Important resources include the many fish species. Near the traditional villages are taro swamp gardens, and surrounding most village sites are garden plots and terraced hillsides. The names of the actual nine villages are Ngriil, Mengellang, Iebukl, Ngerbau, Ngebei, Ollei, Ngeremetong, Ngatmel, Ngeremetong. However, out of all of these villages, the "cultural sites" or the older villages are Ngeiungel, Ngriil, Ngatmel, Ngerkeklau and Ngerchur.

== Political system ==
Ngarchelong has its own constitution, adopted in 1982. The state government was established in 1982. The state of Ngarchelong, with population of less than 350, has an elected chief executive, governor. The state also has a legislature elected every two years. The state population elects one of the member in the House of Delegates of Palau.

== Culture ==
Ngarchelong is an important historical site and has undergone archeological excavation.

Ngarchelong is the site of ancient stone monoliths which are mysterious in origin. Traditional Palaun religion regarded these stone monoliths as sacred prayer ground. There are other stone monoliths located in and around the islands but one will not see as many as there are in Ngarchelong.

== Education ==
The Ministry of Education operates public schools.

Ngarchelong Elementary School, established in 1947, moved to its current site in Bai ra Mengellang from the original site in the community bai of Iebukl hamlet in 1953. Its current building opened in 1964. It also serves students from Choll. Ngaraard Elementary School in Ngaraard formerly served Ngarchelong.

Palau High School in Koror is the country's only public high school, so children from this community go there. However, not every child from the Ngarchelong community goes there. Some go to Belau Modekngei High School in Ngatpang as they believe in the Modekngei religion.
