= Bkulangriil =

- Village
- Map showing location of Bkulangriil
- Coordinates: 7°31′23.99″N 134°30′32.47″E
- Country: Palau
- State: Ngeremlengui

Area
  - Land: 0.82 km^{2} (0.32 sq mi)
- Elevation: 45 m (148 ft)

Bkulangriil is a village in Ngeremlengui, Palau. It consists of a roughly linear settlement, farmland, and a jetty.

The community is distinguishable for its heavily decorated church.

== Population ==
2005	2015
170	227
