= Ngetbong =

- Village
- Map showing location of Ngetbong
- Coordinates: 7°36′39″N 134°34′35″E
- Country: Palau
- State: Ngardmau

Area
  - Total: 0.65 km^{2} (0.25 sq mi)
- Elevation: 17 m (56 ft)

Ngetbong is a village in Ngardmau, Palau, near the bay Ngeriklreker. The Taoch ra Iwekei river runs through it.
