= Elab, Palau =

Village in Palau

Elab Chelab
- Village
- Location in Palau
- Coordinates: 7°38′31.05″N 134°38′30.79″E

Area
  - Total: 0.07 km^{2} (0.027 sq mi)
- Elevation: 3 m (9.8 ft)

Elab (Chelab) is a village in the state of Ngaraard in northern Palau, north of the villages of Ngebuked and Ulimang. It is the home to Ngaraard's only private Christian (Protestant) high school, Bethania Girl's High School in Ngesang, a small portion of Elab village. In Ngesang, there is a Catholic church located here and a beautiful, white and shady beach, with rock outcroppings.

On the other side of the outcroppings, there is a long beach that runs to the border of Choll and Elab. In Elab, the longest unbroken ancient stone path is located in Ngaraard. It connects the eastern coast of Elab to the western coast of Ngebuked.
