= Ngeremlengui =

Coordinates: 7°32′24″N 134°31′12″E

- State
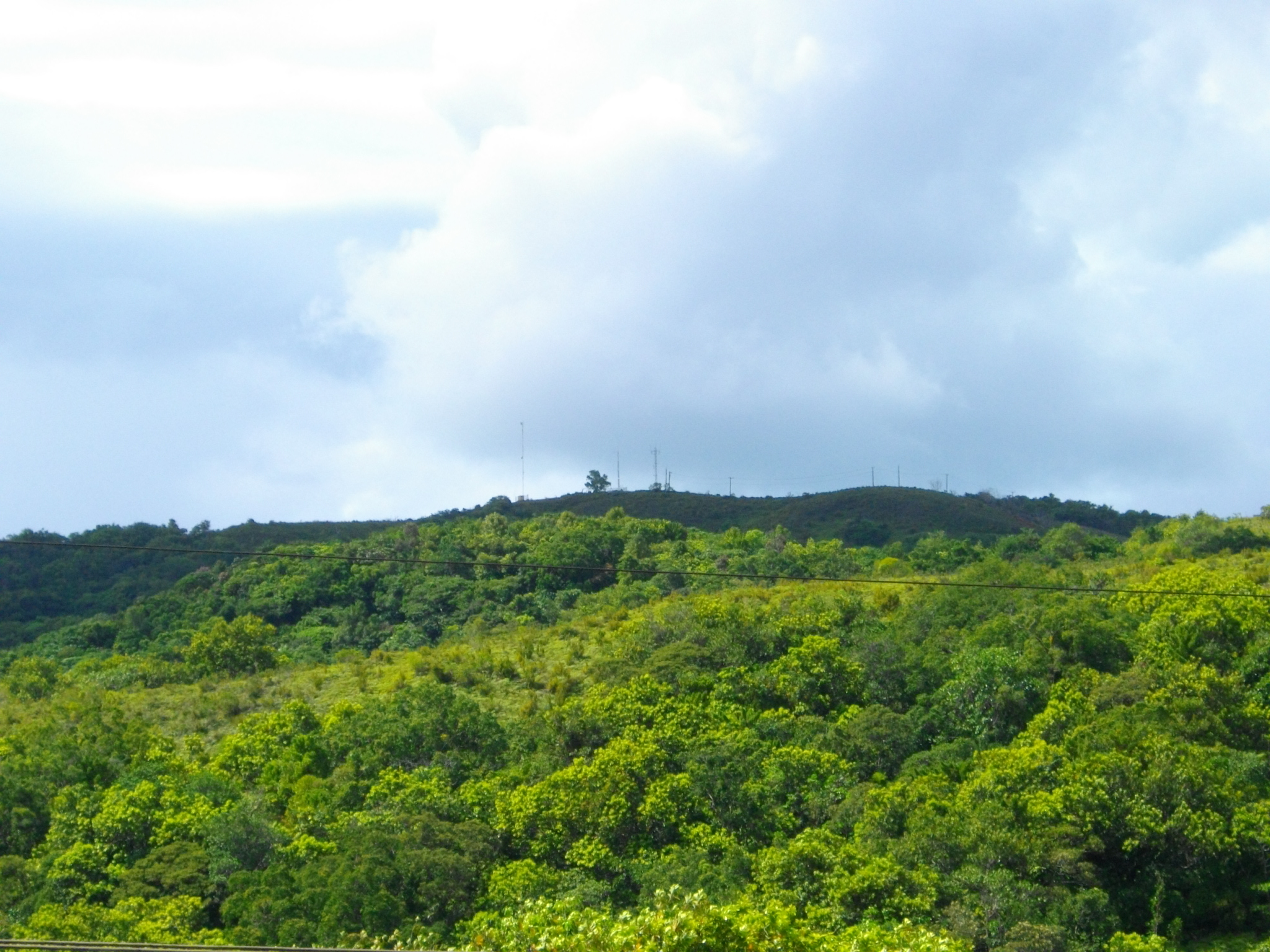
- Mount Ngerchelchuus

- Flag

- Location of Ngeremlengui in Palau
- Country: Palau
- Capital: Imeong

Government
  - Body: Ngeremlengui State Legislature
  - Governor: Mary Frances Ilolang Remengesau-Vogt

Area
  - Total: 65 km^{2} (25 sq mi)

Population (2015 Census)
  - Total: 350
  - Density: 5.4/km^{2} (14/sq mi)
  - Official languages: Palauan; English
- ISO 3166 code: PW-227

Ngeremlengui (also spelled Ngaremlengui) is one of Palau's sixteen states. It has a population of 349 (according to the 2020 census), and is just west of the capital in Melekeok state. Among the 16 states of Palau, it is the one with the lowest density, but the one with the most neighbor states. It’s also the seventh most populous state.

== Geography ==
Ngeremlengui, located on the north-central west coast, includes the large hill mass of Roismlengui and vast tracts of the interior along the Ngermeskang River. The modern villages of Ngeremlengui include inhabited settlements at Ngermetengel, Imeong, and Ngchemesed. Along the west coast between the inlet to Ngeremeduu Bay and the Chometubet River, the terrain is very rugged with some of the highest hills in Palau including Badechemetei. Ngermetengel is located on the north side of the Chometubet, and Imeong is located a short distance to the northeast on the Imeong River. Ngchemesed is located on the north shore of Ngeremeduu Bay. To the north, the Kaud River has been considered the boundary between Ngeremlengui and Ngardmau. Inland, the rolling hills rise to the highest points in Palau with elevations of 250m near the border with Ngardmau. In the east part of Ngeremlengui is the drainage of the Ngermeskang River, the longest in Palau. This drainage is separated from Ngermetengel and Imeong by a line ofprominent hills collectively known as Roismlengui. To the southeast is the Ngerbechederngul River, better known as the Yamato, which joins the Ngermeskang near its mouth at the northeast corner of Ngeremeduu Bay. During the Japanese administration, Ngeremlengui was connected by road to Ngatpang, Melekeok, and Ngardmau, but today most of the roads are impassable.

Thick fringes of mangrove swamp forest are found along the Ngermeskang and Ngerbechederngul Rivers in the northeast corner of Ngeremeduu Bay and along the northern coast. Along a broad belt of low hills inland of the mangroves are large areas of savanna with patches of forest. Further inland, large tracts of forest cover much of the interior part of the state. According to informants, areas of savanna along the Ngermeskang River were created recently in the construction of the Japanese Asahi Plantation. Presently, most of the use of land in Ngeremlengui is confined to gardens surrounding the modern villages of Ngermetengel, Imeong, and Ngchemesed. Interspersed with these kitchen gardens are stands of agroforest which include coconut, betelnut, breadfruit, and almond trees, and banana plants. In and around many of the uninhabited villages are stands of coconut and betelnut palms, and occasionally patches of irregularly attended taro swamp gardens. According to informants, except for occasional forays to hunt pigeon or harvest special plants, there is little active use of most of the interior of Ngeremlengui.

The capital of the state of Ngeremlengui is Imeong. Ngeremlengui is on the western side of Babeldaob, which is the largest island in Palau. Ngarelemgui is the largest of Palau's sixteen states in terms of land, and has an area of roughly 65 km^{2}. The Mount Ngerchelchuus is the Republic of Palau's highest point and is located at the border of the states of Ngardmau and Ngeremlengui, on the island of Babeldaob.

== Demography ==
The population of the state was 350 in the 2015 census and median age was 32.7 years. The official languages of the state are Palauan and English. Ngirturong is the title of the traditional high chief from the state.

In June 1972, the resident population was 472.

== Traditional villages ==
At least eighteen traditional village sites are found in Ngeremlengui, and there may be as many as forty. Of special note, four villages lie in a cluster around the modern settlement of Imeong. These settlements were focused on the rich soil with a mixed forest on a thin strip of land along the coast, on the north shore of the bay, and along the major rivers just above the reaches of the mangroves. The traditional villages represent important symbols giving identity to families, clans, and regions. Within villages are numerous stone features with historical and traditional importance. Many of the stone platforms, odesongel, serve as clan cemeteries, and other stone features serve as shrines. The lagoon and Ngeremeduu Bay are important resource areas and were intensively exploited prehistorically. Important resources include the mangrove crab, and many species of fish. Taro swamp gardens exist near Imeong and the other traditional villages, and garden plots surround most of the village sites.

== Political system ==
Ngeremlengui has its own constitution, adopted in 1983. The state government was established in 1983. The state of Ngeremlengui, with population of less than 400, has an elected chief executive, governor. The state also has a legislature elected every four years. The state population elects one of the members of the House of Delegates of Palau.

== Education ==
The Ministry of Education operates public schools.

Ngeremlengui Elementary School opened in 1945. Its permanent building was established around 1946.

Palau High School in Koror is the country's only public high school, so children from this community go there.
