= Choll =

Village in Ngaraard State, Palau

- Village
- Location of Choll
- Coordinates: 7.66833°N 134.63278°E
- Country: Palau
- State: Ngaraard

Area
  - Total: 1.55 km^{2} (0.60 sq mi)
- Elevation: 9 m (30 ft)

Choll (or Chol) is a village at the northern end of Ngaraard State in Palau. This village consists of a large, long, beach that runs along its entire east coast. The village has a series of ancient paths and platforms, similar to the rest of the villages in Ngaraard. There is also a large man-made channel that connects the village to the sea on the western coast. At the center of the village, along the compact road, there is a small marketplace with benches where one can purchase some village refreshments.

== Geography ==
The village of Choll is located directly adjacent to the village of Ngriil in Ngarchelong State. Choll has a small population, surrounded by dense forest and steep hills. A compact road was recently built through the center of the village.

== Education ==
The Ministry of Education operates public schools.

Ngarchelong Elementary School in Ngarchelong currently serves students from Choll.

Palau High School in Koror is the country's only public high school, so children from this community go there.
