= Imetang =

- Village
- Map showing location of Imetang
- Coordinates: 7°42′2″N 134°38′24″E
- Country: Palau
- State: Ngarchelong

Area
  - Total: 1.41 km^{2} (0.54 sq mi)
- Elevation: 9 m (30 ft)

Imetang is a village in Ngarchelong, Palau. It falls into the definition of a linear settlement as it is based along a roughly linear road, although it is not entirely straight. It contains the Ngarchelong Evangelical Church, the sole church in Ngarchelong.
