= Ngaraard =

Coordinates: 7°37′00″N 134°38′00″E

- State
- Flag

- Location of Ngaraard in Palau
- Country: Palau
- Capital: Ulimang

Government
  - Body: Ngaraard State Legislature
  - Governor: Sharp Sakuma

Population (2015 Census)
  - Total: 413
  - Official languages: Palauan; English
- ISO 3166 code: PW-214

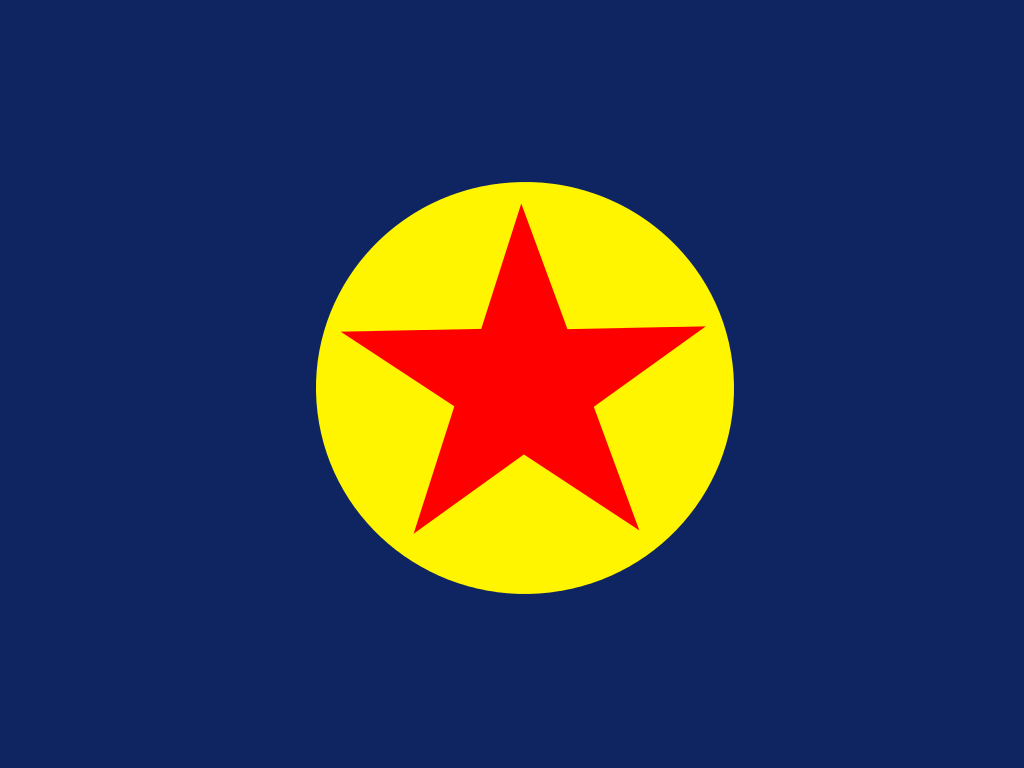
Previous Flag of Ngaraard

Ngaraard is one of the 16 states of the Republic of Palau, and was originally named Kerradel.

== History ==
Ngaraard's history can be divided into four eras corresponding to Spanish, German and Japanese domination up to World War II.

=== Spanish colonization ===
During the Spanish era between the 16th century and 1899 a priest named Father Luis lived in Elab teaching Christianity. However, the people from Ngaraard did not accept Christianity, so he went to Melekeok to Chief Reklai, but no one there accepted it either, so he left for Ngchesar. On his way to Ngchesar, he became lost and fell ill. Chief Reklai heard about Father Luis so he sent people to look for him. They found Father Luis very sick, and the Melekeokians cared for him until he died. He was buried crosswise, unlike everyone else at the Uudes burial ground.

=== German possession ===
During the German era, the Germans passed laws that Palauans must work to grow various plants, those refusing would be sent to Ngebuked for imprisonment. This is one reasons explaining the many coconuts in Palau. Germans also outlawed marriage and any religion except Catholicism. Some people of Ngaraard moved to Angaur to work in the phosphate mines. Later, doctors from Angaur traveled to Ngebuked because of an outbreak of leprosy, sending the sick to Melekeok for healing. The leprosy outbreak resulted in the deaths of many Palauans.

=== Japanese possession ===
During the Japanese era, there was a Japanese school in Ulimang, Ngaraard, offering primary education for first, second, and third grades. Students at the school came from Ngardmau, Ngerchelong, Kayangel and Ngaraard. Every morning students had assembly and they would bow to the Japanese as a sign of their respect and loyalty to the Japanese Emperor. Students found ignorant of their lessons would be punished by standing outside all day staring at the sun, or being forced to carry buckets of water up and down stairs for hours on end.

Ngaraard had two stores, the first selling sweets and clothing materials. The Nanboyeki store bought coconuts from all the islands. People lacking money could exchange coconuts for cloth. Many people from Ngaraard went to work at Angaur for phosphate mining; others went to Ngardmau to work on bauxite and some went to work for Nanboyeki. There were also Spanish priests in Koror who traveled to the islands propagating Christianity. When World War I started in Palau, people from Ngerchelong and Peleliu arrived in Ngaraard, where Taro Matsuda, Maderangebuked's younger brother, found families to host them.

==== World War II ====
When World War II began, most people fled to the jungles of Ngebuked. People wanting to go to the taro patch or go fishing needed permission from Japanese soldiers. When they finished working the taro patch or fishing they had to report to the Japanese soldiers, informing them they were finished. When American attacks began, people from Ngaraard were terrified because none had seen airplanes before. They called them "big bird with fire" (Meklou el kiued el ngarngii ngau el tuobed a ngerel). During that time, food ran short because the Japanese kept taking food from the Palauans. The people of Ngaraard left at night to find food because the American planes would not come, but they had to be careful because if Japanese soldiers saw them they would be killed.

The Japanese were ordered to collect Palauans and kill them. Japanese soldiers met with the Palau chiefs to discuss where to house the Peleliu people, because they planned to make Peleliu their military base. None of the chiefs wished to house the Peleliu people. Maderangebuked volunteered to take the Peleliu people, since Ngaraard had large taro patches and farms to produce food. This is why the Ngaraard people and Peleliu people have a special friendship.

There is Odesangel stone, this is an old name of Peleliu standing by Bai ra Ngaruau. The people of Peleliu who were in Ngebuked during the war carved the Odesangel Bad. They carved the stone as a memorial of the time they came out from hiding. "Odesangel Bad, 1945 28/9" is carved on the stone, showing that the people of Peleliu and those from Ngebuked and others that were hiding in the jungle emerged from their hiding place on September 28, 1945.

== Geography ==
Ngaraard has a tropical climate. The temperature ranges from a high of 83 °F to a low of 81 °F. Rainfall takes place from May to January and the heaviest rain is in June and July. The climate is dry from February until April.

Ngaraard is situated near the northern end of Babeldaob island where the land thins to a narrow neck before expanding at the border with Ngerchelong. To the south, along the borders with Ngiwal and Ngardmau, there are dense stands of forest on the rolling hills. Along the east coast, there are long stretches of sandy coastal plains while on the west coast, there is a thick fringe of mangroves. The modern villages of Ngebuked, Ulimang, Ngesang and Chelab form a cluster about halfway from north to south, with Choll and Ngkeklau at the northern and southern ends, respectively. The major rivers are the Desengong and the Ouang both flowing into the bay northwest of the state. Other drainages are short and steep. The Rael Kedam divides the state but becomes a low saddle at Ngebuked.

There are five hamlets in Ngaraard, including Choll, Elab, Ngebuked, Ngkeklau and the state capital, Ulimang, located on the eastern shore of the state. Previously, the capital of Ngaraard was the village of Ngebuked, where the traditional leader of the state, Maderangebuked, lived and reigned. There is a saying in Ngaraard, A rengud a dokngei, meaning "everyone works together as one in spirit and in the heart."

A system of trails links the modern villages, with short pieces of a bladed road in Choll and from Ngebuked to Ulimang. As of 1993, plans are being made for a road system through Ngaraard which will be a part of the major trans-Babeldaob road.

Presently, most of the use of the land in Ngaraard is confined to gardens surrounding the modern villages. Interspersed with these kitchen gardens are stands of agroforest which include coconut, betelnut, breadfruit, almond trees, and banana plants. In and around many of the uninhabited villages are stands of coconut and betelnut palms, and occasionally patches of irregularly attended taro swamp gardens. Except for occasional forays to hunt pigeon or harvest special plants, there is little active use of most of the interior of Ngaraard.

== Demography ==
The population of the state was 413 in the 2015 census and median age was 37.9 years. The official languages of the state are Palauan and English.

The population of Ngaraard has changed considerably over the years. In June 1972, the resident population was 1,063. In 1990, its population was 440 and in 1996, it decreased to 360. In 2000, it had increased to 638.

=== Villages ===
The inhabited villages of Ngaraard State include the following (from north to south): Choll, Elab, Ulimang, Ngebuked, and Ngkeklau.

There are many important places in the State of Ngaraard. There are the traditional village sites of Elab, Chetoilechang, Diong er Ngerchokl, Bai ra Ngaruau, Chelsel a Beluu er Ngebuked, Diong era Imeduurang, Ulimang. Ulimang is said to be the child of god Chuab. Other important places include: Head Start, the elementary school and Bethania High School, a hospital, Bai ra Rubak, the Ngaraard State Office at Koror, Bem Yore and the stores.

The lifestyle of Ngaraard has changed a lot due to the introduction of modern technology, including computers, telephones, electricity and televisions. Due to the construction of roads, the majority of people in the state now use cars for transportation rather than boats. However boats are still used for fishing.

== Political system ==
Ngaraard has its own constitution, adopted in 1981. The state government was established in 1982. The state of Ngaraard, with population of less than 450, has an elected chief executive, governor. The state also has a legislature elected every four years. The state population elects one of the member in the House of Delegates of Palau.

== Cultural background and organization ==
There are more than two dozen traditional village sites within Ngaraard. These traditional villages represent important symbols giving identity to families, clans and regions. Within villages are numerous stone features with historical and traditional importance. Many of the stone platforms, odesongel, serve as clan cemeteries, and other stone features serve as shrines. The lagoon is an important resource area, and was probably intensively exploited prehistorically. There are profound differences between the east coast lagoon and the west coast lagoon, and Ngaraard's strategic position would have been ideal to take full advantage of these resources. Near the traditional villages are taro swamp gardens, and surrounding most village sites are garden plots and terraced hillsides.

It is said that the Ngebuked people were originally from Angaur, living on a mountain called Roisbuked. When Roisbuked became overpopulated and there was limited land for crops or food, the people from Angaur began looking for another island to live on. After leaving Roisbuked, they moved to Peleliu, called Ngerchol. When Ngerchol could not hold anymore people, they moved to Babeldaob, landing in a place between Melekeok and Ngaraard. After landing, they walked toward Ngiwal, but Ngiwal's inhabitants were unwelcoming so they moved to Ngaraard in Ngeteluang.

Ngebuked was divided into two sections, bita el ked ma bita el ked. The chief of one section was Kerai and in the other section was an old woman named Romei. When Romei could not hold all the responsibilities as chief, she asked Oiseuang, another older woman to rule. Two brothers from Ngeruangel sailed by and saw smoke rising at Ngebuked, so they stopped to get supplies. The older brother liked what he saw at Ngebuked and decided to stay; the younger brother traveled to other areas of Babeldaob. The younger brother ended up in Melekeok and became Chief of Melekeok and the older brother stayed in Ngebuked.

Oiseuang aged and could not perform her chiefly duties, so she looked for a person able to perform the work as the chief. She visited a man she felt was competent and asked if he would become a chief, and he asked he could be named Mad. Chief Mad united the two sections into one village of Ngebuked and so he became Mad ra Ngebuked. Kerai remained village head, meaning that when there was a contribution of food, he still received the portion for the first title, but the one who has the authority and power over Ngebukedd is Maderangebuked. Therefore, the order of chiefly title is that the first title is Maderangebuked, the second title is Kerai and the third is Techur. Techur had clan members from Ngeaur, Airai and Ngerchelong. Therefore, if a member from Angaur assumed the title then he would be called Techureaur, if a clan member from Ngerchelong assumed the title he would be called Techurchelong, and if he was from Airai he would be called Techurrulak.

== Economy ==
Ngaraard has many natural resources, mainly forests and water. The landscape is mostly mountainous forest, sandy beaches on Desbedall and mangroves on the Keiukel side. There are many living things in Ngaraard's land, including fruit bats, pigeons, starlings, pigs, mangrove crabs, land crabs, cone shells (rechiil), shrimp in the creek, banded snakes (mengernger), aquatic snakes (kemaiirs), dogs, and cats. There are also many varieties of insects, including mosquitoes, wasps, bees, kerdard and many more.

One of the famous crops of Ngaraard is taro and its recipe, which uses taro leaves, coconut milk and land crab, is called demok. These are some other crops of Ngaraard: swamp cabbage (kangkum), tapioca (diokang), sweet potato (chemutii), giant swamp taro (brak), banana, calamondin (kingkang), breadfruits, ysaol, amra tree (titimel), Eugenia plant (chedebsachel), wax apple (rebotel), betelnut tree and pepper leaf (kebui). Ngaraard has a rich soil and plenty of crops but only a few vegetables.

== Education ==
The Ministry of Education operates public schools.

Ngaraard Elementary School was established after World War II, circa 1947, using a school building opened during the Japanese South Seas Mandate rule. In addition to Ngaraard, it served Kayangel, Ngarchelong, and Ngiwal.

Palau High School in Koror is the country's only public high school, so children from this community go there.
