= Ngerkeai =

Village in Palau

Ngerkeai is a village in Babeldaob island, the largest island in the island nation of the Republic of Palau. The village is the administrative center of Ngiwal state of Palau.
