= Imeong =

Village in Palau

Coordinates: 7°32′N 134°32′E

Imeong is a village in Palau, and the capital of the state of Ngaremlengui. The population is 132 (2009).
