= Ngesang =

- Subdivision
- Location within Palau
- Coordinates: 7°37′44″N 134°38′41″E
- Country: Palau
- State: Ngaraard
- Village: Elab

Ngesang is a small portion of the village of Elab, Palau, and the area where most of Elab's inhabitants live. It is also the location of Ngaraard's Bethania High School for girls. Ngesang is located on the eastern shore of Ngaraard State. It has shady beaches canopied with large trees. On the northern end of Ngesang is the beginning of the ancient stone pathways that connects the east and the west coasts. Ngesang Chief is Uong and the meeting bai for men and women club is BairaTuich.

Ngesang is also the location of the Catholic Church of Ngaraard and the famous Kuabes Park.
