= Maderangebuked =

Maderangebuked is Ngaraard State's highest ranking chief title. This chief title is passed down to men, through their mother's family lineage. The Chief Maderangebuked is considered the head of the council of chiefs in Ngaraard. The chief titles of Ngaraard are arranged, in order of rank, from top to bottom:

1. Maderangebuked
2. Beches
3. Kloulubak
4. Ngirarois
5. Ngirameketii

Today's present Maderangebuked is President Tommy Remengesau Jr.
