= Urdmang =

- Village
- Location within Palau
- Coordinates: 7°37′N 134°35′E
- Country: Palau
- Island: Babeldaob

Urdmang is a village in the northwest of Babeldaob, the main island of Micronesian republic of Palau. It is the capital of the Ngardmau state.

Urdmang is more or less merged with Ngerutoi and Ngetbong, the only two other hamlets in the state. The villages are often commonly referred to as Ngardmau.
