= Ngkeklau =

Village in Palau

- Village
- Interactive map of Ngkeklau

Area
  - Total: 0.3 km^{2} (0.12 sq mi)
- Elevation: 3 m (9.8 ft)

Ngkeklau is a populated area in the southern region of the state of Ngaraard in the Republic of Palau. The town has a small population, on the east coastal plains of Ngaraard. The town includes several ancient relics of stone, such as stone paths, platforms, and burial sites.

== Geography ==
Ngkeklau is located at approximately 7.5911111°N 134.6366667°E. The town is located at the eastern coastal area of Ngaraard State. Its shores are mostly mangrove forests, but in some places, there are soft sandy beaches. The town's western region has many of the ancient relics of their past times, and steep rolling hills with sparsely green tropical forests in between.
