= States of Palau =

State
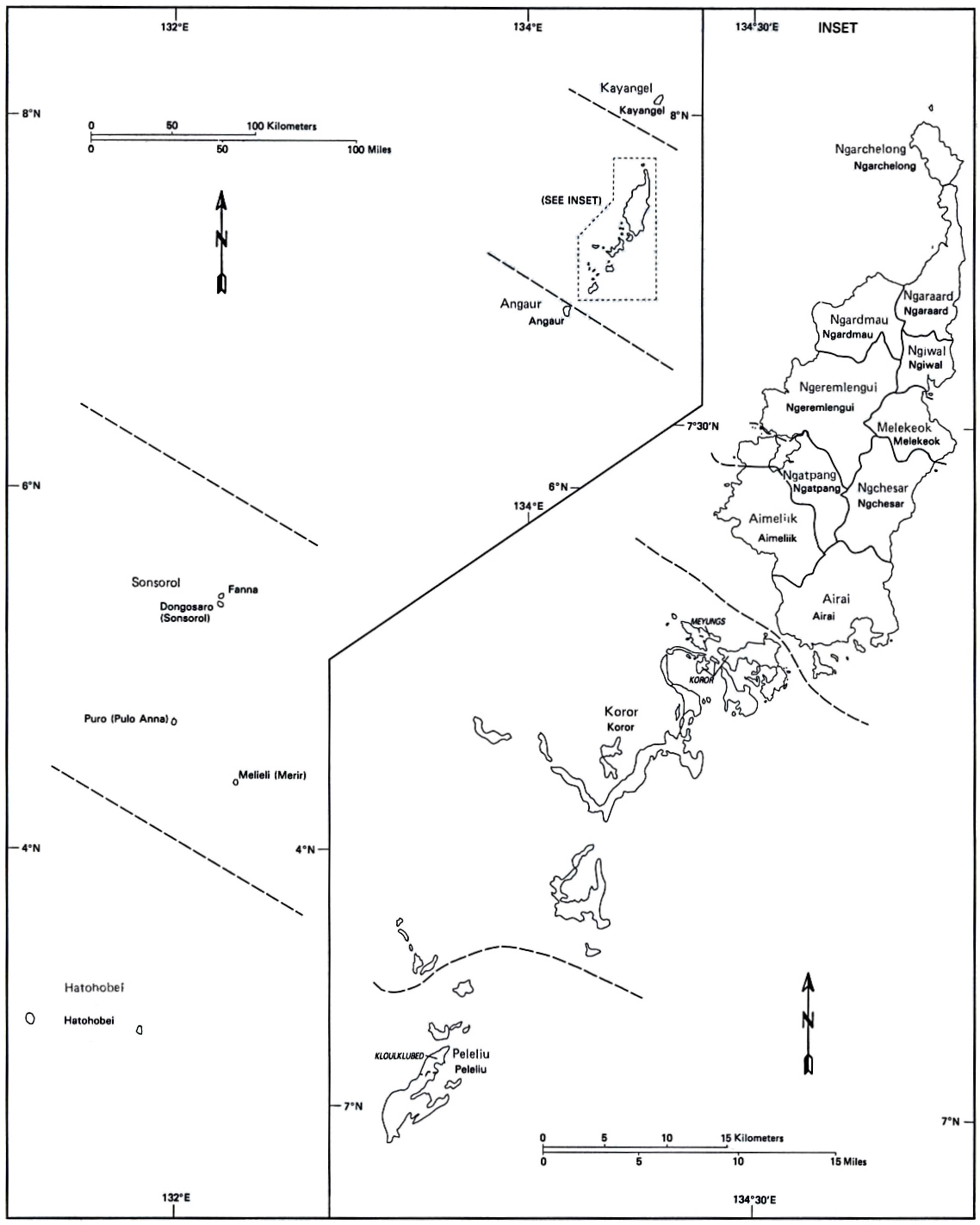
- Category: Unitary state
- Location: Palau
- Number: 16
- Populations: 25 (Hatohobei) – 11,444 (Koror)
- Areas: .9 km^{2} (0.35 sq mi) (Hatohobei) – 65 km^{2} (25 sq mi) (Ngeremlengui)
- Government: State Government, Government of Palau
- Subdivisions: Municipalities

Palau is divided into sixteen administrative regions, called states. Palau has a high ratio of government offices to citizens, with 16 states and both a tribal chiefdom and elected legislature in each state, for 20,000 people.

The majority of the country's population lives in Koror State. Airai is the only other state with a population exceeding 1,000, and three states have populations of fewer than 100.

== List of states ==
State	Capital	Area (km^{2})	Population (Census 2015)
North of Babeldaob
Kayangel	Orukei	3	54
Babeldaob
Aimeliik	Mongami	52	334
Airai	Ngerusar	44	2455
Melekeok	Melekeok	28	277
Ngaraard	Ulimang	36	413
Ngarchelong	Mengellang	10	316
Ngardmau	Urdmang	47	185
Ngeremlengui	Imeong	65	350
Ngatpang	Ngereklmadel	47	282
Ngchesar	Ngersuul	41	291
Ngiwal	Ngerkeai	26	282
Southwest of Babeldaob
Angaur	Ngaramasch	8	119
Koror	Ngerbeched	65	11444
Peleliu	Kloulklubed	13	484
Southwest Islands
Hatohobei	Hatohobei	3	25
Sonsorol	Dongosaru	3	40

== See also ==
- ISO 3166-2:PW
