= Babeldaob =

Largest island of Palau

Coordinates: 7°31′49″N 134°33′53″E

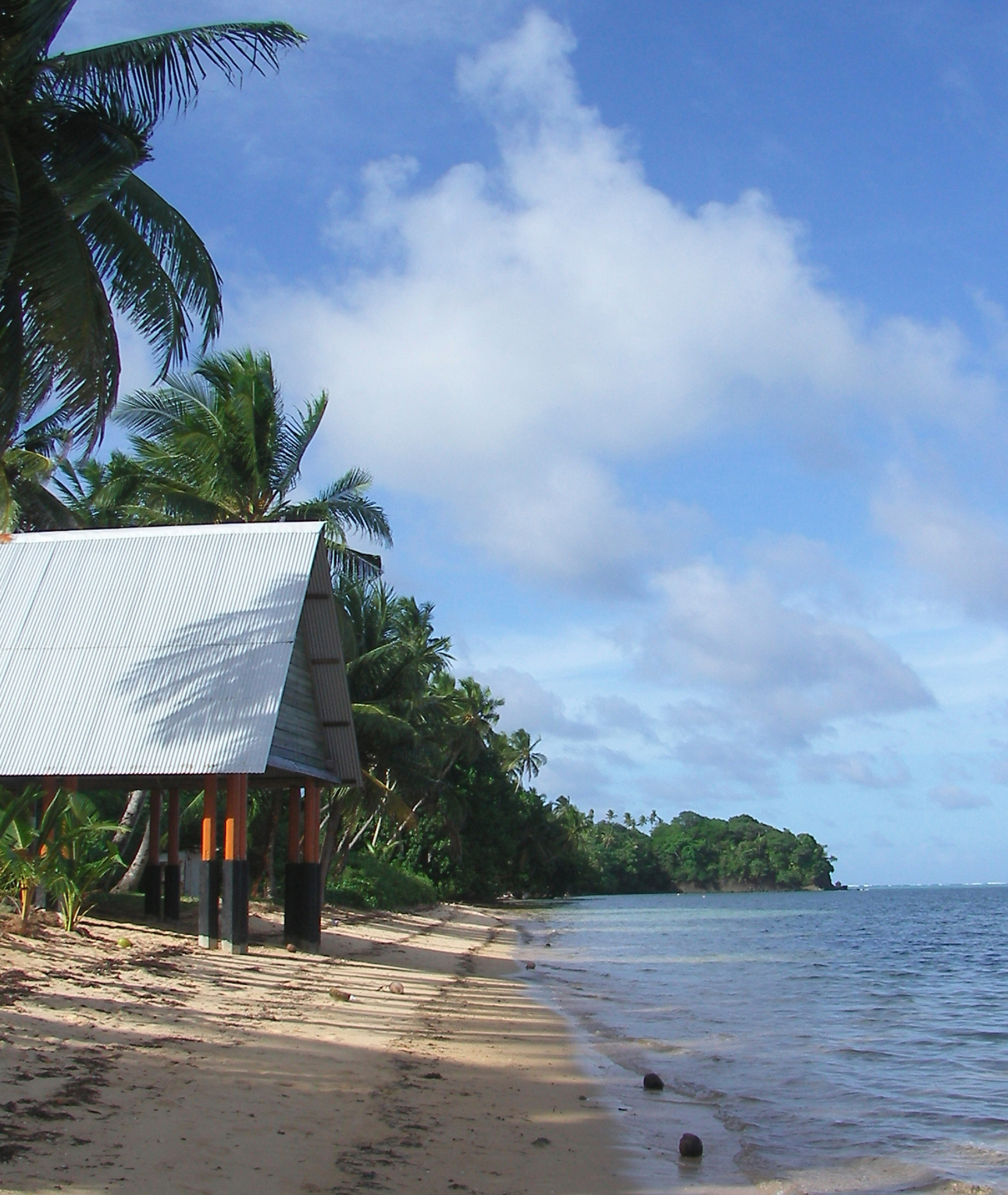
- Beach near Melekeok

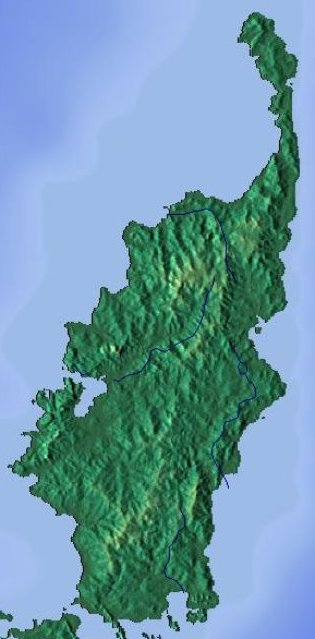
- Map of Babeldaob Island

Geography
- Location: Pacific Ocean
- Archipelago: Caroline Islands
- Area: 331 km^{2} (128 sq mi)
- Highest elevation: 242 m (794 ft)
- Highest point: Mount Ngerchelchuus

Administration
- Palau

Babeldaob (also Babelthuap) is the largest island in the island nation of Palau. It is in the western Caroline Islands, and the second largest island (after Guam) in the Micronesia region of Oceania. Palau's capital, Ngerulmud, is located on Babeldaob, in Melekeok State.

Babeldaob is one of the most underdeveloped populated islands in the Pacific Ocean. The area of Babeldaob, 331 km^{2} (128 sq mi), makes up over 70% of the land area of the entire Republic of Palau. It has about 30% of the country's population, with about 6,000 people living on it.

== Geography ==
Babeldaob is located northeast of Koror Island, and its northern portion contains the site of the new national capital, Ngerulmud. The southern end of the island is in Airai, Palau's second-most populous state. The Airai Airport on the island is the nation's principal airport.

The Koror-Babeldaob Bridge links Babeldaob Island at Airai to Koror Island.

Unlike most of the islands of Palau, Babeldaob is mountainous. It contains Palau's highest point, the 242 m (794 ft)-tall Mount Ngerchelchuus. Babeldaob's eastern coast has many sandy beaches, in particular north from Melekeok to Ngaraard, and the island's western coast has a shoreline with many mangrove forests.

Of the 16 states of Palau, Babeldaob encompasses 10, which are:

- Aimeliik
- Airai
- Melekeok
- Ngaraard
- Ngarchelong
- Ngardmau
- Ngatpang
- Ngchesar
- Ngeremlengui
- Ngiwal

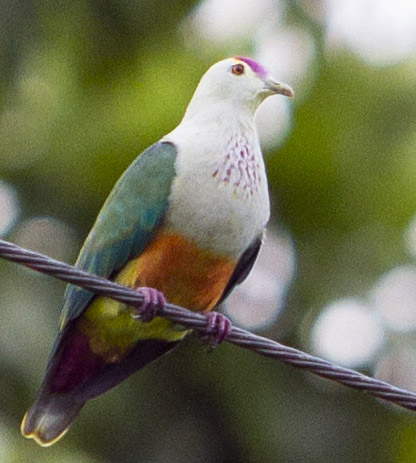
The Palau fruit dove is endemic to Palau and is the country’s national bird

== Environment ==
=== Important Bird Areas ===
The central forested Middle Ridge of Babeldaob encompasses the headwaters of most of the island’s watersheds. Some 13,767 ha in area, it has been designated an Important Bird Area (IBA) by BirdLife International because it supports populations of most of Palau’s endemic birds, including Micronesian megapodes, Palau ground doves, Micronesian imperial pigeons, Palau fruit doves, swiftlets, owls and kingfishers, Micronesian myzomelas, morningbirds, Palau fantails, flycatchers and bush warblers, dusky and citrine white-eyes, and Micronesian starlings. The Western Ridge IBA adjoins Middle Ridge in the north-west of the island. This 2,608 ha site contains populations of the same bird species, as does the 1,135 ha Ngerutechei IBA on the western side of the island, which also includes riverine mangrove habitat.

== History ==
First sighting of Babeldaob, Koror and Peleliu recorded by Europeans was by the Spanish expedition of Ruy López de Villalobos at the end of January 1543. They were then charted as Los Arrecifes ("The Reefs" in Spanish). In November and December 1710 these three islands were again visited and explored by the Spanish missionary expedition commanded by Sargento Mayor Francisco Padilla on board of the patache Santísima Trinidad. Two years later they were explored in detail by the expedition of Spanish naval officer Bernardo de Egoy. It was in the Spanish East Indies from 1686 to 1899.

As a consequence of the Spanish–American War, Spain sold Palau (including Babeldaob), the Carolines and the Northern Marianas (except Guam) to the German Empire for 17 million goldmark pursuant to the German–Spanish Treaty (1899). The newly acquired islands were administered from German New Guinea. Babeldaob was the destination to which the 426 members of the Sokehs tribe were banished by colonial authorities following the Sokehs Rebellion on Sokehs Island and Pohnpei.

In the early months of World War I, the Empire of Japan occupied all German islands north of the equator. As a League of Nations mandatory power after the war, Japan returned the Sokehs to Pohnpei in stages between 1917 and 1927.

During World War II a Japanese garrison on Babeldaob was composed of 21,449 Imperial Japanese Army men under the command of Lieutenant-General Sadae Inoue and 8,286 Imperial Japanese Navy men under the command of Vice-Admiral Kenmi Itoh. Allied forces bypassed Babeldaob during the war.

== See also ==
- Ngebedech Terraces – a proposed UNESCO World Heritage Site on this island.
