= Palauan language =

Austronesian language of Palau

Palauan
- a tekoi er a Belau
- Native to: Palau, Guam, Northern Mariana Islands
- Native speakers: 17,000 (2008)
- Language family: Austronesian: Malayo-Polynesian; Palauan
- Early forms: Proto-Austronesian: Proto-Malayo-Polynesian; Proto-Palauan; Old Palauan
- Standard forms: Standard Palauan
- Dialects: Palauan dialects
- Writing system: Latin (formerly katakana)

Official status
- Official language in: Palau
- Regulated by: Palau Language Commission

Language codes
- ISO 639-2: pau
- ISO 639-3: pau
- Glottolog: pala1344
- Linguasphere: 31-PAA-aa
- Location within Southeast Asia
- Coordinates: 7.34°N 134.48°E

Palauan (a tekoi er a Belau) is a Malayo-Polynesian language native to the Republic of Palau, where it is one of the two official languages, alongside English. It is widely used in day-to-day life in the country. Palauan is not closely related to other Malayo-Polynesian languages and its exact classification within the family is unclear.

== Classification ==
It is a member of the Malayo-Polynesian branch of the Austronesian family of languages, and is one of only two indigenous languages in Micronesia that are not part of the Oceanic sub-branch of that family, the other being Chamorro (see Dempwolff 1934, Blust 1977, Jackson 1986, and Zobel 2002).

Roger Blench (2015) argues that based on evidence from fish names, Palauan had early contact with Oceanic languages either directly or indirectly via the Yapese language. These include fish names for the sea eel, yellowfin tuna (Thunnus albacares), left-eye flounder (Bothus mancus), triggerfish, sailfish, barracuda (Sphyraena barracuda), damsel fish (Abudefduf sp.), squirrelfish (Holocentrus spp.), unicorn fish (Naso spp.), trevally, land crab (Cardisoma rotundus), and wrasse. This suggests that Oceanic speakers had influenced the fishing culture of Palau, and had been fishing and trading in the vicinity of Palau for quite some time. Blench (2015) also suggests that the Palauan language displays influence from Central Philippine languages and Samalic languages.

== Phonology ==
The phonemic inventory of Palauan consists of 10 consonants and 6 vowels. Phonetic charts of the vowel and consonant phonemes are provided below, utilizing the International Phonetic Alphabet (IPA).

=== Consonants ===
		Bilabial	Alveolar	Velar	Glottal
Nasal		m		ŋ	
Plosive	voiceless		t	k	ʔ
Plosive	voiced	b	d		
Fricative			s		
Approximant			l		
Tap			ɾ		

==== Allophones ====
While the phonemic inventory of Palauan is relatively small, comparatively, many phonemes contain at least two allophones that surface as the result of various phonological processes within the language. The full phonetic inventory of consonants is given below in IPA (the phonemic inventory of vowels is complete).

		Bilabial	Dental	Alveolar	Palatal	Velar	Glottal
Nasal		m		n		ŋ	
Plosive	tenuis	p		t		k	ʔ
Plosive	aspirated	pʰ		tʰ		kʰ	
Plosive	voiced	b		d		g	
Fricative	voiceless		θ	s			
Fricative	voiced		ð				
Approximant				l	j	w	
Vibrant	tap			ɾ			
Vibrant	trill			r			

The following is the table of allophones and their contexts in Palauan.

Phoneme	Allophone	Context
/b/	[p]	Word final, e.g. tub [tʰup] "spit"; Before another consonant, e.g. brer [prɛr]
/d/	[ð]	Word initially (in careful speech), e.g. dub [ðup] "dynamite"

=== Vowels ===
	Front	Central	Back
Close	i		u
Mid	ɛ	ə	o
Open		a	

==== Diphthongs ====
Palauan contains several diphthongs (sequences of vowels within a single syllable). A list of diphthongs and corresponding Palauan words containing them are given below, adapted from Zuraw (2003).

IPA	Example	English Translation
/iɛ/	babier	"paper" (German loan)
/iu/	chiukl	"(singing) voice"
/io/	kikiongel	"dirty"
/ia/	diall	"ship"
/ɛi/	mei	"come"
/ɛu/	teu	"width"
/ɛo/	Oreor	"Koror" (former capital of Palau)
/ɛa/	beached	"tin"
/ui/	tuich	"torch"
/uɛ/	sueleb	"afternoon"
/uo/	uos	"horse" (English loan)
/ua/	tuangel	"door"
/oi/	tekoi	"word"
/oɛ/	beroel	"spear"
/ou/	merous	"distribute"
/oa/	omoachel	"river"
/ai/	chais	"news"
/aɛ/	baeb	"pipe" (English loan)
/au/	mesaul	"tired"
/ao/	taod	"fork"

The extent to which it is accurate to characterize each of these vowel sequences as diphthongs has been a matter of debate, as in Wilson 1972, Flora 1974, Josephs 1975, and Zuraw 2003. Nevertheless, a number of the sequences above, such as /ui/, clearly behave as diphthongs given their interaction with other aspects of Palauan phonology like stress shift and vowel reduction. Others do not behave as clearly like monosyllabic diphthongs.

== Writing system ==
In the early 1970s, the Palau Orthography Committee worked with linguists from the University of Hawaiʻi to devise an alphabet based on the Latin script. The resulting orthography was largely based on the "one phoneme/one symbol" notion, producing an alphabet of twelve native consonants, six consonants for use in loan words, and ten vowels. The 20 vowel sequences listed under Diphthongs are also all officially recognized in the orthography.

Most of the letters/graphemes in written Palauan correspond to phonemes that can be represented by the corresponding segments in the International Phonetic Alphabet (Nuger 2016:308), e.g., Palauan ⟨b⟩ is the phoneme /b/. Three notable exceptions are worth mentioning:

- The first is ⟨ch⟩, which is invariably pronounced as a glottal stop [ʔ]. The ch digraph is a remnant of an earlier writing system developed during German occupation when the glottal stop was pronounced as a fricative [x]; some older Palauans still remember their grandparents pronouncing ch this way. In modern Palauan usage of the sound [x] has been completely replaced by [ʔ], but the ch spelling persists.
- The second is ⟨e⟩. It represents sometimes the full vowel [ɛ] as in sers [sɛrs] 'garden', and sometimes a schwa [ə], as in ngalek [ˈŋalək] 'child'. The distribution of the two pronunciations is similar to those of English vowel reduction: [ɛ] is found in stressed syllables vs. [ə] in unstressed ones (compare Eng. fell vs. fallen).
  - The two sounds [ɛ] and [ə] were once distinguished in the orthography, as the schwa [ə] was spelled ⟨ę⟩, using an ogonek: e.g. ngalęk [ˈŋalək] 'child'. This was the orthography used by Josephs in his 1975 grammar; yet the same author has used a simple ⟨e⟩ in his later work, e.g. his 1990 dictionary.
- The third is the digraph ⟨ng⟩, which is a (phonemic) velar nasal /ŋ/ but can assimilate to be pronounced as [m] or [n].

There is no phonemic /n/ in Palauan: this gap is due to a historical sound shift from Proto-Malayo-Polynesian *n to /l/ ‒ a change that is also found elsewhere in the region (e.g. in Gorontalo).

On May 10, 2007, the Senate of Palau passed Bill No. 7-79, which mandates that educational institutions recognize the Palauan orthography laid out in Josephs 1997 and Josephs 1999. The bill also establishes an Orthography Commission to maintain the language as it develops as well as to oversee and regulate any additions or modifications to the current official orthography.

Native consonants
Palauan grapheme	IPA	Example word
b	[b], [p], [bʱ], [pʰ]	bai 'community house'
ch	[ʔ]	charm 'animal'
d	[d], [t], [ð], [θ]	diall 'ship'
k	[k], [ɡ], [kʰ], [ɡʱ]	ker 'question'
l	[l]	lius 'coconut'
ll	[lː]	llel 'leaf'
m	[m]	martiliong 'hammer' (Span. Martillo)
ng	[ŋ], [n]	ngau 'fire'
r	[ɾ]	rekas 'mosquito'
rr	[r]	rrom 'liquor'
s	[s]	sechelei 'friend'
t	[t], [tʰ]	tuu 'banana'

Foreign consonants
Palauan grapheme	IPA	Example word
f	[f]	fenda 'fender' (Eng.)
h	[h]	haibio 'tuberculosis' (Jpn. haibyoo 肺病)
n	[n]	sensei 'teacher' (Jpn. sensei 先生)"
p	[p]	Papa 'the Pope' (Span. Papa)
ts	[ts]	tsuingam 'chewing gum' (Eng.)
z	[z]	miuzium 'museum' (Eng.)

Vowels
Palauan grapheme	IPA	Example word
a	[a]	chad 'person'
e	[ɛ]	sers 'garden'
e	[ə]	ngalek 'child'
ee	[ɛː]	kmeed 'near'
i	[i]	sils 'sun'
ii	[iː], [ji], [ij]	iis 'nose'
o	[o]	ngor 'mouth'
oo	[oː]	sekool 'playful'
u	[u]	bung 'flower'
uu	[uː], [wu], [uw]	ngduul 'mangrove clam'

== Grammar ==
=== Pronouns ===
The following set of pronouns are the pronouns found in the Palauan language:

	Free	NOM I	NOM II	OBJ	POSS
1st person singular	ngak	ak	k-	-ak	-k
2nd person singular	kau	kə	chom-	-au	-m
3rd person singular	ngii	ng	l-	-ii	-l
1st person plural inclusive	kid	kədə	d-	-id	-d
1st person plural exclusive	kəmam	aki	-kim	-əmam	-(m)am
2nd person plural	kəmiu	kom	chom-	-əmiu	-(m)iu
3rd person plural	tir	tə	-l	-tərir	-rir

=== Noun inflection ===
Palauan nouns inflect based on humanness and number via the plural prefix re-, which attaches to plural human nouns (see Josephs 1975:43). For example, the word chad 'person' is a human noun that is unambiguously singular, whereas the noun rechad people is a human noun that is unambiguously plural. Non-human nouns do not display this distinction, e.g., the word for 'stone', bad, can denote either a singular 'stone' or multiple 'stones.'

Some possessed nouns in Palauan also inflect to agree with the person, number, and humanness of their possessors. For example, the unpossessed noun tebel means simply 'table,' whereas one of its possessed forms tebelek means 'my table.' Possessor agreement is always registered via the addition of a suffix to the noun (also triggering a shift in stress to the suffix). The possessor agreement suffixes have many different irregular forms that only attach to particular nouns, and they must be memorized on a noun-by-noun basis (Josephs 1997:96). However, there is a "default" e-set suffixes (see Josephs 1997:93 and Nuger 2016:28), shown below:

E-set
		Singular	Plural	
		Singular	Inclusive	Exclusive
1st person		-ek	-ed	-am
2nd person		-em	-iu	
3rd person	human	-el	-ir	
3rd person	nonhuman	-el		

U-set, I-set, and A-set
		Singular	Plural	
		Singular	Inclusive	Exclusive
1st person		-Vk	-Vd	-(e)mam
2nd person		-Vm	-(e)miu	
3rd person	human	-Vl	-(e)rir	
3rd person	nonhuman	-Vl		
Note that -V- represents vowels -u-, -i-, or -a-.

There are some morphophonological changes, often unpredictable, including: (Josephs 1997)

- Single vowels are reduced to /ə/, written as e (bad → bed·uk 'my stone'), or being syncopated entirely (ngikel → ngkel·el 'my fish'), with few nouns not reducing their vowel (chim → chim·ak 'my hand')
- Double vowels are reduced to single vowels (deel → del·ek 'my nail'), sometimes reduced further to /ə/ (diil → del·ek) or even syncopated
- Due to syncopation, numerous complicated consonant clusters are produced, and some of them are simplified in Palauan (relm → lm·ek 'my water', tut → t·uk 'my breast')

=== Verb inflection ===
Palauan verb morphology is highly complex. menga(ng) 'eat', for example, may be analyzed as verb prefix me- + imperfective -ng- + kal, in which -kal is an archimorpheme that is only apparent from comparing various forms, e.g. kall 'food' and taking into consideration morphophonemic patterns: Ng milenga a ngikel a bilis 'the dog was eating fish' (lit. it VERB PREFIX-m eat-PAST INFIX-il- ARTICLE fish ARTICLE dog); Ng kma a ngikel a bilis 'The dog eats up fish' (lit. it-eat-PERFECTIVE-INFIX-m- fish ARTICLE dog). The verb system points to fossilized forms related to the Philippine languages.

=== Word order ===
The word order of Palauan is usually thought to be verb–object–subject (VOS), but this has been a matter of some debate in the linguistic literature. Those who accept the VOS analysis of Palauan word order generally treat Palauan as a pro-drop language with preverbal subject agreement morphemes, final pronominal subjects are deleted (or null).

Example 1: Ak milenga er a ringo pro. (means: 'I was eating the apple.')

In the preceding example, the abstract null pronoun pro is the subject 'I,' while the clause-initial ak is the first person singular subject agreement morpheme.

On the other hand, those who have analyzed Palauan as SVO necessarily reject the pro-drop analysis, instead analyzing the subject agreement morphemes as subject pronouns. In the preceding example, SVO-advocates assume that there is no pro and that the morpheme ak is simply an overt subject pronoun meaning 'I'. One potential problem with this analysis is that it fails to explain why overt (3rd person) subjects occur clause-finally in the presence of a co-referring 3rd person "subject pronoun" --- treating the subject pronouns as agreement morphemes circumvents this weakness. Consider the following example.

Example 2: Ng milenga er a ringngo a Satsuko. (means: 'Satsuko was eating the apple.')

Proponents of the SVO analysis must assume a shifting of the subject a Satsuko 'Satsuko' from clause-initial to clause-final position, a movement operation that has not received acceptance cross-linguistically, but see Josephs 1975 for discussion.

== Palauan phrases ==
Some common and useful words and phrases in Palauan are listed below, with their English translations.

Palauan	English
Alii!	Hello!
Ungil tutau.	Good morning.
Ungil sueleb.	Good afternoon.
Ungil kebesengei.	Good evening.
A ngklek a ___.	My name is ___.
Ng techa ngklem?	What's your name?
Ke ua ngerang?	How are you?
Ak mesisiich.	I'm fine.
Ak chad er a ___.	I'm from ___.
Belau	Palau
Merikel	U.S.
Ingklis	England
Siabal	Japan
Sina	China
Ke chad er ker el beluu?	Where are you from?
Ke mlechell er ker el beluu?	Where were you born?

Palauan	English
Ak mlechell er a ___.	I was born in ___.
Ng tela a rekim?	How old are you?
Ng ___ a rekik.	I am ___ years old.
Ng tela a dengua er kau?	What's your phone number?
A dengua er ngak a ___.	My phone number is ___.
Ke kiei er ker?	Where do you live?
Ak kiei er a ___.	I live ___.
Chochoi.	Yes.
Ng diak.	No.
Adang.	Please.
Sulang.	Thank you.
Ke mo er ker?	Where are you going?
Mechikung.	Goodbye.
Meral ma sulang!	Thank you very much!
A klebokel el bung	pretty flower.

== Palauan numerals ==
1 to 10:

1. tang
2. erung
3. edei
4. euang
5. eim
6. elolem
7. euid
8. eai
9. etiu
10. tacher

Palauans have different numbers for different objects. For example, to count people, it is: tang, terung, tedei, teuang, teim, telolem, teuid, teai, tetiu, and teruich. Traditionally, there were separate counting sets for people, things, counting, ordinals, bunches of bananas, units of time, long objects, and rafts; however, several of these are no longer used.

== Sample text ==
Article 1 of the Universal Declaration of Human Rights in Palauan:

A rogui 'l chad el mechell a ngarngii a ilmokl er tir ra diosisiu el llemalt. Ngarngii er tir a uldesuir mete mo meruul el mo rar bebil lokiu a ungil 'l omeruul ra klauchad.

Article 1 of the Universal Declaration of Human Rights in English:

All human beings are born free and equal in dignity and rights. They are endowed with reason and conscience and should act towards one another in a spirit of brotherhood.
