= Palau High School =

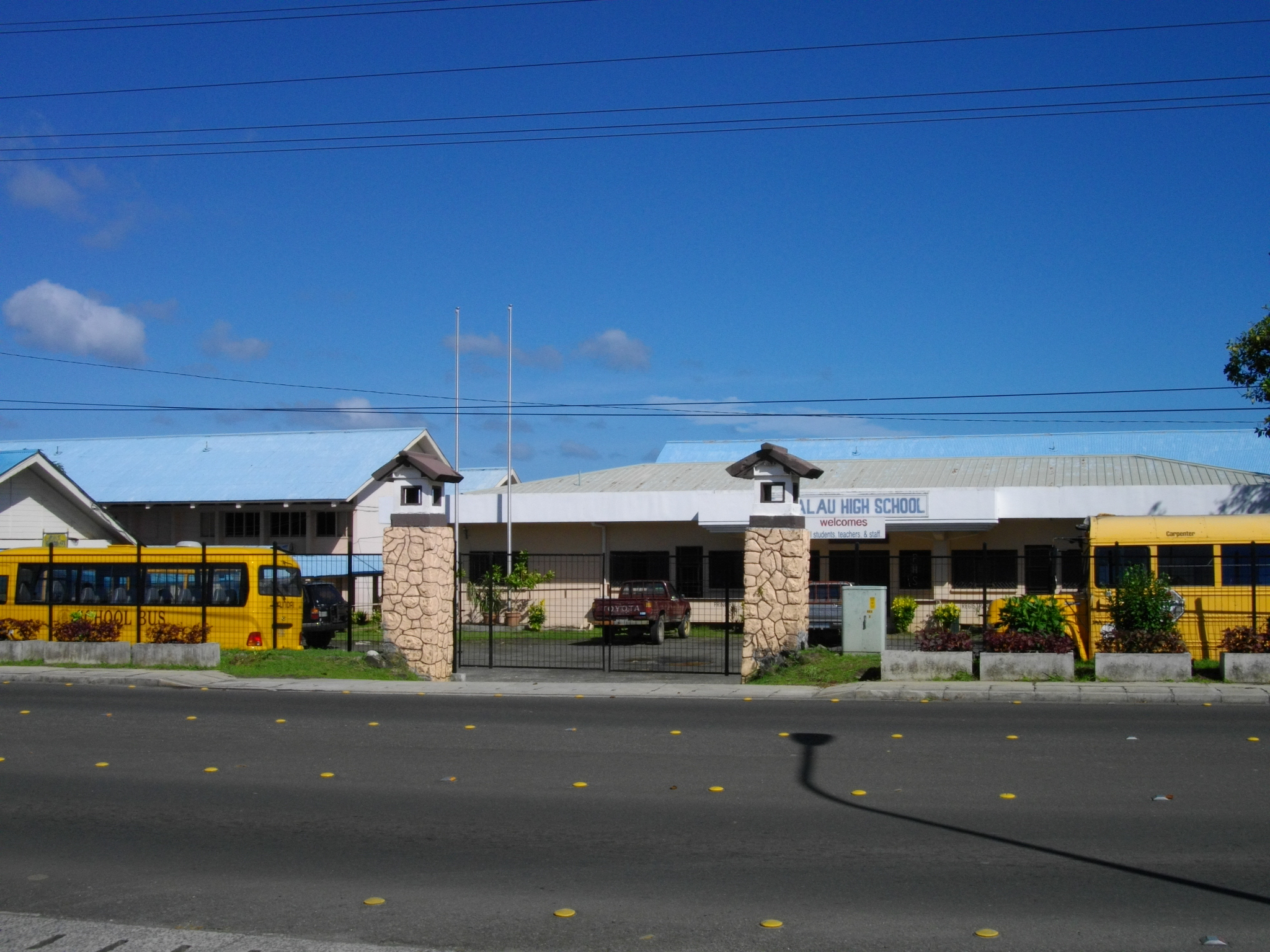

Location
- Koror City; Palau
- Coordinates: 7.3419132°N 134.47086319999994°E

Information
- Type: High school
- School district: Ministry of Education (Palau)
- Website: www.palaumoe.net/phs/

Palau High School (PHS) is a senior high school in Koror City, Palau. Opened in 1962, it is the country's only public high school, and the first high school established in Palau. The Western Association of Schools and Colleges (WASC) accredits the school.

The United States captured the Palau islands from Japan in 1944, and the Department of the United States Navy setup the school system in 1946, it operated elementary schools on a number of islands for grades 1–6, and opened Palau Intermediate School, in a building left by the Japanese, for the grades 7–9, offering a curriculum of vocational education programs. Palau had passed formally to the United States under United Nations auspices in 1947 as part of the Trust Territory of the Pacific Islands, and the U.S. Trustees extended the education system to add grades 10–12 in 1962; the elementary schools took on grades 1–9 and the Intermediate School building was converted into Palau High School, offering a mix of academic and vocational curricula for the older students.

A new building was completed sometime between the late 1960s and the middle of the 1970s, a period when several other public structures were built by the U.S. Trustees across the Trust Territory of the Pacific Islands. When Palau entered the Compact of Free Association in 1982, it took on more responsibility for its own education system, taking full control when it achieved independence in 1994.
