= Tobian language =

Micronesian language spoken in Palau

Tobian
- Ramarih Hatohobei
- Native to: Palau
- Region: Hatohobei, Koror, Sonsorol
- Native speakers: 150 (2017)
- Language family: Austronesian: Malayo-Polynesian; Oceanic; Micronesian; Micronesian Proper; Nuclear Micronesian; Chuukic–Pohnpeic; Chuukic; Tobian
- Writing system: Latin script

Official status
- Official language in: Hatohobei

Language codes
- ISO 639-3: tox
- Glottolog: tobi1238
- ELP: Tobian
- Coordinates: 3.00°N 131.17°E

Pidgin Tobi
- Native speakers: None
- Language family: Tobi-based pidgin

Language codes
- ISO 639-3: None (mis)
- Glottolog: hora1238
- ELP: Tobian

Tobian (ramarih Hatohobei, literally "the language of Tobi") is the language of Tobi, one of the Southwest Islands of Palau, and the main island of Hatohobei state. Tobian is a Micronesian language spoken by approximately 150 people, about 22 are native speakers. The speakers are located in either the island of Tobi or in Echang, a hamlet of Koror, the former capital of Palau. Tobian and Sonsorolese are very close, and appear to be gradually merging towards a new dialect called "Echangese". Earlier in the 20th century, about 1000 people lived on the island. Shortly before and during the First World War, those numbers dropped severely due to an abundance of disease.

== Classification ==
Tobian and the dialects of Sonsorol, Merir, and Pulo Ana, the other inhabited Southwest Islands, are closely related to the languages spoken in the Federated States of Micronesia outer islands of Yap and Chuuk Lagoon. These include Ulithi and the Central Carolines. Altogether, these languages form a sub-group within the Micronesian languages. The names of these dialects are the terms that are commonly used in European terms. Below are the native names as compared to the common names:

Common name	Native name
Sonsorol	Doŋo′sa:ru
Pul, Pulo Ana	Pu:r
Merir	Me′lel
Tobi	Torovei

Tobi is the basis of a local pidgin.

== Examples ==
- animal = mar
- coconut palm = ruh
- goodbye = sabuho
- language = ramarih
- soldierfish = red

=== Counting ===
- one = sewo
- two = huwou
- three = soruo
- four = fauwo

This is only base counting. There are different numerals for a lot of different objects.

== Phonology ==
=== Vowels ===
Vowels
		Front	Central	Back
High	close	i	ɨ ʉ	u
High	open	i̯		u̯
Mid	close	e	ø	o
Mid	open	e̯	œ	o̯
Low	close	ã		
Low	open	a		

"œ" is used rarely and sounds similar to the French "eu" but the lips do not round out at the end of the sound and has critical meaning in words. There is a central low vowel that sounds like the "u" in "but", but it does not have semantic value and it has very rare occurrence.

=== Diphthongs ===
There are a lot of diphthongs in Tobian and according to Capell, "several of them are difficult for Europeans".

diphthong	example	
äe	mäe	breadfruit
äi	fäivi	woman
aḛ	wa′ŋaḛt	then
ai	maik	swordfish
a:i	ma:il	forehead decoration
ao̯	wao̯	top
au	jau	needle
a:u	sa:u	piece
ei	lei	agent of action
oʉ	woʉ	rather of house
øi	røi	coconut oil
øʉ	Pannøʉ	Palau

=== Homonyms and near homonyms ===
Like most other languages, Tobian has examples of homonyms but they are not as abundant. Meanings can vary solely on vowel length. Also small differences in sounds can produce major differences in meanings. For example, the difference between voiceless (f) and voiced (v) consonants are important but there are many exceptions where it does not affect the meaning.

ŋøŋa	1. to chew betelnut	2. a stick used in weaving
ʉl	1. a lobster	2. to pull, drag
taitai	1. to excel, precede	2. to shave

==== Some minimal pairs ====
mäk	tattooing	ma	kind of garnish
′pannʉ	coconut leaf	Pannøʉ	Palau
i′te	my name	i′tøʉ?	who?
teiføʉ	thirsty	taivøʉ	new
ŋøs	tired	ŋo̯s	glans penis

==== Stress and prosody ====
Tobian utilizes both stress and pitch accents or tones. Compared to the other dialects, it uses less musical tone. It is not a tonal language because the tone does not change the meaning of the word. Although it is not tonal, the speech has a wide variety of tone variations that appear to be emotional rather than linguistic and either show emphasis or other semantic components. Stress accents are used but not as much as English or Russian. In the past, the stress marks would normally be placed on the last syllable of the words. In the present, the stress marks can be placed either on the last syllable or the second to last syllable.

1. Stress on the penultimate (second to last)
2. Stress on the final syllable
3. Stress on the antepenultimate (third to last)
4. Sentence stress
5. Vowel harmony
6. Vowel length
7. Furtive vowels (Slightly heard or silent vowels)

=== Consonants ===
Consonants
	Bilabial	Labio-dental	Dental-alveolar	Palatal	Velar
Plosives	p, b		t, d	c	k, ɡ
Nasals	m		n		ŋ
Fricatives		f, v	s (z), ʂ (ʐ)	j	x, ɣ
Lateral			(l)	(ɫ)	
Rolled			r		
Continuants	w				(w)
