= Rugby union in Palau =

Rugby union in Palau is a minor but growing sport.

== History ==
Rugby was introduced in the mid 20th century, either by the Japanese, or the Americans. Palau was a Japanese colony between the two world wars, and Japanese is still an official language there.

Palau's main problem is one of population. Only around 20,000 people live there. Although most of these people live on the main island, the southern islands, such as Sonsorol, are particularly isolated, making development difficult there, and land is at a premium, making the development of pitches difficult.

In 1995, Guam Rugby Club undertook tours to Saipan (in the Marianas), Palau, Pohnpei (Micronesia), and continental Asia.

Rugby Sevens has been a sport in the South Pacific Games since the late 1990s.
