= Southwest Islands (Palau) =

Island group of southwestern Palau

Coordinates: 5°20′N 132°13′E

The Southwest Islands of Palau are several small outlying islands spread across the Pacific Ocean about 600 km from the main island chain of Palau. They make up the Palauan states of Sonsorol and Hatohobei. The nearshore islands to the southwest of the main island of Palau (Babeldaob), which belong to the states of Koror, Peleliu and Angaur and the unincorporated Rock Islands, are not considered part of the Southwest Islands.

== Geography ==
The Southwest Islands are located some 275 to 325 km southwest of Angaur. These small outer islands, which include Sonsorol, Pulu Ana, and Meriir, are both physically and culturally distinct from the rest of the Palau. The islands are miniature platforms of raised reef composed of coralline limestone. The islands have sandy soils covered with atoll-like forest and brush. The islands are low, and have depressed, swampy interiors. Large stands of coconut palms line the beaches forming the primary resource for the only industry on the islands: copra production. Today, the islands are largely uninhabited as most of the native population lives in Koror or on Ngerekebesang Island. Even so, the natives retain a strong sense of cultural pride in their heritage and a firm commitment to their islands. The state governments operate the vessel connecting with Koror every 3 months.

The Southwest Islands, grouped by their state, from north to south, are:

- Sonsorol
  - Fana (Fanna)
  - Sonsorol (Dongosaru)
  - Pulo Anna (Puro)
  - Merir (Melieli)
- Hatohobei
  - Tobi Island (Hatohobei)
  - Helen Reef (Hotsarihie)
  - Transit Reef (Pieraurou)

== Traditional villages ==
There is little information available on traditional village patterns in the Southwest Islands. Osborne noted several individual old dwelling places and one concentration of platforms and pathways. There is some information available on traditional fishing practices. The surrounding ocean provided the primary source of protein and was probably intensely exploited prehistorically. Given the limited amount of land, it is expected that almost all of it would have been intensively exploited by settlement or subsistence activities.

== Culture ==
The people of the Southwest Islands and Tochobei (Tobi) share a cultural heritage that shows close ties with peoples of the central Caroline Islands, more than 1000 km to the northeast and on the other side of Palau. The migration of these people to the Southwest Islands must be one of the truly remarkable events in the prehistory of the Pacific.
