= Fana Island =

Island of Palau

Coordinates: 05°20′59″N 132°13′00″E

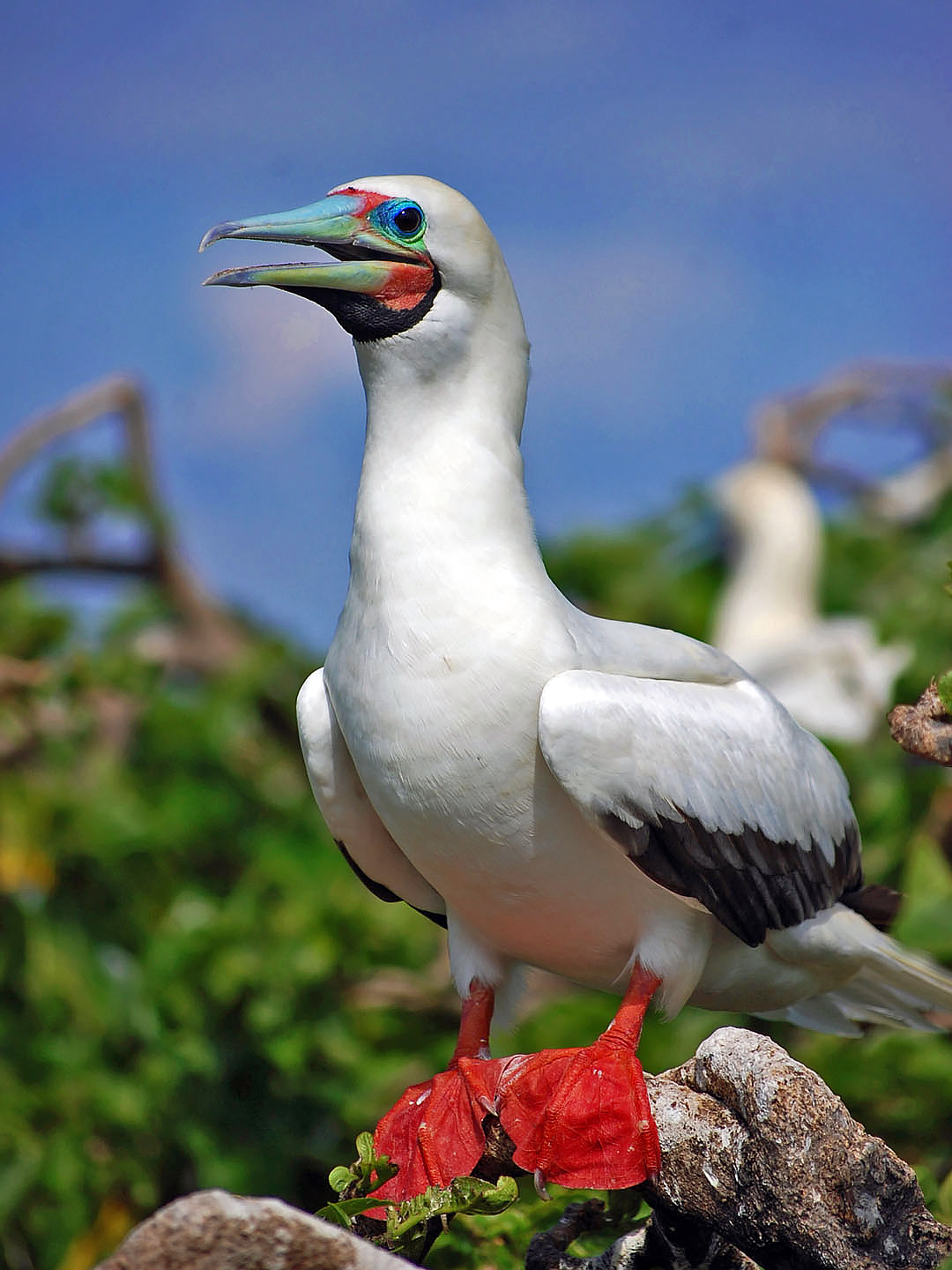
Red-footed boobies nest on the island

Fana Island, or Fanna Island, is a 40 ha, uplifted reef island in the state of Sonsorol in the Southwest Islands of Palau in Micronesia in the south-west Pacific Ocean. It is flat, low-lying and susceptible to storms. Although uninhabited, it is occasionally visited by people from nearby Sonsorol Island.

== Environment ==
Fana is densely vegetated with Pisonia forest. It is home to large numbers of seabirds and coconut crabs, and its beaches are used for nesting by green sea turtles.

=== Important Bird Area ===
The island has been designated an Important Bird Area (IBA) by BirdLife International because it supports breeding colonies of red-footed boobies, black noddies and common white terns. Brown noddies, greater frigatebirds and brown boobies also nest on the island.
