= Tobi (island) =

Island in the Republic of Palau

Coordinates: 03°00′22″N 131°07′26″E

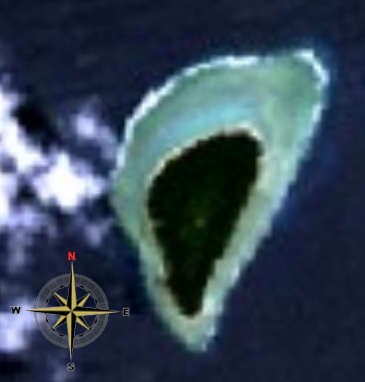
- Satellite image of Tobi

- Location of Tobi in Palau

Geography
- Location: Oceania, Pacific Ocean

Administration
- Palau
- State: Hatohobei

Tobi is an island in the Palauan state of Hatohobei. Tobi Island is 1.6 km long and 0.8 km wide, and has an area of about 0.85 square kilometres (0.33 sq mi). With a population of 39 according to a 2020 census, it holds all of the state's people, with the exception of a weather base on Helen Island. Most of the inhabitants live on the island's west side and speak Tobian.

Tobi, Helen Reef (Hotsarihie), Transit Reef (Pieraurou), and the islands in the state of Sonsorol make up the Republic of Palau's Southwest Islands.

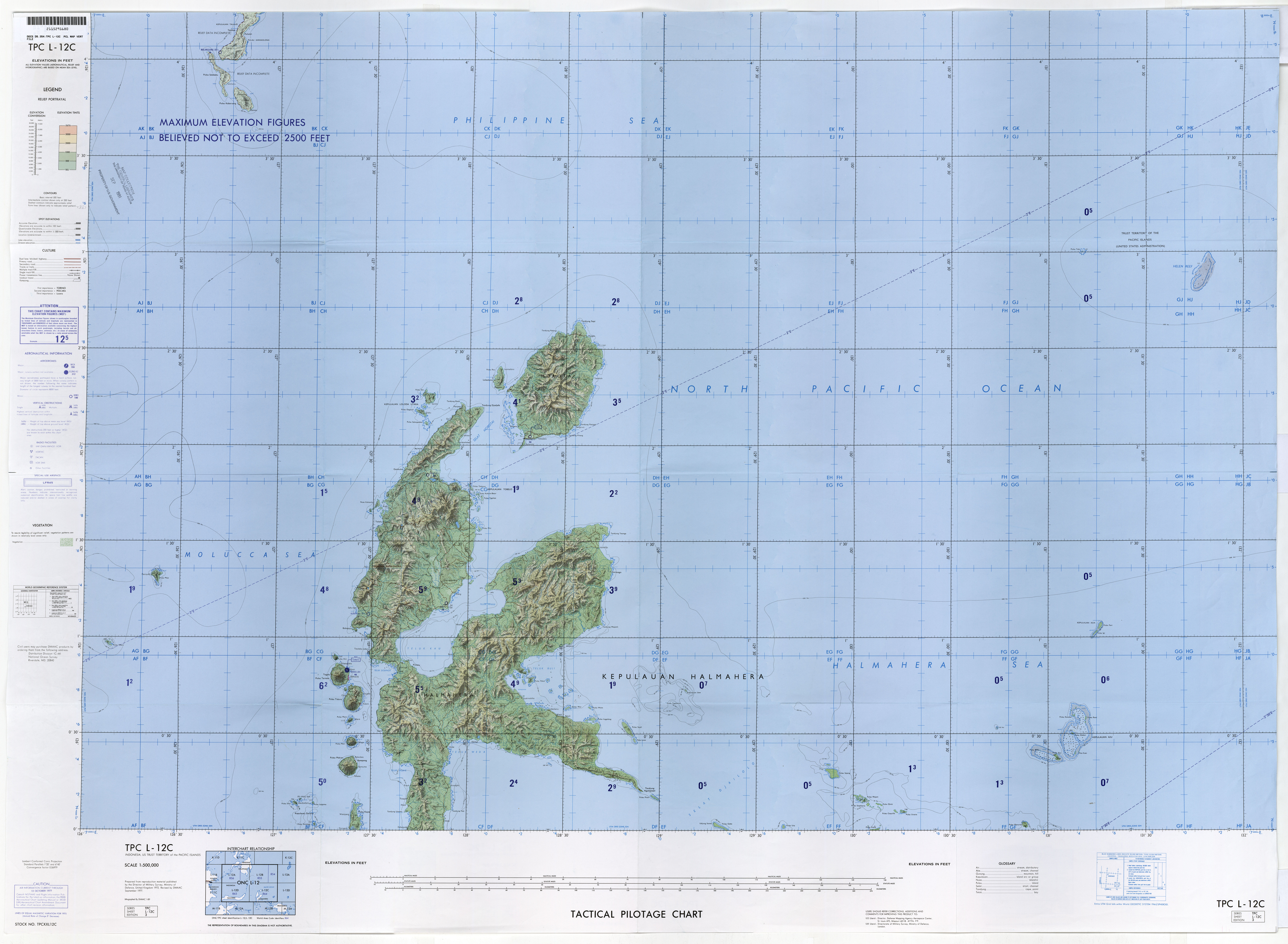
Map including Pulau Tobi and Helen Reef on the upper right (DMA, 1977)

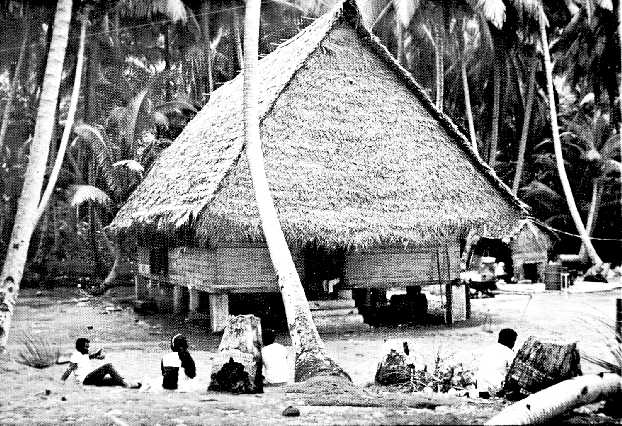
Tobi Island Bai

== Climate ==
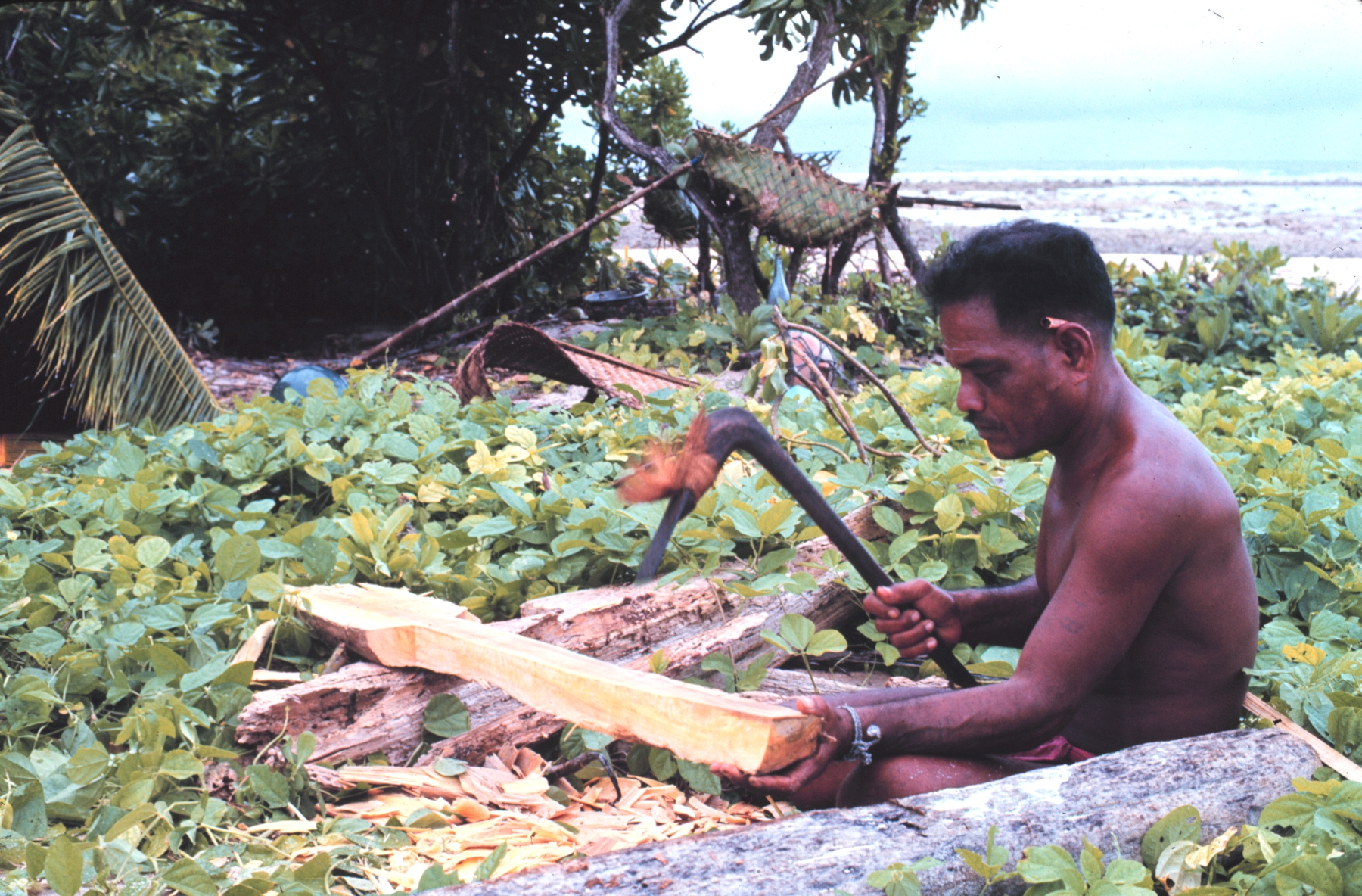
A villager at Tobi is making a paddle for a wa with an adze.

Tobi Island has a tropical rainforest climate (Af) with heavy to very heavy rainfall year-round. The Joint Typhoon Warning Center (JTWC) a United States Navy – United States Air Force command in Hawaii uses "KOBI" as a bearing and distance in determining a tropical storm's track and position.

Climate data for Tobi Island
Month	Jan	Feb	Mar	Apr	May	Jun	Jul	Aug	Sep	Oct	Nov	Dec	Year
Mean daily maximum °C (°F)	29.0 (84.2)	28.0 (82.4)	29.0 (84.2)	29.0 (84.2)	29.0 (84.2)	29.0 (84.2)	29.0 (84.2)	29.0 (84.2)	29.0 (84.2)	29.0 (84.2)	29.0 (84.2)	29.0 (84.2)	28.9 (84.1)
Mean daily minimum °C (°F)	25.0 (77.0)	25.0 (77.0)	25.0 (77.0)	26.0 (78.8)	26.0 (78.8)	26.0 (78.8)	26.0 (78.8)	26.0 (78.8)	26.0 (78.8)	26.0 (78.8)	26.0 (78.8)	26.0 (78.8)	25.8 (78.3)
Average precipitation mm (inches)	286 (11.3)	256 (10.1)	295 (11.6)	251 (9.9)	361 (14.2)	438 (17.2)	387 (15.2)	307 (12.1)	249 (9.8)	242 (9.5)	302 (11.9)	310 (12.2)	3,684 (145)
Source: Meteoblue.com
