= Sonsorolese =

Micronesian language spoken in Palau

- Ramari Dongosaro
- Native to: Palau
- Region: Palau: originally Sonsorol state (all three inhabited islands Sonsorol, Pulo Ana and Merir)
- Native speakers: 400 (2007)
- Language family: Austronesian: Malayo-Polynesian; Oceanic; Micronesian; Micronesian Proper; Nuclear Micronesian; Chuukic–Pohnpeic; Chuukic; Sonsorolese
- Writing system: Latin script

Official status
- Official language in: Sonsorol state

Language codes
- ISO 639-3: sov
- Glottolog: sons1242
- ELP: Sonsorol
- Sonsorolese is classified as Severely Endangered by the UNESCO Atlas of the World's Languages in Danger.

- Coordinates: 5.33°N 132.22°E

Sonsorolese is a Micronesian language spoken in Palau, originally on the islands composing the state of Sonsorol, and spreading through migration elsewhere in the country. It is very close to Tobian.

== Introduction ==
=== History ===
Sonsorolese is mostly spoken in the Palau archipelago, particularly in Sonsorol, Pulo Ana, and the Merir Islands. It is one of two indigenous languages spoken in the area.

=== Population ===
There are about 360 speakers spread out across 60 islands. Most speakers of Sonsorol are bilingual, with their second language being English. The language is an official language for the areas where it is spoken. It is usually used for the state's internal communications, like announcements and invitations. Some closely related languages of Sonsorol are Ulithian, Woleaian, and Satawalese. The language is part of the Austronesian language family. Most of the population have migrated from the islands of the Sonsorol state to Palau's main town, Koror and Echang village. The reasons are various, including economic and environmental. Young Sonsorolese speakers use a mixture of Palauan, English and Sonsorolese, what is called Echangese and is different from what the elder generation speaks. There are currently less than 20 speakers over 60 years old.

=== Geographic distribution ===
- Northern Mariana Islands: unknown (immigrant language)
- Palau: 600 speakers
  - Sonsorol: 60 speakers+
    - Merir: 5 speakers+
    - Pulo Anna: 25 speakers+
    - Sonsorol: 29 speakers+
  - Rest of the country: 540 speakers

=== Dialects ===
- Pulo-Anan
- Sonsorolese

== Phonology ==
=== Consonants ===
In Sonsorolese, there are 19 consonants. These consonants are: /p/, /b/, /t/, /d/, /c/, /k/, /ɡ/, /m/, /n/, /f/, /v/, /j/, /x/, /ɣ/, /r/, /w/, /s/, /ŋ/, and /ʟʲ/.

IPA chart Sonsorolese consonants
	Labial		Dental-Alveolar		Palatal		Velar	
Nasal		m		n				ŋ
Plosive	p	b	t	d	c		k	ɡ
Fricative	f	v	s			j	x	ɣ
Continuant		w		r				ʟʲ

=== Vowels ===
Sonsorolese has five vowels: /a/, /e/, /i/, /o/, and /u/. There are also diphthongs, including /ae/, /ai/, /ao/, and /au/. An example of the diphthong /ae/ is mae, which means "breadfruit".

=== Voiceless vowels ===
Voiceless vowels occur in three contexts: “as finals, after a consonant, after a full, generally long vowel, and before a consonant, when they are acoustically similar to falling diphthongs, after non-final consonants a furtive /i/ or /u/ produces palatalization or velarisation (respectively) of the consonants".

== Orthography and pronunciation ==
Sonsorolese is primarily a spoken language. Many of the sounds are like those in Tobian and Woleaian. A couple of dialects include the pronunciation of d, which is common at the beginning of words and similar to [ð]; r is pronounced as in Spanish; also, l is always pronounced with tongue touching the back roof of the mouth and sounds something like a combination of the [ɡ] and [l] sounds. For that reason, some Sonsorolese prefer to spell their els as ⟨ɡl⟩. As in Woleaian, voiceless vowels are usually found at the end of Sonsorolese words. For example, in Dongosaro, the native name for Sonsorol island, the final -o is voiceless.

Written documents in Sonsorolese include the Constitution of Sonsorol State and certain parts of the Bible. However, there seems to be a confusion regarding the Bible since there seems not to be a distinction between Tobian and Sonsorolese.

- a – [a]
- ae – [ae]
- ai – [ai]
- ao – [ao]
- au – [au]
- b – [b]
- c – [c]
- d – [d/ð]
- e – [e]
- f – [f]
- g – [g/ɣ]
- h – [x]
- i – [i]
- k – [k]
- l – [ʟʲ]
- m – [m]
- n – [n]
- ng – [ŋ]
- o – [o]
- p – [p]
- r – [r]
- s – [s]
- t – [t]
- u – [u]
- v – [v]
- w – [w]
- y – [j]

== Grammar ==
=== Reduplication ===
There is full reduplication in the Sonsorol language. E.g. 'orange' = hulu, 'oranges' = huluhulu.

=== Numerals ===
The numeral system of Sonsorolese is base-10. The numeral system can go up to 1,000, which is da ngaladi.

- deo "one"
- luwou "two"
- doruw "three"
- fauw "four"
- rimouwa "five"
- worouwa "six"
- fuduwa "seven"
- waruwa "eight"
- tiwouwa "nine"
- delh "ten"
- liyelh "twenty"

== Vocabulary ==
- meta?: "what?"
- ehamatahutohu: "dangerous"
- fou: "cold"
- itei hae ramari Dongosaro: "I don't speak Sonsorolese"
- halifato: "apple"
- fadolo: "banana"
- buu: "betel nut"
- farawo: "bread"
- hayang: "chicken"
- rutouya: "coconut"
- sahai: "egg"
- iha: "fish"
- als: "ice"
- woto: "taro"
- lahumu: "land crab"
- babai: "papaya"
- pelhi: "pork"
- raes: "rice"
- bito: "come"
