= Hatohobei =

Hatohobei Tobi
- State
- Flag
- Anthem: Pieri Wor
- Location of Hatohobei in Palau
- Country: Palau
- Capital: Hatohobei

Government
  - Body: Hatohobei State Legislature
  - Governor: Ray Marino

Area
  - Total: 0.9 km^{2} (0.35 sq mi)
  - Land: 0.9 km^{2} (0.35 sq mi)
  - Water: 0 km^{2} (0 sq mi)

Population (2015 Census)
  - Total: 25
  - Density: 8.3/km^{2} (21/sq mi)
  - Official languages: Palauan; English; Tobian
- ISO 3166 code: PW-050

Tobi, or Hatohobei (Tobian), is the southernmost of Palau's sixteen states, consisting of Tobi Island and Helen Reef. The total land area is about 0.88 km². The population was 25 in 2015. Tobian, English, and Sonsorolese are the official languages of Hatohobei State.

Not only is it Palau’s least populous state, but it is the least populous first-level administrative subdivision in the world as well as being the 13th smallest first level administrative subdivision.

== Demography ==
The population of the state was 25 in the 2015 census and median age was 21.5 years. Tobian is the official language of Hatohobei State.

In June 1972, the resident population was 79. The population was 80 in 1962, 51 in 1995, 23 in 2000, and 25 in 2015.

== Political system ==
Hatohobei has its own constitution, adopted in 1983. The state government was established in 1984. The state of Hatohobei, with a population of 25, has an elected chief executive, the governor. The state also has a legislature elected every four years. Its 2016 legislature consisted of nine members. The state population elects one of the members of the House of Delegates of Palau.

Governors of Hatohobei until 2012:

- Nemecio Andre, 1984–1988
- Crispin Emilio, 1988–2000
- Sabino Sackarias, 2000–2004
- Crispin Emilio, 2004–2008
- Thomas M. Patris, 2008–2012

== Geography ==
Tochobei (Tobi) is located some 450 km southwest of Angaur. These small outer islands are both physically and culturally distinct from the rest of Palau. The islands are miniature platforms of raised reef composed of coralline limestone. The islands have sandy soils covered with atoll-like vegetation. Tochobei Island is low with a depressed, swampy interior. At least a part of the depression is the result of phosphate mining during the Japanese administration. Large stands of coconut palms line the beaches forming the primary resource for the only industry on the islands: copra production. Today, the islands are largely uninhabited as most of the native population lives in Koror or on Ngerekebesang Island. Even so, the natives retain a strong sense of cultural pride in their heritage and a firm commitment to their islands.

=== Islands ===
The individual islands of Hatohobei, together with the islands of the state of Sonsorol, form the Southwest Islands of Palau.

No.	Island	Satellite picture	Area (km²)	Population (2015)	Coordinates
1	Tobi (Hatohobei)		0.85	30	03°00′22″N 131°07′26″E
2	Helen Reef (Hotsarihie)		0.03	3	02°57′N 131°47′E
3	Transit Reef (Pieraurou)	-	-	-	02°47′N 132°32′E
	State of Hatohobei	Hatohobei	0.88	33	

==== Tobi Island ====
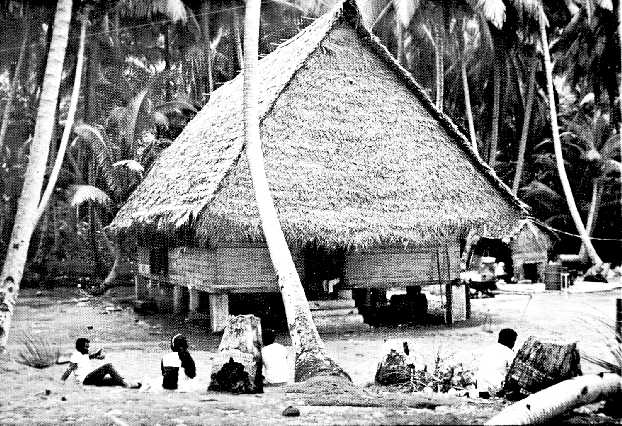
A bai on Tobi Island, 1971

Tobi (Hatohobei or Kodgubi) Island was once the main island of the state (together with the permanently manned Marine Ranger Station on the second island, Helen Island). The land area is 0.85 km². Its highest point is 6 m, while most of the island is less than 3 m high. Most of the houses are situated in the abandoned village of Tobi (Hatohobei) on the southwestern side of the island, the state capital. The island is covered with coconut palms. A cultivated area was situated near the center of the island. The island is fringed by a reef that extends up to 800 m from the shore in the north.

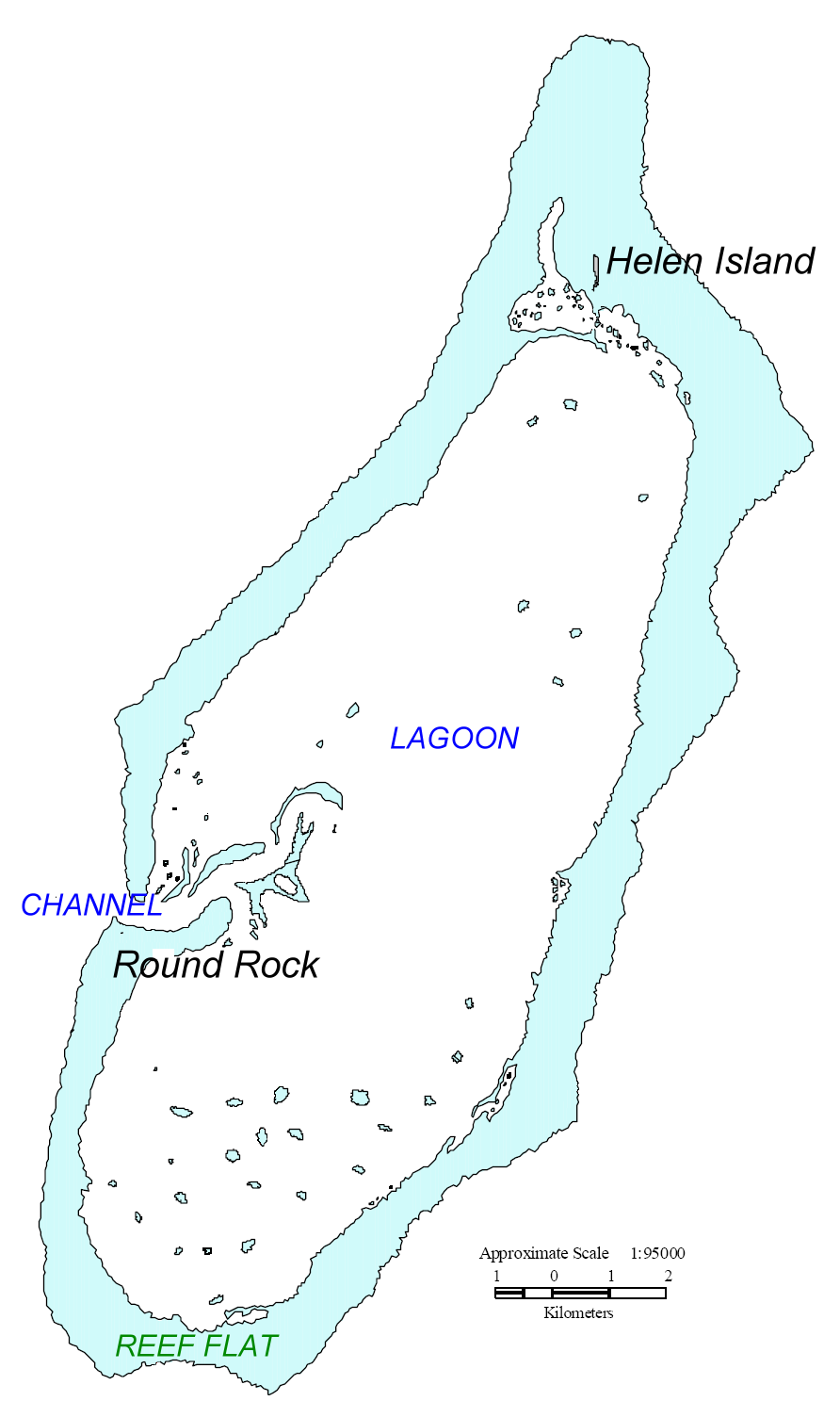
Map of Helen Reef (Hotsarihie)

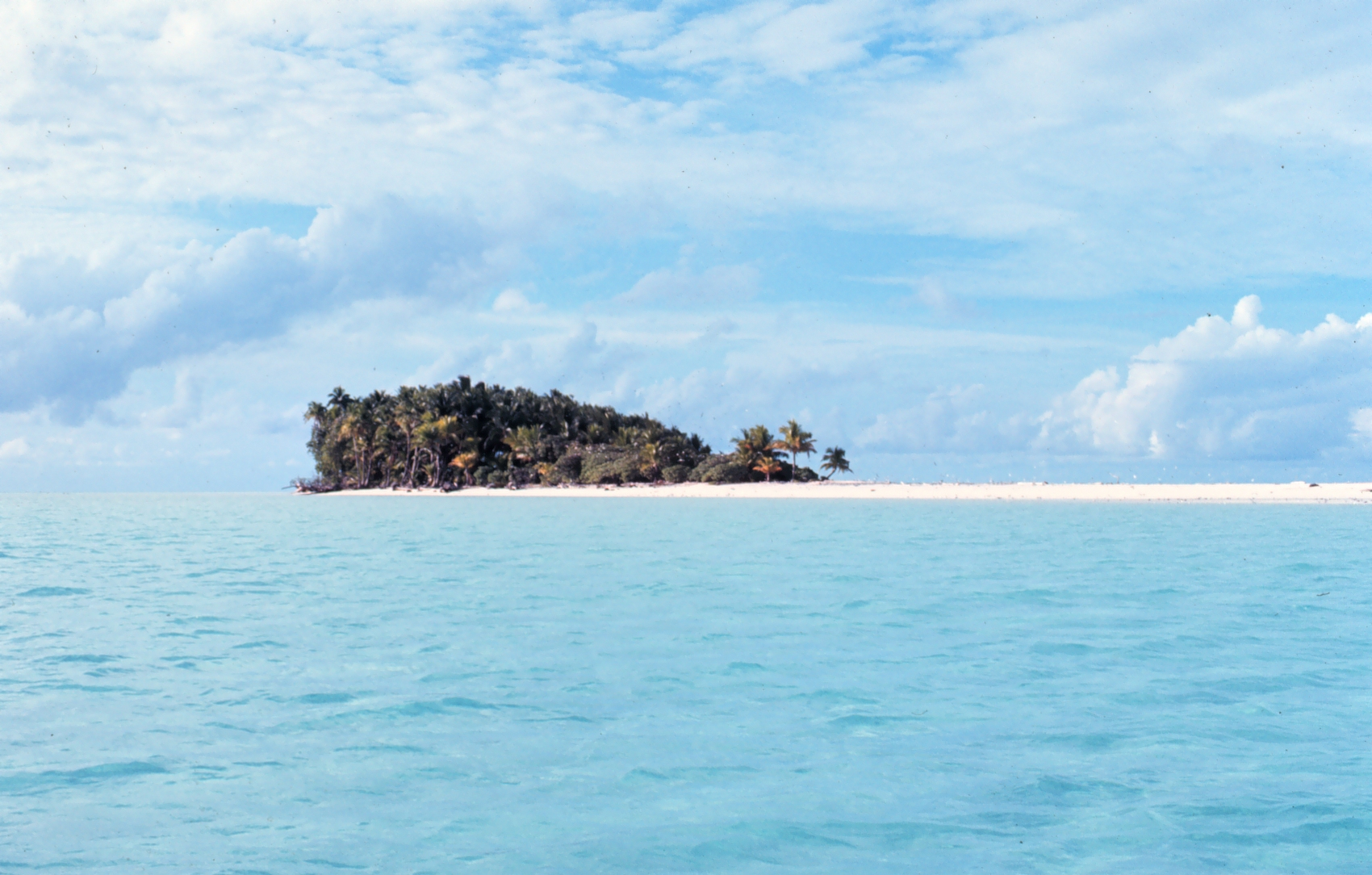
Helen Island

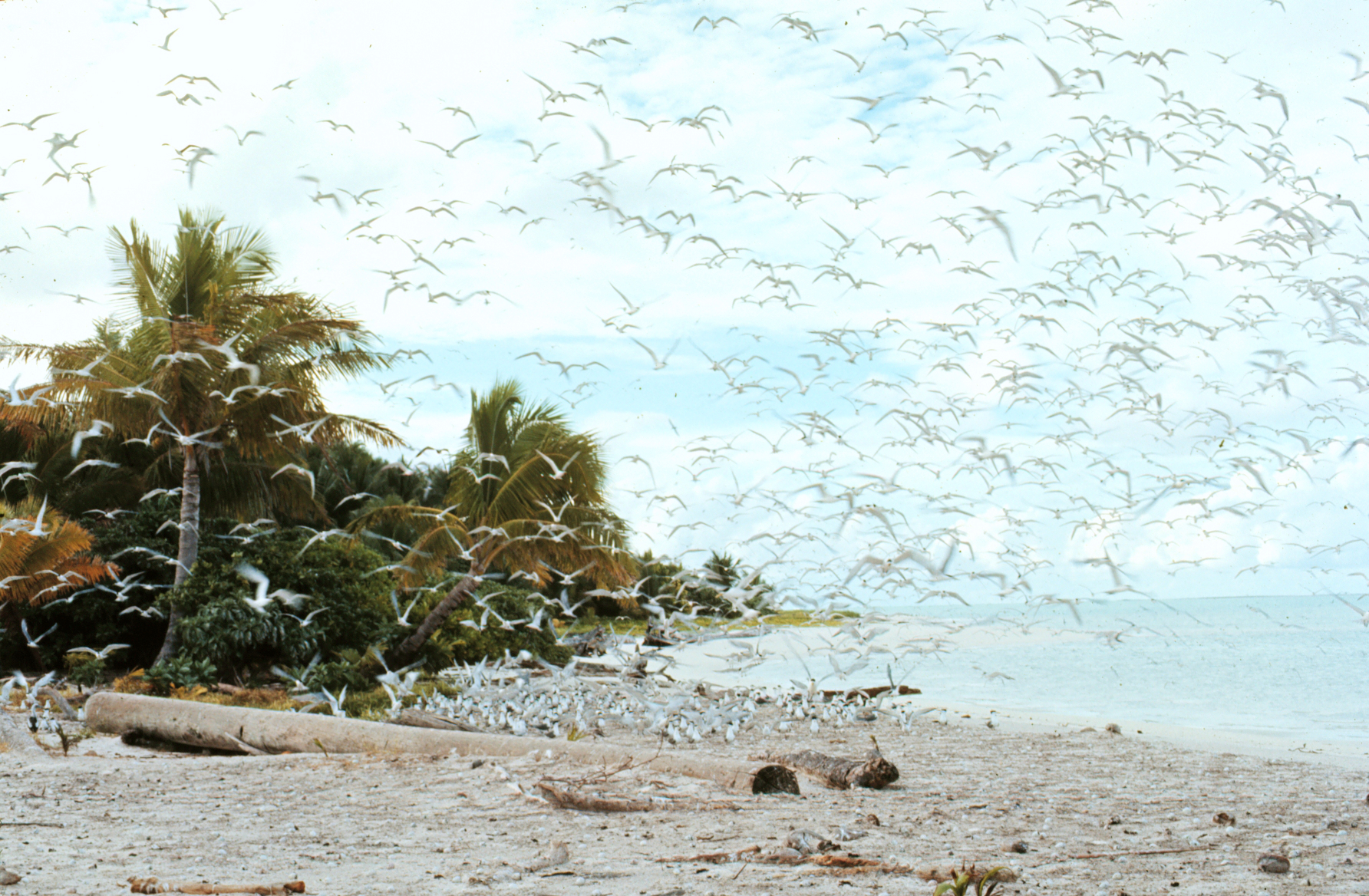
Tern rookery on Helen Island

==== Helen Reef ====
Helen or Helens Reef (Hotsarihie), about 70 km east of Tobi Island, is a largely submerged atoll, with just one islet (Helen Island). The atoll is 25 km long and nearly 10 km wide, with a lagoon area of 103 km² and a total area including reef flat of 163 km². A channel leads into the lagoon from near the middle of the western side of the reef. Immediately south of the channel is Round Rock, which dries. The lagoon has about 85 patch and pinnacle Reefs.

When the tide is falling, the water flows out of the lagoon and over the reef in all directions until the reef is uncovered, and then flows out through the channel on the western side. On the rising tide, a reverse effect is noted. Only a few parts of the reef are completely dry.

==== Helen Island ====
Helen Island was discovered by the Spanish naval officer Felipe Tompson in 1773, who charted it as San Felix shoal. The only island of the reef, it is located near its northern tip. It is tiny in comparison to Helen Reef, about 20 to 40 m wide and 400 m long, or about 0.03 km² of land area. The densely wooded island sits atop a sand dune, which is 0.25 km² in extent and which is moving southeast, falling into the lagoon, at a rate 3 to 4 m per year. The island is uninhabited except for a marine ranger station of Hatohobei State, which was established in the early 1990s on the eastern side of the island, to guard the reef against foreign poachers. The station is permanently occupied by a staff of three.

The island has been designated an Important Bird Area (IBA) by BirdLife International because it supports a breeding colony of black noddies, with some 25,000 birds estimated in 2004. There are also nesting populations of sooty and greater crested terns.

==== Transit Reef ====
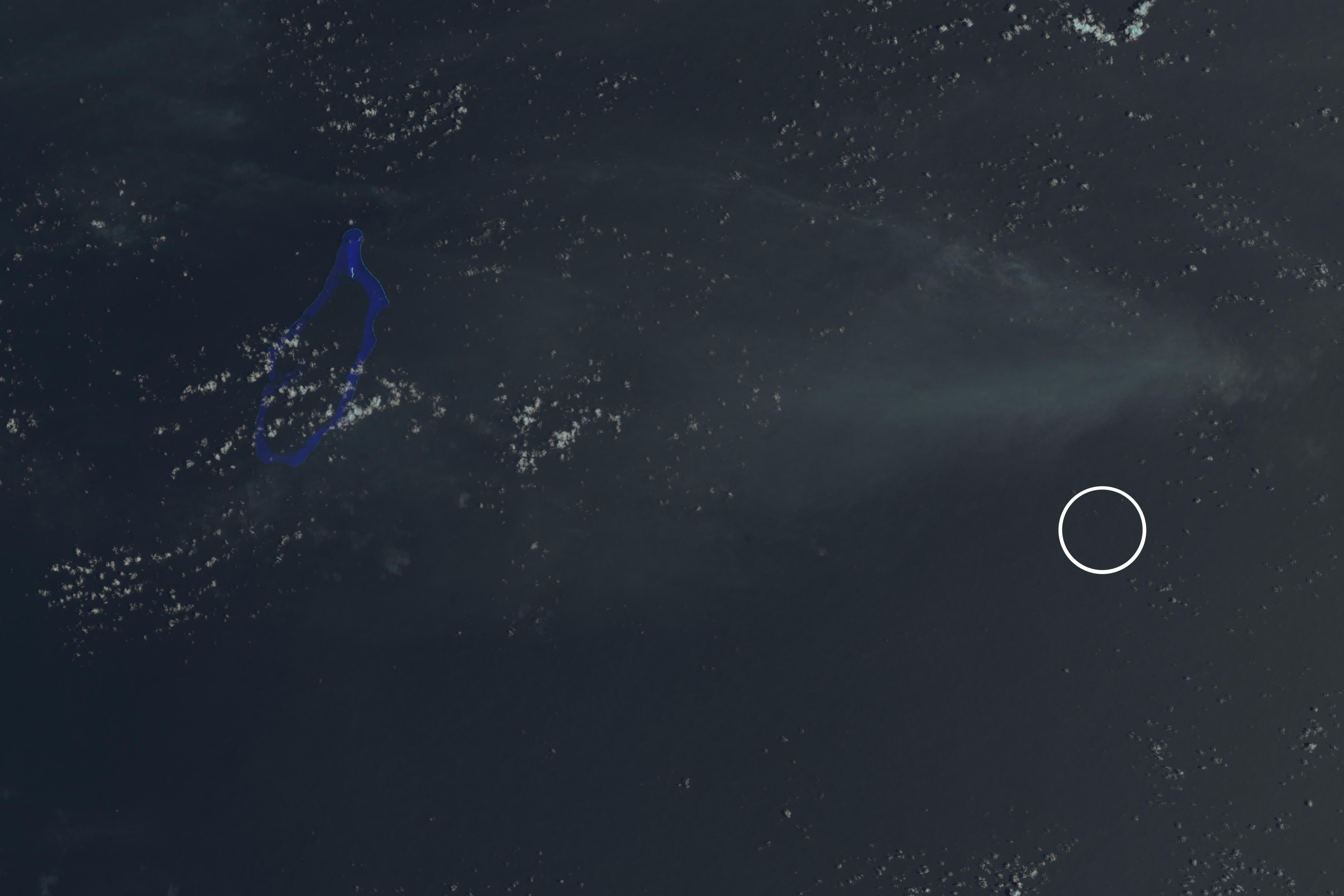
Satellite picture of Helen Reef with supposed location of Transit Reef marked with circle

50 km east of Helen Reef is Transit Reef (Pieraurou), which appears on some maps and which is referenced as an island in the Hatohobei State constitution and constitutes the southernmost feature of Palau. Its existence as island, however, is doubtful, as it is not listed in the current Sailing Directions. The literal translation of its Tobian name Pieraurou is "Sandy Navigation Point", referring to a submerged sand bar rather than a reef or island.

== Traditional villages ==
There is little information available on traditional village patterns in the Southwest Islands. Osborne noted several individual old dwelling places and one concentration of platforms and pathways. There is some information available on traditional fishing practices. The surrounding ocean provided the primary source of protein and was probably intensely exploited prehistorically. Given the limited amount of land, it is expected that almost all of it would have been intensively exploited by settlement or subsistence activities.

== Culture ==
The people of the Southwest Islands and Tochobei (Tobi) share a cultural heritage that shows close ties with peoples of the central Caroline Islands, more than 1000 km to the northeast and on the other side of Palau. The migration of these people to the Southwest Islands is a notable event in the prehistory of the Pacific.

Heimong is the title of the traditional high chief from the state.

== See also ==
- Tobian language
