= Pulo Anna =

Island of Palau, located in the Pacific Ocean

Coordinates: 4°39′34″N 131°57′49″E

Map of Pulo Anna

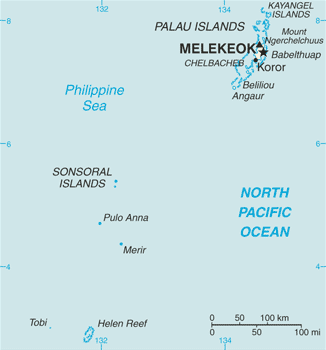
Pulo Anna (geographical position in the island Republic of Palau)

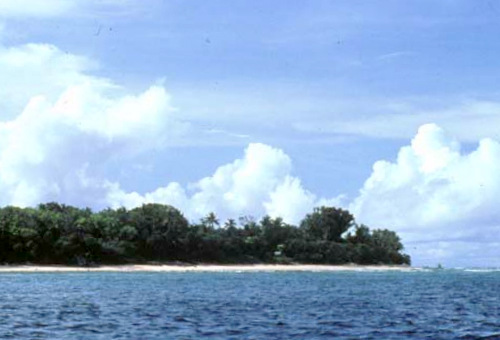
Pulo Anna (shoreline)

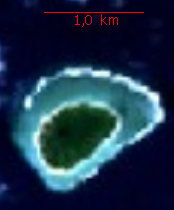
Pulo Anna

Pulo Anna (also called Puro, Pur or Bur) is an island of Palau, located in the Pacific Ocean, about 50 kilometers from Merir Island. It is administered by Sonsorol. The island is about 0.8 kilometers long and 0.5 kilometers wide, with an area of less than 0.5 square kilometers. Its highest point rises 6 meters above sea level, and it is populated by only very few people.

== History ==
From 1901 to 1914, the island was part of the German protectorates in the South Seas. After typhoon damage in 1904, the population was temporarily resettled on another island in Palau.

== See also ==
- List of islands of Palau
