= Filipinos in Palau =

Total population
- 4,000–7,000

Regions with significant populations
- Palau; 39% of Palau population (2022)

Languages
- Tagalog, Palauan, English (Philippine and Palauan), other Philippine languages, Spanish

Religion
- Mostly Roman Catholicism · Protestantism.

Related ethnic groups
- Filipino people, Overseas Filipinos, Austronesian peoples

Filipinos in Palau consist of contract workers from the Philippines and their dependents living in Palau. The approximately 7,000 Filipinos living in Palau make up about 35% of the entire population of Palau, and make up the second-largest ethnic group after Palauans. In addition, the Tagalog language is the fourth most-spoken language in Palau.

== History ==
Filipinos first arrived in Palau during the Spanish colonial period, when Palau was still part of the Captaincy General of the Philippines (1565–1898). Palau was integrated to the First Philippine Republic near the end of the Philippine Revolution, but the Philippines lost control after their defeat in the Philippine-American War. After World War II there was a resurgence of Filipino people coming to Palau. They served as serviceman in the United States Navy, and came to work at a power plant. In the 1970s, about 200 Filipinos were living and working in Palau, mostly in teaching and professional positions. Today, there are 4,495 Filipinos that live legally in Palau, and twenty-one of them are permanent residents, while the rest, 4,434, are migrant workers. However, the Philippine Overseas Labor Office in Saipan estimates that 80% of Filipinos living in Palau are undocumented immigrants. In 2007, four people, two Filipinos and two Taiwanese, were arrested, jailed and fined for smuggling several Filipinos into Palau.

== Filipino labor ==
Filipinos in Palau are employed in the agricultural, construction, education, engineering, fishing, hotel, medical, restaurant, and tourism sectors or as domestic helpers. The minimum monthly wages that a Filipino would receive is about US$250. There is no Philippine Department of Labor and Employment office in Palau, but the Filipino Embassy works with the government of Palau to coordinate labour recruitment. Ramoncito Mariño, the Filipino ambassador to Palau said, "...labor problems usually start in the recruitment itself. So we make sure that the Palauan employers are in touch with legal recruiters who can produce qualified workers. It would also be another problem if the ones sent here are not qualified for their jobs."

== See also ==
- Palau–Philippines relations
