= Dongosaru =

Palauan village in Sonsorol

Coordinates: 5.326°N 132.2199°E

Dongosaru is a village in Palau, and the capital of the state of Sonsorol. The population of the village as of 2014 was about 42.
