= Merir =

Uninhabited Island in Sonsorol State, Palau

Coordinates: 4°19′N 132°19′E

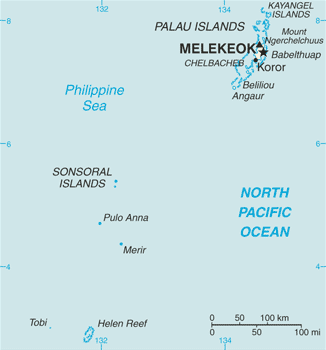
Merir's geographical position in the island Republic of Palau.

Merir, or Melieli, is a small outlying island of the Palau group, in the western Pacific Ocean. The island has an area of 0.90 square kilometres (0.35 sq mi) and is very long and narrow, stretching approximately 2.4 kilometres (1.5 mi) from north to south but only approximately 667 metres (2,190 ft) at its widest point. It is uninhabited. An abandoned village which previously hosted a radio station lies in the northwest part of the island.

The island itself is covered with trees but it is surrounded by a beach around which is a lagoon. Outside this, the whole is surrounded by a coral reef and the open ocean.

Together with the islands of Sonsorol and Fana, which are 110 kilometres (59 nmi; 68 mi) to the northwest, and the island of Pulo Anna 50 kilometres (27 nmi; 31 mi) away, Merir forms the state of Sonsorol in the Republic of Palau.

The first recorded sighting of Merir by Europeans was by the Spanish missionary expedition commanded by Sargento Mayor Francisco Padilla on board of the patache Santísima Trinidad in November 1710.

== Gallery ==
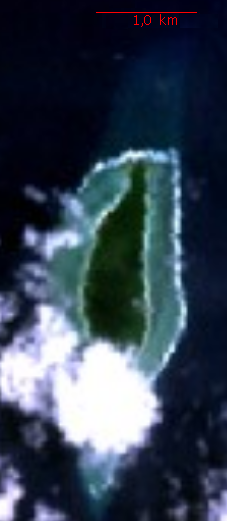
Satellite view of the Island of Merir

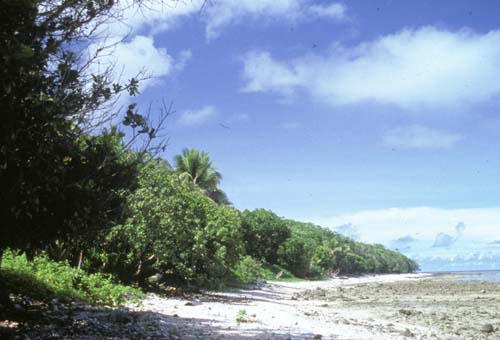
Luxuriant vegetation and beach scene in western Merir

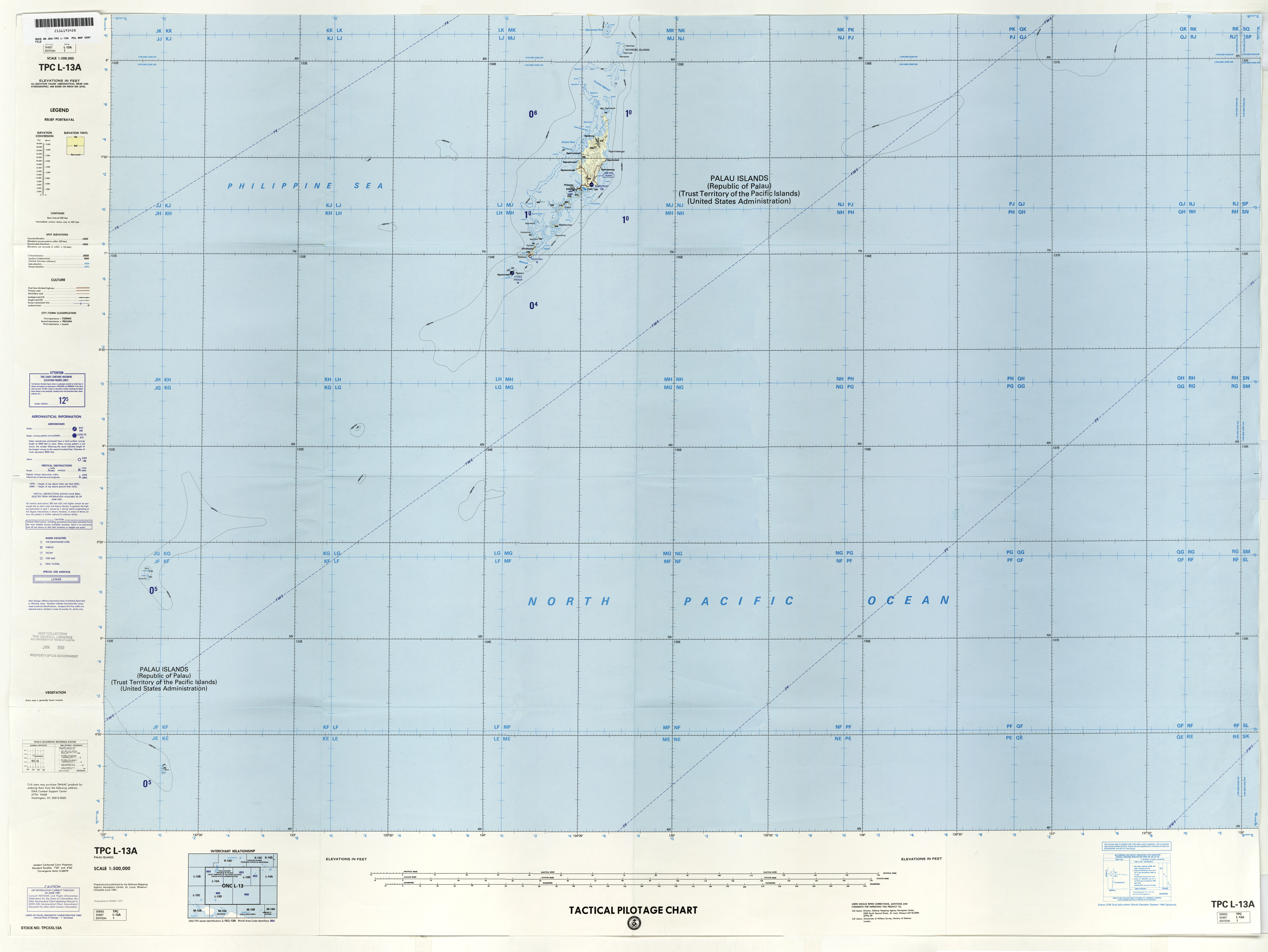
Map including Merir (DMA, 1991)
