= Palau =

Country in the Western Pacific

Republic of Palau Beluu er a Belau
- Flag Coat of arms
- Anthem: Belau rekid "Our Palau"
- Status: Sovereign state and UN member state under a Compact of Free Association with the United States (associated state)
- Capital: Ngerulmud; 7°30′N 134°37′E
- Largest city: Koror; 7°20′N 134°29′E
- Official languages: Palauan; English
- Recognized regional languages: Sonsorolese; Tobian; Japanese (Note: Japanese is an official language per the 1982 constitution of Angaur Island. However, it is no longer spoken. Sonsorolese and Tobian are official in their respective states.)
- Ethnic groups (2020 census): 65.2% Palauan; 31.6% Asian; 1.2% Carolinian; 1.0% European; 0.9% other
- Religion (2020 census): 78.7% Christianity; 10.1% no religion; 5.1% Modekngei; 4.9% Islam; 1.2% other
- Demonym: Palauan
- Government: Unitary presidential republic under a non-partisan democracy
  - President: Surangel Whipps Jr.
  - Vice President: Raynold Oilouch
- Legislature: Palau National Congress
  - Upper house: Senate
  - Lower house: House of Delegates

Independence from the United States
  - Trusteeship: 18 July 1947
  - Establishment of the Republic of Palau: 1 January 1981
  - Compact of Free Association: 1 October 1994

Area
  - Total: 459 km^{2} (177 sq mi) (180th)
  - Water (%): negligible

Population
  - 2025 estimate: 17,663 (192nd)
  - 2021 census: 16,766
  - Density: 38.375/km^{2} (99.4/sq mi) (182nd)
- GDP (PPP): 2024 estimate
  - Total: ▲$308 million
  - Per capita: ▲$18,209 (81st)
- GDP (nominal): 2024 estimate
  - Total: ▲$322 million
  - Per capita: ▲$17,448
- HDI (2023): 0.786 high (84th)
- Currency: United States dollar (USD)
- Time zone: UTC+9 (PWT)
- Date format: mm/dd/yyyy
- Calling code: +680
- ISO 3166 code: PW
- Internet TLD: .pw
- Website; PalauGov.pw

Palau, (Note: /pəˈlaʊ/; Palauan: Belau, pronounced [ˈbɛlaw]) officially the Republic of Palau, (Note: Palauan: Beluu er a Belau) is an island country located in the Micronesia subregion of Oceania in the western Pacific Ocean. The Republic of Palau consists of approximately 340 islands and is the western part of the Caroline Islands, while the eastern and central parts make up the Federated States of Micronesia.

It has a total area of 466 square kilometers (180 sq mi), making it the sixteenth smallest country in the world. The most populous island is Koror, home to the country's most populous city of the same name. The capital, Ngerulmud, is located on the largest island of Babeldaob, in Melekeok State. Palau shares maritime boundaries with international waters to the north, the Federated States of Micronesia to the east, Indonesia to the south, and the Philippines to the northwest.

The country was originally settled approximately 1,000 BCE by migrants from Maritime Southeast Asia. Palau was first drawn on a European map by the Bohemian missionary Paul Klein based on a description given by a group of Palauans shipwrecked on the Philippine coast on Samar. The Palau islands were made part of the Spanish East Indies in 1885. Following Spain's defeat in the Spanish–American War in 1898, the islands were sold to Germany in 1899 under the terms of the German–Spanish Treaty, where they were administered as part of German New Guinea.

After World War I, the islands were made a part of the Japanese-ruled South Seas Mandate by the League of Nations. During World War II, skirmishes including the major Battle of Peleliu were fought between American and Japanese troops as part of the Mariana and Palau Islands campaign. Along with other Pacific Islands, Palau was made a part of the United States–governed Trust Territory of the Pacific Islands in 1947. Having voted in a referendum against joining the Federated States of Micronesia in 1978, the islands gained full sovereignty in 1994 under a Compact of Free Association with the United States.

Politically, Palau is a presidential republic in free association with the United States, which provides defense, funding, and access to social services. Legislative power is concentrated in the bicameral Palau National Congress. Palau's economy is based mainly on tourism, subsistence agriculture, and fishing, with a significant portion of gross national product (GNP) derived from foreign aid. The country uses the United States dollar as its official currency. The islands' culture mixes Micronesian, Melanesian, Asian, and Western elements. Ethnic Palauans, the majority of the population, are of mixed Micronesian, Melanesian, and Austronesian descent. A smaller proportion of the population is of Japanese descent. The country's two official languages are Palauan (a member of the Austronesian language family) and English. The minor Micronesian languages Sonsorolese and Tobian, as well as Japanese, are recognized at the state level.

== Etymology ==
The name for the islands in the Palauan language, Belau, derives from the Palauan word for "village", beluu (thus ultimately from Proto-Austronesian *banua), or from aibebelau ("indirect replies"), relating to a creation myth. The name "Palau" originated in the Spanish Los Palaos, eventually entering English via the German Palau. An archaic name for the islands in English was the "Pelew Islands". The name of the country "Palau" is most likely not derived from the Malay word Pulau (island), despite the similarity in its word form.

== History ==
Palau History Timeline

Bourbon Spain (Spanish East Indies) 1710–1785
Kingdom of Spain (Spanish East Indies) 1785–1808
Napoleonic Spain (Spanish East Indies) 1808–1813
Kingdom of Spain (Spanish East Indies) 1813–1873
First Spanish Republic (Spanish East Indies) 1873–1874
Kingdom of Spain (Spanish East Indies) 1873–1899
First Philippine Republic January 23–February 12, 1899
German Empire (German New Guinea) 1899–1914
Empire of Japan (South Seas Mandate) 1914–1944
United States 1944–1962
United Nations (Trust Territory of the Pacific Islands) 1947–1965
United Nations (Trust Territory of the Pacific Islands) 1965–1979
Palau 1981–present

=== Early history ===
Palau was originally settled between the 3rd and 2nd millennia BCE by Austronesian peoples, most likely from what is now the Philippines or Indonesia. Sonsorol was sighted by the Spanish as early as 1521, when the Spanish mission of the Trinidad, the flagship of Ferdinand Magellan's voyage of circumnavigation, sighted two small islands around the 5th parallel north, naming them "San Juan".

In December 1696, a group of sailors from the Caroline Islands were stranded on Samar, near Guiuan, when they met European missionary Paul Klein. Using pebbles, the sailors attempted to show Klein the approximate location and size of the islands. He used this information to produce the first European map of the Palau area. Klein sent the map to Jesuit Superior General, along with a letter detailing the names of the islands, the culture of the people, and his experiences with them.

=== Spanish era ===
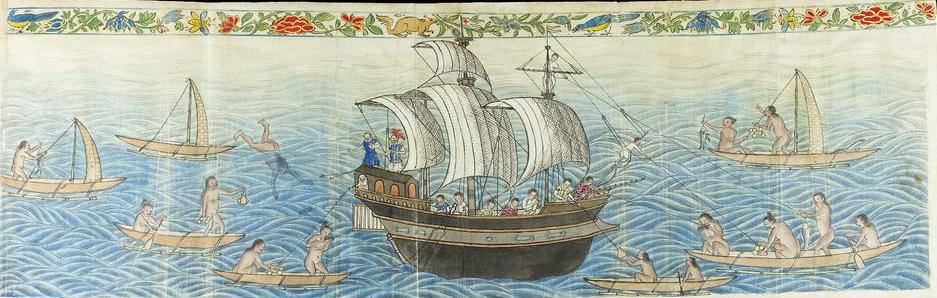
Manila galleon in the Marianas and Carolinas, c. 1590 Boxer Codex

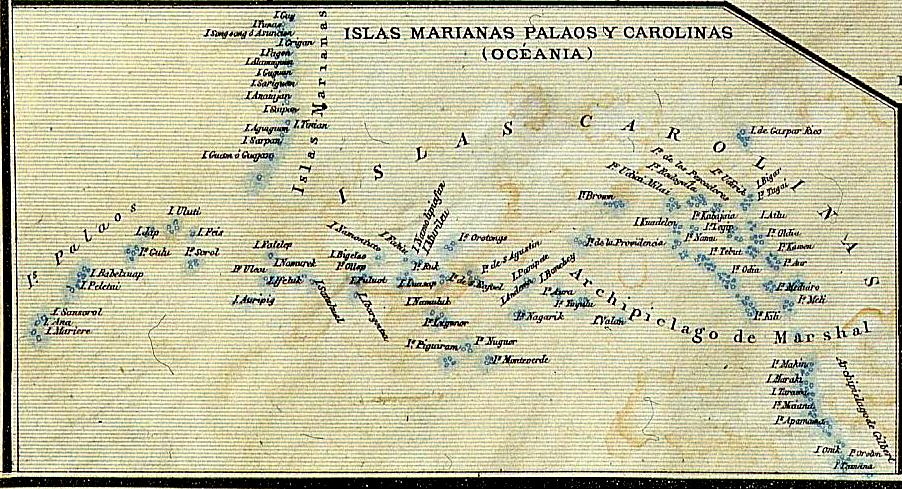
Map of Palau Islands of the Spanish East Indies (excluding the Philippine Islands), 1888

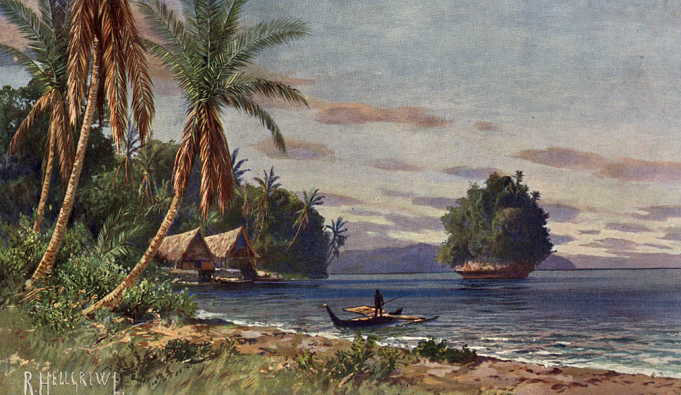
Village on the Palau Islands, painting by Rudolf Hellgrewe c. 1908

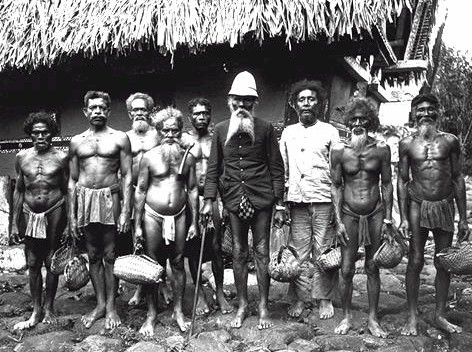
Koror chiefs in 1915

The Klein map and letter caused a vast interest in the new islands. Another letter written by Fr. Andrés Serrano was sent to Europe in 1705, essentially copying the information given by Klein. The letters resulted in three unsuccessful Jesuit attempts to travel to Palau from Spanish Philippines in 1700, 1708, and 1709. The islands were first visited by the Jesuit expedition led by Francisco Padilla on 30 November 1710. The expedition ended with the stranding of the two priests, Jacques Du Beron and Joseph Cortyl, on the coast of Sonsorol, because the mother ship Santísima Trinidad was driven to Mindanao by a storm. Another ship was sent from Guam in 1711 to save them only to capsize, causing the death of three more Jesuit priests. The failure of these missions gave Palau the original Spanish name Islas Encantadas (Enchanted Islands).

=== Transitions era ===
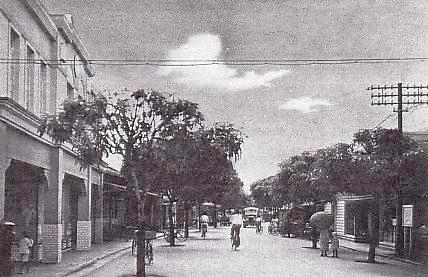
Palau in Japanese mandate

British traders became regular visitors to Palau in the 18th century (the British East India Company packet ship Antelope shipwrecked off Ulong Island in 1783, leading to Prince Lee Boo's visit to London), followed by expanding Spanish influence in the 19th century. Palau, under the name Palaos, was included in the Malolos Congress in 1898, the first revolutionary congress in the Philippines, which wanted full independence from colonialists. Palau was part of the Spanish East Indies headquartered in the Spanish Philippines. Palau had one appointed member to the Congress. The Malolos Congress also supported the right of Palau to self-determination if ever it wished to pursue such a path. The term used in the Congress, Palaos, referred to the Pacific islands that were part of Philippine jurisdiction at the time. These islands include the Marshall Islands, Mariana Islands, and the Caroline Islands including Palau. At the time, Palau was the main center for trade in the area, thus, the entire area also became known as Palaos.

Later in 1899 as part of the Caroline Islands, Palau was sold by the Spanish Empire to the German Empire as part of German New Guinea in the German–Spanish Treaty (1899). During World War I, the Japanese Empire annexed the islands after seizing them from Germany in 1914. Following World War I, the League of Nations formally placed the islands under Japanese administration as part of the South Seas Mandate. In World War II, Palau was used by Japan to support its 1941 invasion of the Philippines, which succeeded in 1942. The invasion overthrew the American-installed Commonwealth government in the Philippines and installed the Japanese-backed Second Philippine Republic in 1943.

=== United States era ===
During World War II, the United States captured Palau from Japan in 1944 after the costly Battle of Peleliu, when more than 2,000 Americans and 10,000 Japanese were killed, and later the Battle of Angaur. In 1945–1946, the United States re-established control of the Philippines and managed Palau through the Philippine capital of Manila. By the latter half of 1946, however, the Philippines was granted full independence with the formation of the Third Republic of the Philippines, shifting the U.S. Far West Pacific capital to Guam. Palau was passed formally to the United States under United Nations auspices in 1947 as part of the Trust Territory of the Pacific Islands established pursuant to Security Council Resolution 21.

=== Independence ===
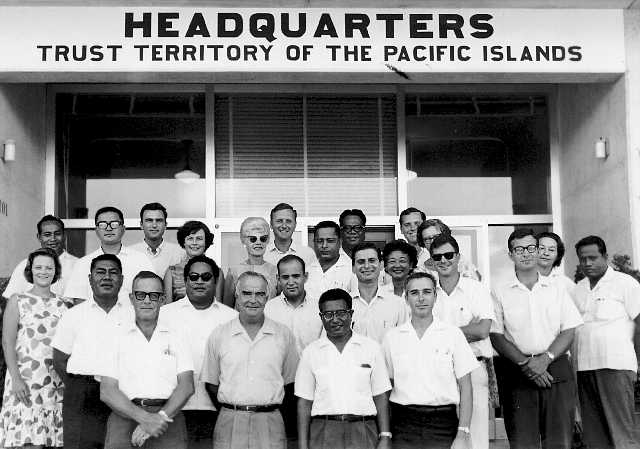
TTPI High Commissioner and staff, 1960s

Four of the Trust Territory districts joined and formed the Federated States of Micronesia in 1979, but the districts of Palau and the Marshall Islands voted against the proposed constitution. Palau, the westernmost cluster of the Carolines, instead opted for independent status in 1978, which was widely supported by the Philippines, Taiwan, and Japan. It approved a new constitution and became the Republic of Palau on 1 January 1981. It signed a Compact of Free Association with the United States in 1982. In the same year, Palau became one of the founding members of the Nauru Agreement. The compact entered into force on 1 October 1994, concluding Palau's transition from trusteeship to independence as the last portion of the Trust Territory of the Pacific Islands to secure its independence pursuant to Security Council Resolution 956. Palau also became a member of the Pacific Islands Forum but withdrew in February 2021 after a dispute regarding Henry Puna's election as the forum's secretary-general. Legislation making Palau an "offshore" financial center was passed by the U.S. Senate in 1998.

In 2005, Palau led the Micronesia Challenge, which would conserve 30% of near-shore coastal waters and 20% of forest land of participating countries by 2020. In 2009, Palau created the world's first shark sanctuary, banning commercial shark fishing within its waters. In 2012, the Rock Islands of Palau was declared as a UNESCO World Heritage Site.

In 2015, Palau became a member of the Climate Vulnerable Forum under the chairmanship of the Philippines, and at the same time, the country officially protected 80% of its water resources, becoming the first country to do so. The protection of its water resources made significant increases in the country's economy in less than two years. In 2017, it became the first state in the world to establish an eco-promise, known as the Palau Pledge, which is stamped on local and foreign passports. In 2018, Palau and the Philippines began re-connecting their economic and diplomatic relations. The Philippines supported Palau to become an observer state in ASEAN.

== Politics and government ==
Capitol of Palau, the seat of government.

Palau is a democratic republic. The President of Palau is both head of state and head of government. Executive power is exercised by the government, while legislative power is vested in both the government and the Palau National Congress. The judiciary is independent of the executive and the legislature. Palau adopted a constitution in 1981.

The Compact of Free Association between the United States and Palau sets forth the free and voluntary association of their governments. It primarily focuses on the issues of government, economic, security, and defense relations. Palau has no independent military, relying on the United States for its defense. Under the compact, the American military was granted access to the islands for 50 years. The U.S. Navy role is minimal, limited to a handful of Navy Seabees (construction engineers). The U.S. Coast Guard patrols in national waters. The government has agreed to host a large United States Air Force high-frequency radar station in Palau, an over-the-horizon-radar system costing well over $100 million, which is expected to be operational in 2026.

=== Foreign relations ===
As a sovereign state, Palau conducts its own foreign relations. Since independence, Palau has established diplomatic relations with numerous countries, including many of its Pacific neighbors, like Micronesia and the Philippines. On 29 November 1994, the United Nations Security Council passed Resolution 963 recommending Palau's admission to the United Nations. The United Nations General Assembly approved admission for Palau pursuant to Resolution 49/63 on 15 December 1994. Palau has since joined several other international organizations. In September 2006, Palau hosted the first Taiwan-Pacific Allies Summit. Its president has made official visits to other Pacific countries, including Japan. Taiwan has provided financial support for Palau to maintain a presence at international fora, including the United Nations and United Nations Climate Change Conference.

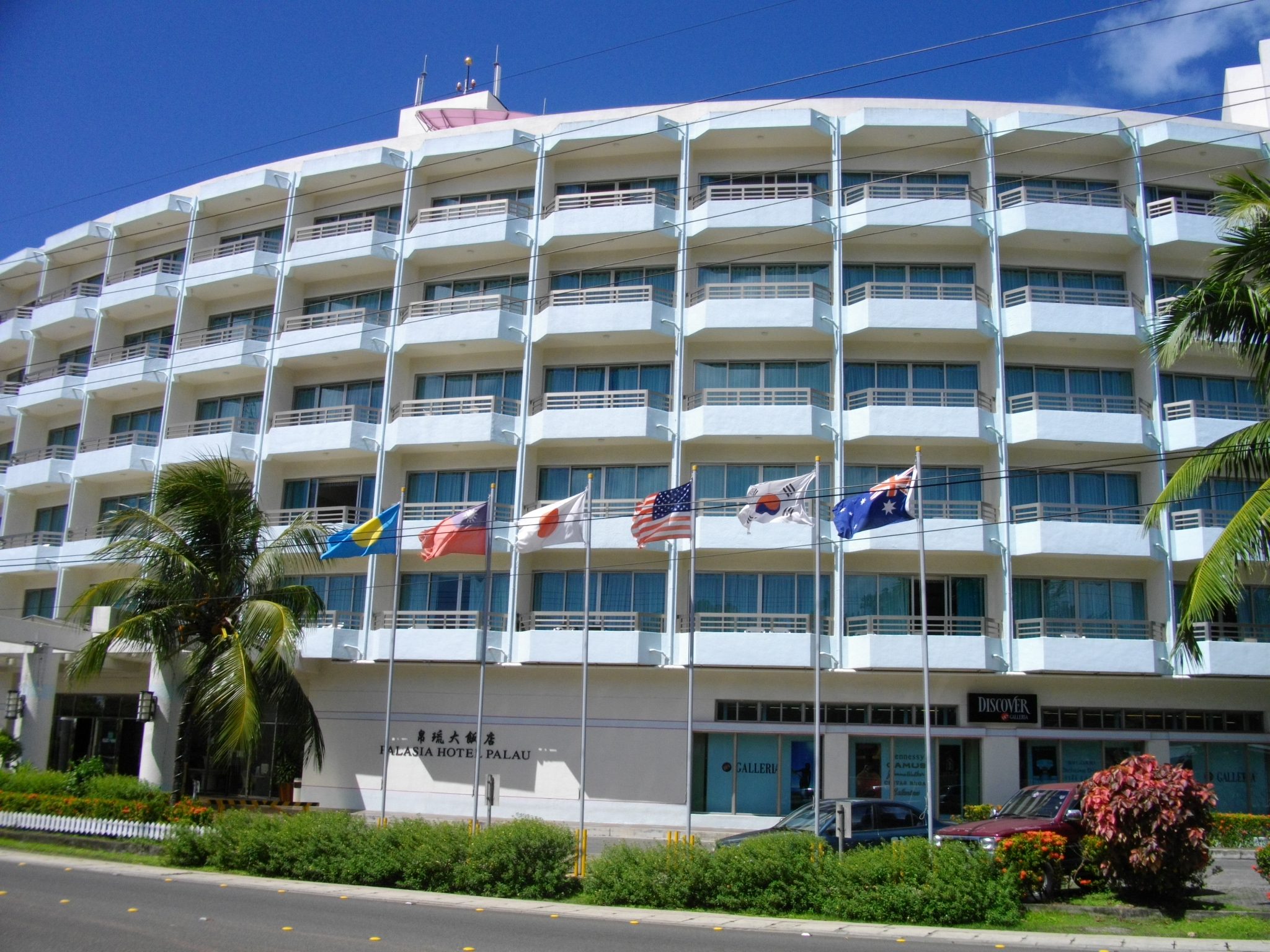
Flags of countries who have foreign relations with Palau, Palasia Hotel

The United States maintains a diplomatic delegation and an embassy in Palau, but many aspects of the countries' relationship have to do with compact-funded projects, which are the responsibility of the U.S. Department of the Interior's Office of Insular Affairs. For example, as part of this compact, Palau was granted ZIP Codes 96939 and 96940, along with regular U.S. Mail delivery. In international politics, Palau often votes in tandem with the United States on United Nations General Assembly resolutions.

Palau has maintained close ties with Japan, which has funded infrastructure projects, including the Koror–Babeldaob Bridge. In 2015, Emperor Akihito and Empress Michiko visited Peleliu to honor the 70th anniversary of World War II.

In 1981, Palau voted for the world's first nuclear-free constitution. This constitution banned the use, storage, and disposal of nuclear, toxic chemical, gas, and biological weapons without first being approved by a 75 percent majority in a referendum. This ban delayed Palau's transition to independence because while negotiating the compact, the U.S. insisted on the option to operate nuclear-propelled vessels and store nuclear weapons within the territory, prompting campaigns for independence. In 2017, Palau signed the United Nations Treaty on the Prohibition of Nuclear Weapons.

Palau is a member of the Nauru Agreement for the Management of Fisheries. The Philippines, a neighboring ally of Palau to the west has expressed its intent to back Palau if ever it wishes to join ASEAN.

In June 2009, Palau announced that it would accept up to seventeen Uyghurs who had previously been detained by the American military at Guantanamo Bay, with some American compensation for the cost of their upkeep. Only one of the Uyghurs initially agreed to resettlement, but by the end of October, six of the seventeen had been transferred to Palau. An aid agreement with the United States, finalized in January 2010, was reported to be unrelated to the Uyghur agreement.

=== Administrative divisions ===
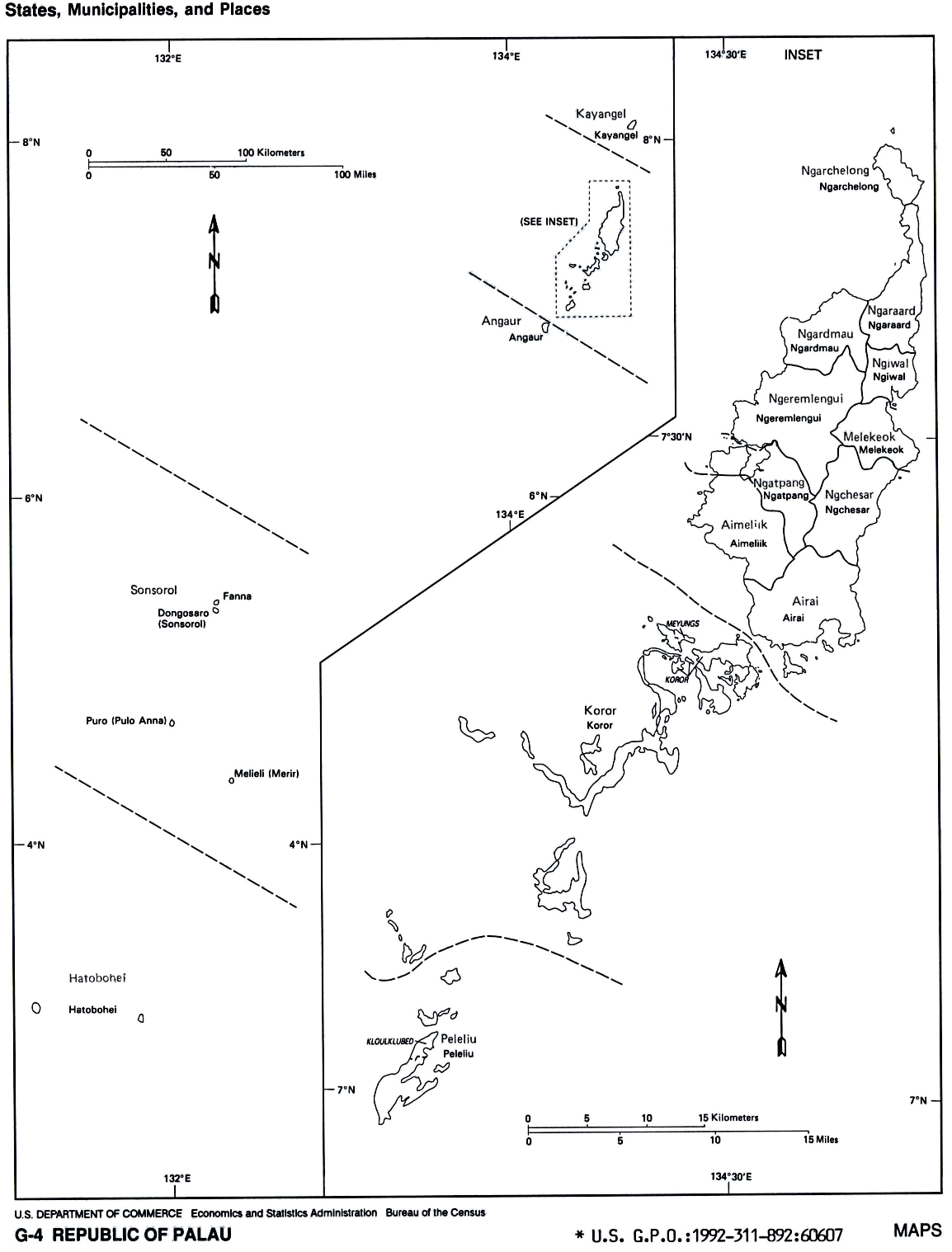
The sixteen states of Palau

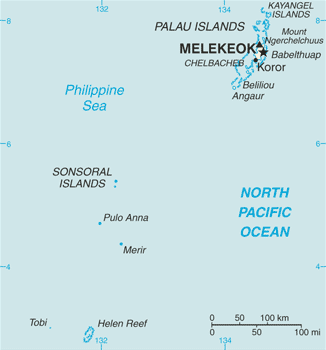
Republic of Palau

Palau is divided into sixteen states (until 1984 called municipalities). Koror is by far the largest, hosting a majority of the population. The states listed below are arranged approximately from north to south with their areas (in square kilometers) and 2015 and 2020 Census populations.

State	Area (km^{2})	Population 2015 Census	Population 2020 Census	Notes
Kayangel	1.7	54	41	Comprises the islands of Kayangel Atoll
Ngarchelong	11.2	316	384	At the northern end of Babeldaob Island
Ngaraard	34	413	396	At the northern end of Babeldaob Island, just south of Ngarchelong State
Ngardmau	34	185	238	On the western side of Babeldaob Island
Ngaremlengui	68	350	349	On the western side of Babeldaob Island
Ngatpang	33	282	289	On the western side of Babeldaob Island
Ngiwal	17	282	312	On the eastern side of Babeldaob Island
Melekeok	26	277	318	On the eastern side of Babeldaob Island
Ngchesar	43	291	319	On the eastern side of Babeldaob Island
Aimeliik	44	334	363	In the southwestern part of Babeldaob Island
Airai	59	2,455	2,529	In the southeastern part of Babeldaob Island
Koror	60.52	11,444	11,199	Comprises Koror, Ngerekebesang, and Malakal Islands, plus the Rock Islands (Chelbacheb, including Eil Malk) to the southwest
Peleliu	22.3	484	470	Comprises Peleliu Island and some islets to its north, notably Ngercheu
Angaur	8.06	119	114	Angaur Island, 12 km south of Peleliu
Sonsorol	3.1	40	53	Comprises Sonsorol and the uninhabited Fanna, Pulo Anna and Merir Islands
Hatohobei	0.9	25	39	Comprises Tobi Island and the uninhabited Helen Reef

Historically, Palau's Rock Islands have been part of the State of Koror.

=== Maritime law enforcement ===
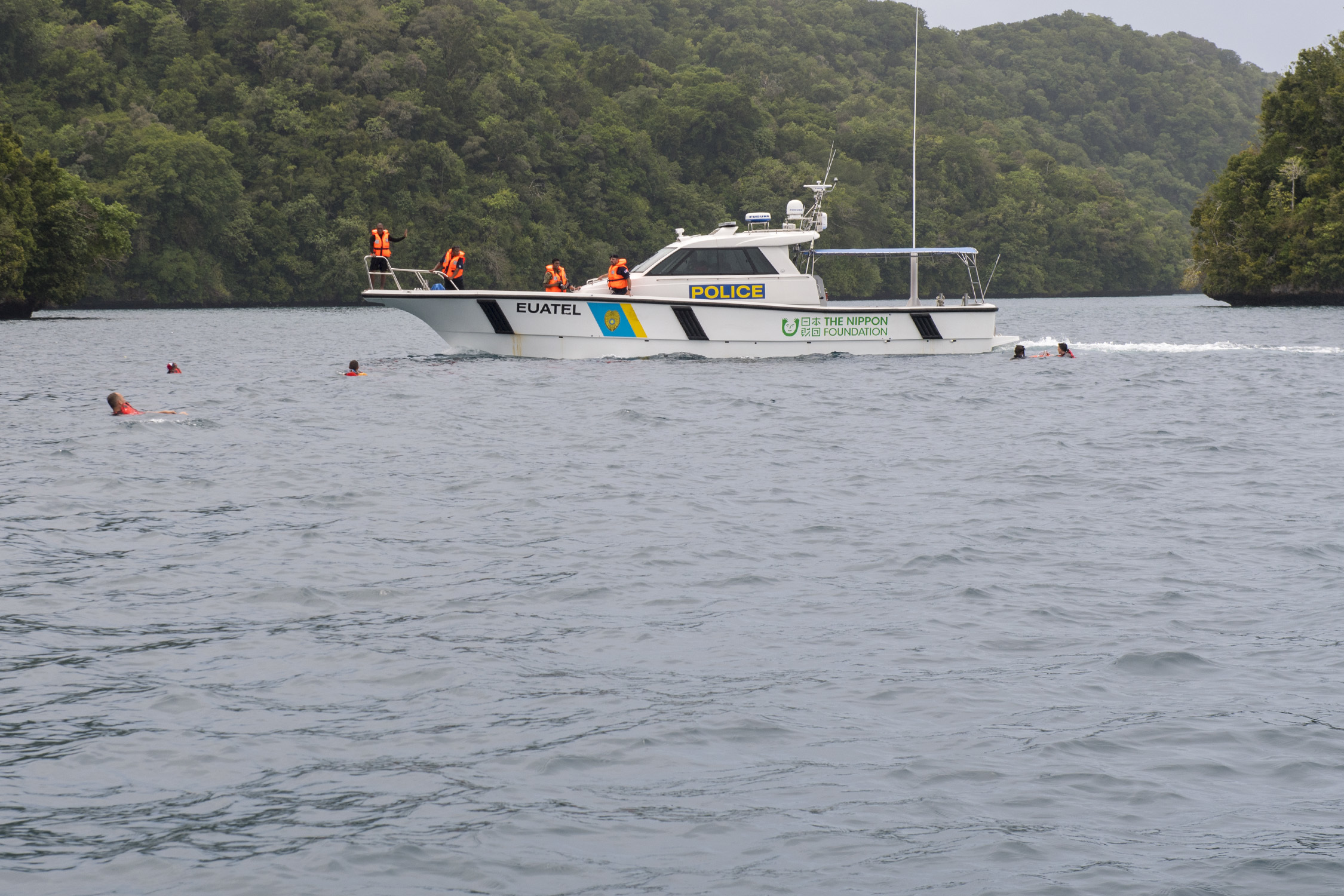
The Euatel, Kabekl M'tal and Bul provide littoral fishery protection.

Palau's Division of Marine Law Enforcement patrols the nation's 600,000 square kilometers (230,000 square miles) exclusive economic zone. They operate two long-range patrol boats, the Kedam and the Remeliik II, to hunt for poachers and unlicensed fishermen. Smaller boats are used for littoral operations. They are based on Koror.

=== Political economy ===
In the view of Islands Society president Michael Walsh, Palau is a key example of the successes of modern state-building in the Indo-Pacific region. It has successfully transitioned peacefully from colonial rule to full admission to the United Nations. Palau has maintained strong foreign relations with its neighbors in its region of Oceania. There have also been pushes for Palau to have observer status to the ASEAN as a demonstration of its growing influence in the region. However, Palau's peaceful transition to fully autonomous sovereign state is not without debate.

Palau is hugely reliant on international aid, as demonstrated by President Surangel Whipps Jr address to the UN General Assembly in 2021. American influence has led some to contest that there are challenges to its sovereignty with its reliance on the American military under the Compact of Free Association, although not officially designated a de facto protectorate or otherwise. American influence has resulted in huge changes to Palau's society, economy, and political processes, and as such Palau may not yet be seen as a fully independent state or a fully realized success of modern state-building.

== Geography ==
Share of forest area in total land area, top countries (2021). Palau has the fifth highest percentage of forest cover in the world.

Palau's territory consists of an archipelago located in the Pacific Ocean. Its most populous islands are Angaur, Babeldaob, Koror and Peleliu. The latter three lie together within the same barrier reef, while Angaur is an oceanic island several kilometers to the south. About two-thirds of the population lives on Koror. The coral atoll of Kayangel is north of these islands, while the uninhabited Rock Islands (about 200) are west of the main island group. A remote group of six islands, known as the Southwest Islands, some 604 kilometers (375 miles) from the main islands, make up the states of Hatohobei and Sonsorol.

=== Climate ===
Palau has a tropical rainforest climate with an annual mean temperature of 28 °C (82 °F). Rainfall is heavy throughout the year, averaging 3,800 mm (150 in). The average humidity is 82% and, although rain falls more frequently between June and October, there is still much sunshine. Palau lies on the edge of the typhoon belt. Tropical disturbances frequently develop near Palau every year, but significant tropical cyclones are quite rare. Mike, Bopha and Haiyan are the only systems that struck Palau as typhoons on record.

Climate data for Palau Islands (1961–1990)
Month	Jan	Feb	Mar	Apr	May	Jun	Jul	Aug	Sep	Oct	Nov	Dec	Year
Mean daily maximum °C (°F)	30.6 (87.1)	30.6 (87.1)	30.9 (87.6)	31.3 (88.3)	31.4 (88.5)	31.0 (87.8)	30.6 (87.1)	30.7 (87.3)	30.9 (87.6)	31.1 (88.0)	31.4 (88.5)	31.1 (88.0)	31.0 (87.7)
Daily mean °C (°F)	27.3 (81.1)	27.2 (81.0)	27.5 (81.5)	27.9 (82.2)	28.0 (82.4)	27.6 (81.7)	27.4 (81.3)	27.5 (81.5)	27.7 (81.9)	27.7 (81.9)	27.9 (82.2)	27.7 (81.9)	27.6 (81.7)
Mean daily minimum °C (°F)	23.9 (75.0)	23.9 (75.0)	24.1 (75.4)	24.4 (75.9)	24.5 (76.1)	24.2 (75.6)	24.1 (75.4)	24.3 (75.7)	24.5 (76.1)	24.4 (75.9)	24.4 (75.9)	24.2 (75.6)	24.2 (75.6)
Average rainfall mm (inches)	271.8 (10.70)	231.6 (9.12)	208.3 (8.20)	220.2 (8.67)	304.5 (11.99)	438.7 (17.27)	458.2 (18.04)	379.7 (14.95)	301.2 (11.86)	352.3 (13.87)	287.5 (11.32)	304.3 (11.98)	3,758.3 (147.97)
Average rainy days	19.0	15.9	16.7	14.8	20.0	21.9	21.0	19.8	16.8	20.1	18.7	19.9	224.6
Mean monthly sunshine hours	198.4	194.9	244.9	234.0	210.8	168.0	186.0	176.7	198.0	179.8	183.0	182.9	2,357.4
Source: Hong Kong Observatory

=== Environment ===
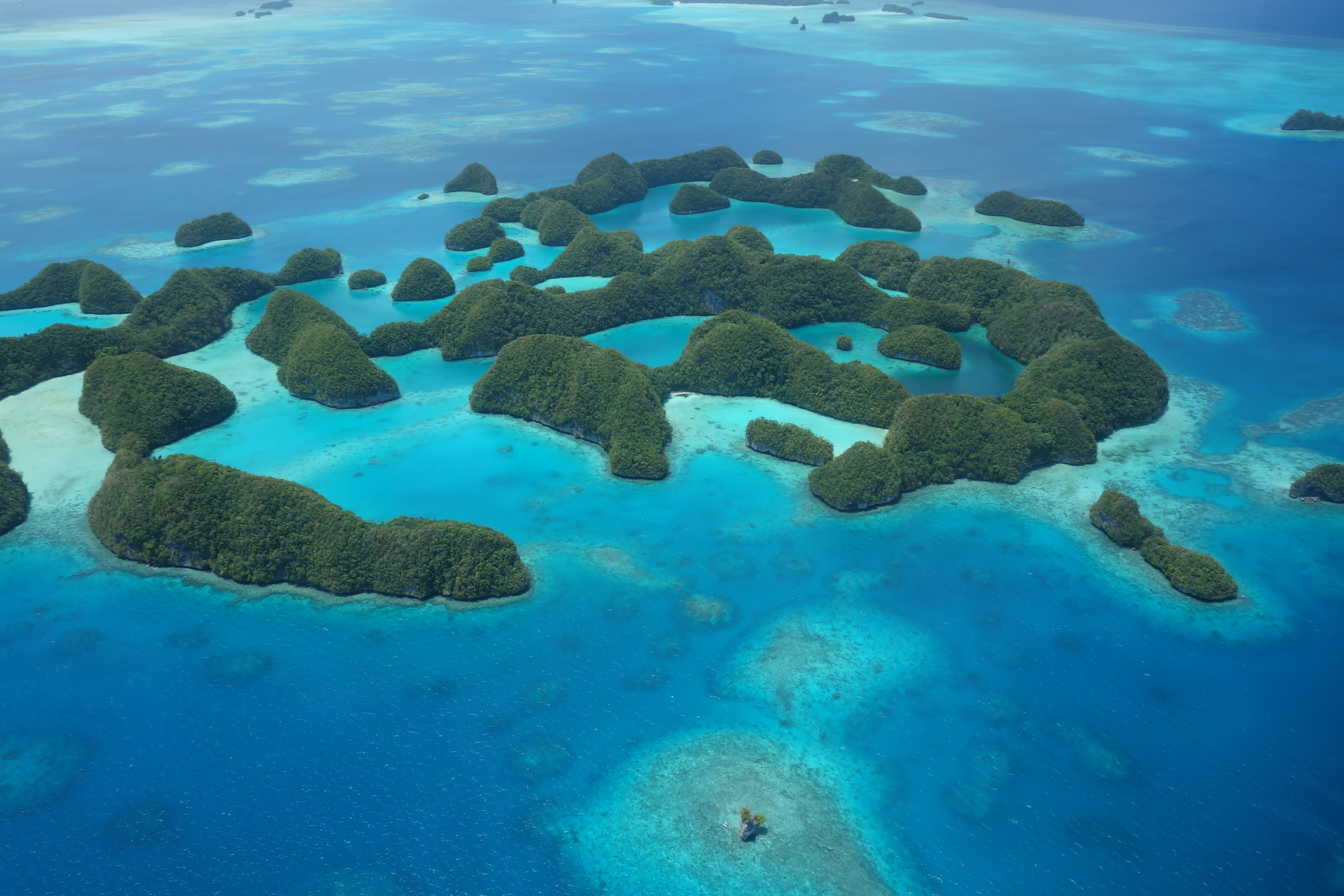
Aerial view of Ngerukewid

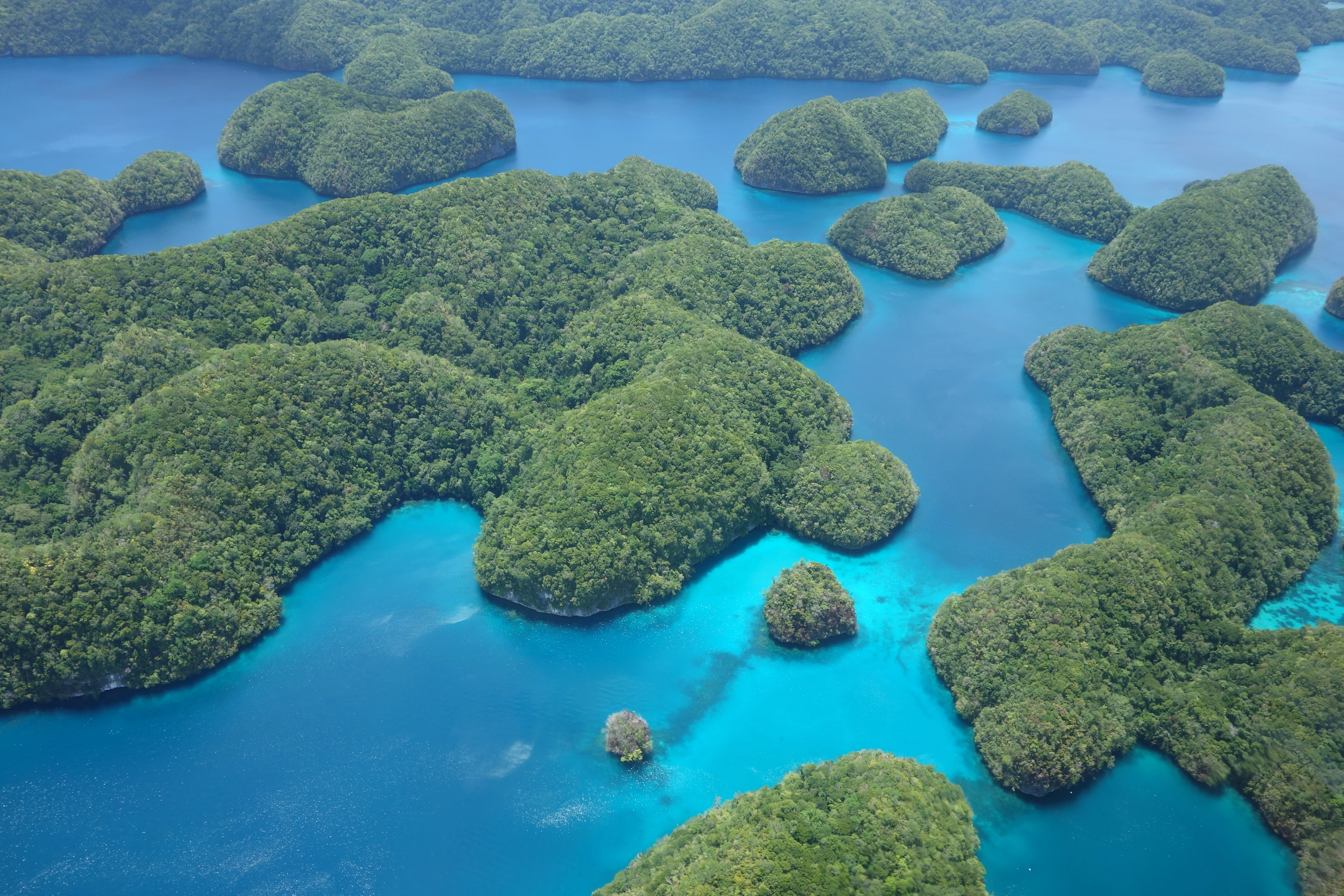
Aerial view of Rock Islands

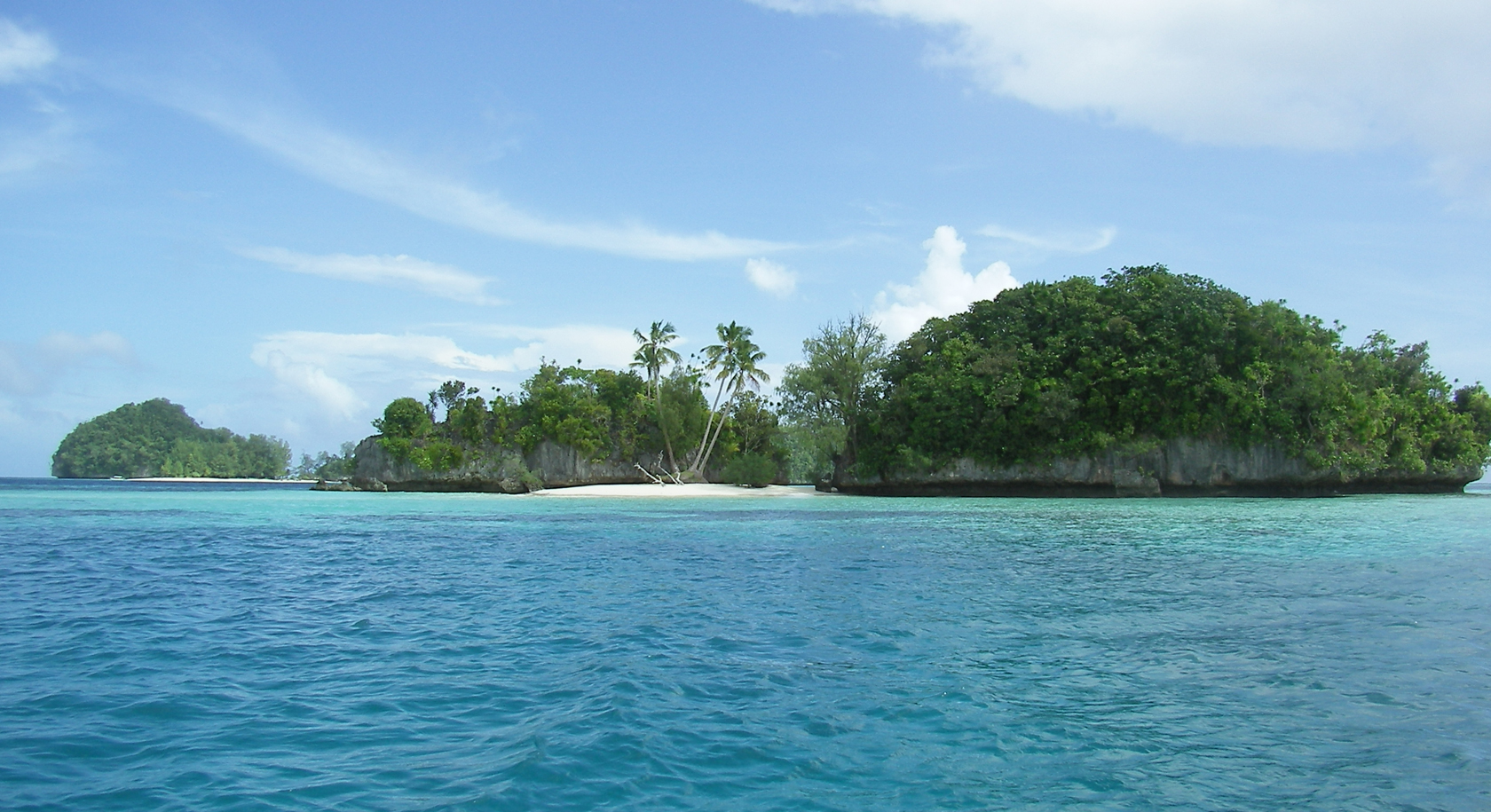
Rock Islands in Palau

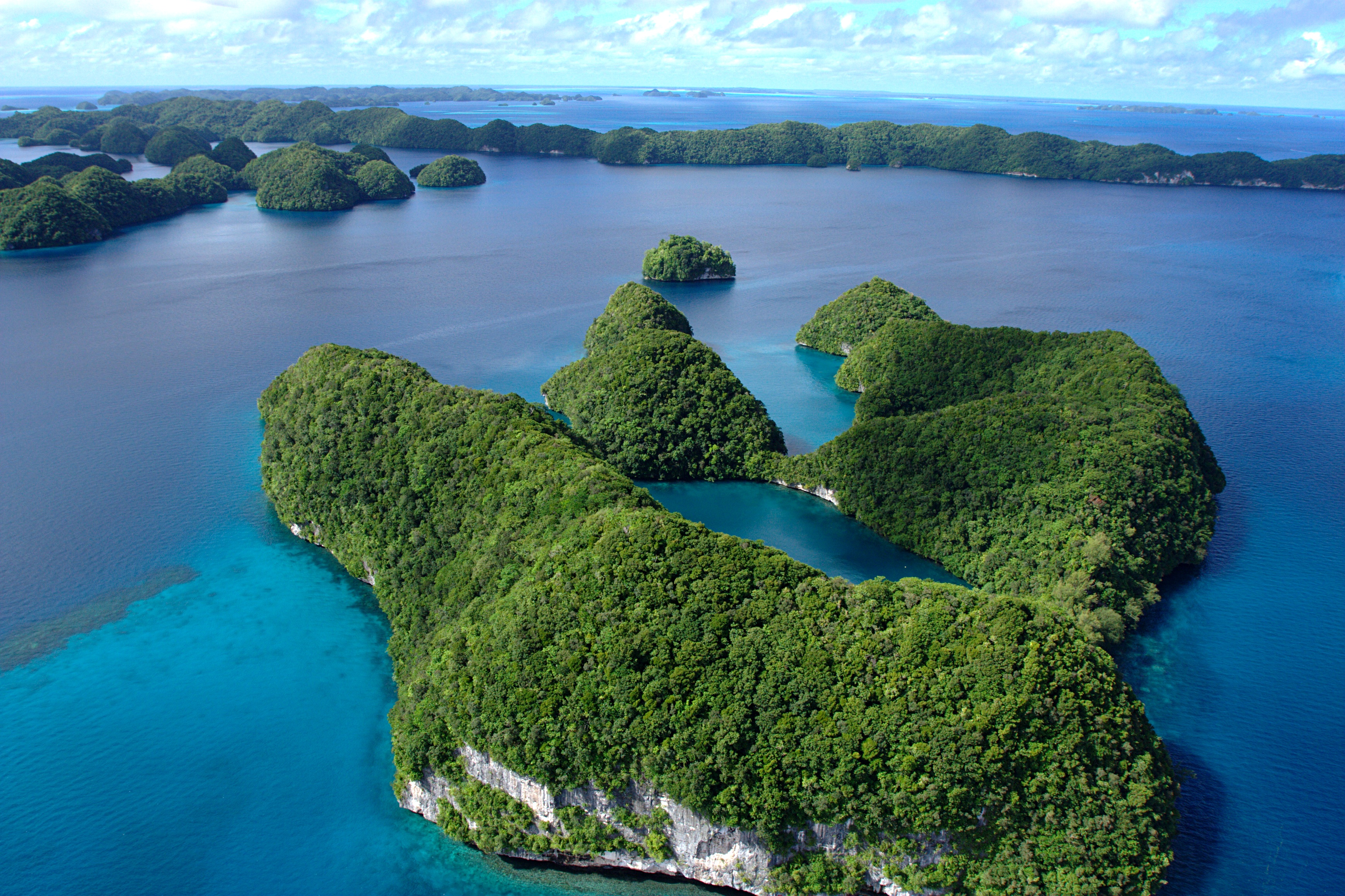
An aerial view of limestone islands

Palau has a history of strong environmental conservation. For example, Ngerukewid and the surrounding area are protected under the Ngerukewid Islands Wildlife Preserve, which was established in 1956. While much of Palau remains free of environmental degradation, areas of concern include illegal dynamite fishing, inadequate solid waste disposal facilities in Koror, and extensive sand and coral dredging in the Palau lagoon.

As with other Pacific island states, rising sea level presents a major environmental threat. However, according to the Emissions Database for Global Atmospheric Research average carbon dioxide emissions per person were 60 tonnes in 2019, the highest in the world, and mostly from transport. Inundation of low-lying areas threatens coastal vegetation, agriculture, and an already insufficient water supply. Wastewater treatment is a problem, along with the handling of toxic waste from fertilizers and biocides.

One species of saltwater crocodile, Crocodylus porosus, is native to Palau, occurring in varying numbers throughout the mangroves and in parts of the Rock Islands. Although this species is generally considered extremely dangerous, there has only been one fatal human attack, on 28 December 1965, in Palau in modern history. This attack led to a crocodile eradication program and trade in crocodile hides that ran into the 1980s. A management and conservation program running since the 1990s has led to a stabilization of the Palauan crocodile population.

On 5 November 2005, President Tommy E. Remengesau Jr. took the lead on a regional environmental initiative called the Micronesia Challenge, which would conserve 30% of near-shore coastal waters and 20% of forest land by 2020. Following Palau, the initiative was joined by the Federated States of Micronesia, the Marshall Islands, and the US territories of Guam and Northern Mariana Islands. Together, this combined region represents nearly 5% of the marine area of the Pacific Ocean and 7% of its coastline.

Palau contains the Palau tropical moist forests terrestrial ecoregion. It had a 2019 Forest Landscape Integrity Index mean score of 8.09/10, ranking it 27th globally out of 172 countries. The country is vulnerable to earthquakes, volcanic activity, and tropical storms.

=== Shark sanctuary ===
On 25 September 2009, Palau announced that it would create the world's first shark sanctuary. Palau banned all commercial shark fishing within the waters of its exclusive economic zone. The sanctuary protects about 600,000 square kilometers (230,000 sq mi) of ocean, a similar size to France. President Johnson Toribiong announced the sanctuary at a meeting of the United Nations. Toribiong proposed a worldwide ban on fishing for sharks. In 2012, Palau received the Future Policy Award from World Future Council, because "Palau is a global leader in protecting marine ecosystems".

== Economy ==
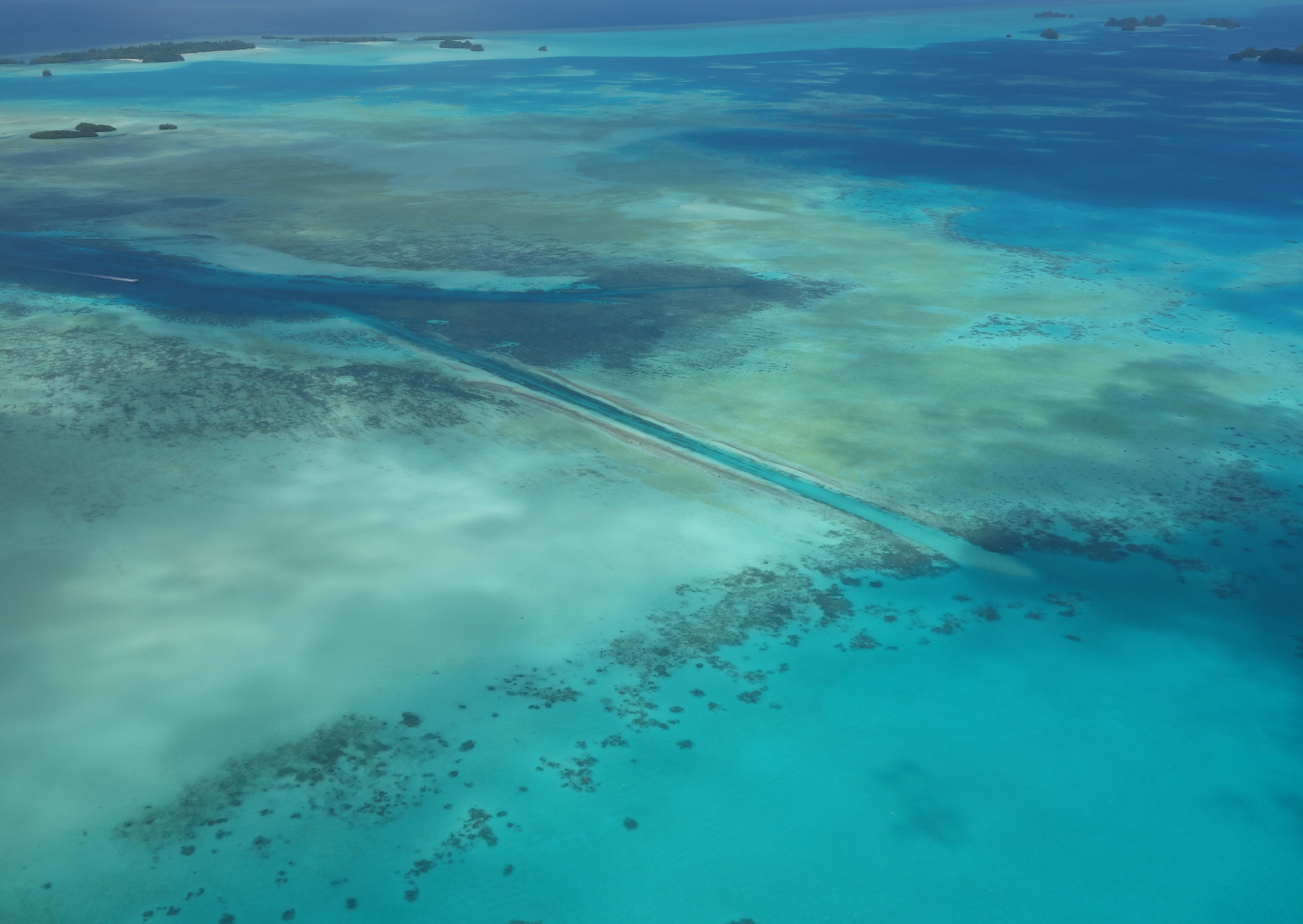
The artificially made German Channel is one of the most popular dive sites. It is also a major transport route for boats that connects the lagoon to the Pacific Ocean in the south-west.

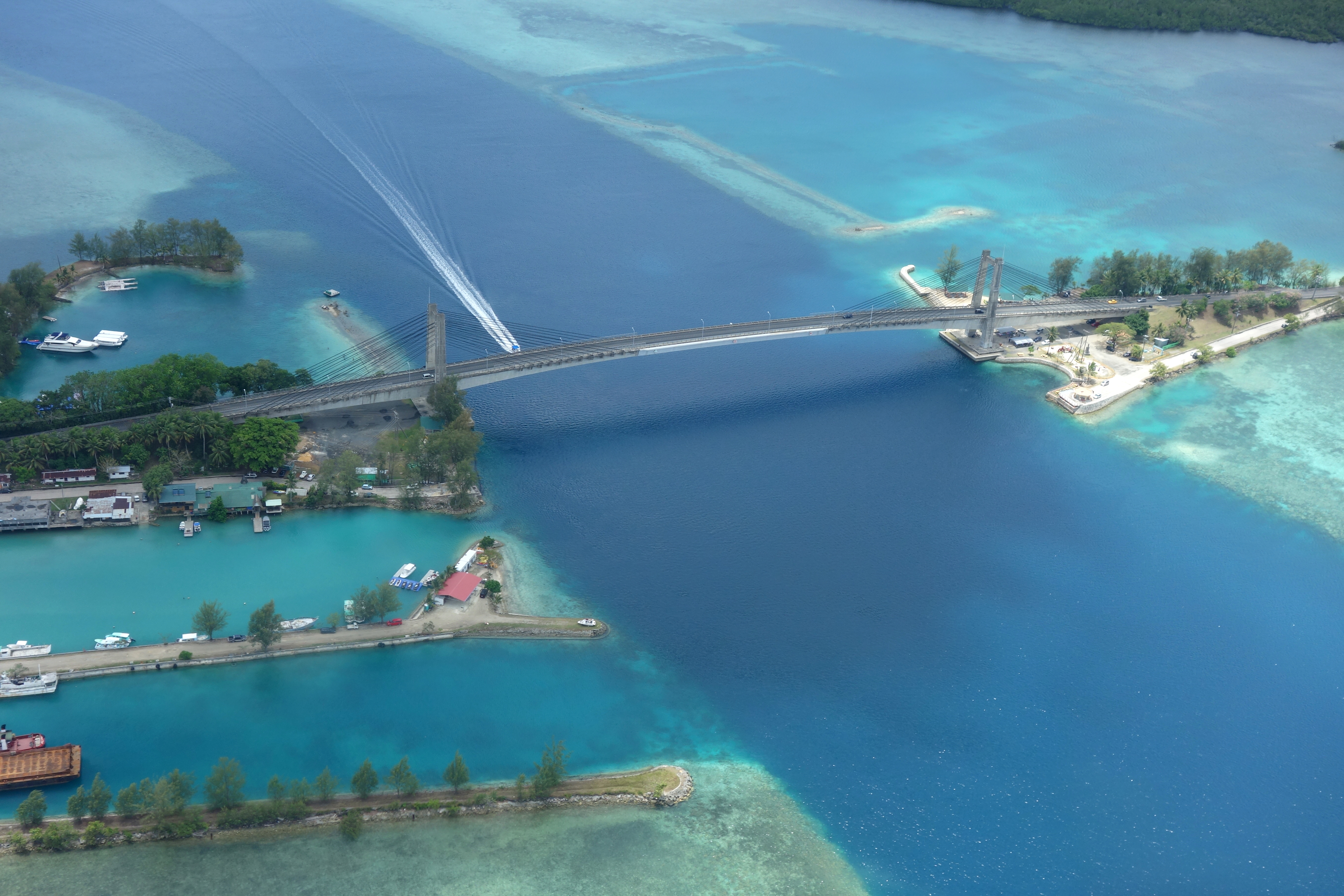
Aerial view of Koror–Babeldaob Bridge in 2016

Palau's economy consists primarily of tourism, subsistence agriculture, and fishing. Tourist activity focuses on scuba diving and snorkeling in the islands' rich marine environment, including its barrier reefs' walls and World War II wrecks. In April 2022, Palau launched Ol'au Palau, a responsible tourism program aimed to preserve the country's natural environment and traditional culture. The government is the largest employer, relying heavily on US financial assistance. Business and tourist arrivals numbered 65,558 in fiscal year 2025.

Although Palau's ship registry represents less than 0.001% of the world fleet of commercial ships, it contains almost 60% of last-voyage flags in 2019. It suggests that the registry is used by shipping companies to evade end-of-life responsibilities. These responsibilities entail the decommissioning of a ship in such a way that the environmental impact and labor conditions are in order.

The population enjoys a per capita income twice that of Micronesia as a whole. Long-term prospects for the key tourist sector have been greatly bolstered by the expansion of air travel in the Pacific Rim, the rising prosperity of leading East Asian countries and the willingness of foreigners to finance infrastructure development.

In November 2006, Pacific Savings Bank officially announced bankruptcy. On 13 December 2006, the Palau Horizon reported that 641 depositors had been affected. Among them, 398 held less than US$5,000, with the remainder ranging from US$5,000 to US$2 million. On 12 December, 79 affected people received compensation. Toribiong said, "The fund for the payout came from the balance of the Palau government's loan from Taiwan." From a total of US$1 million, which originally was for assisting Palau's development, US$955,000 was left at the time of bankruptcy. Toribiong requested the Taiwanese government use the balance to repay its loans. Taiwan agreed to the request. The compensation would include those who held less than US$4,000 in an account.

The income tax has three brackets with progressive rates of 9.3 percent, 15 percent, and 19.6 percent respectively. Corporate tax is four percent, and the Palau Goods and Services Tax was introduced on 1 January 2023. It is a broad-based tax of 10%, applied to most goods and services and other items sold or consumed in Palau. There are no property taxes.

Major tourist draws in Palau include Rock Islands Southern Lagoon, a UNESCO World Heritage Site, and four tentative UNESCO sites, namely, Ouballang ra Ngebedech (Ngebedech Terraces), Imeong Conservation Area, Yapease Quarry Sites, and Tet el Bad (Stone Coffin).

== Healthcare ==
Palau is served by an 80-bed hospital, Belau National Hospital. With some medical specialties, there is no such specialty care in Palau, necessitating medical care in Taiwan, the Philippines, or Hawaii. There are no dermatologists or ophthalmologists in Palau. VEGF drugs for diabetic eye diseases cannot be given for eye conditions so laser surgery is done by visiting American ophthalmologists. Belau National Hospital cannot treat certain brain hemorrhages necessitating emergency airlift to Taiwan.

== Transportation ==
Palau International Airport

Palau International Airport provides scheduled direct flights with Guam (Antonio B. Won Pat International Airport), Manila (Ninoy Aquino International Airport), Brisbane (Brisbane Airport) and Taipei (Taoyuan International Airport). In addition, the states of Angaur and Peleliu have regular service to domestic destinations. Air service has at times been spotty. Palau Micronesia Air, Asian Spirit and Pacific Flier provided service to the Philippines and other destinations at various times during the 2000s, but all suspended service. United Airlines provides near-daily service to and from Guam, and once-weekly service to Yap. Korean Air also runs a direct service three times per week to Incheon. Two to four times per week, China Airlines flies between Koror and Taipei.

In May 2024, Nauru Airlines started direct weekly flights to Brisbane, Australia. This service was taken over by Qantas in December 2024 operating the “Palau Paradise Express” once a week from Brisbane with a Boeing 737-800. The route aims to enhance connectivity in the Pacific and boost tourism, trade, and people-to-people links, with support from the Australian and Palau governments.

Freight, military, and cruise ships often call at Malaehaka Harbor, on Malakal Island outside Koror. The country has no railways, and of the 61 km or 38 mi of highways, only 36 km or 22 mi are paved. Driving is on the right, and the speed limit is 40 km/h (25 mph). Taxis are available in Koror. They are not metered, and fares are negotiable. Transportation between islands mostly relies on private boats and domestic air services. However, there are some state-run boats between islands as a cheaper alternative.

== Demographics ==
Historical population
Year	Pop.	±%
1958	8,987	—
1970	11,210	+24.7%
1980	12,116	+8.1%
1990	15,122	+24.8%
1995	17,225	+13.9%
2000	19,129	+11.1%
2005	19,907	+4.1%
2015	17,661	−11.3%
2020	17,614	−0.3%
Source: "Island Areas". U.S. Census Bureau.; "Census of Population and Housing". PalauGov.pw.

The population of Palau is approximately 21,947 (2025), 73% of whom are native Palauans of mixed Melanesian and Austronesian descent. There are many Asian communities within Palau. Filipinos form the largest Asian group and second largest ethnic group in the country, dating back to the Spanish colonial period. There are significant numbers of Chinese and Koreans. There are also smaller numbers of Palauans of mixed or full Japanese ancestry. Most Palauans of Asian origin came during the late 20th century with many Chinese, Bangladeshis, and Nepalese coming to Palau as unskilled workers and professionals. There are also small numbers of Europeans and Americans.

=== Languages ===
The official languages of Palau are Palauan and English. The indigenous languages (which are Sonsorolese and Tobian) are recognized as national languages. Because of the inheritance of the education system from the Republic's time as a trust territory, English is a core subject within the Palauan Education System, with a majority of its population utilizing it as a second language. A local dialect influenced by Philippine English is developing.

Sonsorolese and Tobian are official within their respective states, Sonsorol and Hatohobei; the Angaur dialect of Palauan is "the language" of that state. Japanese was made an additional official language of Angaur in the 1982 constitution, when some elders still knew the language, but it is no longer spoken.

=== Religion ===
According to the 2020 census, 46.9% of the population is Roman Catholic, 25.9% Protestant (primarily evangelical), 5% Seventh-day Adventist, 5.1% Modekngei, 4.9% Muslim, 0.9% the Church of Jesus Christ of Latter-day Saints, and 11.4% other religions.

The German and Japanese occupations of Palau both subsidized missionaries to follow the Spanish. Germans sent Roman Catholics and Protestants, the Japanese sent Shinto and Buddhist, and the Spaniards sent Roman Catholic missionaries as they controlled Palau. Three-quarters of the population are Christians (mainly Roman Catholics and Protestants), while Modekngei (a combination of Christianity, traditional Palauan religion and fortune telling) and the ancient Palauan religion are commonly observed. Japanese rule brought Mahayana Buddhism and Shinto to Palau, which was the majority religion among Japanese settlers. However, following Japan's World War II defeat, the remaining Japanese largely converted to Christianity, while some continued to observe Buddhism but stopped practicing Shinto rites. There are approximately 400 Bengali Muslims.

== Culture ==
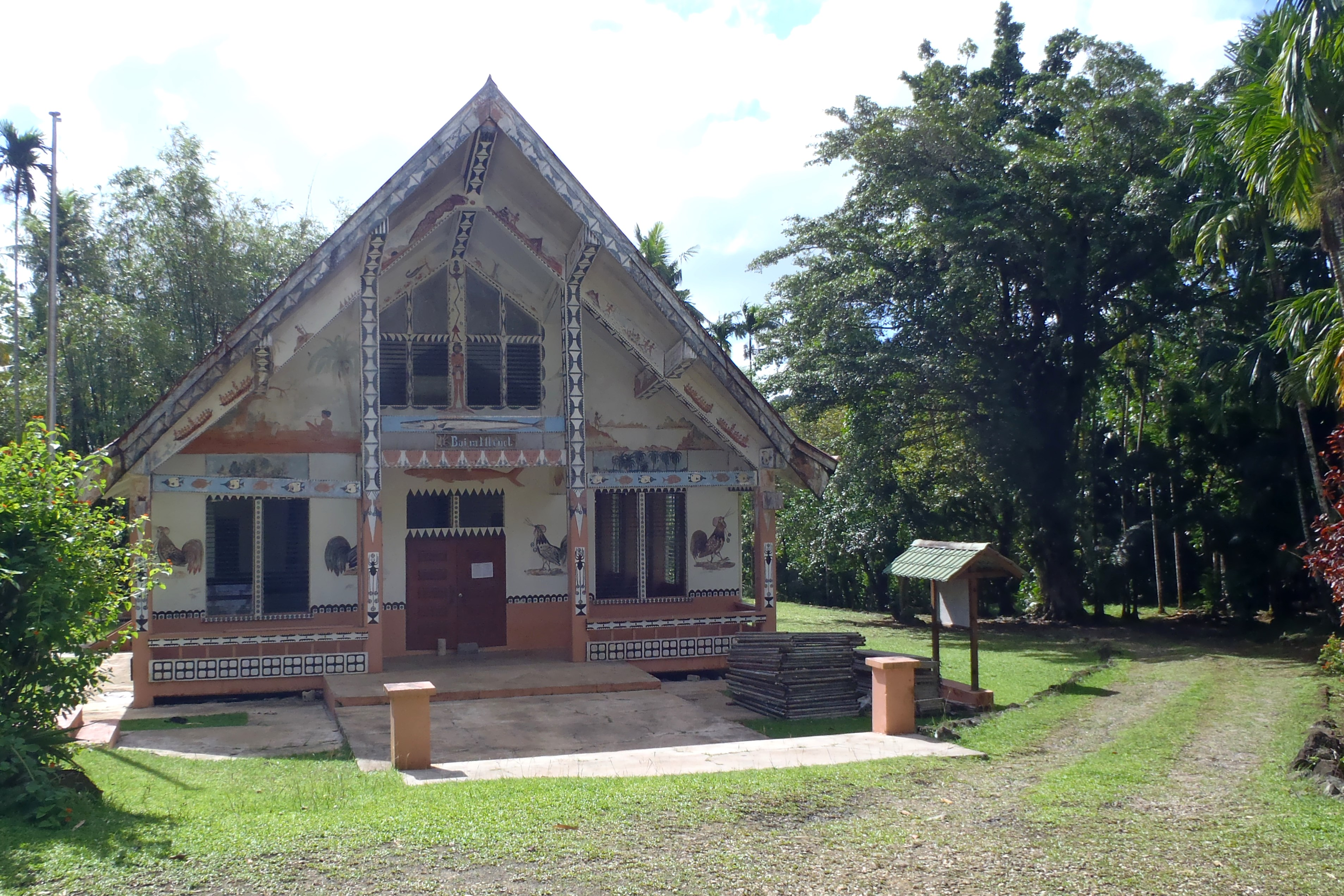
A traditional Palauan bai in 2012

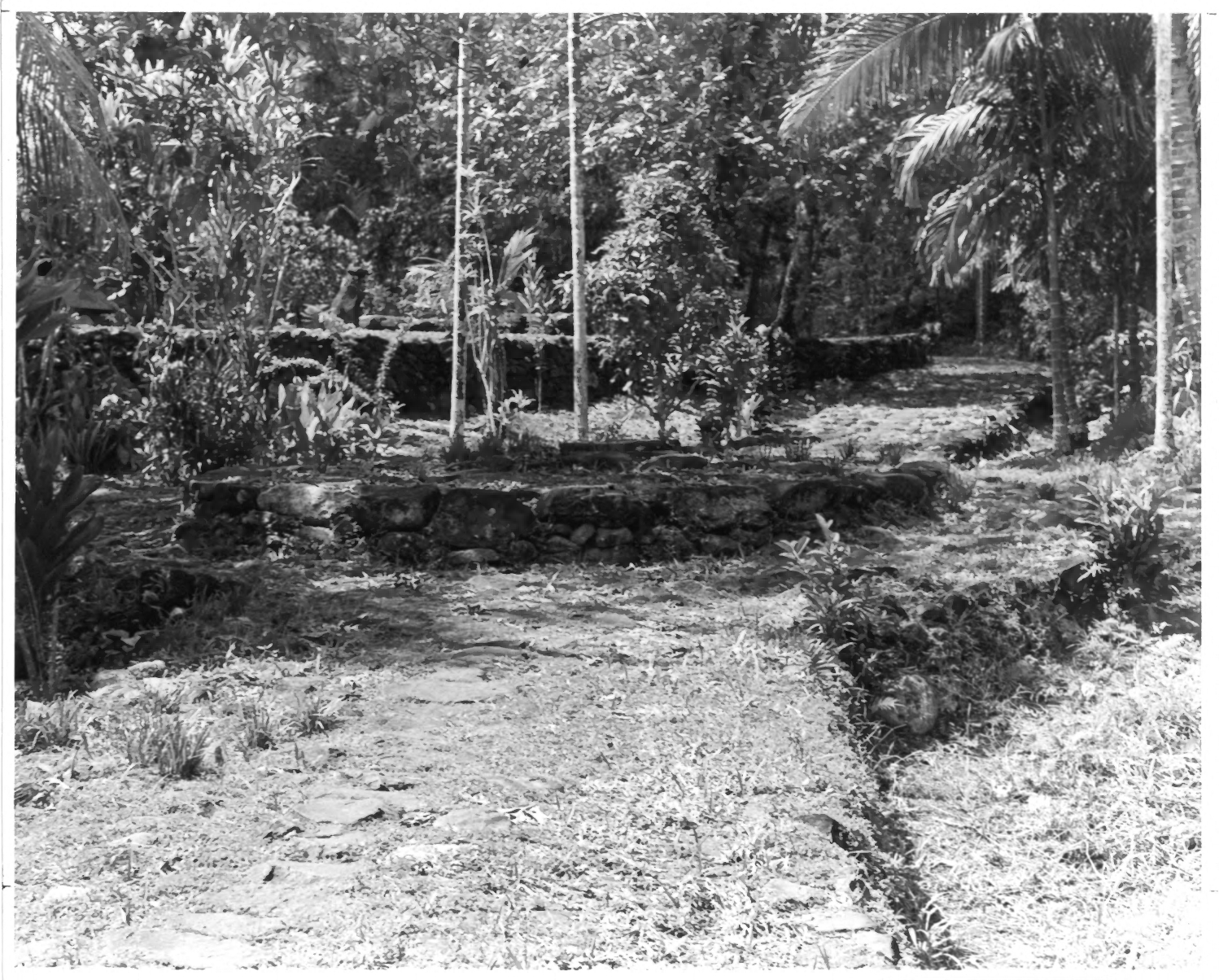
Old stone pathway in Airai

=== Historical buildings ===
In various parts of Palau historical stone buildings can be visited, e.g. monoliths in Ollei, stone paths in Airai and large terraces.

=== Matrilineal System ===
Palauan society follows a very strict matrilineal system. Matrilineal practices are seen in nearly every aspect of Palauan traditions, especially in funerals, marriages, inheritance, and the passing of traditional titles.

=== Cuisine ===
The cuisine includes local foods such as cassava, taro, yam, potato, fish and pork. It is also heavily influenced by Japanese, American, and Filipino cuisine, because of the significant presence of Filipino migrant workers. Fruit bat soup is a Palauan delicacy. Some local drinks include an alcoholic drink made from a coconut on the tree; a drink made from the roots of the kava; and the chewing of betel nuts. A dessert called tama was developed in Palau.

=== Newspapers ===
Palau has several newspapers:

- Rengel Belau (1983–1985)
- Tia Belau (1992–present)
- Island Times

=== Sports ===
Baseball has been popular in Palau since its introduction to the country in the 1920s by the Japanese. The Palau national baseball team won the gold medal at the 1990, 1998 and 2010 Micronesian Games, as well as at the 2007 Pacific Games. On 20 June 2022, left fielder Bligh Madris played his first game for the Pittsburgh Pirates against the Chicago Cubs, thus becoming the first person of Palauan descent to play in the MLB. Palau has a national football team, organized by the Palau Football Association, but is not a member of FIFA. The association organized the Palau Soccer League until the outbreak of COVID-19.

The Belau Omal Marathon began in 2023 as a partnership between Palau and Taiwan.

== Education ==
Primary education is required until age 16. Schools include both public (including Palau High School) and private institutions as well as some fields of study available at Palau Community College. For further undergraduate, graduate, and professional programs, students travel abroad to attend tertiary institutions, primarily in the United States. Palau offers distance learning through San Diego State University and the University of the South Pacific.

== See also ==
- Index of Palau-related articles
- Outline of Palau
