= Sonsorol =

- State
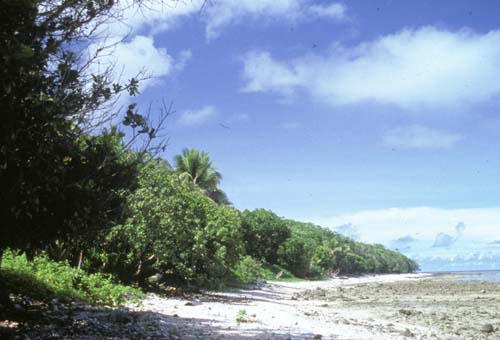
- Merir Island, Sonsorol State

- Flag

- Location of Sonsorol in Palau
- Country: Palau
- Capital: Dongosaru

Government
  - Body: Sonsorol State Legislature
  - Governor: Lucy Pedro

Area
  - Total: 3.12 km^{2} (1.20 sq mi)
  - Land: 3.12 km^{2} (1.20 sq mi)
  - Water: 0 km^{2} (0 sq mi)

Population (2015 Census)
  - Total: 40
  - Density: 13/km^{2} (33/sq mi)
  - Official languages: Palauan; English; Sonsorolese
- ISO 3166 code: PW-370

Sonsorol is one of the sixteen states of Palau. The inhabitants speak Sonsorolese, a local Chuukic language, and Palauan.

The islands of the state of Sonsorol, together with the islands of Hatohobei, form the Southwest Islands of Palau. By area and population it is the country's third smallest state (after Hatohobei and Kayangel.)

== History ==
The first sighting by Europeans of the Sonsorols, was that of Sonsorol and Fanna by the Spanish ship Trinidad then commanded by Gonzalo Gómez de Espinosa on 6 May 1522. These two were collectively charted as the San Juan (St. John) Islands as they were sighted on the day of its festivity. A Spanish missionary expedition commanded by Sargento Mayor Francisco Padilla arrived on Sonsorol on 30 November 1710, coming from Manila aboard the patache Santísima Trinidad. In 1712 they were explored by an expedition commanded by Spanish naval officer Bernardo de Egoy.

In 1899 Spain decided to sell the islands to the German Empire, which lost control over the territory in World War I, when Japan took over. The United States took possession of the area at the end of World War II and controlled it until Palau's independence.

During December 2012, the state suffered severely from Typhoon Bopha and people were evacuated to Arakabesang in Koror. There were 37 people from Sonsorol, 19 from Pulo Anna, and two from Merir. A couple of months later, and due to a government decision, only Sonsorol was re-inhabited, as it cheaper and closer to get to and send supplies to. Forty-two people returned to the island, and it is the only inhabited island in the state as of 2014.

== Geography ==
The administrative center, and only village, is Dongosaru on Sonsorol island. The state has a total area of 312 hectares (771 acres) distributed among several islands.

=== Islands ===
The state is subdivided into four municipalities, which correspond to the four individual islands that previously were inhabited. The islands are, from north to south (Fanna Island and Sonsorol Island are together called Sonsorol Islands):

No.	Municipality (Island)	Village (or Former)	Area	Population census 2015	Coordinates
1	Fanna	-	0.48 km^{2} (0.19 sq mi)	0	05°21′09″N 132°13′32″E
2	Sonsorol	Dongosaru	1.31 km^{2} (0.51 sq mi)	40	05°19′28″N 132°13′16″E
3	Pulo Anna		0.42 km^{2} (0.16 sq mi)	0	04°39′34″N 131°57′49″E
4	Merir		0.91 km^{2} (0.35 sq mi)	0	04°19′27″N 132°18′37″E
	State of Sonsorol	Dongosaru	3.12 km^{2} (1.20 sq mi)	40	

==== Fanna ====
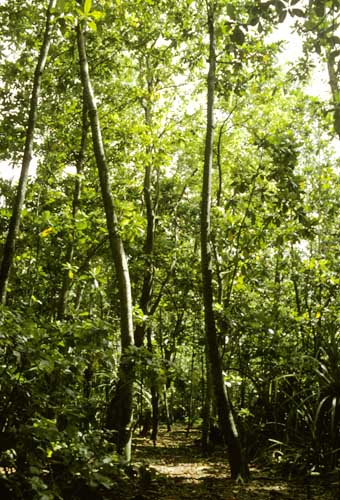
Fanna Island

Fanna, also called Fana, is encircled by a coral reef extending 160 to 480 metres (520 to 1,570 ft) offshore, and nearly circular in shape, with a diameter of 350 metres (1,150 ft). The island is thickly wooded with coconut palms and other trees. The island is referenced as a municipality. Mariano Carlos served as chief from 2000 until the Typhoon Bopha evacuation. Fanna Island and nearby Sonsorol Island, located 1.6 kilometres (0.99 mi; 0.86 nmi) to the south, together form the Sonsorol Islands.

==== Sonsorol ====
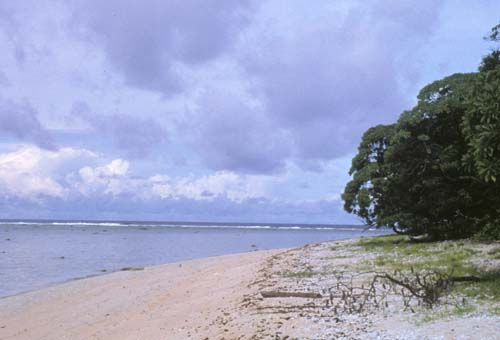
Sonsorol Island

Sonsorol Island, also called Dongosaro or Dongosaru, is encircled by a coral reef extending 160 to 480 metres (520 to 1,570 ft) offshore. It is 2 kilometres (1.2 mi) long north-to-south, and up to 890 metres (2,920 ft) wide in the north. It is located 1.6 kilometres (0.99 mi; 0.86 nmi) south of Fanna Island. The village of Dongosaro, which is the capital of the state, is located on the west coast. The island is thickly wooded with coconut palms and other trees. Together with Fanna, it forms the Sonsorol Islands.

Sonsorol was probably the first of Palau Islands visited by a European - the Jesuit expedition of Francisco Padilla on 30 November 1710. A year after Typhoon Bopha, the Palau government issued a reconstruction plan for the island, and also built a small dock there.

==== Pulo Anna ====
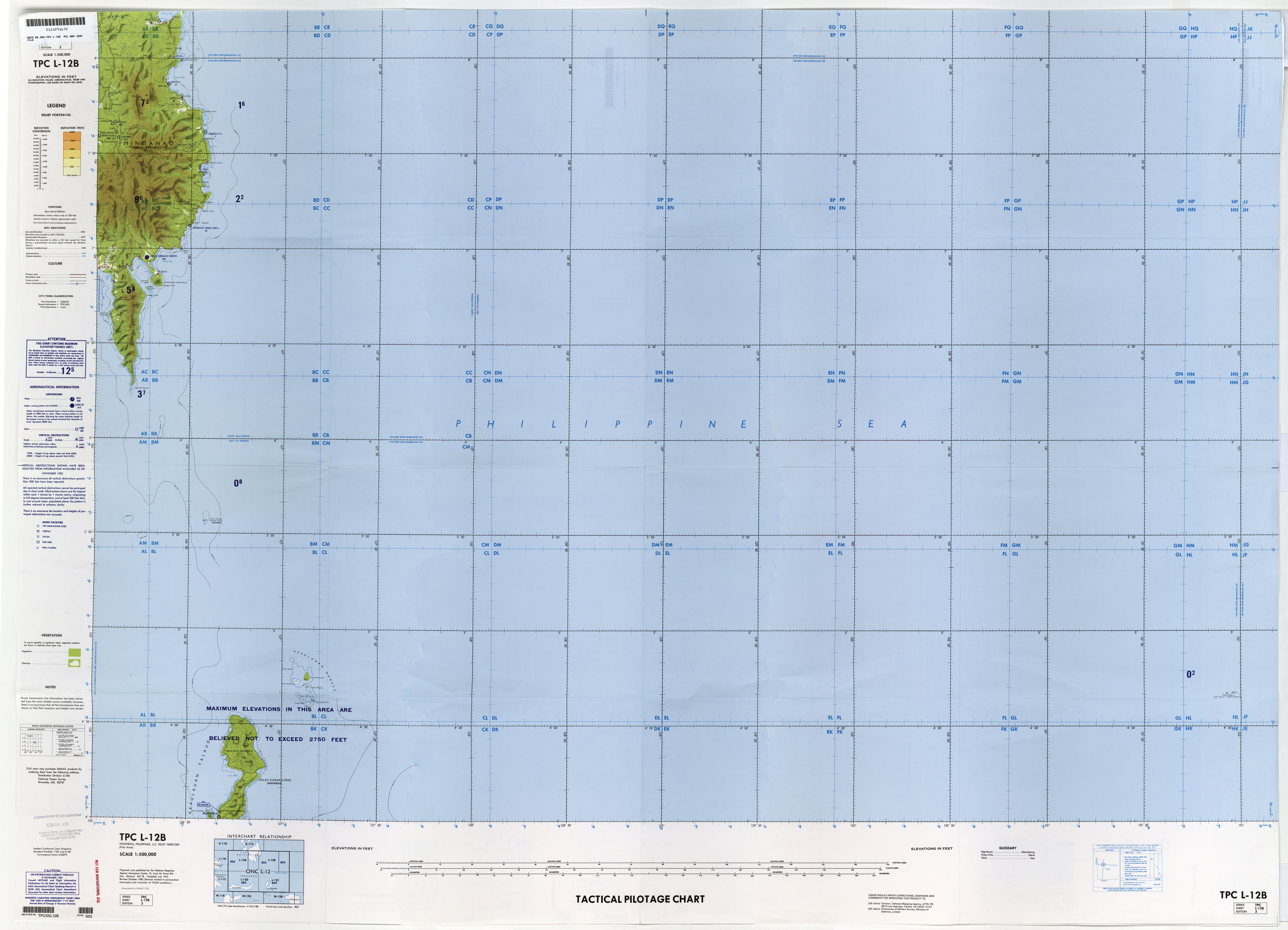
Map including Pulo Anna (DMA, 1982)

Pulo Anna or Puro is fringed by a coral reef extending beyond 460 metres (1,510 ft) offshore. The island itself is about elliptical and measures 800 metres (2,600 ft) northeast-southwest, and is up to 550 metres (1,800 ft) wide. A village named Puro was once on the northwest side of the island. Pulo Anna lies in the flow of the Equatorial Countercurrent throughout the year.

=== Merir ===
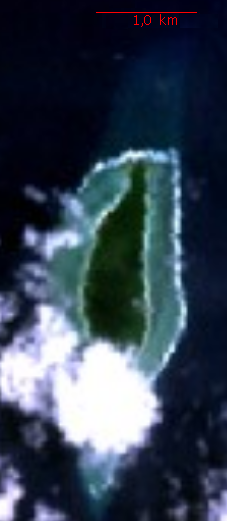
Satellite view of the Island of Merir

Merir Island, or Melieli, is fringed by reef which extends beyond 1,100 metres (3,600 ft) offshore in the south and 160 metres (520 ft) in the north. The edges of the reef are steep-to, except at the northern end where a spit, with a depth of 12.8 metres (42 ft) at its outer end, extends about 1,300 metres (4,300 ft) northward. The island itself is 2.2 kilometres (1.4 mi) long north-to-south, and up to 600 metres (2,000 ft) wide. A village named Melieli, which had a radio station, was located on the northwest side of the island.

== Demography ==
The population of the state was 40 in the 2015 census and the median age was 30.0 years. The official languages of the state are Palauan, English, and Sonsorolese. Nurap is the title of the traditional high chief from the state.

In June 1972, the resident population was 123, including 17 in Pulo Anna.

== Political system ==
Sonsorol has its own constitution, adopted in 1983. The state government was established in 1984. The state of Sonsorol, with population of less than 50, has an elected chief executive, governor. The state also has a legislature elected every four years. The state population elects one of the members of the House of Delegates of Palau.

Governors of Sonsorol from 1984 to 2004:

- Flavian Carlos, 1984–1992
- Kurterbis Kurtermalei, 1992–2000
- Laura I. Ierago, 2000–2004

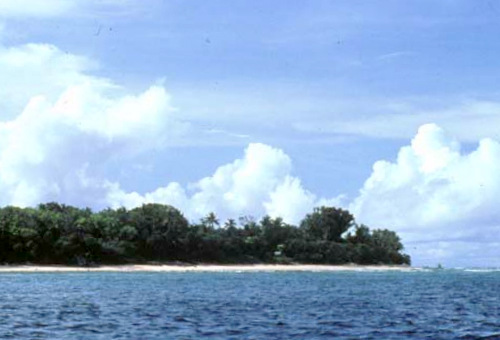
Pulo Anna Shoreline

== Education ==
The Ministry of Education operates two public schools in the state:

- Pulo Anna Elementary School - Built in 1972, it has one classroom and one teacher, with facilities for its students (five, as of September 2018) to stay on the otherwise deserted island
- Sonsorol Elementary School - Established in 1972, it has one classroom and one teacher, to serve the students (thirteen, as of September 2018) who already live on the island

In 1962, the country opened its only public high school, Palau High School in Koror City, which is 300 kilometres (190 mi) across the water from Sonsorol; children from Sonsorol state make arrangements to live in Koror City if they choose to continue their grade school education.
