= Outline of Palau =

Island country in the western Pacific Ocean

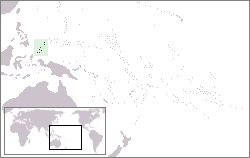
The location of Palau

The Flag of Palau

The Seal of Palau

The following outline is provided as an overview of and topical guide to Palau:

Palau – island country and a United States Associated State located in the western Pacific Ocean. It is geographically part of the larger island group of Micronesia. The country's population of around 21,000 is spread across 250 islands forming the western chain of the Caroline Islands. The most populous island is Koror. The capital Ngerulmud is located in Melekeok State on the nearby island of Babeldaob. The islands share maritime boundaries with Indonesia, the Philippines, and the Federated States of Micronesia.

== General reference ==
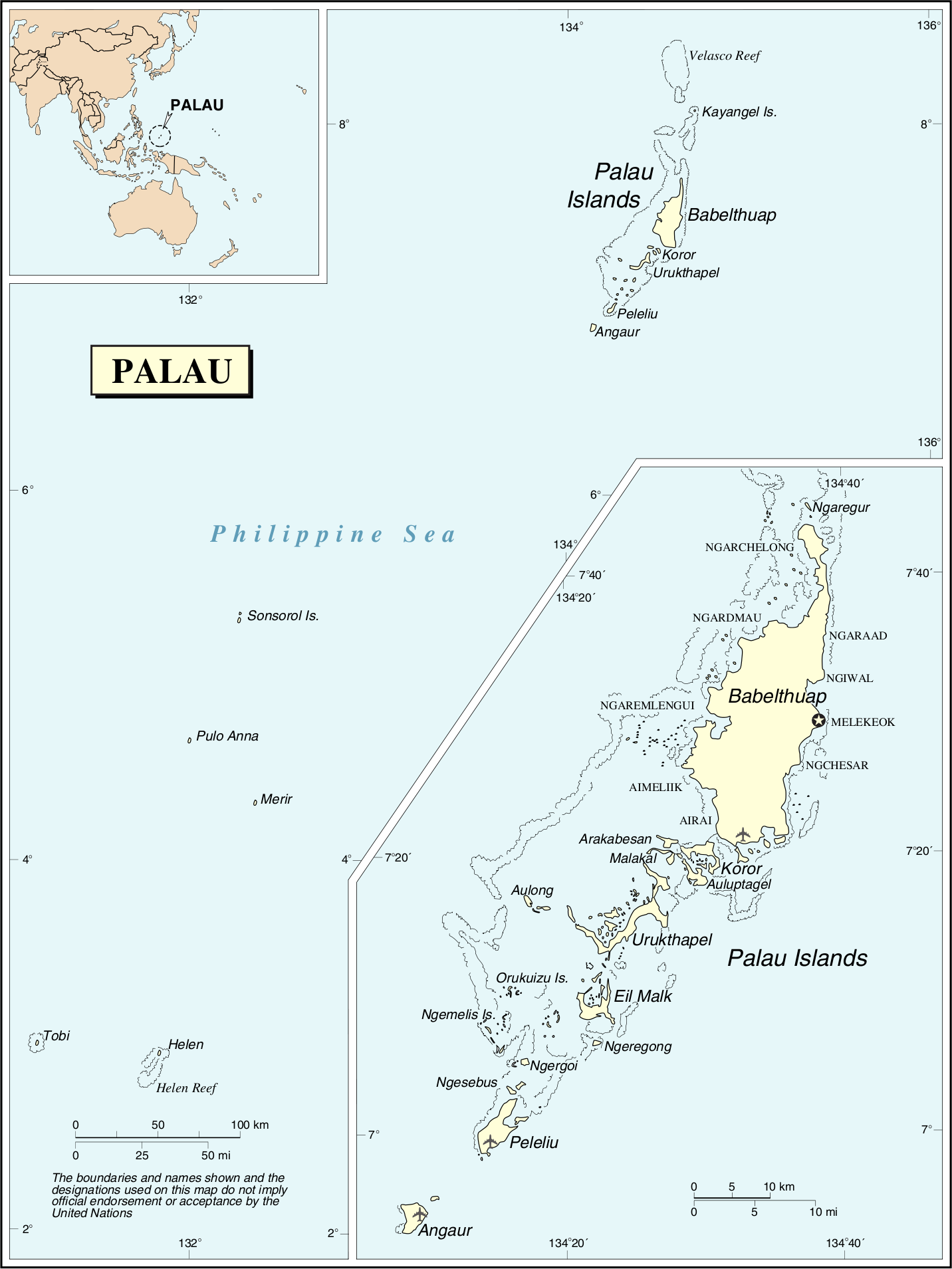
An enlargeable map of the Republic of Palau

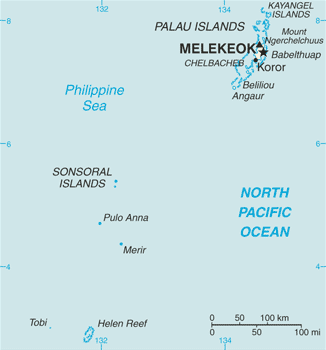
An enlargeable basic map of Palau

- Pronunciation:
- Common English country name: Palau
- Official English country name: The Republic of Palau
- Common endonym(s): Belau
- Official endonym(s):
- Adjectival(s): Palauan
- Demonym(s):
- ISO country codes: PW, PLW, 585
- ISO region codes: See ISO 3166-2:PW
- Internet country code top-level domain: .pw

== Geography of Palau ==
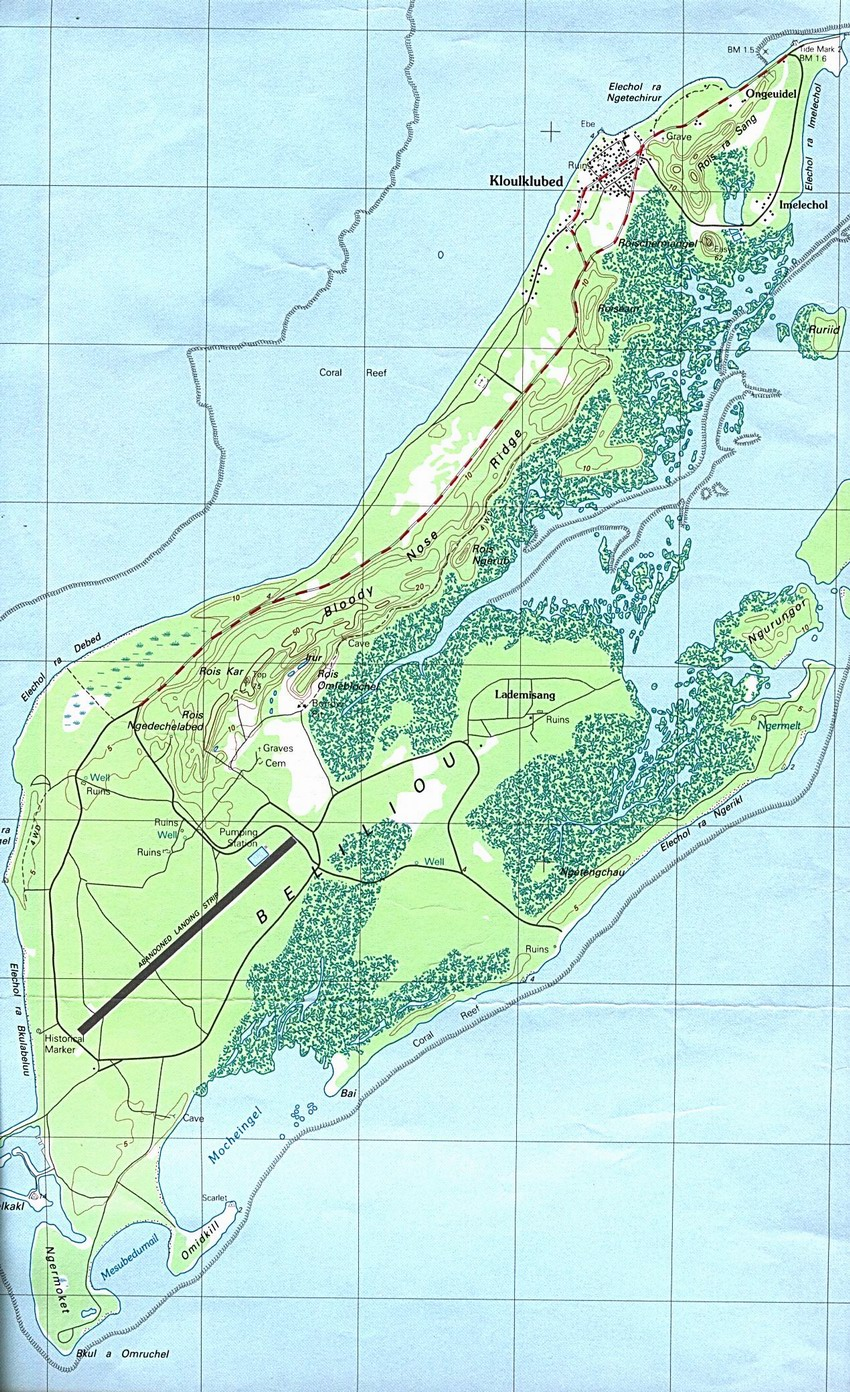
An enlargeable topographic map of the island of Peleliu

Geography of Palau

- Palau is: an island country
- Location:
  - Northern Hemisphere and Eastern Hemisphere
  - Pacific Ocean
    - North Pacific Ocean
      - Oceania
        - Micronesia
  - Time zone: UTC+09
  - Extreme points of Palau
    - High: Mount Ngerchelchuus on Babeldaob 242 m (794 ft)
    - Low: North Pacific Ocean 0 m
  - Land boundaries: none
  - Coastline: North Pacific Ocean 1,519 km
- Population of Palau: 20,000 - 211th most populous country
- Area of Palau: 459 km^{2}
- Atlas of Palau

=== Environment of Palau ===
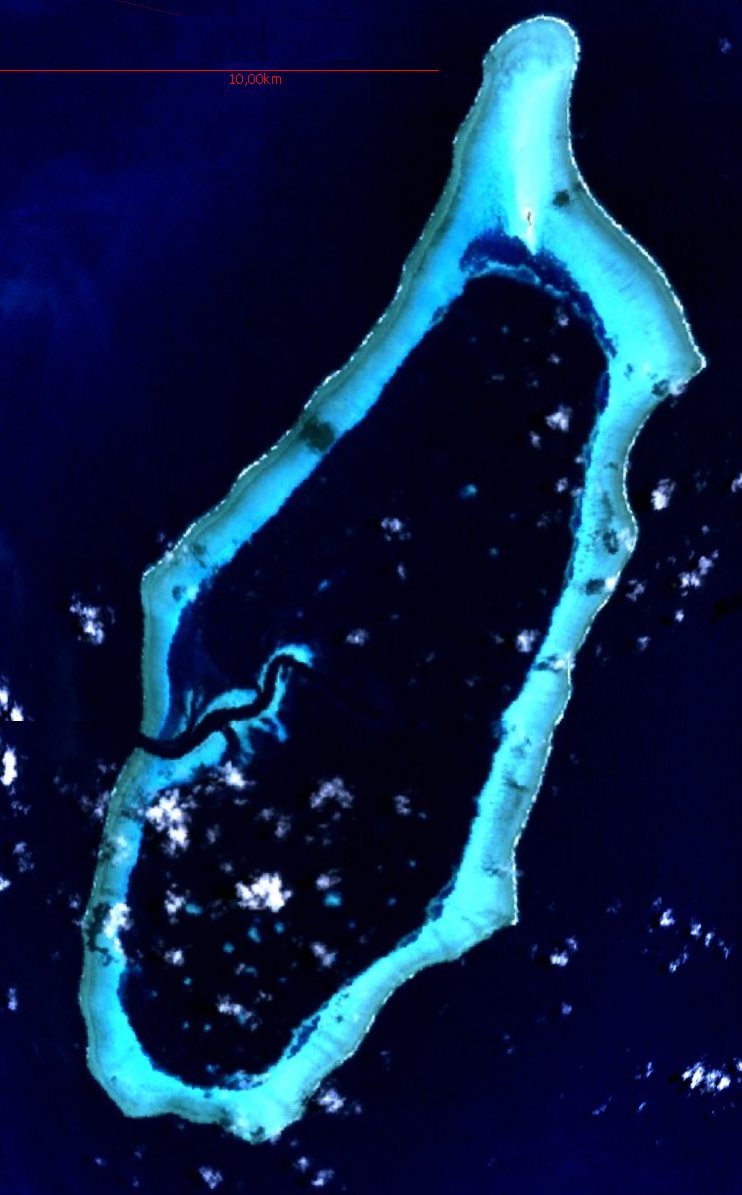
An enlargeable satellite image of Helen Reef in Palau

Environment of Palau

- Climate of Palau
- Wildlife of Palau
  - Birds of Palau
  - Mammals of Palau

==== Natural geographic features of Palau ====
- Islands of Palau
- Lakes of Palau
- Rivers of Palau
- World Heritage Sites in Palau: None

=== Regions of Palau ===
==== Administrative divisions of Palau ====
Administrative divisions of Palau

- States of Palau

===== States of Palau =====
States of Palau

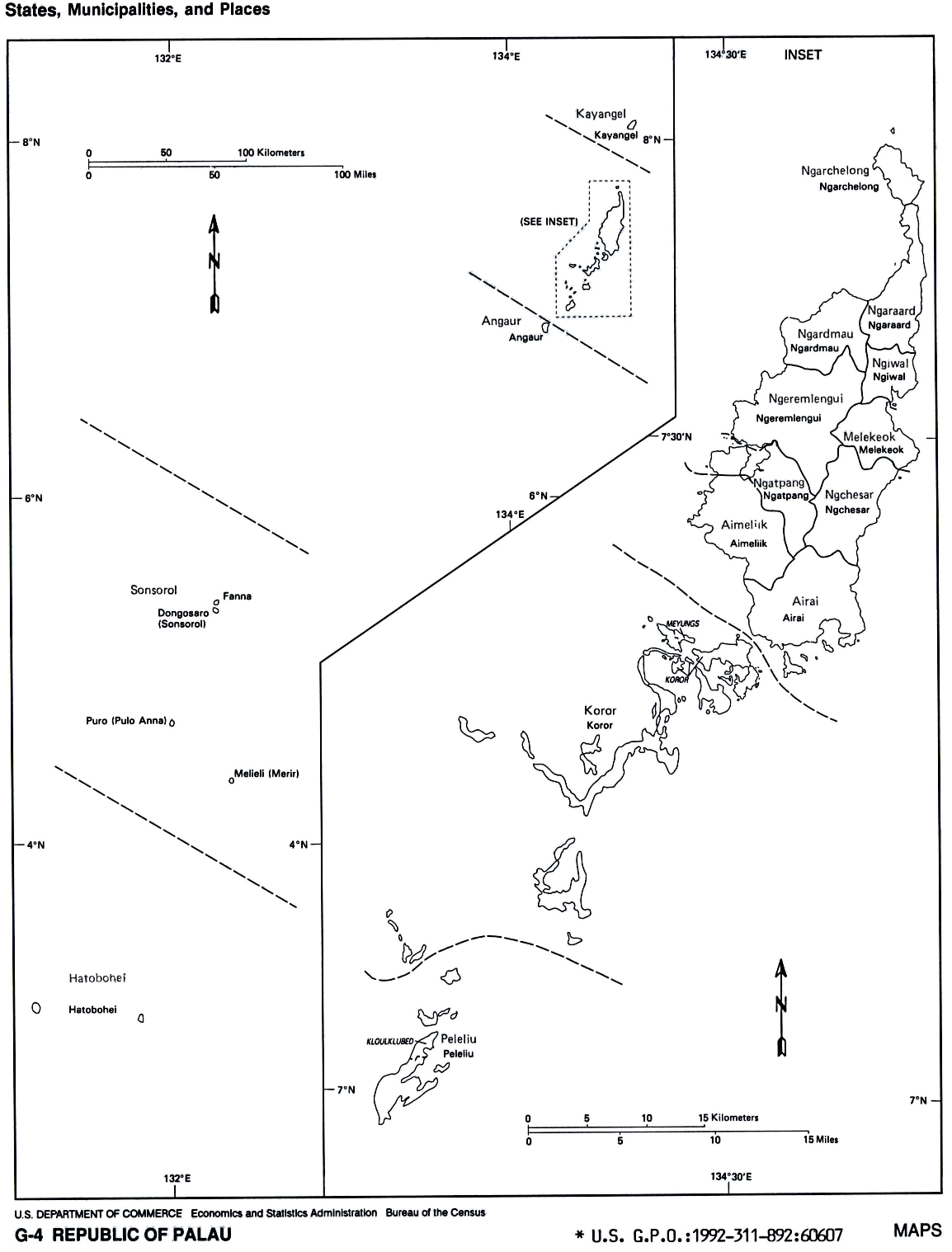
16 states of Palau

State	Capital	Area (km^{2})	Population (Census 2000)
North of Babeldaob
Kayangel	Kayangel	1	138
Babeldaob
Aimeliik	Mongami	52	272
Airai	Ngetkib	44	2 104
Melekeok	Melekeok	28	239
Ngaraard	Ulimang	36	638
Ngarchelong	Mengellang	10	286
Ngardmau	Urdmang	47	221
Ngaremlengui	Imeong	65	367
Ngatpang	Ngereklmadel	47	280
Ngchesar	Ngersuul	41	267
Ngiwal	Ngerkeai	26	193
Southwest of Babeldaob
Angaur	Ngeremasch	8	188
Koror	Koror	18	13 303
Peleliu	Kloulklubed	13	571
Rock Islands, (also called Chelbacheb)	-	47	-
Southwest Islands
Hatohobei	Hatohobei	1	23
Sonsorol	Dongosaru	3	39
Palau	Ngerulmud^{1}	444	19 129
^{1} The national capital of Palau was moved from Koror to Ngerulmud on October 7, 2006.

===== Municipalities of Palau =====
- Capital of Palau: Ngerulmud
- Cities of Palau

=== Demography of Palau ===
Demographics of Palau

== Government and politics of Palau ==
Politics of Palau

- Form of government:
- Capital of Palau: Ngerulmud
- Elections in Palau
- Political parties in Palau

=== Branches of the government of Palau ===
Government of Palau

- Executive Branch, consisting of one Head of Government
- Legislative Branch
  - Upper House:Senate
  - Lower House:House of Delegates

==== Executive branch of the government of Palau ====
- Head of state and head of government: President of Palau, Surangel Whipps Jr.

==== Legislative branch of the government of Palau ====
- Parliament of Palau - Olbiil Era Kelulau (bicameral)
  - Upper house: Senate of Palau
  - Lower house: House of Delegates

==== Judicial branch of the government of Palau ====
Court system of Palau

- Supreme Court of Palau
- National Court
- Court of Common Pleas
- Land Court

=== Foreign relations of Palau ===
Foreign relations of Palau

- Diplomatic missions in Palau
- Diplomatic missions of Palau
- United States-Palau relations

==== International organization membership ====
The Republic of Palau is a member of:

- African, Caribbean, and Pacific Group of States (ACP)
- Asian Development Bank (ADB)
- Food and Agriculture Organization (FAO)
- International Atomic Energy Agency (IAEA)
- International Bank for Reconstruction and Development (IBRD)
- International Civil Aviation Organization (ICAO)
- International Development Association (IDA)
- International Federation of Red Cross and Red Crescent Societies (IFRCS)
- International Finance Corporation (IFC)
- International Monetary Fund (IMF)
- International Olympic Committee (IOC)
- International Red Cross and Red Crescent Movement (ICRM)
- Inter-Parliamentary Union (IPU)
- Multilateral Investment Guarantee Agency (MIGA)
- Organisation for the Prohibition of Chemical Weapons (OPCW)
- Pacific Islands Forum (PIF)
- Secretariat of the Pacific Community (SPC)
- South Pacific Regional Trade and Economic Cooperation Agreement (Sparteca)
- United Nations (UN)
- United Nations Conference on Trade and Development (UNCTAD)
- United Nations Educational, Scientific, and Cultural Organization (UNESCO)
- World Health Organization (WHO)

=== Law and order in Palau ===
- Cannabis in Palau
- Constitution of Palau
- Human rights in Palau
  - LGBT rights in Palau
  - Freedom of religion in Palau
- Law enforcement in Palau

== History of Palau ==
History of Palau

== Culture of Palau ==
Culture of Palau

- Cuisine of Palau
- Festivals in Palau
- Languages of Palau
- Media in Palau
- National symbols of Palau
  - Coat of arms of Palau
  - Flag of Palau
  - National anthem of Palau
- People of Palau
- Public holidays in Palau
- Religion in Palau
  - Christianity in Palau
  - Hinduism in Palau
  - Islam in Palau
  - Judaism in Palau
- World Heritage Sites in Palau: None

=== Art in Palau ===
- Art in Palau
- Cinema of Palau
- Literature of Palau
- Music of Palau
- Television in Palau
- Theatre in Palau

=== Sports in Palau ===
- Football in Palau
- Palau at the Olympics

== Economy and infrastructure of Palau ==
Economy of Palau

- Economic rank, by nominal GDP (2007): 186th (one hundred and eighty sixth)
- Agriculture in Palau
- Communications in Palau
  - Internet in Palau
- Currency of Palau: Dollar
  - ISO 4217: USD
- Tourism in Palau
  - Visa policy of Palau
- Transport in Palau

== Education in Palau ==
Education in Palau

== Infrastructure of Palau ==
- Health care in Palau
- Transportation in Palau
  - Airports in Palau

== See also ==
Palau

- Index of Palau-related articles
- List of international rankings
- List of Palau-related topics
- Member state of the United Nations
- Outline of Oceania
- Palauan language
