= Index of Palau-related articles =

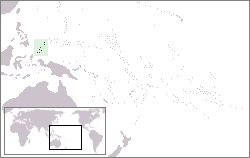
The location of the Republic of Palau

The following is an alphabetical list of topics related to the Republic of Palau.

== 0–9 ==
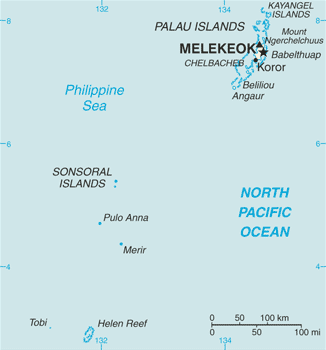
A map of the Republic of Palau

- .pw – Internet country code top-level domain for Palau

== A ==
- Aimeliik
- Air Force of Palau
- Airai
- Airports in Palau
- Angaur
- Army of Palau
- Atlas of Palau

== B ==
- Babeldaob
- Baseball in Palau
- BentProp Project
- Birds of Palau
- Bkulangriil

== C ==
- Capital of Palau: Ngerulmud
- Caroline Islands
- Categories:
  - Category:Palau
    - Category:Buildings and structures in Palau
    - Category:Communications in Palau
    - Category:Culture of Palau
    - Category:Economy of Palau
    - Category:Education in Palau
    - Category:Environment of Palau
    - Category:Geography of Palau
    - Category:Government of Palau
    - Category:History of Palau
    - Category:Military of Palau
    - Category:Palauan people
    - Category:Palau-related lists
    - Category:Politics of Palau
    - Category:Society of Palau
    - Category:Sport in Palau
    - Category:Transport in Palau
  - commons:Category:Palau
- Chelbacheb
- Cities in Palau
- Climate of Palau
- Coat of arms of Palau
- Communications in Palau
- Compact of Free Association with the United States of America
- Cuisine of Palau

== D ==
- Demographics of Palau
- Yukiwo P. Dengokl
- Diplomatic missions in Palau
- Diplomatic missions of Palau

== E ==
- Eastern Hemisphere
- Economy of Palau
- Education in Palau
- Elections in Palau
- English language
- Environment of Palau

== F ==
The Flag of Palau

- Flag of Koror
- Flag of Palau
- Foreign relations of Palau

== G ==
- Geography of Palau
- Government of Palau
- Gross domestic product

== H ==
- Hatohobei
- History of Palau

== I ==
- Imeong Conservation Area
- Imetang
- International Organization for Standardization (ISO)
  - ISO 3166-1 alpha-2 country code for the Republic of Palau: PW
  - ISO 3166-1 alpha-3 country code for the Republic of Palau: PLW
  - ISO 3166-2:PW region codes for the Republic of Palau
- Internet in Palau
- Island countries

== J ==
- Jellyfish Lake

== K ==
- Kayangel
- Koror

== L ==
- Law enforcement in Palau
- Lists:
  - Diplomatic missions of Palau
  - List of airports in Palau
  - List of archipelagos
  - List of birds of Palau
  - List of cities in Palau
  - List of countries by GDP (nominal)
  - List of diplomatic missions in Palau
  - List of island countries
    - List of island countries by area
    - List of island countries by population density
  - List of Palau-related topics
  - List of Palauans
  - List of political parties in Palau
  - List of radio stations in Palau
  - List of wettest tropical cyclones to affect Palau

== M ==
- Melanesia
- Melekeok, capital
- Micronesia
- Micronesia challenge
- Military of Palau
- Music of Palau

== N ==
- Nesopupa eapensis
- Ngaraard
- Ngarchelong
- Ngardmau
- Ngaremlengui
- Ngatpang
- Ngchesar
- Ngetbong
- Ngiwal
- Ngkeklau
- North Pacific Ocean
- Northern Hemisphere

== O ==
- Oceania
- Ollei

== P ==
- Pacific Ocean
- Palau
- Palau at the Olympics
- Palau Community College
- Palau International Airport
- Palau Islands
- Palauan language
- Peleliu
- PLW – ISO 3166-1 alpha-3 country code for the Republic of Palau
- Political parties in Palau
- Politics of Palau
- President of Palau
- Prominent Palauans
- Public holidays in Palau
- PW – ISO 3166-1 alpha-2 and USPS country code for the Republic of Palau

== R ==
- Radio stations in Palau
- Leilani Reklai
- Religion in Palau
- Republic of Palau
- Rock Islands (Palau)

== S ==
- Scouting in Palau
- Senate of Palau
- Small Island Developing States
- Sonsorol
- Southwest Islands (Palau)
- States of Palau:
  - Aimeliik
  - Airai
  - Angaur
  - Hatohobei
  - Kayangel
  - Koror
  - Melekeok
  - Ngaraard
  - Ngarchelong
  - Ngardmau
  - Ngaremlengui
  - Ngatpang
  - Ngchesar
  - Ngiwal
  - Peleliu
  - Sonsorol
- Supreme Court of Palau

== T ==
- Topic outline of Palau
- Transport in Palau
- Tropical cyclones in Palau
- Trust Territory of the Pacific Islands

== U ==
- United States-Palau relations

== W ==
- Wikimedia Atlas of Palau
- Wikipedia:WikiProject Topic outline/Drafts/Topic outline of Palau

== See also ==
- List of international rankings
- Lists of country-related topics
- Topic outline of geography
- Topic outline of Palau
