= July 1979 Palauan constitutional referendum =

9 July 1979

Results
Choice	Votes	%
Yes	4,062	92.00%
No	353	8.00%
Valid votes	4,415	98.15%
Invalid or blank votes	83	1.85%
Total votes	4,498	100.00%
Registered voters/turnout	6,995	64.3%

A constitutional referendum was held in Palau on 9 July 1979. The new constitution was approved by 92% of voters, and came into force on 1 January 1981.

The new constitution created a federal state with sixteen states. The President and Vice-President would have four year terms and would be eligible for one re-election, whilst the Palau National Congress would be bicameral. The constitution itself could only be amended by referendum and approval of at least 12 of the 16 states, and there would be a referendum at least every 15 years on whether the constitution should be revised or amended.

== Results ==
Choice	Votes	%
For	4,062	92.00
Against	353	8.00
Invalid/blank	83	–
Total	4,498	100
Registered voters/turnout	6,995	64.30
Source: Direct Democracy
