= October 1979 Palauan constitutional referendum =

23 October 1979

Results
Choice	Votes	%
Yes	1,905	30.82%
No	4,277	69.18%
Valid votes	6,182	100.00%
Invalid or blank votes	0	0.00%
Total votes	6,182	100.00%

A constitutional referendum was held in Palau on 23 October 1979, just three months after the constitution was first approved in July. The amendments were rejected by 69% of voters.

== Results ==
Choice	Votes	%
For	1,905	30.82
Against	4,277	69.18
Invalid/blank		–
Total	6,182	100
Registered voters/turnout		
Source: Direct Democracy
