= Reklai (surname) =

Reklai is a Palauan surname. Notable people with the surname include:

- Johnny Reklai (1948–2007), Palauan politician
- Leilani Reklai (born 1966), Palauan politician
