= Wildlife of Palau =

For information on the wildlife of Palau, see:

- List of birds of Palau
- List of mammals of Palau

== Fish ==
There are 1,546 observed species of native and introduced fish of Palau, both off the coast in saltwater and some species found in freshwater.

A few examples include:

- Frogfish
- Sweetlips
- Napoleon wrasse
- Wrasses
- Shortfin mako
- Barred moray
- Seahorses
- Pelagic thresher
