= Islam in Palau =

Islam is a minority religion in Palau.

Palau Central Jame Masjid, Koror

== History ==
Spain (1500–1899) and Germany (1899–1914) ruled over the island, during which the Roman Catholic and Protestant churches were active. During Japan's occupation (1919–1947), Shintoists and Buddhists expanded their religious activities.

Islam began to spread in Palau in the first decade of the 21st century when migrant workers started arriving on the archipelago. In Palau, primarily in the early 21st century, around 500 Muslims – migrant workers from Bangladesh and Pakistan – reside. The Muslims from Bangladesh have established the Bangladesh Islam Association, with Mohiuddin (Mohiuddin) serving as its president.

For the native Palauan population, the minimum wage is $2.50 per hour, while for foreign workers it is only $1.50. The number of foreign workers complaining about low wages and harsh treatment by employers is increasing. In December 2005, the Palauan government imposed a moratorium on hiring new labour from Bangladesh. According to the 2007 report by the UN Refugee Agency, the number of workers from Bangladesh in Palau increased from 163 in 2004 to 425 in 2005.

In July 2009 US President Barack Obama's administration held discussions with Palau regarding the acceptance of a group of innocent Chinese Muslims (Uyghurs) – who had been detained at Guantanamo prison. The Palauan president (2009―2013), Johnson Toribiong, allowed six Uyghur detainees from Guantanamo to settle on the island.

The US government has not found any reports of religious discrimination in Palau based on beliefs and customs.

== Demographics ==
In 2018 there were approximately 500 Muslims in Palau. Most of them are workers from Bangladesh who came to the country for job opportunities.

== Mosques ==
External image
- Palau Muslims in the mosque.

Palau has only two mosques.

== See also ==
- Religion in Palau
