= LGBTQ rights in Palau =

- Palau
- Legal status: Legal since 2014
- Military: Has no military
- Discrimination protections: No

Family rights
- Recognition of relationships: No
- Restrictions: Same-sex marriage constitutionally banned
- Adoption: No

Lesbian, gay, bisexual, transgender, and queer (LGBTQ) people in Palau do not possess the same legal protections as non-LGBTQ residents, and may face social challenges that are not experienced by others. Same-sex sexual activity has been legal in Palau since 23 July 2014, when the current Penal Code took effect, but households headed by same-sex couples are not eligible for the same legal protections available to opposite-sex married couples. Same-sex marriage is constitutionally banned, and there are no anti-discrimination laws concerning sexual orientation and gender identity.

In 2011, Palau signed the "joint statement on ending acts of violence and related human rights violations based on sexual orientation and gender identity" at the United Nations, condemning violence and discrimination against LGBTQ people.

== Legality of same-sex sexual activity ==
After recommendations from other countries at the Universal Periodic Review in October 2011, the Palauan Government promised to fully decriminalise homosexuality. In April 2014, President Tommy Remengesau Jr. signed into law the new Penal Code, which does not contain provisions outlawing consensual sex between people of the same sex. The Penal Code took effect on 23 July 2014.

Previously, male same-sex sexual activity was illegal and punishable by up to ten years in prison; however, female same-sex activity was legal.

== Recognition of same-sex relationships ==
Palau's Constitution defines marriage as between a man and a woman. The same-sex marriage ban was added to the Constitution in 2008. The ban was among the 22 amendments passed during the November 4, 2008 referendum.

In recent times, there have been moves to repeal the constitution ban on same-sex marriage. In July 2019, in response to a question at a weekly press conference about his thoughts on the issue, President Tommy Remengesau Jr. said he supports striking down the ban, saying he believes in full equality, branding it discriminatory, "Those who are different doesn't mean that they should be outcast, second class citizens, or that they can't contribute to the community. So I want to make it clear that I don't believe in the constitutional amendment that promote[s] discrimination. I want it to be on record that I support the rights of each individual, any Palauan, to be treated equally... Let us treat each other with respect and dignity. This won't be positive for us at the UN level as the trend worldwide is opening up to these individual rights, but we are taking a step backward." Remengesau finished his statements, with "as long as they believe in God like everyone else, we can treat each other with respect and dignity". Local activists applauded his comments, calling it a "very surprising and progressive act".

== Living conditions ==
Open displays of affection between same-sex partners may offend.

In Palauan, the terms mengol a otaor (which literally translates to carrying a large driftwood) and menga tuu (banana eater) refer to homosexual men. They are considered derogatory.

Several gay Palauans have chosen to emigrate to neighboring Guam or the United States due to societal rejection they may face at home.

== Summary table ==
Same-sex sexual activity legal	Yes (Since 2014)
Equal age of consent (17)	Yes (Since 2014)
Anti-discrimination laws in employment only	No
Anti-discrimination laws in the provision of goods and services	No
Anti-discrimination laws in all other areas (Incl. indirect discrimination, hate speech)	No
Same-sex marriage	No (Constitutional ban since 2008)
Recognition of same-sex couples	No
Stepchild adoption by same-sex couples	No
Joint adoption by same-sex couples	No
LGBTQ people allowed to serve openly in the military	Has no military
Right to change legal gender	No
Access to IVF for lesbians	No
Commercial surrogacy for gay male couples	No
MSMs allowed to donate blood	No

== See also ==
- Human rights in Palau
- LGBT rights in Oceania
