= Tet el Bad Stone Coffin =

Stone coffin on the World Heritage tentative list

Coordinates: 7°43′09.51″N 134°36′47.93″E

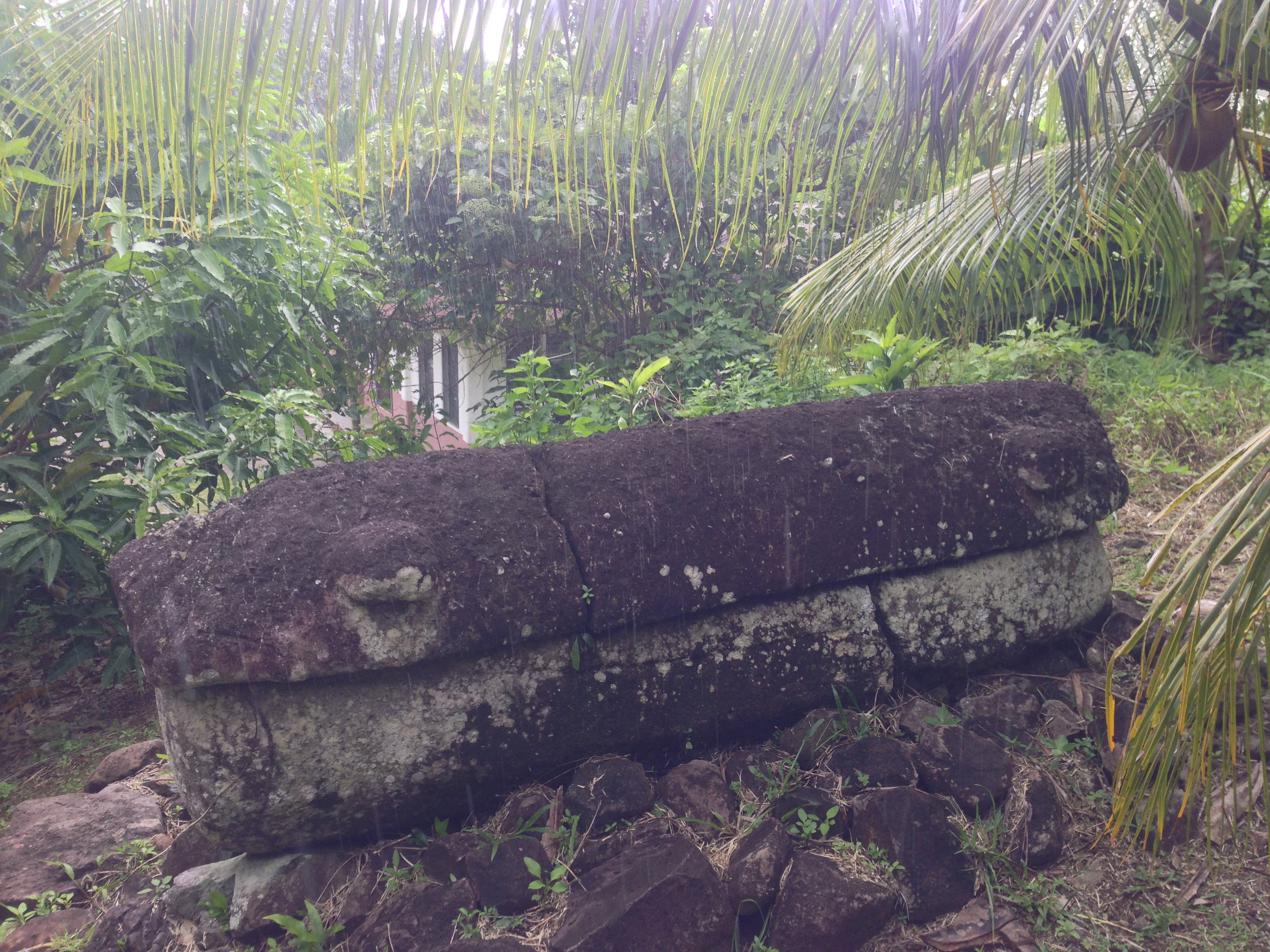
View of the Tet el Bad stone coffin.

The stone coffin of Tet el Bad is located in the village of Ollei, Ngarchelong State, Palau.

== Site description ==
The ornately carved stone coffin resides in the village of Ollei on the village chief's stone meeting platform.

== World Heritage Status ==
This site was added to the UNESCO World Heritage Tentative List on August 26, 2004 in the Cultural category.
