= List of Palauans =

This is a list of notable people from Palau.

== Politicians ==
- Johnson Toribiong, President of the Republic (2009–2012)
- Tommy Remengesau, President of the Republic (2001–2009) (2012–2020)
- Elias Camsek Chin, Senator in 8th OEK (National Congress); Former Vice-president of the Republic (2005–2009) Former President of the Senate 9th OEK.
- Kerai Mariur, former vice-president of the Republic (2009–2012); Floor Leader of the 10th OEK; VP Senate 11th OEK
- Hokkons Baules, current President of the Senate 11th OEK. Senator 2nd, and 7th-11th OEK.
- Ngiratkel Etpison, President of the Republic (1989–1993)
- Kuniwo Nakamura, President of the Republic (1993–2001, 2016)
- Sandra Pierantozzi, former Vice President of the Republic (2001–2004), Senator (1996–2001, 2016, Minister of Administration (1992–1993), Minister of Finance (2001–2002, Minister of Health (2002–2005), Minister of State (2009–2010), and serves as honorary consul of the Czech Republic in Palau
- Haruo Remeliik, first President of the Republic (1981–1985)
- Lazarus Salii, President of the Republic (1985–1988)
- Roman Tmetuchl, former Palauan politician and businessman
- Surangel S. Whipps, (Presidential candidate (2008), President of the Senate (2001–2009), Speaker of the House of Delegates (1985–2001), member of Council of Chiefs as Rekemesik of Inglai Clan of Ngatpang State (1997–present))
- Surangel Whipps Jr., business man, former Senator (2008–2016), and President of Palau since 2021
- Uduch Sengebau Senior, attorney, former judge, former Senator, and Vice President of Palau since 2021

== Artists and performers ==
- Sha Merirei, Palauan-American artist and activist
- Bligh Madris, first Palauan MLB Player; debuted on June 20, 2022, for the Pittsburgh Pirates
- Tom Tarkong Michelsen, Palauan actor based in Hollywood, known for TV and voiceover work. Credits include How to Get Away with Murder, Magnum P.I., Jane the Virgin, HBO's Room 104, Netflix's The Brothers Sun, and voice roles on Disney Jr.’s RoboGobo and Kindergarten: The Musical.
- Hermana Ramarui, Palauan poet and educator

== Others ==
- Justin Hirosi, convicted for the DePaiva family murders in December 2003 in Airai.
