= List of rivers of Palau =

This is a list of the rivers of Palau, all of which are located on Babeldaob. They are listed in clockwise order, starting at the north end of the island. Alternate names are given in parentheses.

- Lmetmellasch (Mutukl River)
- Ngeredekuu (Ngareboku River)
- Ngerdorch (Garudokku, Ngardok River, Ngdorak River)
  - Merong (Amerong River)
  - Meskelat
- Ngrikiil (Geriiki River, Ngerikil River)
  - Edeng
  - Kmekumel (Kumekumeyel River)
- Ngerimel (Gihmel River)
- Ngerderar (Ngarderartaog)
- Isemiich (Aisemiich, Aisemith River, Barrak River)
- Tabecheding (Tabagaten River, Tobagnding River)
- Ngetpang (Ngesenhong River)
- Ngermeskang (Almiokan River, Almongui River, Arumonogui River, Gabatouru River, Garumisukan River, Kloultaog)
  - Nkebeduul (Gabatouru River)
- Chomet Ubet (Omobodo River)
- Omoachel ra Ngchesuch
  - Ngerdesiur (Nedeshelu River, Ngeresiuur River)
- Omoachel ra Mekaud (Amekaud River, Ngaramasech)
- Ngereksong (Arukuson River)
- Kabekel (Kabokel River, Marcon River)
- Irur (Ailol River, Airoru River)
- Ngerchetang (Galkatan River, Garukatan River, Ngaragatong River)
- Diongradid (Adeiddo River, Adelildo River, aDid River, Arattsu River, Ateshi River, Taoch ra Iwekei)
- Ngolsang
- Ouang
- Desengong
