= Ollei =

Village in Palau

Coordinates: 7.7193°N 134.6133°E

Ollei (Sometimes called Konlei, as well as variations of the two names, such as Konrei and Olei) is a small fishing village in the Pacific island nation of Palau. It has a population of slightly over 100 people and is located in the State of Ngarchelong, near the northern tip of the Babeldaob island. The village is built along a single road which connects it the rest of the island. Facing west from the village is a large boating dock, which juts out about one fifth of a mile into the ocean . The nearest populated village is that of Mengellang, the capital of the state.

Monolith in Ollei

Ollei is the location of Tet el Bad Stone Coffin, which was added to the UNESCO World Heritage Tentative List in 2004. A sightworthy monolith can be visited in the village.
