= Human rights in Palau =

The Republic of Palau has had a turbulent history over the last 450 years, with many states claiming ownership over them. Since World War II, the Islands came under United Nations' trusteeship and were administered by the United States. After becoming a sovereign state in 1994, Palau joined the UN and ratified the Convention on the Rights of the Child in 1995, the Convention on the Rights of Persons with Disabilities and the optional protocol to the latter in 2013. In 2011, the International Covenant on Civil and Political Rights in 2011 and other core human rights treaties were signed. These treaties are yet to be ratified.

Palau's constitution and laws confer most human rights to its citizens, and with the UN and the United States continuing to have a strong influence over the island nation, Palau is continuing to work towards complying with human rights standards expounded by the UN.

== International treaties ==
In September 2011, Palau signed seven core human rights treaties. The Pacific Office of the United Nations High Commissioner for Human Rights congratulated Palau on these signatures, noting that "the commitment shown by these signatures is remarkable and gives a clear message that Palau has now started a journey to provide people in the country with a stronger foundation to enjoy human rights and fundamental freedoms."

== Convention on the Rights of the Child ==
Traditional Palauan culture and current constitutional protection afford a high degree of care to Palauan children. It is noted that the situation for children is generally good and that in some instances there is a higher degree of protection than is mandated for in the Convention on the Rights of the Child. There is a strong family dynamic, which includes extended family all taking part in "the child's evolving capacity" and "best interests". However, Palau is experiencing extreme change to their economic, cultural and societal nature, due globalization and climate change.

=== Child abuse ===
Along with strong care of the child, most adults in Palau are comfortable with physical discipline, this is because in both civil society and law, discipline and control of children are seen as a right and responsibility of the parents. In 2001, seven years after the signing of the CRC, the United Nations Committee on the Rights of the Child were concerned about the increasing trend of abuse, including sexual, domestic violence, ill-treatment and neglect to the children of Palau. There was also concern about the lack of legal provisions that enabled the Government to step in and remove a child from the situation.

It was argued that this increase in abuse was due to changing family structure and increasing alcohol and drug intake. Victims of Crime Assistance (VOCA), which handles abuse cases, have found that 80% of the cases are associated with alcohol abuse. In 2009 according to RefWorld, there were 25 reported cases of child abuse. These varied between physical abuse (Eight), neglect (Six) but the most serious was that of sexual abuse (Eleven). Seven of these cases arrived at court and only three resulted in convictions.

Education has been a main proponent of decreasing physical abuse along with stronger laws, which both seem to have had an impact. It was found by RefWorld in 2013 that although there are still some isolated reports of child neglect, law enforcement officers are treating the issue more seriously and any complaints made are aggressively investigated and prosecuted. Also the Office of Victims of Crimes, work with children who have suffered abuse and the families involved. It appears that Children's rights are generally respected in this regard traditionally and that the State is working on educating parents on the dangers of physical and emotional abuse and that if there are problems of abuse, that the child is properly cared for.

=== Education and health ===
Education in Palau has always been considered to be incredibly important. In the 1920s almost 90% of Palaunan children were enrolled at school. Education is free and universal provided by the Government of Palau. In 2007 around 11% of GDP was allocated in expenditure to the education sector. Legislation mandates school attendance from the age of 6 until 17 years of age, which contributes to high literacy rates. There have been concerns that the curriculum is out of date. The Government has responded to criticisms and prepared a series of 10 year master plans that work toward increasing the quality of education. The most recent plan spanning from 2006 to 2016.

The plans focus on student achievement and quality of instruction by improving teacher training and certification, upgrading school facilities, improving school governance, strengthening student support services, and making the curriculum more relevant. In addition to this, children have a wide range of opportunities offered to them outside of a formal education, which include cultural expression and recreational activities.

Generally the children are quite healthy. The Palauan children have a low prevalence of malnourishment and there is no evidence to suggest that there is any food poverty. However, the diet of the Palauan people is poor and contributes to malnutrition and a high incidence of children being overweight. Despite this there is a well-funded system of medical care for children, with no discrimination based on gender. There is discrimination when it comes to children who are not born in Palau. Admittedly there is only a small number of these children but they are not eligible for Palauan citizenship, which can cause problems as under law only those of Palauan' descent are entitled to free education and health. The Committee of the Rights of the Child and the United States has noted this as a concern, as this type of discrimination is aimed at young vulnerable children.

== Convention on the Rights of Persons with Disabilities ==
Palau was the sixth Pacific Islands Forum nation to sign the Convention on the Rights of Persons with Disabilities. The rights of disabled people are applicable to all disabled, young or elderly and are generally respected, with the Government enforcing these rights through legal means. Art. 4.5 of the Constitution designate disabled people to be a vulnerable group entitled to special consideration by the government and acts include Disabled Persons Anti-discrimination Act and a Handicapped Children Act.

These laws require access to government buildings, which is usually enforced and public schools have established special programs in order to cater to the needs of disabled children. The Government also provides those with disabilities a monthly amount of $50, along with all measures designed to assist them so that they can be as self-reliant as possible. Disabled are also treated as close as possible as to those who are the same age, therefore they are entitled to the same living conditions, protected from exploitation and abuse and they have organizations that liaise with the Government and look after the rights of disabled people.

Palau is continuing to work towards strengthening the rights of disabled people. In October 2013, Palau held a three-day workshop to discuss ways to "strengthen support and ensure a better quality of life for person's living under disabilities". Together with Omekesang Disabled Persons Organization, The Pacific Islands Forum Secretariat (PIFS) and the Pacific Disability Forum (PDF), discussion centered around the continued effective implementation of the Convention on the Rights of Persons with Disabilities, where the Minister of Health Gregorio Ngirmang promised that "The Ministry of Health will continue to provide full support to activities related to persons with disabilities; in particular, providing better health related services". The point was made that it was not just a matter of advocating and promoting rights but also working towards more support so that the aims of the convention can be fully realized.

== International Covenant on Civil and Political Rights ==
=== Religious freedom ===
In 2011, one of the treaties signed was the International Covenant on Civil and Political Rights. Part II, Art II provided that "Each State Party to the present Covenant undertakes to respect and to ensure to all individuals within its territory and subject to its jurisdiction the rights recognised in the present Covenant, without distinction of any kind, such as…… religion…..birth or other status". This can be found in accordance with Art. 18 of the Universal Declaration of Human Rights, everyone has the right to freedom of thought, conscience and religion... and freedom, either alone or in community with others and in public or private, to manifest his religion or belief in teaching, practice, worship and observance.

In accordance with this human right the Constitution of Palau states that in respect of religious freedom; "The Govt shall take no action to deny or impair the freedom of conscience or of philosophical or religious belief of any person nor take any action to compel, prohibit or hinder the exercise of religion. The Government shall not recognized or establish a national religion, but may provide assistance to private or parochial schools on a fair and equitable basis for non-religious purposes" (Article IV, Section I of the Constitution).

It further states that; "The Government shall take no action to discriminate against any person on the basis of sex, race, place of origin, language, religion or belief, social status or clan affiliation except for the preferential treatment of citizens, for protection of minors, elderly, indigent, physically or mentally handicapped, and other similar groups, and in matters concerning intr[a]state succession and domestic relations" (Art IV). Palau generally respects a person's religious freedom with not only the Constitution in place to protect individual's rights, but other laws and policies.

While religious organizations have to apply to register with the Government, they are never denied. Further there are no reports of Religious discrimination based on belief or practice from any individual from the state and as mentioned above, while the government does not sponsor nor promote religious groups and activities (including public schools), representatives of any religious group may request financial support for religious schools. The Government also observes Christmas as a national holiday, due to the vast majority of the population being Christian.

It is estimated that the population of Palau is around 21,000 with the largest domination being Roman Catholic making up 65% of the population. Other religions include Evangelical Church with around 2000 followers, Seventh-day Adventists around 1000, Modekengei (unique to the country) 1800, Latter Day Saints are around 300, and the smallest group is Jehovah's Witnesses who are around 90.

The Government continues to ban work permits for citizens of Bangladesh, India and Sri Lanka. The Bangladesh ban was imposed in 1998 while the India and Sri Lanka ban occurred in 2001. These bans were largely motivated due to employers complaints that non-Christian religious practices were interfering in living arrangements of employee families and activities in the work place. Workers from these countries who were already in Palau were not deported and the small Islamic Community of 400 from Bangladesh continues to be allowed to conduct prayers at work during the day and in their own homes. There does not seem to be impediments to their practice of religion or to their continued employment.

== See also ==
- LGBT rights in Palau
