= Scouting in Palau =

Aloha Council Palau

Scouting in Palau is in a state of development and growth. Scouting has existed in the islands since at least the 1970s, and may have been developed as early as the 1950s. Scott Lieber helped start a Scouting organization in Palau in 1983.

Like the other former Trust Territories of the Pacific, Boy Scouting in Palau is developing as part of the Aloha Council Pacific Basin District. Its Order of the Arrow lodge is Nā Mokupuni O Lawelawe Lodge #567.
