= Geography of Palau =

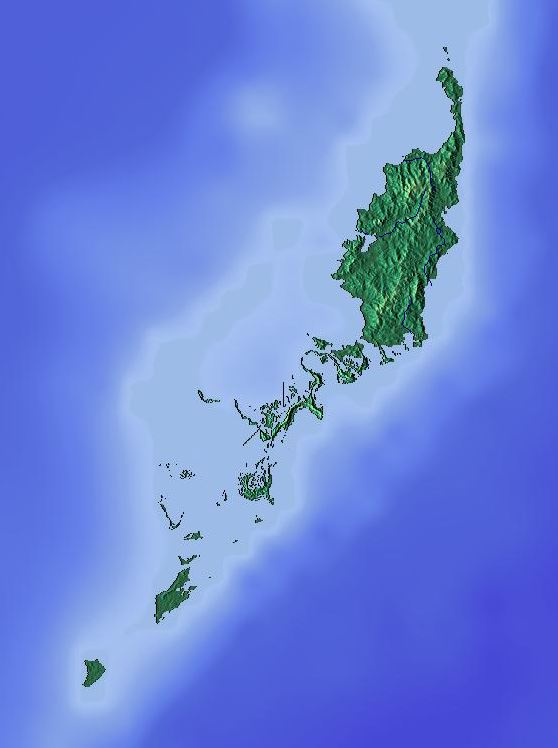
- Continent: Pacific Ocean
- Region: Oceania
- Coordinates: 7°30′N 134°30′E
- Area: Ranked 179th
  - Total: 459 km^{2} (177 sq mi)
  - Land: 99%
  - Water: 1%
- Coastline: 1,519 km (944 mi)
- Borders: None
- Highest point: Mount Ngerchelchuus; 242 metres (794 ft)
- Lowest point: Pacific Ocean; 0 m
- Exclusive economic zone: 603,978 km^{2} (233,197 mi^{2})

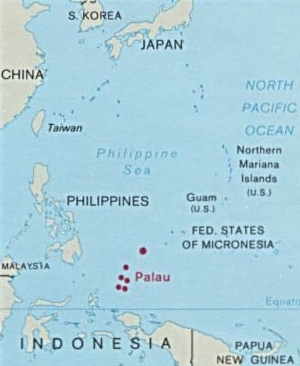
Map of Palau and its location in Oceania

The Republic of Palau consists of eight principal islands and more than 250 smaller ones lying roughly 500 miles southeast of the Philippines, in Oceania. The islands of Palau constitute the westernmost part of the Caroline Islands chain. The country includes the World War II battleground of Peleliu and the Rock Islands, a UNESCO World Heritage Site. The total land area is 459 km^{2} (177 mi^{2}). It has the 42nd largest Exclusive Economic Zone of 603,978 km^{2} (233,197 mi^{2}).

== Landform ==
The Palau archipelago contains more than 250 islands and islets stretched along a 150 km north south trending arc in the western Pacific. Its center is located near 7° north latitude, some 650 km north of Jayapura on the island of New Guinea, and near 134° east latitude, some 900 km east of Mindanao, Philippines.

The geologically diverse archipelago is dominated by Babeldaob, primarily a volcanic island, whose 363 km^{2} area represents more than three fourths of Palau's total land mass. The remaining 90 km^{2} are divided among three volcanic islands, two atolls, and numerous uplifted coralline limestone islands. These limestone islands, primarily situated in the archipelago center between Oreor and Beliliou islands, are known as the "rock islands." The limestone islands of Beliliou and Angaur, called platform islands, are not considered rock islands for various physiographic and culture historical reasons. There are several small islands, including Sonsorol and Tochobei (Tobi), some distance southwest of Angaur.

== Geology ==
The Palau Islands are composed chiefly of accumulated volcanic material and limestone. Geologists distinguish three geologic units of erupted volcanic breccia and interbedded tuff. Weathered material from exposed upper parts of the volcanic islands was eroded away and accumulated in shallow coastal waters forming deposits of clay. The substrata of the volcanic islands are volcanic breccias and tuffs, some flow material, conglomerates, and related sediments. The sediments are extensively lateritic clays and are strongly acid. The Airai clay deposit covers much of southeastern Babeldaob Island and exceeds 45 m thick.

The rock islands, the platform islands and the eastern half of Oreor Island are made up of Palau limestone. The limestone is raised coralline reef structure which formed in the warm tropical waters during Miocene to Pleistocene times. Surrounding the volcanic islands are natural terraced benches resulting from sea level changes and uplifting of the Palau ridge. Two levels of natural terraced benches have been recognized. One bench is 1 m to 2 m above mean sea level, while a second, and much broader, bench is 5 to 10 m above mean sea level. Many villages on Babeldaob Island are built on this second bench. Geologic data indicate that Babeldaob Island has undergone a net uplift of land relative to sea level of about 2 m in the last 4000 years; thus, for most of the Palau coastline, submerged habitation sites in intertidal and coastal swamp areas are unlikely. Excepting a few calcareous sand beaches, the rock island edges rise abruptly out of the water, forming steep cliffs. Distinctive geologic features of the rock islands are shear cliffs and a notch cut back into the cliff just above mean sea level.

== Oceanography ==
Most of the Republic of Palau lies within the influence of both the North Equatorial Current (NEC, flowing east to west) and the Equatorial Countercurrent (ECC, flowing west to east). The influence of the NEC is strongest between November and May, when the trade winds prevail, and the ECC predominates the rest of the year. The Southwest Islands lie more deeply within the influence of the ECC. Sea surface temperatures range from 81 to 86 °F (27 to 30 °C) throughout the year. Subsurface temperatures to about 320 ft (98 m) rarely fall below 79 °F (26 °C). Below this depth, the temperature drops quickly to less than 50 °F (10 °C) at approximately 590 ft (180 m). The constant heating of the ocean surface in the tropics creates a highly stratified temperature regime in the water column, with little mixing. This general regime may vary locally or seasonally, as in the case of the upwelling of cold subsurface waters along steep leeward islands slopes.

== Soils ==
According to the 1983 Soil Conservation Service survey (Smith, 1983), there are roughly 18 kinds of soils in Palau, exhibiting a wide variety of texture, drainage, depth and fertility characteristics. To paraphrase the survey's summary, upland volcanic and limestone island soils are well-drained, limestone island soils excessively so. Upland volcanic island soils range from nearly level to very steep and are fine-textured, while bottom land soils are poorly drained or saturated. Limestone island soils may be either level, deep and sandy or steep, shallow and loamy in areas where they are associated with rock outcrops.

== Statistics ==
The area of Palau is slightly more than 2.5 times the size of the US city of Washington, DC.

Maritime claims:
territorial sea: 12 nautical miles
exclusive economic zone: 603,978 km^{2} (233,197 mi^{2}) (200 nmi)

Elevation extremes:
lowest point: Pacific Ocean 0 m
highest point: Mount Ngerchelchauus 242 meters (794 ft) (on Babeldaob)

Land use:
arable land: 2.17%
permanent crops: 4.35%
other: 93.48% (2011)

Environment - international agreements:
party to: Biodiversity, Climate Change, Climate Change-Kyoto Protocol, Desertification, Law of the Sea

Terrain varies geologically from the high, mountainous main island of Babeldaob to low, coral islands usually fringed by large barrier reefs. Natural resources consist of forests, minerals (especially gold), marine products, and deep-seabed minerals. Current environmental issues include inadequate facilities for disposal of solid waste; threats to the marine ecosystem from sand and coral dredging, illegal fishing practices, and overfishing.

== Climate ==
The climate of the Palau Islands is defined as being maritime tropical, characterized by little variation seasonally or diurnally. The country has a Köppen Climate Classification of Af (Tropical Rainforest Climate). It rains almost daily. Short but torrential storms provide over 3.8m annually. Prolonged dry spells or droughts are rare. The northeast trade winds, usually blowing from December to July bring frequent rains and often a slightly drier time from February through April. The southwest trade winds are often associated with more violent storms. Although the Palau Islands are outside of the main typhoon zone, several damaging typhoons have struck the islands. The mean annual temperature is 27 °C, with a range in variation of less than 4 °C from the coolest months, January and February, to the warmest month, April. The daily variation averages only 6 °C. The humidity is very high, averaging 82% annually.

Climate data for Palau (Köppen Af)
Month	Jan	Feb	Mar	Apr	May	Jun	Jul	Aug	Sep	Oct	Nov	Dec	Year
Mean daily maximum °C (°F)	30.6 (87.1)	30.6 (87.1)	30.9 (87.6)	31.3 (88.3)	31.4 (88.5)	31.0 (87.8)	30.6 (87.1)	30.7 (87.3)	30.9 (87.6)	31.1 (88.0)	31.4 (88.5)	31.1 (88.0)	31.0 (87.7)
Daily mean °C (°F)	27.3 (81.1)	27.2 (81.0)	27.5 (81.5)	27.9 (82.2)	28.0 (82.4)	27.6 (81.7)	27.4 (81.3)	27.5 (81.5)	27.7 (81.9)	27.7 (81.9)	27.9 (82.2)	27.7 (81.9)	27.6 (81.7)
Mean daily minimum °C (°F)	23.9 (75.0)	23.9 (75.0)	24.1 (75.4)	24.4 (75.9)	24.5 (76.1)	24.2 (75.6)	24.1 (75.4)	24.3 (75.7)	24.5 (76.1)	24.4 (75.9)	24.4 (75.9)	24.2 (75.6)	24.2 (75.6)
Average rainfall mm (inches)	271.8 (10.70)	231.6 (9.12)	208.3 (8.20)	220.2 (8.67)	304.5 (11.99)	438.7 (17.27)	458.2 (18.04)	379.7 (14.95)	301.2 (11.86)	352.3 (13.87)	287.5 (11.32)	304.3 (11.98)	3,758.3 (147.97)
Average rainy days	19.0	15.9	16.7	14.8	20.0	21.9	21.0	19.8	16.8	20.1	18.7	19.9	224.6
Mean monthly sunshine hours	198.4	194.9	244.9	234.0	210.8	168.0	186.0	176.7	198.0	179.8	183.0	182.9	2,357.4
Source: Hong Kong Observatory

== Vegetation ==
Share of forest area in total land area, top countries (2021). Palau has the fifth highest percentage of forest cover in the world.

The volcanic islands contain heavily eroded hills reaching heights of 250m above sea level, while the rock islands and atolls vary in elevation from sandy relict beaches a few meters above sea level to jagged limestone hills more than 200m high. The islands all are covered with dense stands of mixed tropical forest; in addition, the volcanic islands contain numerous areas of savanna and a broad belt of coastal mangrove swampland. An extensive barrier reef surrounds the central islands of the archipelago, forming a rich lagoon area of more than 1200 km^{2}. Variations in soil type, elevation, and human activity have led to the development of distinctive plant communities. At present, only 75% of the Palau Islands are forested, the rest being covered by secondary vegetation, marsh, grassland, crop land, urban development, or are barren.

Several types of forest communities can be observed in Palau. Upland forests are found on the volcanic islands' uplands and include a great diversity of species. The variety of trees includes hard woods, palms, and pandanus. On the lower slopes, especially around settlements, the upland forest association becomes mixed with four other forest communities including the plantation forest, the palm forest, the agroforest, and the coconut plantation associations. These four forest communities include a wide variety of food producing species in tree gardens or kitchen gardens. Interspersed throughout these food producing forest associations are areas of cropland and urban development. The important resources of the food producing forest associations include coconut, breadfruit, mango, banana, almond, and betelnut.

Important resources in the gardens include several species of targ cassava, pineapple, and tobacco . Most cropland in Palau is divided into small garden areas. The swamp forest and mangrove forest associations are found on coastal lowlands where the terrain is level, especially surrounding the volcanic islands but also including large portions of Beliliou Island. These forests serve to hold eroding soil from washing into the lagoon and thus provide a natural buffer to protect the lagoon. The swamp forest is also found in upland areas on the volcanic islands where poor drainage conditions exist. Distinctive forest communities are found on the atolls, the rock islands and on the platform islands. Included in these communities is the casuarina forest with the needle-bearing ironwood tree (ngas)." In addition to the forest associations on the volcanic islands are large areas of grasslands and savanna. The grassland/savanna association accounts for 16% of the total area of Palau (6,783 hectares out of a total of 41,619) and most (99%) of this association is found on Babeldaob Island. While some of this association is the result of human activity, at least a portion of the association is found on poor soils. In Palauan, these open areas are called ked. Most of the prehistoric terraces identified in Palau are associated with these unforested areas.

== Relief ==
The relief of the country varies from the hilly main island of Babeldaob to the low, coral islands, usually bordered by large barrier reefs. Average altitude - no data available; the lowest point is the water level of the Pacific Ocean (0 m); The highest point is Mount Ngerchelchuus (242 m).

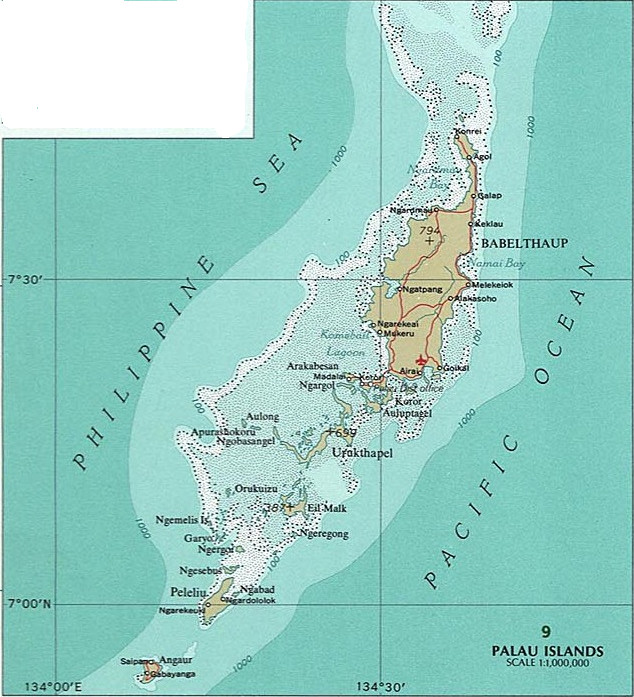
Relief of Palau

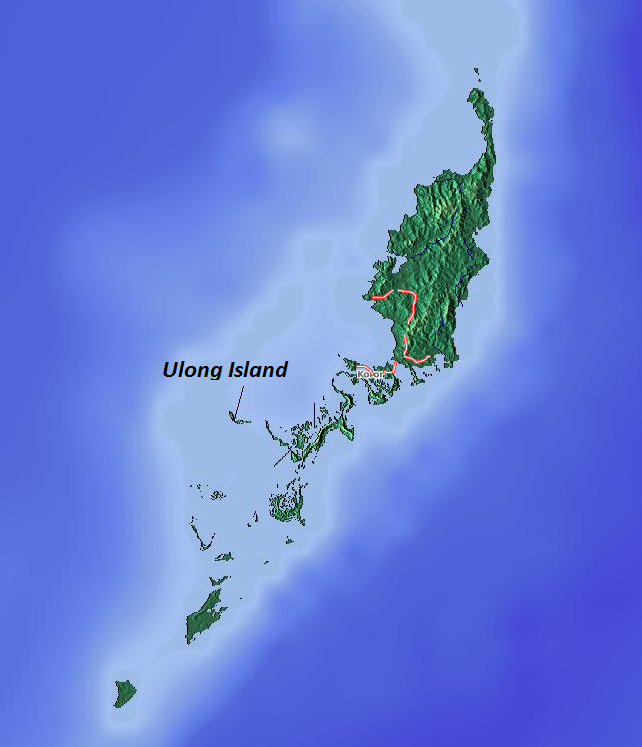
Ulong Island, Palau

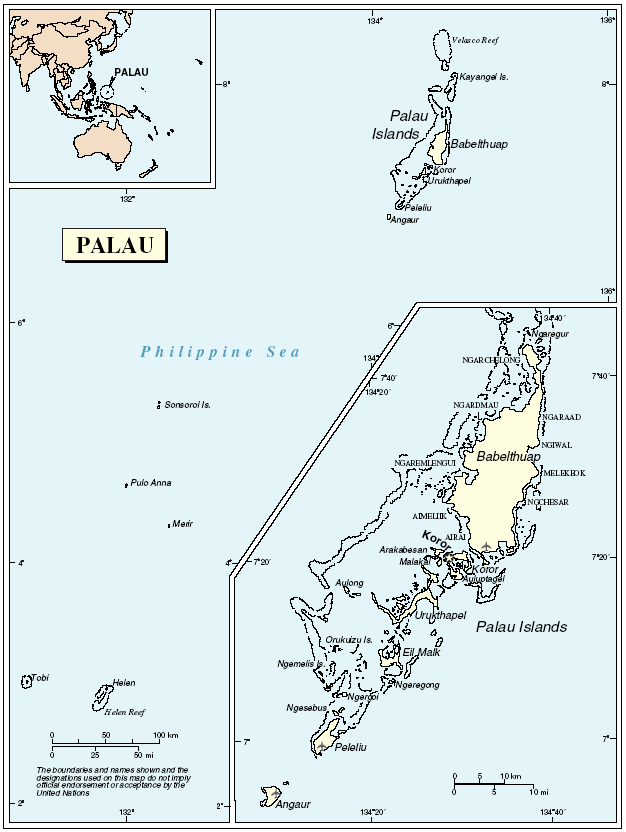
Palau geography map

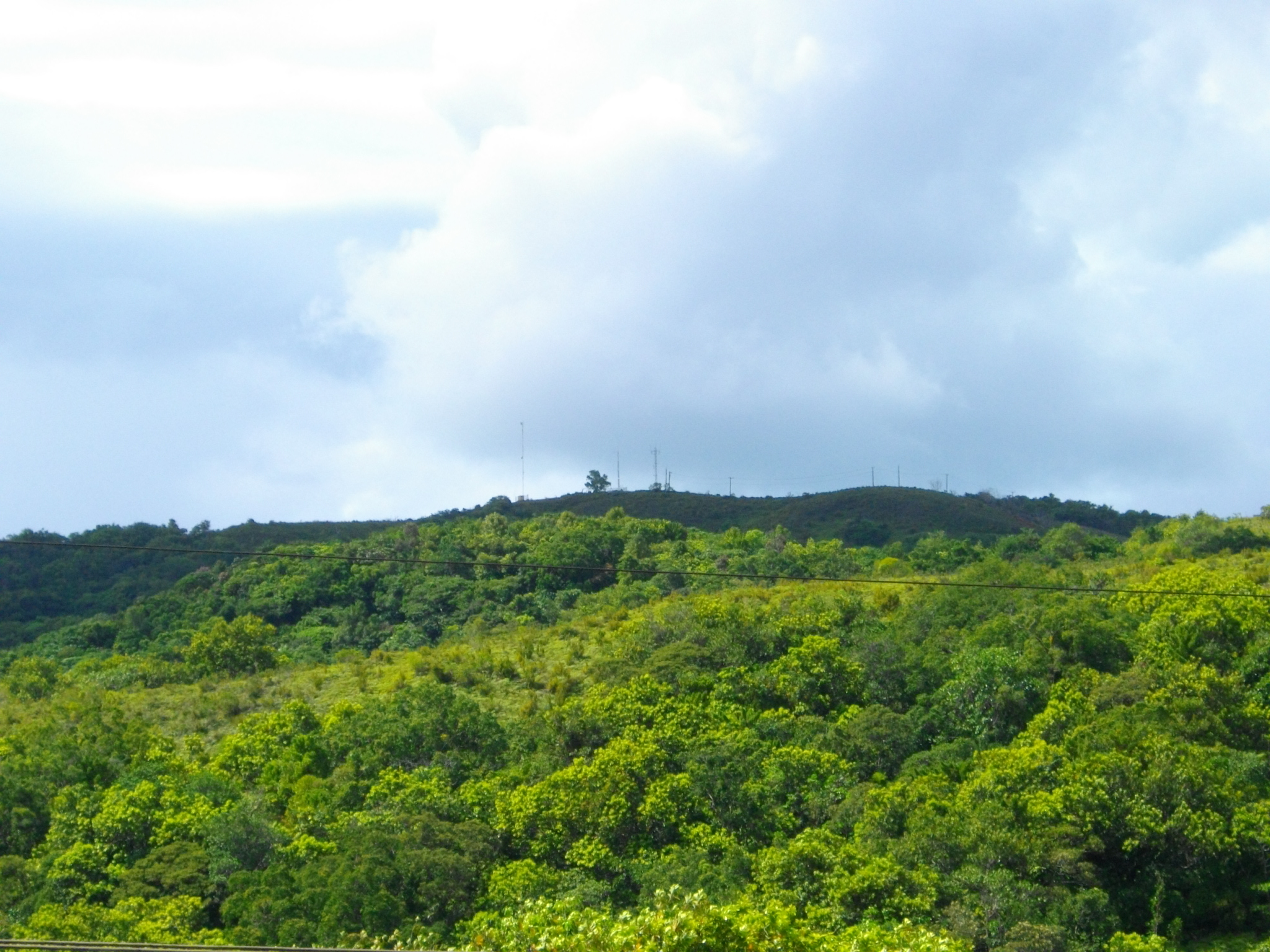
Mount Ngerchelchuus

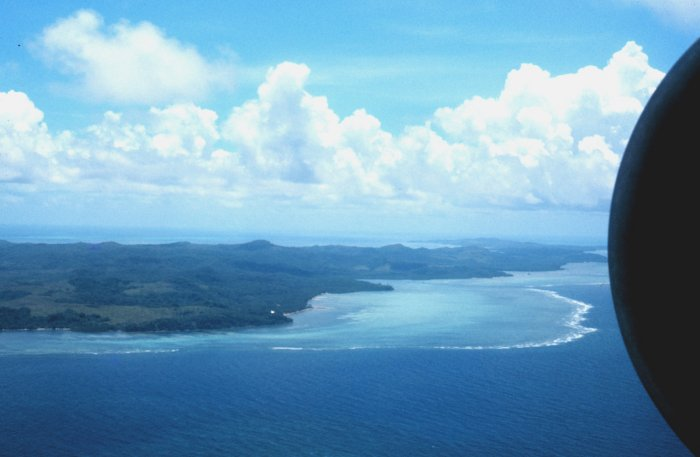
Aerial view of Babeldaob

== Islands ==
Palau Islands

Angaur Island

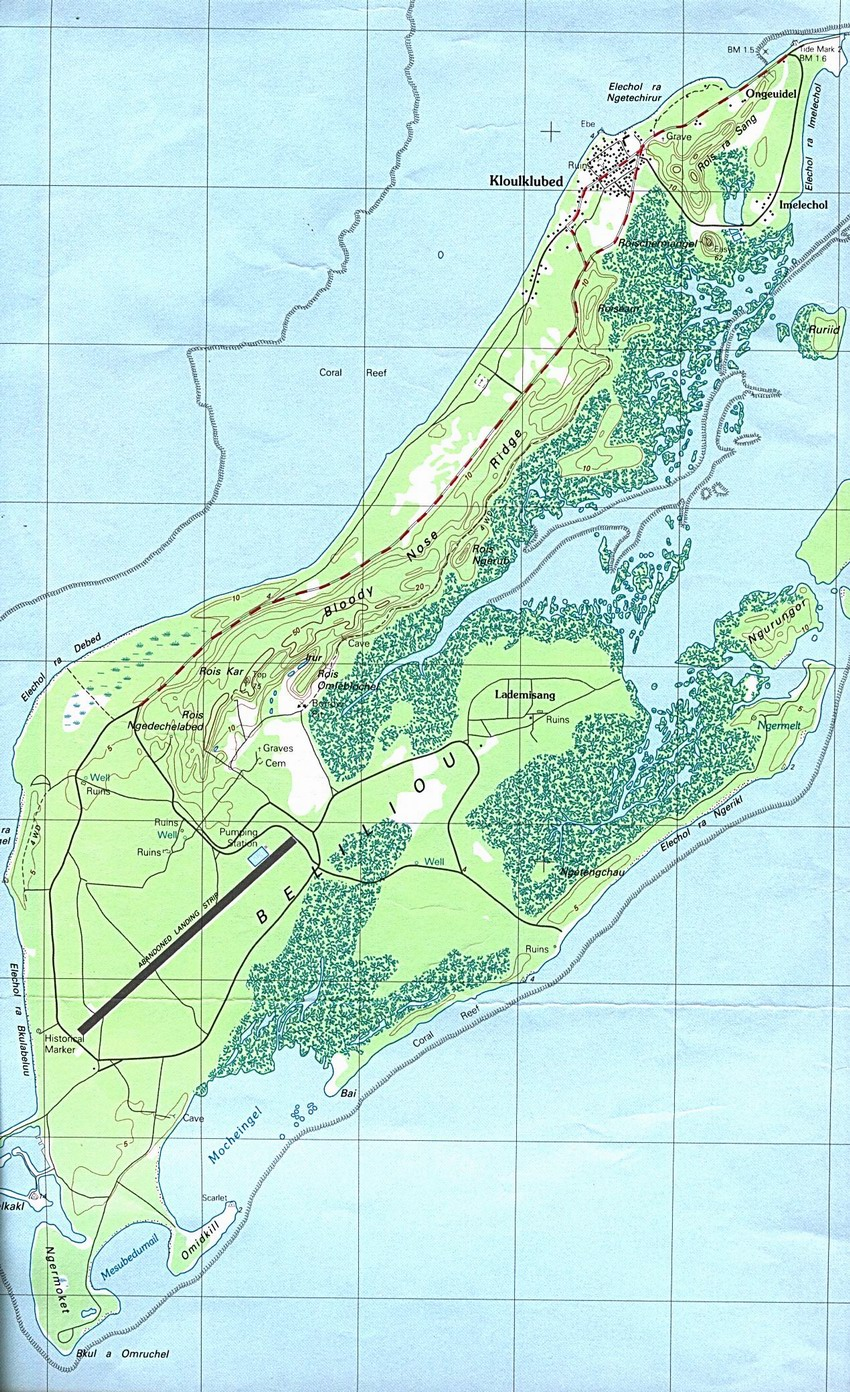
Peleliu

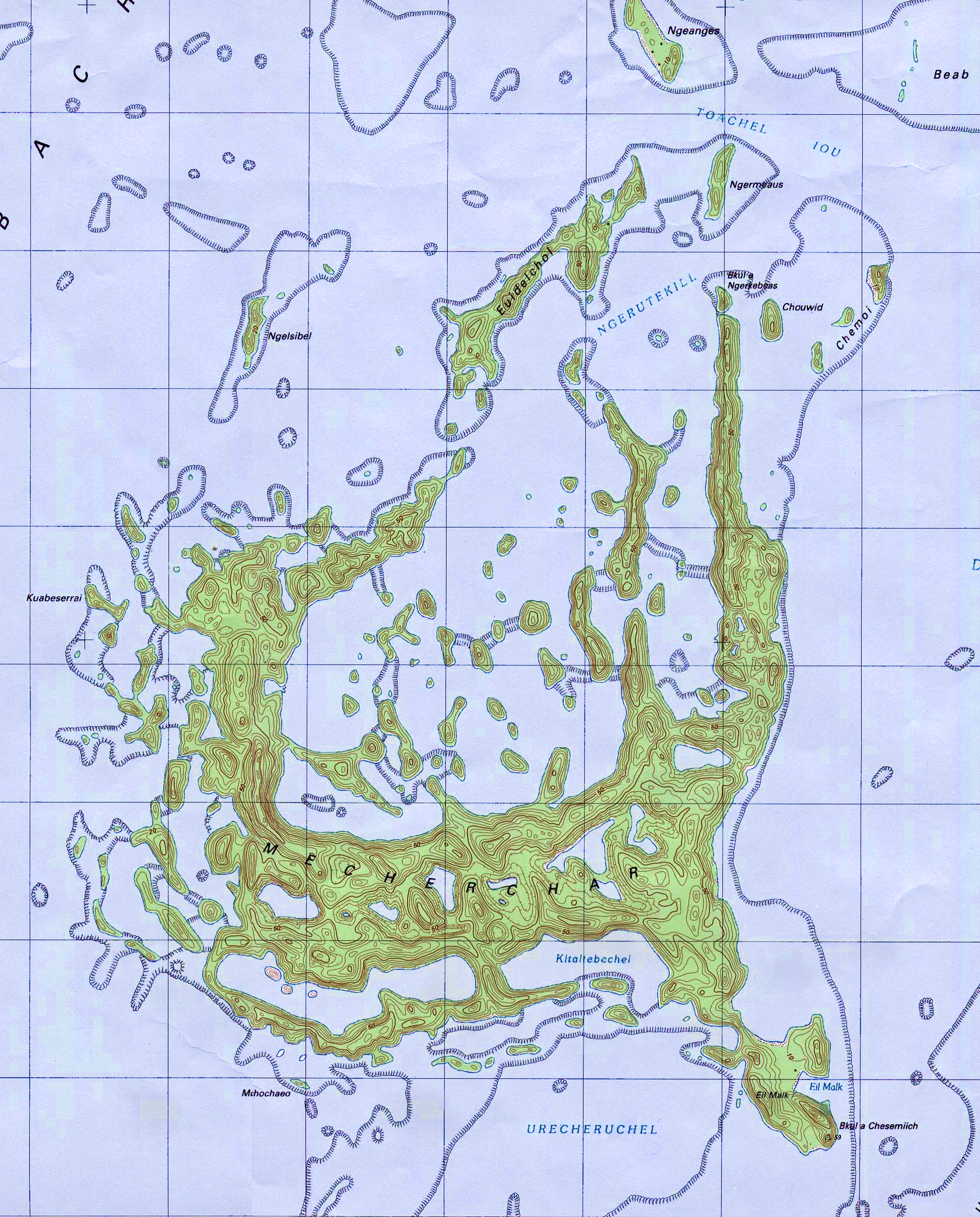
Mecherchar

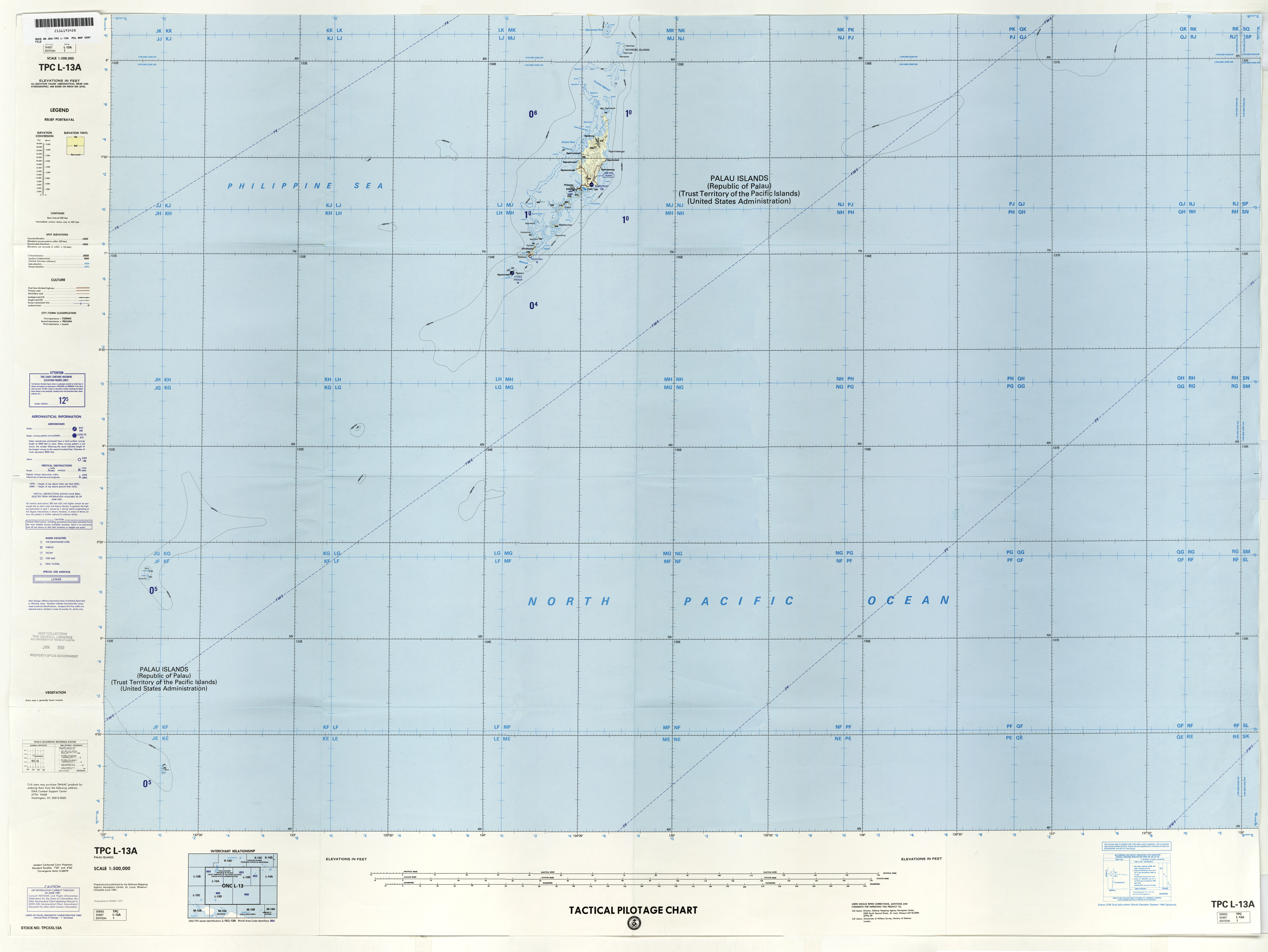
Map including most of the islands of Palau (DMA, 1991)

== Extreme points ==
This is a list of the extreme points of Palau, the points that are farther north, south, east or west than any other location.

- Northernmost point – Ngaruangel Reef, Kayangel state*
- Easternmost point – Kayangel islet, Kayangel state
- Southernmost point – Round Rock, Helen Reef, Hatohobei state
- Westernmost point - Tobi Island, Hatohobei state
- *Note: if submerged reefs are included then Velasco reef is Palau's northernmost point
