= List of radio stations in Palau =

The following is a partial list of radio stations in Palau.

According to The World Factbook, as of 2019 there are six radio stations in Palau: 1 A.M. & 5 F.M. Two of these stations (T8AA FM and AM) are operated by the Palau National Communications Corporation for use by the Government of Palau.

Call Sign	Frequency	Station	Transmitter	Operator	Format
T8AA	1584 AM	Eco Paradise AM	Malakal	Local Government	News/Talk
T8AA	87.9 FM	Eco Paradise FM	Malakal	Local Government	News/Talk
KRFM	88.9 FM	Island Rhythm	Koror	Island Rhythm	Music
WWFM	89.5 FM	Diaz Broadcasting	Ngemmid	Diaz Broadcasting	News/Talk, Music
PWFM	89.9 FM	Palau Wave Radio	Medalaii	Palau Wave Radio	Music
T8??	91.5	ABC Radio Australia	Malakai	ABC Radio Australia	News/Talk

== History ==
Palau previously hosted two shortwave radio stations operated by World Harvest Radio International. These stations, known as Angel-3 (T8WH) and Angel-4 (T8BZ) transmitted Christian religious programming to areas in the Western Pacific, primarily China. These stations ceased operation on 27 October 2019.

ABC Radio Australia commenced operations in Palau in early 2024 in partnership with Eco Paradise FM, the government-operated station.
