= Leilani Reklai =

Palauan politician

Governor of Aimeliik
- Incumbent
- Assumed office 2007

Personal details
- Born: December 27, 1966
- Occupation: Politician; businesswoman; newspaper editor
- Known for: First female governor of Aimeliik; chairperson of the Palau National Communications Corporation; editor of the Island Times

Leilani Reklai (born December 27, 1966) is a Palauan politician and businesswoman. She has served as the chairperson of the board of directors of the Palau National Communications Corporation.

== Career ==
Leilani Reklai was tentatively elected the governor of the state of Aimeliik in the state elections of November 13, 2007. Early results showed Reklai leading her opponent and cousin, Abina Etpison, by just 35 votes. Reklai had 218 votes while Etpison, a Palauan legislator, had 183 votes. A total of 468 were cast in the Aimeliik election. 58 absentee ballots were still to be counted to determine the winner.

Leilani Reklai became the first female governor of Aimeliik and only the third female governor in Palau's history. Palau's other two women governors were Governor Vicky Kanai of Airai State and Governor Akiko Sugiyama of Ngardmau.

She became the editor of Palau's newspaper the Island Times In October 2024 she and her newspaper were sued by Surangel and Sons. Surangel and Sons are one of Palau's largest corporations and they alleged that they had been libelled in an article on 29 October.
