= Sha Merirei =

Palauan-American artist and activist

Sha Merirei is the handle used by Palauan-American artist and activist Sha Merirei Ongelungel. She was one of the earliest known Palauans to have an internet presence, promoting art, Palauan culture, and Palauan music in the late 1990s. In December 2014, she launched the first Palauan online radio station called Native ExPat Radio. That same month, she was named Miss LGBTQ by the Palau Humanities Project. She is the daughter of Palauan artist, Hans Ongelungel.

== #BeingMicronesian ==
In September 2018, Sha Merirei started a Twitter thread using the hashtag "#BeingMicronesian." The thread featured screenshots of anti-Micronesian sentiment, mainly from residents of Hawai'i, and was covered by a local news outlet. The news story captured some attention internationally, growing awareness of the Compacts of Free Association (COFA) and plight of Micronesians through outlets such as Radio New Zealand, Al Jazeera, The Guardian, and Associated Press. Around that same time, the Hawaii Advisory Committee to the U.S.Civil Rights Commission was conducting its second hearing on concerns associated with barriers to equal opportunities for Micronesians within the state. The hearings resulted in a report, published in October 2019, noting that "[t]here is widespread negative public perception of COFA migrants in Hawaii... This group continues to be scapegoated as a drain on resources, particularly in healthcare. COFA migrants also face discrimination in access to housing and employment."

== Other Activism ==
Sha Merirei's work covers a broad range of topics, which she connects to her primary themes of discussing Palau and Micronesia.

In November 2021, she participated in a panel discussion through the Shangri La Museum of Islamic Art, Culture and Design where she presented on the post-WWII political history of Micronesia. In the discussion, titled "Imperialism and a Hierarchy of Violence," Sha Merirei explained gave background on the Trust Territory of the Pacific Islands, the role the United States played in the difficulties present-day Micronesians are facing in Hawaii, and her frequent use of the term "compensatory domination." She proceeded to explain her work as such:

"The narrative has for all of us, the narrative has not been in our hands. They've told the stories about us and that's what gets into the mainstream, that's what gets in people's heads, and that's what people end up knowing about us. And it's horrible. But at the same time, we're the only people who can change that. And so the work that I'm doing with this group [Pasifika Uprising] is specifically about sharing those stories and making sure that not only people outside of our communities know, but that we understand our histories, because this is not stuff you learn in school. You're not going to learn Micronesian history and how, during the Kennedy administration, they issued a report to figure out a very specific way to get the Micronesian islands to kind of self-colonize. They had to look for a way to give them 'independence' without giving them full independence. And so through giving them money, created a dependence. And that's why we're in the situation we're in. And that was called the Solomon Report. And a lot of people don't know about that, just within the Micronesian community. I consider myself lucky to have been brought up by activists who are fighting U.S. imperialism when I was growing up, and, and because I had that background, and I know other people don't, the work that I've been doing with Pasifika Uprising is trying to make sure that we can get that information out to people. And I feel that's kind of how it needs to be, across the board, with not just the Micronesian groups, not just Pasifika, but all the different groups that are dealing with this all across the AAPI label and beyond. There's no reason why we can't take back that narrative."

In November 2021, she was featured in them magazine's "9 Activists and Educators to Follow for a Revolutionary View of Climate Justice" which was part of a series that looked at "how queer and trans folks are working to protect our planet through organizing, creative expression, and insurgent pedagogy." In the article, Sha Merirei explained her guiding principles behind her work: "My dad taught me that decolonization work that only focuses on your own community isn't true decolonization work and my aunt taught me that solidarity that's built on transactional relationships isn't true or lasting solidarity... When it comes to the climate crisis, which is deeply rooted in anti-Indigeneity, those are two of my major guiding principles.”

She also attended the 2021 United Nations Climate Change Conference (COP26) around that same time as part of the Feminist Peace Initiative town hall with MADRE and Global Justice Alliance. Sha Merirei spoke about colonization, explaining that "The Compacts of Free Association are treaties the U.S. has with the Republic of Palau, the Federated States of Micronesia & the Republic of the Marshall Islands - a not-so-subtle reminder that colonization isn't past tense, it's very real." She also spoke out about the impacts of military pollution and stated that "the islands across the Pacific have been the site of U.S. military operations and weapons testing, destroying ecosystems and harming indigenous communities." Sha Merirei further explained those impacts, saying "When the ocean is sick, the people are sick. When the planet is sick, the people are sick."

Ongelungel has been critical of the leadership in the United States and throughout the Pacific when it comes to their stance on issues of climate justice:

Let's set aside all the niceties and speak plainly on this: Even people in positions of power and authority are fully aware that nothing goes unscathed in the aftermath of creating and maintaining fossil fuel infrastructures... So whether you're trying to reopen the Palau National Marine Sanctuary for commercial fishing and potential exploratory drilling or in the United States pushing to resume oil and gas leasing on public lands, the only safe inference is that our leaders are dishonest and hungry for more money and more power. And that is wholly unconscionable. What’s legal isn’t always ethical and too many leaders, the world over, are demonstrating this with their utter disregard for their communities and the climate. Frankly, I'm embarrassed for these so-called leaders. For all their power and authority, they will never have the true power and solidarity needed to lead us into a safer future like grassroots movements.

Sha Merirei speaks frequently on Pasifika and her identity as a Micronesian (Palauan), "The narrative of shame that's placed on our sexualities is not from my foremothers, but from the colonial mindset that sought to oppress them."
