= Environment of Palau =

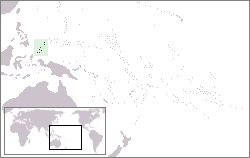
Palau is to the north of Australia and to the southeast of the Philippines.

The environment of Palau consists of a number of islands in the western Pacific Ocean.

== Biota ==
The avifauna of Palau includes a total of 149 species, of which 10 are endemic, three have been introduced by humans, and 17 are rare or accidental. Three species are globally threatened.

== Climate ==
The Palau government are concerned about the effects of climate change on the island nation. In 2008 Palau requested that the UN Security Council consider protection against rising sea levels due to climate change.

Tommy Remengesau, the president of Palau, has said:

Palau has lost at least one third of its coral reefs due to climate change related weather patterns. We also lost most of our agricultural production due to drought and extreme high tides. These are not theoretical, scientific losses -- they are the losses of our resources and our livelihoods.... For island states, time is not running out. It has run out. And our path may very well be the window to your own future and the future of our planet.

== Geography ==
Palau consists of eight principal islands and more than 250 smaller ones lying roughly 500 miles southeast of the Philippines. The islands of Palau constitute part of the Caroline Islands chain.

== See also ==
- List of environmental issues
