= List of airports in Palau =

This is a list of airports in Palau, sorted by location.

The Republic of Palau (Palauan: Beluu er a Belau), is an island nation in the Pacific Ocean. It emerged from United Nations trusteeship (administered by the United States) in 1994. It is one of the world's youngest and smallest sovereign states. In English, the name is sometimes spelled Belau in accordance with the native pronunciation.

== Airports ==
Airport names shown in bold indicate the airport has scheduled service on commercial airlines.

State	Island	ICAO	IATA	FAA	Airport name	Coordinates
Airai	Babeldaob (Babelthuap)	PTRO	ROR	ROR	**Palau International Airport** (Roman Tmetuchl International Airport)	07°22′02″N 134°32′39″E
Angaur	Angaur			ANG	**Angaur Airstrip**	06°54′23″N 134°08′42″E
Peleliu	Peleliu			C23	**Peleliu Airfield**	06°59′54″N 134°13′58″E

== See also ==
- Transport in Palau
- List of airports by ICAO code: P#PT - Federated States of Micronesia, Palau
- Wikipedia:WikiProject Aviation/Airline destination lists: Oceania#Palau
