= Religion in Palau =

Christianity is the dominant religion in Palau, practiced by around 72.8% of the total population, according to the 2022 census. Freedom of religion is enshrined in Palau's constitution.

== Demographics ==
Religion in Palau (estimation 2022).
1. Roman Catholicism (46.9%)
2. Protestantism (25.9%)
3. Modekngei/Indigenous religion (5.10%)
4. Seventh-day Adventist (5.00%)
5. Islam/Muslims (4.90%)
6. Others (12.3%)

According to the 2020 census, 46.9% of the population is Roman Catholic, 25.9% Protestant (primarily Evangelical), 5.0% Seventh-day Adventist, 5.1% Modekngei, 4.9% Muslim, 0.9% The Church of Jesus Christ of Latter-day Saints, and 11.4% other religions.

In the 2015 census, of the population of 13,300 people over 18, 45.3% are members of the Roman Catholic Church. Other Christian groups were Evangelicals at 26.4%; Seventh-day Adventists at 6.9%; The Church of Jesus Christ of Latter-day Saints (Mormons) at 1.5%; Assembly of God at 0.9%; and Baptists at 0.7%. Modekngei, which embraces both animist and Christian beliefs and is unique to the country, has 5.7% of the population. Muslims made up about 3.0% of the population. Other which includes everyone not in the religions above as well as the non-religious were about 11.2% of the population.

In 2020, about 0.85% of the population was estimated to be Buddhist, 0.7% practiced the Baháʼí Faith and 0.25% was reported to be practicing elements of Chinese folk religion, alongside 0.5% following other traditional religions, 2% following Islam, 0.1% practicing Hinduism, and almost 5% identifying as agnostic or atheist.

In 2022, there is a primarily Filipino Catholic expatriate community of over 3,000 people.

== History ==
Foreign missionaries were active since the arrival of Jesuit priests in the early 19th century, to the start of the 21st century. During the Japanese mandate, Japanese Christian missions were heavily subsidized; Japan's native Buddhists were given a comparative pittance. Japanese rule brought Mahayana Buddhism and Shinto to Palau, with the syncretism of the two being the majority religion among Japanese settlers. However, following Japan's World War II defeat, the remaining Japanese largely converted to Christianity, while the remainder continued to observe Buddhism, but stopped practicing Shinto rites. In the early 2000s, the Seventh-day Adventist and Evangelical churches had missionaries teaching in their respective elementary and high schools. There are also approximately 400 Bengali Muslims in Palau, and recently a few Uyghurs detained in Guantanamo Bay were allowed to settle in the island nation. There are two mosques in Palau, one of which is located in Koror.

== Religious freedom ==
The constitution of Palau establishes the freedom of religion and prohibits the government from taking any action to infringe upon it. It also states that the country has no state religion.

Religious groups can obtain charters as (NGOs) from the registrar of corporations at the Office of the Attorney General; this involves a filing fee of $250, but registered groups are exempt from paying tax.

Religious instruction is prohibited in public schools, but religious groups are allowed to request government funds to run private schools.

== See also ==
- Roman Catholic Diocese of Caroline Islands
- History of the Jews in Palau
- The Church of Jesus Christ of Latter-day Saints in Palau
