= Mount Ngerchelchuus =

Mountain in Palau

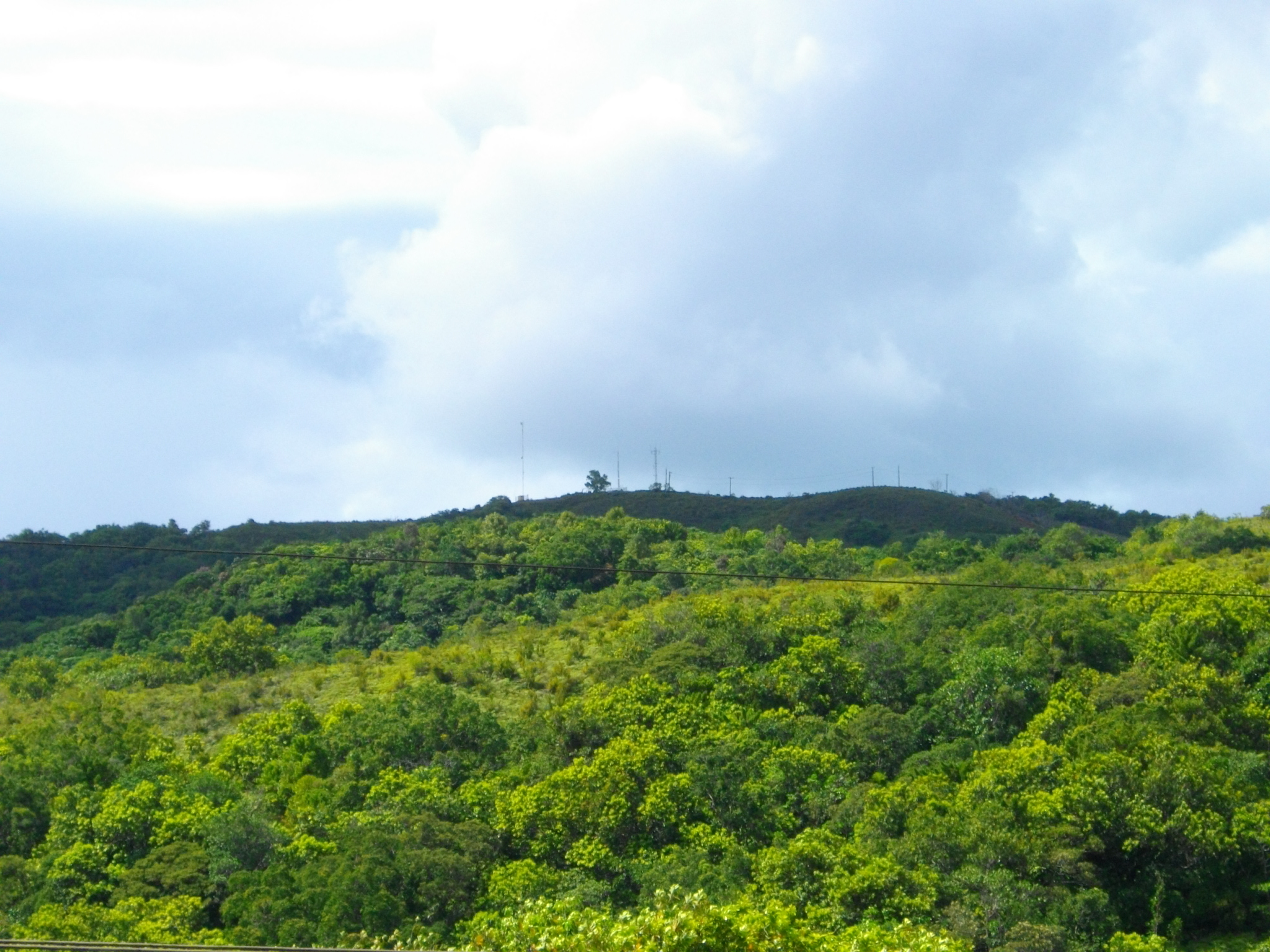
- Mount Ngerchelchuus

Highest point
- Elevation: 242 m (794 ft)
- Prominence: 242 m (794 ft)
- Listing: Country high point
- Coordinates: 7°33′55″N 134°34′10″E

Geography
- Location within Palau
- Location: Babeldaob, Palau

Mount Ngerchelchuus is the Republic of Palau's highest point, located at the border of the states of Ngardmau and Ngaremlengui, on the island of Babeldaob.
