= List of birds of Palau =

This is a list of the bird species recorded in Palau. The avifauna of Palau include a total of 186 species, of which 12 are endemic, and 5 have been introduced by humans. 9 species are globally threatened.

This list's taxonomic treatment (designation and sequence of orders, families and species) and nomenclature (common and scientific names) follow the conventions of The Clements Checklist of Birds of the World, 2022 edition. The family accounts at the beginning of each heading reflect this taxonomy, as do the species counts found in each family account. Introduced and accidental species are included in the total counts for Palau.

The following tags have been used to highlight several categories. The commonly occurring native species do not fall into any of these categories.

- (A) Accidental - a species that rarely or accidentally occurs in Palau
- (E) Endemic - a species endemic to Palau
- (I) Introduced - a species introduced to Palau as a consequence, direct or indirect, of human actions
- (Ex) Extirpated - a species that no longer occurs in Palau although populations exist elsewhere

== Ducks, geese, and waterfowl ==
Order: Anseriformes Family: Anatidae

Anatidae includes the ducks and most duck-like waterfowl, such as geese and swans. These birds are adapted to an aquatic existence with webbed feet, flattened bills, and feathers that are excellent at shedding water due to an oily coating.

- Garganey, Spatula querquedula
- Eurasian wigeon, Mareca penelope
- Pacific black duck, Anas superciliosa
- Northern pintail, Anas acuta
- Green-winged teal, Anas crecca
- Common pochard, Aythya ferina (A)
- Tufted duck, Aythya fuligula

== Megapodes ==
Order: Galliformes Family: Megapodiidae

The Megapodiidae are stocky, medium-large chicken-like birds with small heads and large feet. All but the malleefowl occupy jungle habitats and most have brown or black colouring.

- Micronesian scrubfowl, Megapodius laperouse

== Pheasants, grouse, and allies ==
Order: Galliformes Family: Phasianidae

The Phasianidae are a family of terrestrial birds which consists of quails, partridges, snowcocks, francolins, spurfowls, tragopans, monals, pheasants, peafowls and jungle fowls. In general, they are plump (although they vary in size) and have broad, relatively short wings.

- Red junglefowl, Gallus gallus (I)

== Pigeons and doves ==
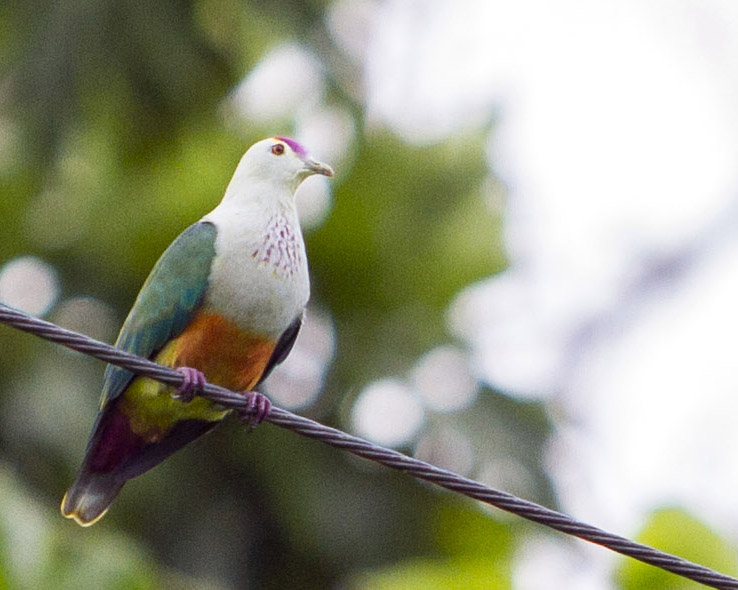
Palau fruit-dove

Order: Columbiformes Family: Columbidae

Pigeons and doves are stout-bodied birds with short necks and short slender bills with a fleshy cere.

- Palau ground dove, Alopecoenas canifrons (E)
- Nicobar pigeon, Caloenas nicobarica
- Palau fruit-dove, Ptilinopus pelewensis (E)
- Micronesian imperial-pigeon, Ducula oceanica

== Cuckoos ==
Order: Cuculiformes Family: Cuculidae

The family Cuculidae includes cuckoos, roadrunners and anis. These birds are of variable size with slender bodies, long tails and strong legs. The Old World cuckoos are brood parasites.

- Chestnut-winged cuckoo, Clamator coromandus (A)
- Long-tailed koel, Urodynamis taitensis (A)
- Channel-billed cuckoo, Scythrops novaehollandiae (A)
- Brush cuckoo, Cacomantis variolosus (A)
- Northern hawk-cuckoo, Hierococcyx hyperythrus (A)
- Hodgson's hawk-cuckoo, Hierococcyx nisicolor (A)
- Common cuckoo, Cuculus canorus (A)
- Oriental cuckoo, Cuculus optatus

== Nightjars and allies ==
Order: Caprimulgiformes Family: Caprimulgidae

Nightjars are medium-sized nocturnal birds that usually nest on the ground. They have long wings, short legs and very short bills. Most have small feet, of little use for walking, and long pointed wings. Their soft plumage is camouflaged to resemble bark or leaves.

- Gray nightjar, Caprimulgus jotaka
- Palau nightjar, Caprimulgus phalaena (E)

== Swifts ==
Order: Caprimulgiformes Family: Apodidae

Swifts are small birds which spend the majority of their lives flying. These birds have very short legs and never settle voluntarily on the ground, perching instead only on vertical surfaces. Many swifts have long swept-back wings which resemble a crescent or boomerang.

- White-throated needletail, Hirundapus caudacutus (A)
- Palau swiftlet, Aerodramus pelewensis (E)
- Pacific swift, Apus pacificus (A)

== Rails, gallinules, and coots ==
Order: Gruiformes Family: Rallidae

Rallidae is a large family of small to medium-sized birds which includes the rails, crakes, coots and gallinules. Typically they inhabit dense vegetation in damp environments near lakes, swamps or rivers. In general they are shy and secretive birds, making them difficult to observe. Most species have strong legs and long toes which are well adapted to soft uneven surfaces. They tend to have short, rounded wings and to be weak fliers.

- Buff-banded rail, Gallirallus philippensis
- Eurasian moorhen, Gallinula chloropus
- Eurasian coot, Fulica atra (A)
- Black-backed swamphen, Porphyrio indicus
- Australasian swamphen, Porphyrio melanotus
- White-breasted waterhen, Amaurornis phoenicurus (A)
- Pale-vented bush-hen, Amaurornis moluccana (A)
- White-browed crake, Poliolimnas cinereus
- Red-legged crake, Rallina fasciata (A)
- Slaty-legged crake, Rallina eurizonoides

== Stilts and avocets ==
Order: Charadriiformes Family: Recurvirostridae

Recurvirostridae is a family of large wading birds, which includes the avocets and stilts. The avocets have long legs and long up-curved bills. The stilts have extremely long legs and long, thin, straight bills.

- Black-winged stilt, Himantopus himantopus
- Pied stilt, Himantopus leucocephalus (A)
- Black-necked stilt, Himantopus mexicanus

== Plovers and lapwings ==
Order: Charadriiformes Family: Charadriidae

The family Charadriidae includes the plovers, dotterels and lapwings. They are small to medium-sized birds with compact bodies, short, thick necks and long, usually pointed, wings. They are found in open country worldwide, mostly in habitats near water.

- Black-bellied plover, Pluvialis squatarola
- Pacific golden-plover, Pluvialis fulva
- Lesser sand-plover, Charadrius mongolus
- Greater sand-plover, Charadrius leschenaultii
- Kentish plover, Charadrius alexandrinus
- Common ringed plover, Charadrius hiaticula
- Little ringed plover, Charadrius dubius
- Oriental plover, Charadrius veredus (A)
- Red-kneed dotterel, Erythrogonys cinctus (A)

== Sandpipers and allies ==
Order: Charadriiformes Family: Scolopacidae

Scolopacidae is a large diverse family of small to medium-sized shorebirds including the sandpipers, curlews, godwits, shanks, tattlers, woodcocks, snipes, dowitchers and phalaropes. The majority of these species eat small invertebrates picked out of the mud or soil. Variation in length of legs and bills enables multiple species to feed in the same habitat, particularly on the coast, without direct competition for food.

- Whimbrel, Numenius phaeopus
- Little curlew, Numenius minutus (A)
- Far Eastern curlew, Numenius madagascariensis
- Eurasian curlew, Numenius arquata (A)
- Bar-tailed godwit, Limosa lapponica
- Black-tailed godwit, Limosa limosa
- Ruddy turnstone, Arenaria interpres
- Great knot, Calidris tenuirostris
- Red knot, Calidris canutus (A)
- Ruff, Calidris pugnax
- Broad-billed sandpiper, Calidris falcinellus (A)
- Sharp-tailed sandpiper, Calidris acuminata
- Curlew sandpiper, Calidris ferruginea
- Temminck's stint, Calidris temminckii (A)
- Long-toed stint, Calidris subminuta
- Red-necked stint, Calidris ruficollis
- Sanderling, Calidris alba
- Dunlin, Calidris alpina
- Little stint, Calidris minuta (A)
- Pectoral sandpiper, Calidris melanotos
- Asian dowitcher, Limnodromus semipalmatus (A)
- Common snipe, Gallinago gallinago (A)
- Swinhoe's snipe, Gallinago megala
- Terek sandpiper, Xenus cinereus
- Red-necked phalarope, Phalaropus lobatus (A)
- Common sandpiper, Actitis hypoleucos
- Green sandpiper, Tringa ochropus (A)
- Gray-tailed tattler, Tringa brevipes
- Wandering tattler, Tringa incana
- Common greenshank, Tringa nebularia
- Marsh sandpiper, Tringa stagnatilis
- Wood sandpiper, Tringa glareola
- Common redshank, Tringa totanus

== Pratincoles and coursers ==
Order: Charadriiformes Family: Glareolidae

Glareolidae is a family of wading birds comprising the pratincoles, which have short legs, long pointed wings and long forked tails, and the coursers, which have long legs, short wings and long pointed bills which curve downwards.

- Oriental pratincole, Glareola maldivarum

== Skuas and jaegers ==
Order: Charadriiformes Family: Stercorariidae

The family Stercorariidae are, in general, medium to large birds, typically with grey or brown plumage, often with white markings on the wings. They nest on the ground in temperate and arctic regions and are long-distance migrants.

- Pomarine jaeger, Stercorarius pomarinus (A)
- Long-tailed jaeger, Stercorarius longicaudus

== Gulls, terns, and skimmers ==
Order: Charadriiformes Family: Laridae

Laridae is a family of medium to large seabirds, the gulls, terns, and skimmers. Gulls are typically grey or white, often with black markings on the head or wings. They have stout, longish bills and webbed feet. Terns are a group of generally medium to large seabirds typically with grey or white plumage, often with black markings on the head. Most terns hunt fish by diving but some pick insects off the surface of fresh water. Terns are generally long-lived birds, with several species known to live in excess of 30 years.

- Black-headed gull, Chroicocephalus ridibundus
- Brown noddy, Anous stolidus
- Black noddy, Anous minutus
- White tern, Gygis alba
- Sooty tern, Onychoprion fuscatus
- Gray-backed tern, Onychoprion lunatus
- Bridled tern, Onychoprion anaethetus
- Little tern, Sternula albifrons
- Gull-billed tern, Gelochelidon nilotica (A)
- White-winged tern, Chlidonias leucopterus
- Whiskered tern, Chlidonias hybrida
- Black-naped tern, Sterna sumatrana
- Common tern, Sterna hirundo
- Great crested tern, Thalasseus bergii

== Tropicbirds ==
Order: Phaethontiformes Family: Phaethontidae

Tropicbirds are slender white birds of tropical oceans, with exceptionally long central tail feathers. Their heads and long wings have black markings.

- White-tailed tropicbird, Phaethon lepturus
- Red-tailed tropicbird, Phaethon rubricauda

== Northern storm-petrels ==
Order: Procellariiformes Family: Hydrobatidae

The northern storm-petrels are relatives of the petrels and are the smallest seabirds. They feed on planktonic crustaceans and small fish picked from the surface, typically while hovering. The flight is fluttering and sometimes bat-like.

- Matsudaira's storm-petrel, Hydrobates matsudairae

== Shearwaters and petrels ==
Order: Procellariiformes Family: Procellariidae

The procellariids are the main group of medium-sized "true petrels", characterised by united nostrils with medium septum and a long outer functional primary.

- Providence petrel, Pterodroma solandri
- Bulwer's petrel, Bulweria bulwerii
- Streaked shearwater, Calonectris leucomelas
- Wedge-tailed shearwater, Ardenna pacificus
- Tropical shearwater, Puffinus bailloni

== Frigatebirds ==
Order: Suliformes Family: Fregatidae

Frigatebirds are large seabirds usually found over tropical oceans. They are large, black and white or completely black, with long wings and deeply forked tails. The males have coloured inflatable throat pouches. They do not swim or walk and cannot take off from a flat surface. Having the largest wingspan-to-body-weight ratio of any bird, they are essentially aerial, able to stay aloft for more than a week.

- Lesser frigatebird, Fregata ariel
- Great frigatebird, Fregata minor

== Boobies and gannets ==
Order: Suliformes Family: Sulidae

The sulids comprise the gannets and boobies. Both groups are medium to large coastal seabirds that plunge-dive for fish.

- Masked booby, Sula dactylatra
- Brown booby, Sula leucogaster
- Red-footed booby, Sula sula

== Cormorants and shags ==
Order: Suliformes Family: Phalacrocoracidae

Phalacrocoracidae is a family of medium to large coastal, fish-eating seabirds that includes cormorants and shags. Plumage colouration varies, with the majority having mainly dark plumage, some species being black-and-white and a few being colourful.

- Little pied cormorant, Microcarbo melanoleucos
- Great cormorant, Phalacrocorax carbo (A)
- Little black cormorant, Phalacrocorax sulcirostris (A)

== Pelicans ==
Order: Pelecaniformes Family: Pelecanidae

Pelicans are large water birds with a distinctive pouch under their beak. As with other members of the order Pelecaniformes, they have webbed feet with four toes.

- Australian pelican, Pelecanus conspicillatus (A)

== Herons, egrets, and bitterns ==
Order: Pelecaniformes Family: Ardeidae

The family Ardeidae contains the bitterns, herons, and egrets. Herons and egrets are medium to large wading birds with long necks and legs. Bitterns tend to be shorter necked and more wary. Members of Ardeidae fly with their necks retracted, unlike other long-necked birds such as storks, ibises and spoonbills.

- Yellow bittern, Ixobrychus sinensis
- Schrenck's bittern, Ixobrychus eurhythmus (A)
- Gray heron, Ardea cinerea (A)
- Great egret, Ardea alba
- Intermediate egret, Ardea intermedia
- Little egret, Egretta garzetta
- Pacific reef-heron, Egretta sacra
- Cattle egret, Bubulcus ibis
- Chinese pond-heron, Ardeola bacchus (A)
- Striated heron, Butorides striata
- Black-crowned night-heron, Nycticorax nycticorax
- Nankeen night-heron, Nycticorax caledonicus
- Japanese night-heron, Gorsachius goisagi (A)
- Malayan night-heron, Gorsachius melanolophus (A)

== Ibises and spoonbills ==
Order: Pelecaniformes Family: Threskiornithidae

Threskiornithidae is a family of large terrestrial and wading birds which includes the ibises and spoonbills. They have long, broad wings with 11 primary and about 20 secondary feathers. They are strong fliers and despite their size and weight, very capable soarers.

- Glossy ibis, Plegadis falcinellus (A)
- Black-faced spoonbill, Platalea minor (A)

== Osprey ==
Order: Accipitriformes Family: Pandionidae

The family Pandionidae contains only one species, the osprey. The osprey is a medium-large raptor which is a specialist fish-eater with a worldwide distribution.

- Osprey, Pandion haliaetus

== Hawks, eagles, and kites ==
Order: Accipitriformes Family: Accipitridae

Accipitridae is a family of birds of prey, which includes hawks, eagles, kites, harriers and Old World vultures. These birds have powerful hooked beaks for tearing flesh from their prey, strong legs, powerful talons and keen eyesight.

- Gray-faced buzzard, Butastur indicus (A)
- Chinese sparrowhawk, Accipiter soloensis
- Black kite, Milvus migrans
- Brahminy kite, Haliastur indus (A)

== Owls ==
Order: Strigiformes Family: Strigidae

The typical owls are small to large solitary nocturnal birds of prey. They have large forward-facing eyes and ears, a hawk-like beak and a conspicuous circle of feathers around each eye called a facial disk.

- Palau owl, Pyrroglaux podarginus (E)

== Kingfishers ==
Order: Coraciiformes Family: Alcedinidae

Kingfishers are medium-sized birds with large heads, long pointed bills, short legs and stubby tails.

- Common kingfisher, Alcedo atthis (A)
- Ruddy kingfisher, Halcyon coromanda (A)
- Palau kingfisher, Todirhamphus pelewensis (E)
- Sacred kingfisher, Todirhamphus sanctus (A)
- Collared kingfisher, Todirhamphus chloris

== Bee-eaters ==
Order: Coraciiformes Family: Meropidae

The bee-eaters are a group of near passerine birds in the family Meropidae. Most species are found in Africa but others occur in southern Europe, Madagascar, Australia and New Guinea. They are characterised by richly coloured plumage, slender bodies and usually elongated central tail feathers. All are colourful and have long downturned bills and pointed wings, which give them a swallow-like appearance when seen from afar.

- Rainbow bee-eater, Merops ornatus (A)

== Rollers ==
Order: Coraciiformes Family: Coraciidae

Rollers resemble crows in size and build, but are more closely related to the kingfishers and bee-eaters. They share the colourful appearance of those groups with blues and browns predominating. The two inner front toes are connected, but the outer toe is not.

- Dollarbird, Eurystomus orientalis

== Falcons and caracaras ==
Order: Falconiformes Family: Falconidae

Falconidae is a family of diurnal birds of prey. They differ from hawks, eagles and kites in that they kill with their beaks instead of their talons.

- Peregrine falcon, Falco peregrinus

== Cockatoos ==
Order: Psittaciformes Family: Cacatuidae

The cockatoos share many features with other parrots including the characteristic curved beak shape and a zygodactyl foot, with two forward toes and two backwards toes. They differ, however in a number of characteristics, including the often spectacular movable headcrest. .

- Sulphur-crested cockatoo, Cacatua galerita (I)

== Old World parrots ==
Order: Psittaciformes Family: Psittaculidae

Characteristic features of parrots include a strong curved bill, an upright stance, strong legs, and clawed zygodactyl feet. Many parrots are vividly coloured, and some are multi-coloured. In size they range from 8 cm (3.1 in) to 1 m (3.3 ft) in length. Old World parrots are found from Africa east across south and southeast Asia and Oceania to Australia and New Zealand.

- Eclectus parrot, Eclectus roratus (I)

== Honeyeaters ==
Order: Passeriformes Family: Meliphagidae

The honeyeaters are a large and diverse family of small to medium-sized birds most common in Australia and New Guinea. They are nectar feeders and closely resemble other nectar-feeding passerines.

- Micronesian myzomela, Myzomela rubratra

== Cuckooshrikes ==
Order: Passeriformes Family: Campephagidae

The cuckooshrikes are small to medium-sized passerine birds. They are predominantly greyish with white and black, although some species are brightly coloured.

- Palau cicadabird, Edolisoma monacha (E)

== Whistlers and allies ==
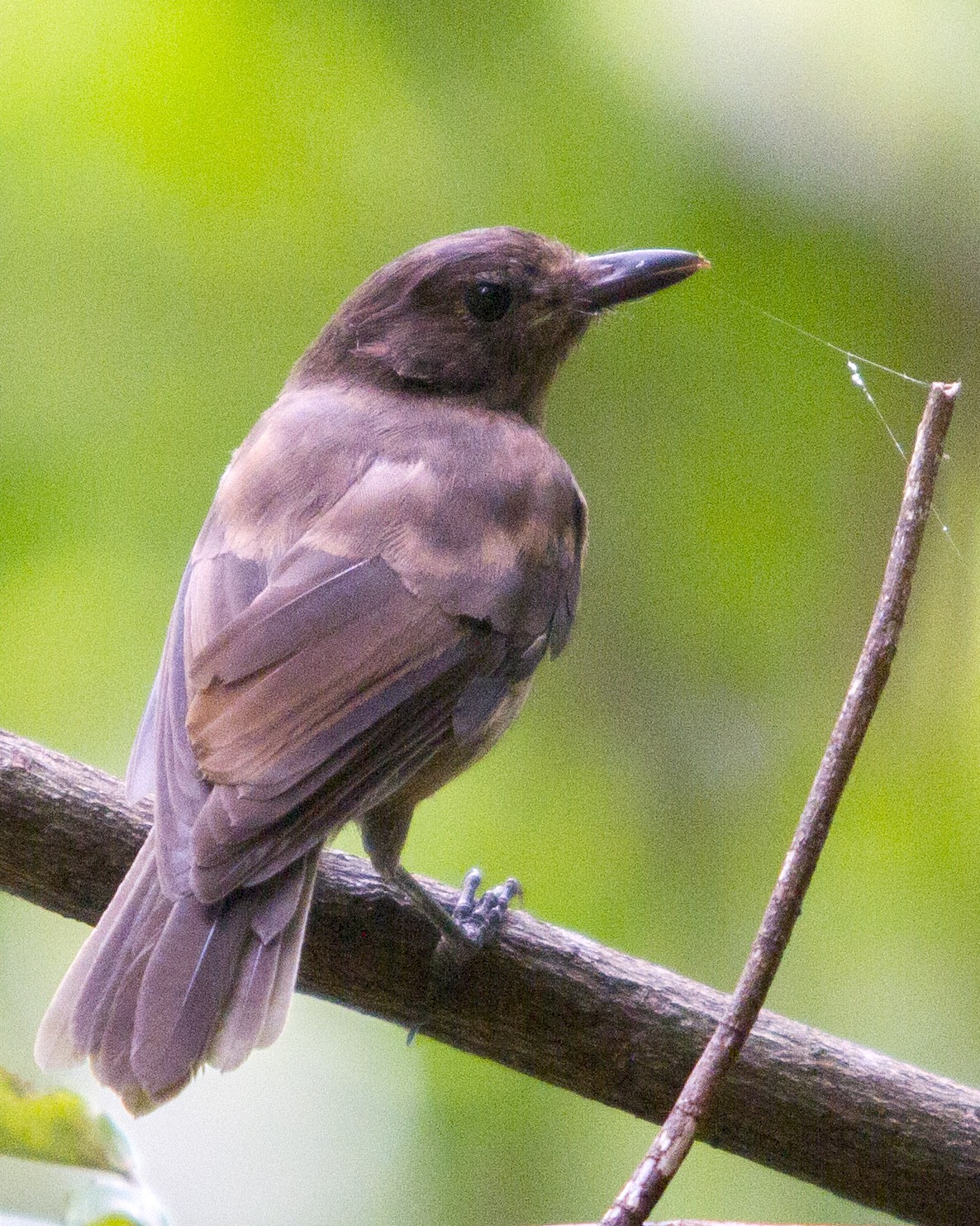
Morningbird

Order: Passeriformes Family: Pachycephalidae

The family Pachycephalidae includes the whistlers, shrikethrushes, and some of the pitohuis.

- Morningbird, Pachycephala tenebrosa (E)

== Woodswallows, bellmagpies, and allies ==
Order: Passeriformes Family: Artamidae

The woodswallows are soft-plumaged, somber-coloured passerine birds. They are smooth, agile flyers with moderately large, semi-triangular wings.

- White-breasted woodswallow, Artamus leucorynchus

== Fantails ==
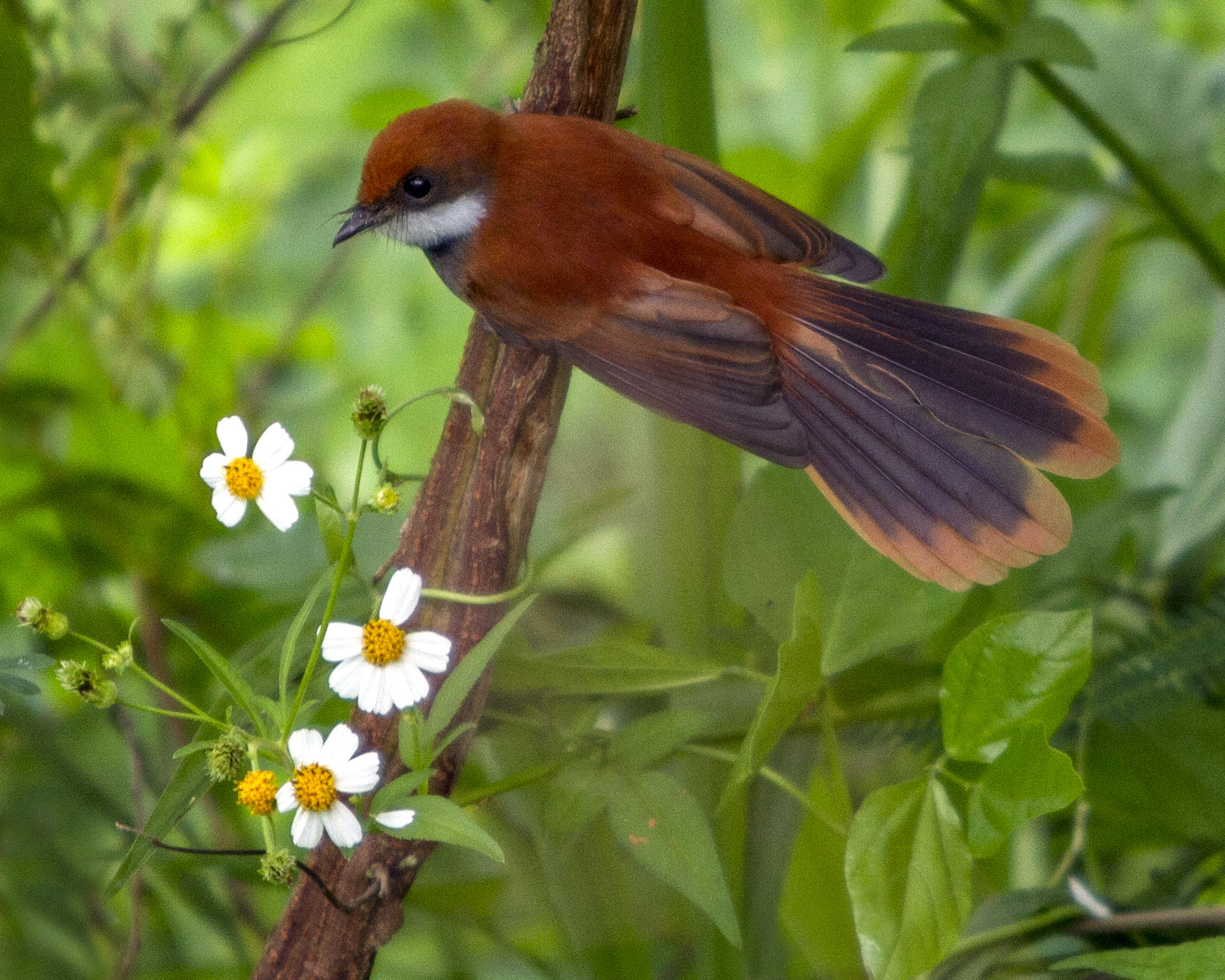
Palau fantail

Order: Passeriformes Family: Rhipiduridae

The fantails are small insectivorous birds which are specialist aerial feeders.

- Palau fantail, Rhipidura lepida (E)

== Monarch flycatchers ==
Order: Passeriformes Family: Monarchidae

The monarch flycatchers are small to medium-sized insectivorous passerines which hunt by flycatching.

- Palau flycatcher, Myiagra erythrops (E)

== Shrikes ==
Order: Passeriformes Family: Laniidae

Shrikes are passerine birds known for their habit of catching other birds and small animals and impaling the uneaten portions of their bodies on thorns. A typical shrike's beak is hooked, like a bird of prey.

- Brown shrike, Lanius cristatus (A)

== Reed warblers and allies ==
Order: Passeriformes Family: Acrocephalidae

The members of this family are usually rather large for "warblers". Most are rather plain olivaceous brown above with much yellow to beige below. They are usually found in open woodland, reedbeds, or tall grass. The family occurs mostly in southern to western Eurasia and surroundings, but it also ranges far into the Pacific, with some species in Africa.

- Oriental reed warbler, Acrocephalus orientalis (A)

== Grassbirds and allies ==
Order: Passeriformes Family: Locustellidae

Locustellidae are a family of small insectivorous songbirds found mainly in Eurasia, Africa, and the Australian region. They are smallish birds with tails that are usually long and pointed, and tend to be drab brownish or buffy all over.

- Lanceolated warbler, Locustella lanceolata (A)

== Swallows ==
Order: Passeriformes Family: Hirundinidae

The family Hirundinidae is adapted to aerial feeding. They have a slender streamlined body, long pointed wings and a short bill with a wide gape. The feet are adapted to perching rather than walking, and the front toes are partially joined at the base.

- Bank swallow, Riparia riparia (A)
- Barn swallow, Hirundo rustica
- Red-rumped swallow, Cecropis daurica (A)
- Asian house-martin, Delichon dasypus (A)

== Bush warblers and allies ==
Order: Passeriformes Family: Scotocercidae

The members of this family are found throughout Africa, Asia, and Polynesia. Their taxonomy is in flux, and some authorities place some genera in other families.

- Palau bush warbler, Horornis annae (E)

== White-eyes, yuhinas, and allies ==
Order: Passeriformes Family: Zosteropidae

The white-eyes are small and mostly undistinguished, their plumage above being generally some dull colour like greenish-olive, but some species have a white or bright yellow throat, breast or lower parts, and several have buff flanks. As their name suggests, many species have a white ring around each eye.

- Giant white-eye, Megazosterops palauensis (E)
- Caroline Islands white-eye, Zosterops semperi
- Dusky white-eye, Zosterops finschii (E)

== Starlings ==
Order: Passeriformes Family: Sturnidae

Starlings are small to medium-sized passerine birds. Their flight is strong and direct and they are very gregarious. Their preferred habitat is fairly open country. They eat insects and fruit. Plumage is typically dark with a metallic sheen.

- Micronesian starling, Aplonis opaca
- Chestnut-cheeked starling, Agropsar philippensis (A)

== Thrushes and allies ==
Order: Passeriformes Family: Turdidae

The thrushes are a group of passerine birds that occur mainly in the Old World. They are plump, soft plumaged, small to medium-sized insectivores or sometimes omnivores, often feeding on the ground. Many have attractive songs.

- Scaly thrush, Zoothera dauma (A)
- Eyebrowed thrush, Turdus obscurus (A)

== Old World flycatchers ==
Order: Passeriformes Family: Muscicapidae

Old World flycatchers are a large group of small passerine birds native to the Old World. They are mainly small arboreal insectivores. The appearance of these birds is highly varied, but they mostly have weak songs and harsh calls.

- Gray-streaked flycatcher, Muscicapa griseisticta
- Blue-and-white flycatcher, Cyanoptila cyanomelana (A)
- Siberian rubythroat, Calliope calliope (A)
- Narcissus flycatcher, Ficedula narcissina (A)
- Blue rock-thrush, Monticola solitarius (A)
- Isabelline wheatear, Oenanthe isabellina (A)

== Waxbills and allies ==
Order: Passeriformes Family: Estrildidae

The estrildid finches are small passerine birds of the Old World tropics and Australasia. They are gregarious and often colonial seed eaters with short thick but pointed bills. They are all similar in structure and habits, but have wide variation in plumage colours and patterns.

- Blue-faced parrotfinch, Erythrura trichroa
- Scaly-breasted munia, Lonchura punctulata (Ex)
- Chestnut munia, Lonchura atricapilla (I)

== Old World sparrows ==
Order: Passeriformes Family: Passeridae

Old World sparrows are small passerine birds. In general, sparrows tend to be small, plump, brown or grey birds with short tails and short powerful beaks. Sparrows are seed eaters, but they also consume small insects.

- Eurasian tree sparrow, Passer montanus (I)

== Wagtails and pipits ==
Order: Passeriformes Family: Motacillidae

Motacillidae is a family of small passerine birds with medium to long tails. They include the wagtails, longclaws and pipits. They are slender, ground feeding insectivores of open country.

- Gray wagtail, Motacilla cinerea (A)
- Eastern yellow wagtail, Motacilla tschutschensis
- White wagtail, Motacilla alba (A)
- Blyth's pipit, Anthus godlewskii (A)
- Olive-backed pipit, Anthus hodgsoni (A)
- Red-throated pipit, Anthus cervinus (A)

== Old World buntings ==
Order: Passeriformes Family: Emberizidae

The emberizids are a large family of passerine birds. They are seed-eating birds with distinctively shaped bills. Many emberizid species have distinctive head patterns.

- Black-headed bunting, Emberiza melanocephala (A)
- Little bunting, Emberiza pusilla (A)

== See also ==
- List of birds
- Lists of birds by region
