= Telecommunications in Palau =

Overview of telecommunication systems and infrastructure in Palau

== Telephones ==
Telephones - main lines in use: 7,300 (2012)

Telephones - mobile cellular: 17,150 (2012)

Telephone system:
domestic: Palau National Communications Corporation
international: satellite earth station - 1 Intelsat (Pacific Ocean)

== Radio and television ==
Radio broadcast stations: AM 1, FM 3, shortwave 1 (2002)

- List of radio stations in Palau

Radios: 12,000 (1997)

Television broadcast stations: None, cable and satellite networks provide television service.

Televisions: 11,000 (1997)

== Internet ==
Internet service providers (ISPs): PNCC (Formally PalauNet)

Country code (Top level domain): PW
