= Constitution of Palau =

Supreme law of the Republic of Palau

The Constitution of Palau, Constitution of the Republic of Palau (Palauan: Uchetemel a llach er a beluu er a Belau) was adopted by the Palau Constitutional Convention from January 28 to April 2, 1979, ratified at the Third Constitution Referendum on July 9, 1980, and entered into force January 1, 1981.

There were disagreements between the United States and Palau about the constitution's provisions outlawing nuclear power, nuclear weapons, nuclear waste, and a foreign power's exercise of eminent domain in Palau.

The Second Constitutional Convention certifies the proposed amendments to the Constitution of the Republic of Palau that were duly adopted by majority vote of the Delegates on July 15, 2005.
