= Foreign relations of Palau =

Palau gained its independence October 1, 1994 with the entry into force of the Compact of Free Association with the United States. Palau was the last Trust Territory of the Pacific Islands territories to gain its independence. Under the Compact, the U.S. remains responsible for Palau's defense for 50 years.

Palau is a sovereign nation and conducts its own foreign relations.

Palau was admitted to the United Nations on December 15, 1994, and has since joined several other international organizations. In 2004, Stuart Beck was appointed to serve as Palau's first permanent representative to the United Nations. Along with the other former Trust Territories, Palau is one of a handful of countries that regularly votes with Israel in the United Nations General Assembly.

== Diplomatic relations ==
List of countries which Palau maintains diplomatic relations with:

#	Country	Date
1	Australia	1 October 1994
2	Federated States of Micronesia	1 October 1994
3	Papua New Guinea	1 October 1994
4	United States	1 October 1994
5	Israel	2 October 1994
6	Nauru	14 October 1994
7	Japan	2 November 1994
8	New Zealand	2 December 1994
9	South Korea	22 March 1995
10	India	10 April 1995
11	Kiribati	12 July 1995
12	Spain	3 August 1995
13	Sweden	9 August 1995
14	Portugal	17 May 1996
15	United Kingdom	16 August 1996
16	Netherlands	21 April 1997
17	Thailand	13 May 1997
18	Philippines	15 July 1997
19	Canada	25 August 1997
20	Germany	11 November 1997
21	France	25 November 1997
22	Marshall Islands	1 August 1998
—	Holy See	17 December 1998
23	Singapore	30 September 1999
24	Chile	24 November 1999
—	Taiwan	29 December 1999
25	Ireland	14 July 2000
26	Switzerland	31 August 2001
27	Mexico	17 October 2001
28	Italy	22 March 2002
29	Timor-Leste	16 August 2002
30	Czech Republic	17 September 2003
31	Greece	2 June 2004
32	Argentina	6 July 2004
33	South Africa	24 August 2004
34	Iceland	6 October 2004
35	Austria	16 November 2004
36	Brazil	31 January 2005
37	Qatar	17 February 2005
38	Turkey	2 May 2006
39	Russia	28 November 2006
40	Indonesia	6 July 2007
41	Slovakia	24 September 2007
42	Vietnam	18 August 2008
—	Kosovo	25 March 2009
43	Finland	5 May 2009
44	Morocco	8 May 2009
45	Solomon Islands	25 September 2009
46	Malaysia	5 October 2009
47	United Arab Emirates	16 October 2009
48	Cambodia	26 October 2009
49	Belgium	18 May 2010
50	Egypt	25 September 2010
51	Slovenia	18 February 2011
52	Georgia	17 October 2011
53	Monaco	26 October 2011
54	Brunei	16 December 2011
55	Poland	27 January 2012
56	Luxembourg	16 February 2012
57	Panama	18 April 2012
58	Kazakhstan	19 November 2012
59	Jordan	10 March 2013
—	Cook Islands	3 September 2013
60	Lithuania	25 September 2013
61	Mongolia	25 September 2013
62	Montenegro	25 September 2013
63	Estonia	8 November 2013
64	Maldives	17 October 2014
65	Latvia	20 March 2015
66	Seychelles	30 March 2015
67	Fiji	2 April 2015
68	Kuwait	26 May 2015
69	Cyprus	10 August 2015
70	Cuba	26 September 2015
71	Croatia	26 September 2015
72	Norway	31 May 2017
73	Hungary	18 September 2017
74	Armenia	21 September 2017
75	Tajikistan	30 January 2018
76	Azerbaijan	1 February 2018
77	Romania	16 February 2018
78	Mauritius	15 March 2018
79	Malta	17 July 2018
80	Andorra	25 September 2018
81	San Marino	26 September 2018
82	Bahrain	28 September 2018
83	Denmark	30 November 2018
84	Serbia	7 December 2018
85	Dominica	2018
86	Peru	14 February 2019
87	Nicaragua	17 June 2019
88	Bangladesh	16 July 2019
89	Kyrgyzstan	7 October 2021
90	Pakistan	22 November 2021
91	Moldova	6 December 2021
92	Nepal	21 March 2022
93	Paraguay	1 April 2022
94	Jamaica	28 April 2022
95	Bulgaria	7 July 2022
96	Tuvalu	15 July 2022
97	Cape Verde	22 September 2022
98	Ecuador	24 October 2022
99	Saudi Arabia	23 November 2022
100	Guatemala	19 January 2023
101	Dominican Republic	15 February 2023
102	Saint Kitts and Nevis	21 May 2024
103	Saint Vincent and the Grenadines	21 May 2024
104	Ukraine	16 June 2024
105	Belize	25 September 2024
106	Bahamas	23 September 2025
107	Benin	24 September 2025
108	Uzbekistan	26 September 2025
109	Antigua and Barbuda	September 2025
110	Trinidad and Tobago	25 March 2026

== Bilateral relations ==
=== Americas ===
Country	Notes
Mexico	Mexico is accredited to Palau from its embassy in Manila, Philippines.
United States	See Palau–United States relations Both countries are members of the Compact of Free Association.: Palau has an embassy in Washington, D.C.; United States has an embassy in Airai.

=== Asia ===
Country	Notes
India	See India–Palau relations As per the Ministry of External Affairs of India, India established diplomatic relations with Palau in April 1995. Development assistance from India has included a grant of US$149,841 for purchase of kitchen equipment for Palau National Hospital, US $ in 2008 for purchase of a boat and two pick-up trucks, US$100,000 in June 2010 for purchase of computers and grant of 2 ITEC scholarships in 2010–11. Palau has been supportive of issues of importance to India, particularly Indian candidature to international organizations. It supported India's candidature for the non-permanent membership of the UN Security Council for the 2011–12 term. Presently, there are about 15 Indian nationals in Palau.
Israel	See Israel–Palau relations
Japan	See Japan–Palau relations Diplomatic relations between Japan and Palau were established in December 1994. Japan maintains an embassy at Ngerekebesang in Koror. Japan is currently the second largest donor to Palau after the United States. Ministerial level visits are frequent between the two countries, and Palau is a popular tourist destination for Japanese travellers. Emperor Akihito and Empress Michiko made a state visit to Palau in April 2015.
Philippines	See Palau–Philippines relations Both countries were incorporated by Spain in the Spanish East Indies, where the capital was Manila, during the 16th century and was formalized in Palau in the 17th century. Palau was a part, and was represented, in the congress of the First Philippine Republic., but due to the German-Spanish Treaty was eventually handed over to Germany, ending Philippine-Palau relations during that period. Formal diplomatic relations were again made on July 15, 1997, after Palau became independent from the United States. Palau's 2025 census recorded 2,823 residents with Philippine citizenship, 17.1% of valid responses. Few of Palau's students are educated in the Philippines, notably in Mindanao's top universities. The Philippine embassy in Koror closed on July 31, 2012. Palau and the Philippines are currently discussing the bordering of their maritime borders to negate any future clashes on the matter.
Taiwan	See Palau–Taiwan relations Palau has been strengthening relations with the Republic of China in economic and political relations since 1994.

=== Europe ===
Country	Notes
Germany	Germany is represented in Palau through its embassy in the Philippines.
Serbia	Palau–Serbia relations Both nations are members of the United Nations where they cooperate on issues of climate change. Two countries collaborate through their non-resident embassies in Tokyo.
Spain	See Palau–Spain relations
United Kingdom	See Palau–United Kingdom relations Palau established diplomatic relations with the United Kingdom on 16 August 1996.: Palau does not maintain an embassy in the United Kingdom.; The United Kingdom is not accredited to Palau through an embassy; the UK develops relations through its embassy in Manila, Philippines.; Both countries share common membership of the United Nations, and the World Health Organization.

=== Oceania ===
Country	Notes
Australia	See Australia–Palau relations
Marshall Islands	See Marshall Islands-Palau relations
Micronesia	See Federated States of Micronesia–Palau relations

== Military relations ==
The Palau government has agreed to host a large United States Air Force high-frequency radar station in Palau, a Tactical Multi-Mission Over the Horizon Radar (TACMOR) system costing well over $100 million, which is expected to be operational in 2026.

Palau has participated in various U.S. military exercises over the years, including Exercise Valiant Shield. The first-launch in Palau of a Patriot surface-to-air missile by the U.S. took place in 2022 Valiant Shield, which also had the experimental deployment of A-10 Warthogs at Roman Tmetuchl International Airport.

== See also ==
- Compact of Free Association
- List of diplomatic missions in Palau
- List of diplomatic missions of Palau
- Trust Territory of the Pacific Islands
