= Kosovo–Palau relations =

- Kosovo: Palau

Kosovo–Palau relations are foreign relations between Kosovo and Palau.

== History ==
Kosovo declared its independence from Serbia on 17 February 2008. On 6 March 2009, Palau officially recognized Kosovo as an independent and sovereign state.

On 21 January 2019, the Ministry of Foreign Affairs of Serbia claimed that Palau had withdrawn its recognition of Kosovo. The Ministry of Foreign Affairs of Kosovo denied the Palauan decision to media while Serbian side refused to comment ahead of the official bilateral meeting.

On 23 September 2022, the President of Kosovo, Vjosa Osmani, met with Palau's Foreign Minister Gustav Aitaro and both sides reconfirmed their bilateral relations and multilateral cooperation. In October 2022, Palau's Vice-President Uduch Sengebau Senior made an official visit to Kosovo, where she met with President Osmani, and the sides confirmed their willingness to further deepen their bilateral relations. Kosovo's ambassador in Tokyo, Sabri Kiçmari, presented credentials to the president of Palau, Surangel Whipps Jr., in October 2023, confirming formal diplomatic relations between the two countries.

== See also ==
- Foreign relations of Kosovo
- Foreign relations of Palau
