= List of diplomatic missions of Palau =

This is a list of diplomatic missions of Palau, and it also includes a list of the Palauan Consulates.

The Republic of Palau, a small Pacific island state in a Compact of Free Association with the United States, only has a small number of diplomatic missions and consulates.

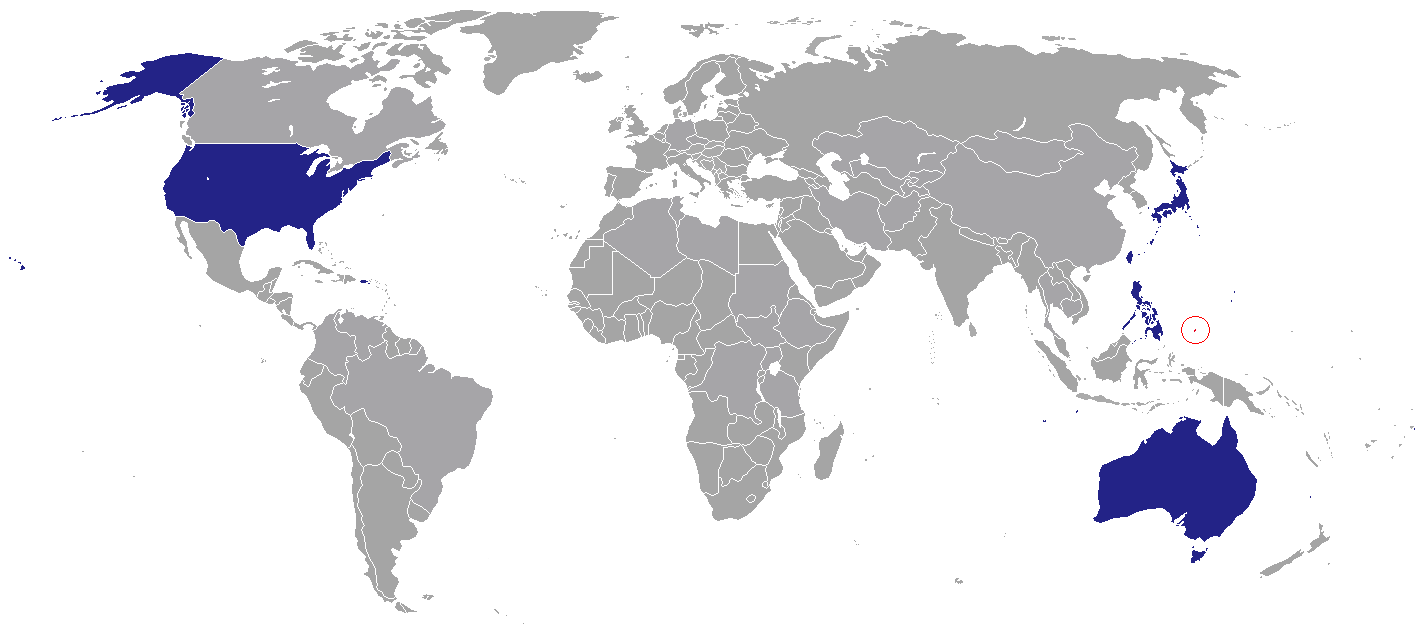
Diplomatic missions of Palau

== Diplomatic missions ==
This is a list of Palauan embassies and consulates:

Host country	Host city	Mission	Year opened	Continent	Concurrent accreditation	Ref.
Australia	Canberra	Embassy	2026	Oceania		
Japan	Tokyo	Embassy	1999	Asia	Countries: Belgium; China; Denmark; Finland; France; Germany; Iceland; Ireland; Netherlands; North Korea; Norway; Russia; South Korea; Sweden; United Kingdom	
Philippines	Manila	Embassy	2012	Asia	Countries: Afghanistan; Bahrain; Bangladesh; Brunei; Cambodia; India; Indonesia; Iran; Iraq; Laos; Malaysia; Maldives; Myanmar; Nepal; Oman; Pakistan; Qatar; Saudi Arabia; Singapore; Sri Lanka; Thailand; United Arab Emirates; Vietnam; Yemen	
Republic of China (Taiwan)	Taipei	Embassy	2013	Asia	Countries: Kazakhstan; Kyrgyzstan; Mongolia; Tajikistan; Turkmenistan; Uzbekistan	
United States	Washington, D.C.	Embassy	1994	North America	Countries: Belize; Canada; Chile; Colombia; Costa Rica; Ecuador; El Salvador; Guatemala; Honduras; Mexico; Nicaragua; Panama; Peru	
United States	Hagåtña (Guam)	Consulate-General	1994	Oceania	Countries: Belize; Canada; Chile; Colombia; Costa Rica; Ecuador; El Salvador; Guatemala; Honduras; Mexico; Nicaragua; Panama; Peru	
United States	Saipan (Northern Mariana Islands)	Consulate-General	1999	Oceania	Countries: Belize; Canada; Chile; Colombia; Costa Rica; Ecuador; El Salvador; Guatemala; Honduras; Mexico; Nicaragua; Panama; Peru	

== International organizations ==
This is a list of Palauan missions to international organizations:

Host country	Host city	Mission	Year opened	Continent	Concurrent accreditation	Ref.
United Nations	New York	Permanent Mission	1994	North America	Countries: Antigua and Barbuda; Bahamas; Barbados; Brazil; Cuba; Dominica; Dominican Republic; Grenada; Haiti; Jamaica; Saint Kitts and Nevis; Saint Lucia; Saint Vincent and the Grenadines; Trinidad and Tobago; Venezuela	

== Gallery ==
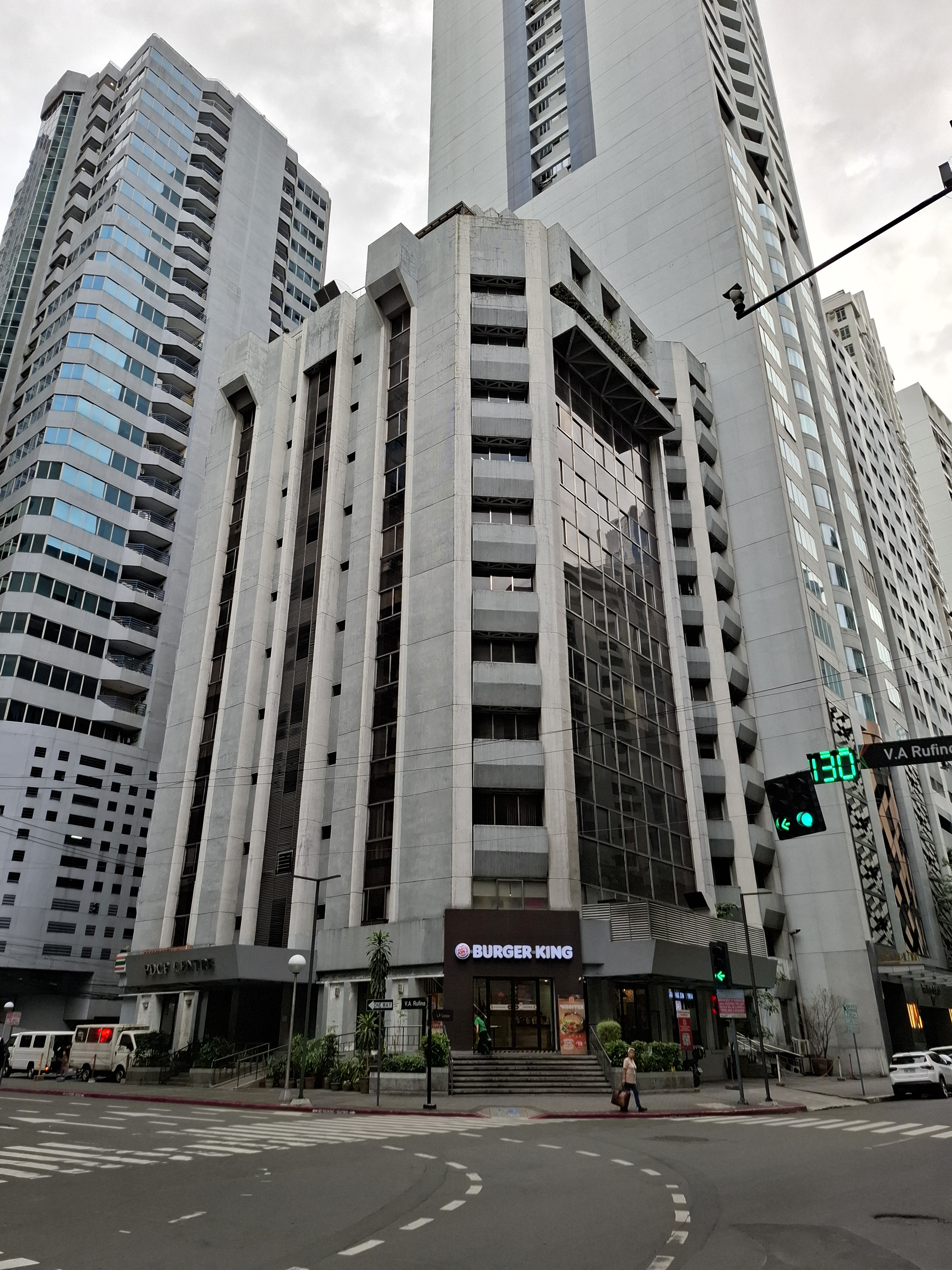
Building hosting the Embassy in Manila

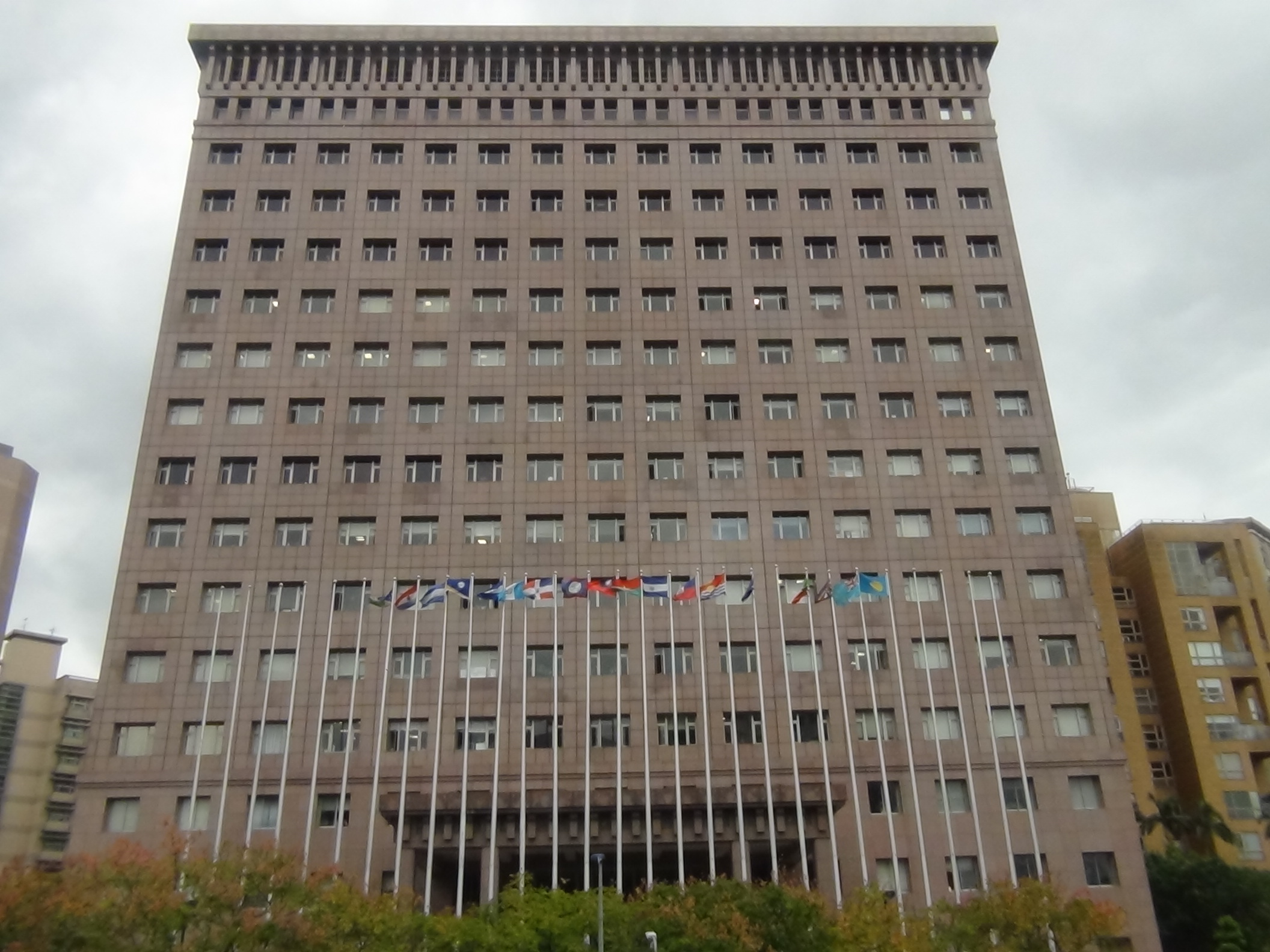
Embassy in Taipei

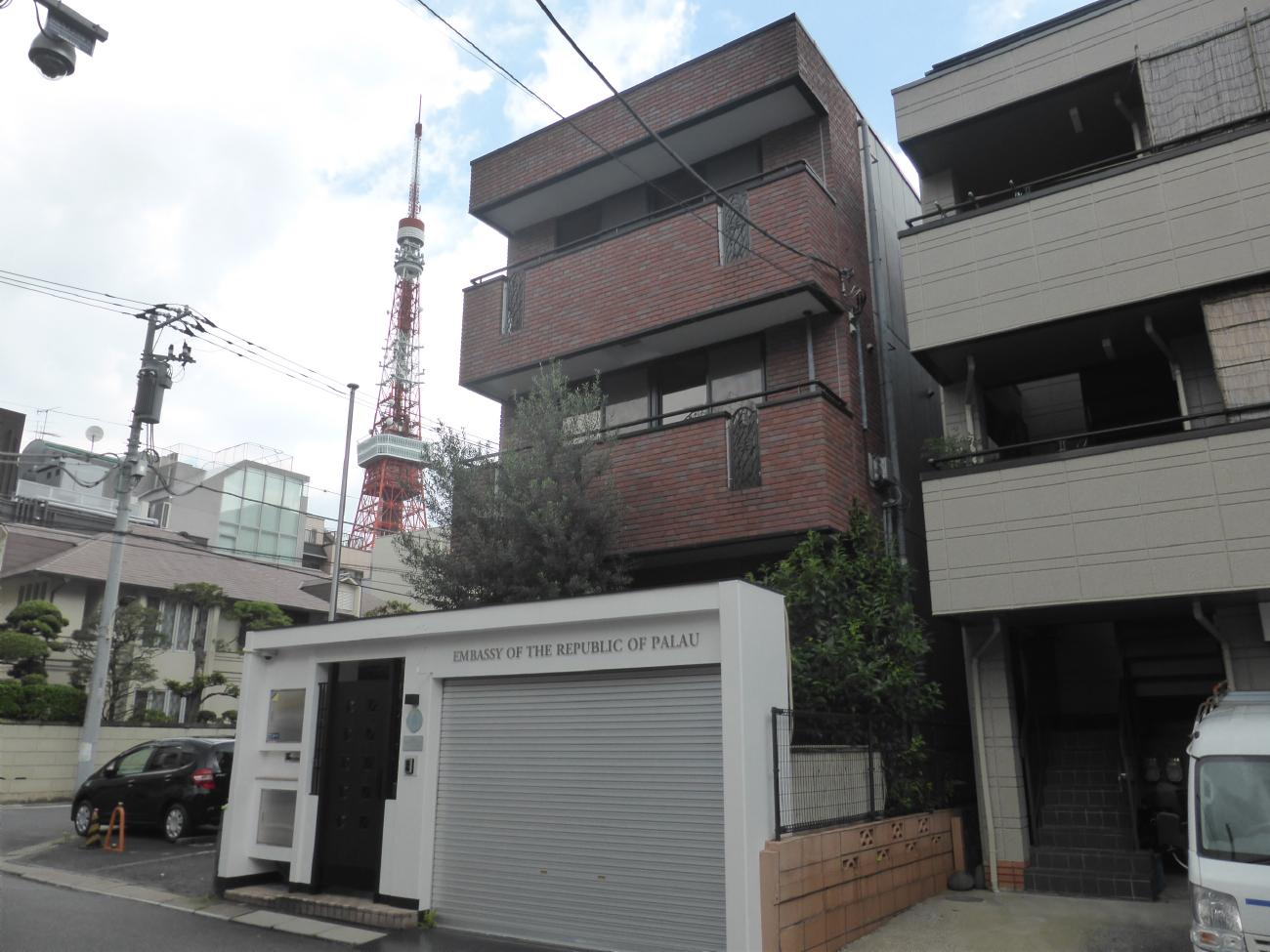
Embassy in Tokyo

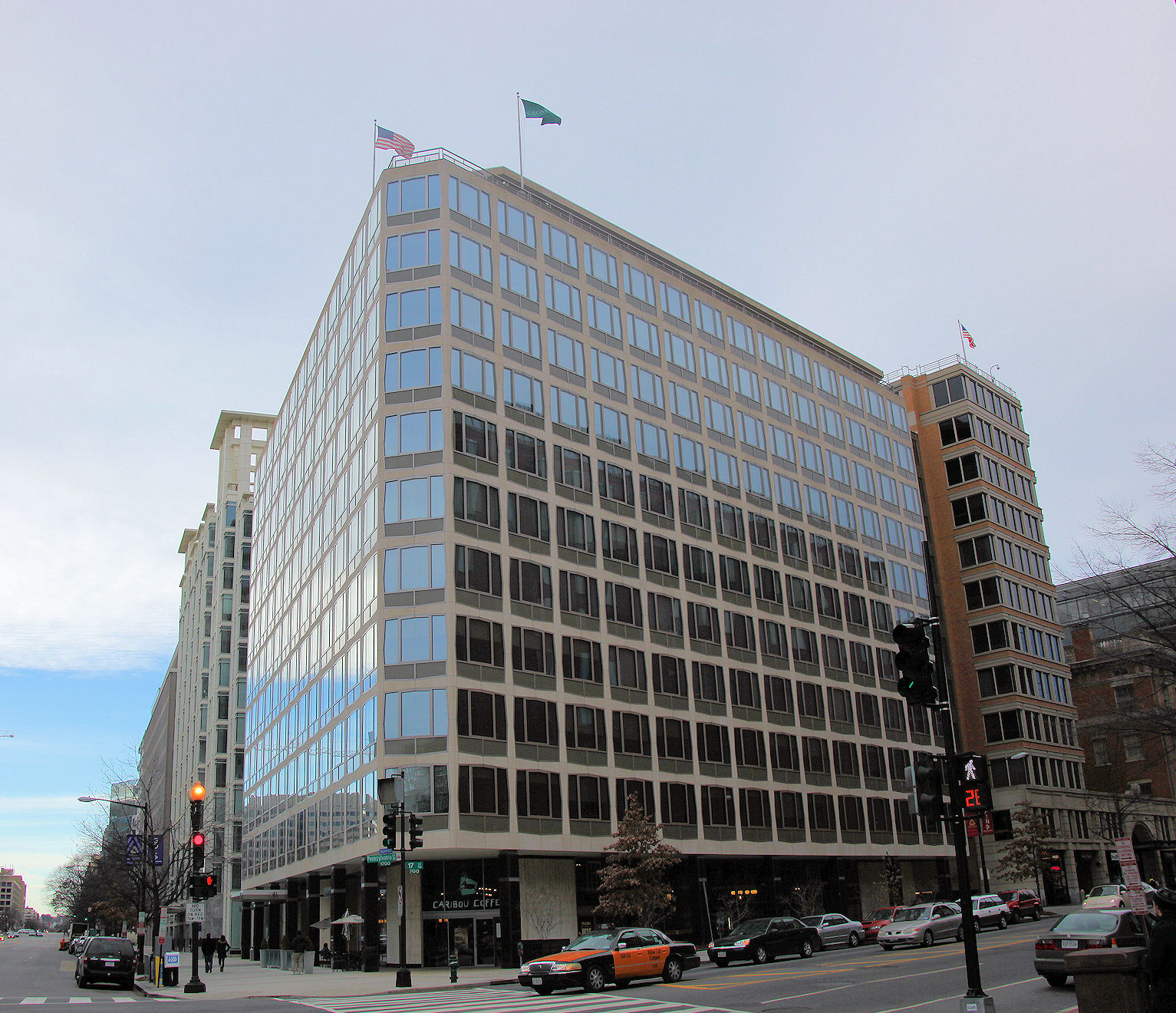
Building hosting the Embassy in Washington, D.C.

== See also ==
- Foreign relations of Palau
- List of diplomatic missions in Palau
