= Australia–Palau relations =

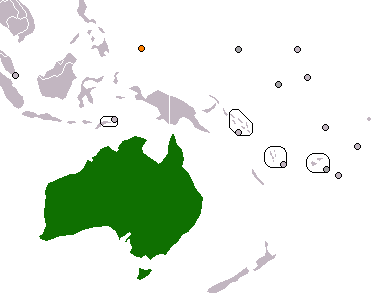

- Australia: Palau

Bilateral relations exist between Australia and Palau. Both countries are members of the Pacific Islands Forum (PIF), the Pacific Regional Environment Programme and The Pacific Community.

== High level visits ==
In 2014, Australian deputy Prime Minister Warren Truss paid an official visit to Palau.

== Military relations ==
Australia and Palau have extensive military relations primarily in maritime security. Australia has provided a Pacific class patrol vessel to Palau to ensure maritime security and fight against illegal fishing. Lieutenant Commander Alan Willmore from the Royal Australian Navy is the Maritime Surveillance Advisor of Palau.

== Development assistance ==
Australia has been assisting Palau in the clearance of unexploded ordnance (UXO) from World War II and is the largest donor to Palau in this issue. Australia has also been helping Palau in the education and health sectors. Between 2024-25 and 2026-27, Australia provided Palau with roughly $16 million in aid, as part of its broader aid program for the Micronesia region.

In the late 1990s and early 2000s, Australia had a roughly $1 million development program named "Plant Protection in Micronesia". The project supported the Federated States of Micronesia, the Marshall Islands and Palau to strengthen plant protection and quarantine systems and prevent the introduction of pests. Australia's funding supported staffing, training, equipment, travel and operational costs. The project helped protect agricultural and forestry resources and supported local and regional food production.

== Trade ==
As of 2013, Australian exports to Palau valued at $800,000 mainly consisting food products.

== Resident diplomatic missions ==
- Australia has an embassy in Koror.
- Palau has an embassy in Canberra.

== See also ==
- Foreign relations of Australia
- Foreign relations of Palau
