= Palau–Serbia relations =

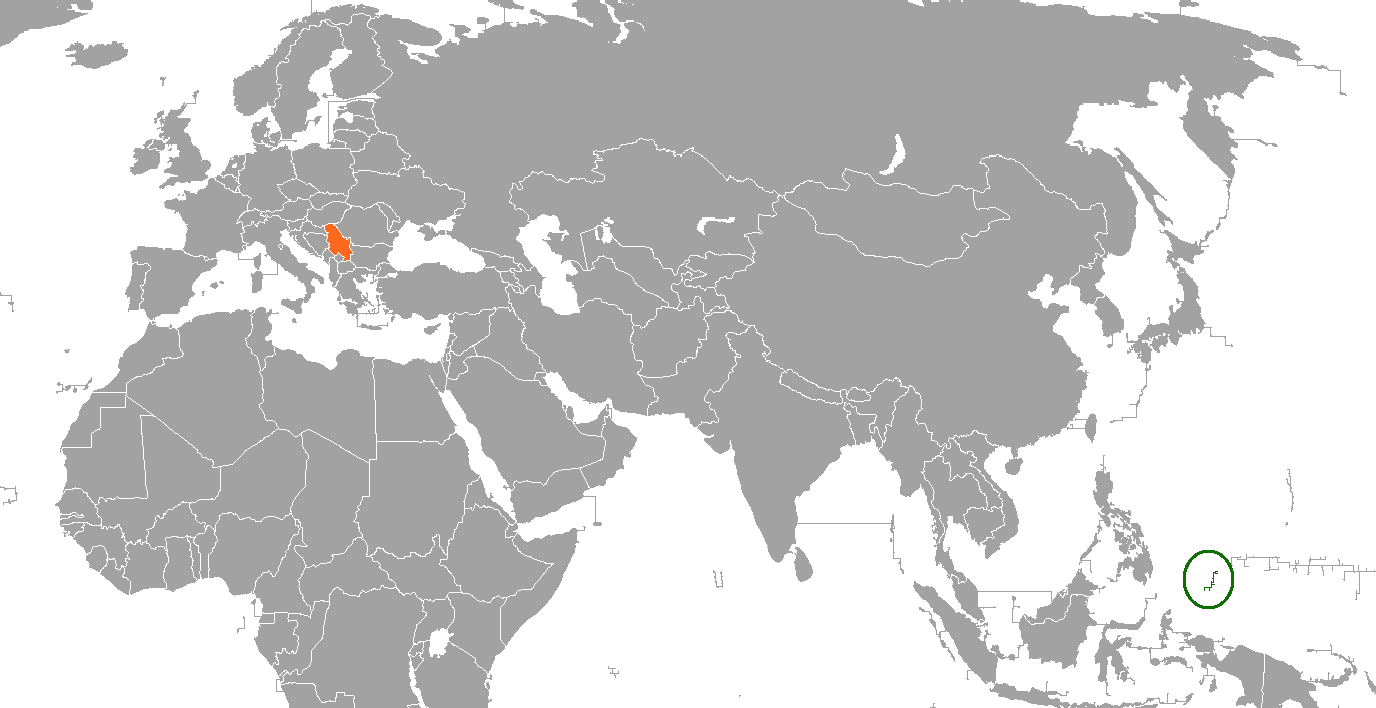
- Palau: Serbia

Palau and Serbia maintain diplomatic relations established in 2018.

== History ==
During the Cold War period SFR Yugoslavia (of which Serbia was constituent part) was one of the initial member states of the Special Committee on Decolonization where together with India the country criticized the refusal of the administering powers of the United Nations trust territories (including in the case of Trust Territory of the Pacific Islands) to cooperate with the body.

Initial push for the improvement of bilateral relations between the two countries came from the meeting between Minister of Foreign Affairs of Serbia Ivica Dačić and President of Palau Thomas Remengesau Jr. at the Seventy-third session of the United Nations General Assembly at which they agreed initial bilateral meetings.

Formal bilateral relations between the two states were established in 2019 during the first visit of President of Palau Thomas Remengesau Jr. to Belgrade. Among other officials, president of Palau met President of Serbia Aleksandar Vučić, Prime Minister of Serbia Ana Brnabić, President of the National Assembly of Serbia Maja Gojković and the Minister of Foreign Affairs Ivica Dačić. Serbian authorities decided to abolish visa requirements for the citizens of Palau ahead of the visit.

The relations were established in the context of the decision of Palau to withdraw its recognition of Kosovo which followed the same decision by Papua New Guinea, Solomon Islands and some other countries. Palau initially recognized Kosovo in 2009 as the 56th state to do so. Palau recognized Kosovo during President's Johnson Toribiong visit to the United States, the country with which Palau signed the Compact of Free Association after Trust Territory of the Pacific Islands gained independence in 1994. Radio Free Europe/Radio Liberty questioned the role of Russia in Palau's 2019 decision with Serbian minister Dačić denying their direct role. President of Palau stated that his country has decided to reconsider the earlier position to recognize Kosovo and called for resumption of a comprehensive dialogue. The Ministry of Foreign Affairs of Kosovo initially denied Palauan decision to media while Serbian side refused to comment ahead of the official bilateral meeting.

Serbian Minister of Foreign Affairs Ivica Dačić expressed self-criticism and regret that after the death of Josip Broz Tito and breakup of Yugoslavia his country failed to maintain its friendly relations with Pacific nations. Dr Nina Marković, a sessional lecturer at Macquarie University expressed her belief that the formal relations will bring Serbian support for Pacific nations within the United Nations forums on issues related to effects of climate change on island nations. In their bilateral meeting two countries underlined the importance of their shared commitment to the protection of the environment. Since both countries ratified the 2015 Paris Agreement and participate in the work of the United Nations Environment Programme President of Palau expressed his belief that Serbia can provide significant support to his country both at multilateral level and via direct engagements. He also recognized Serbian results in solid waste management, an issue representing a serious problem in his country.

Two presidents met again in New York in 2019 where they underlined the need for further cooperation in multilateral organizations. Serbian Minister of Youth and Sports Vanja Udovičić participated in the ceremonies marking the 25th anniversary of the independence in 2019. Serbian minister, himself a former waterpolo player, visited Palau’s waterpolo team where he played a game with the local team. During the visit Serbia pledged $600,000 to help Palau cover hosting of the Our Ocean Conference.

Together with eight other countries, Serbia and Palau proposed UNESCO and the Ocean for the agenda of the 214th session of the Executive Board of that body. That same year Serbian non-resident ambassador to Palau Aleksandra Kovač attended the Our Ocean Conference which Palau co-organized with the United States after the event was initially postponed due to COVID pandemic. During the conference ambassador Kovač met with President Surangel Whipps Jr. and Tommy Remengesau, Speaker of the House Sabino Anastacio, ministers Gustav Aitaro and Jafar Uherbelau, Senate's foreign affairs committee chairman Mason Whipps, and the President and Secretary of the National Olympic Committee Frank Kyota and Baklai Temengil.

== Resident diplomatic missions ==
- Palau is accredited to Serbia through its embassy in Tokyo, Japan.
- Serbia is accredited to Palau through its embassy in Tokyo, Japan.

== See also ==
- Foreign relations of Palau
- Foreign relations of Serbia
- Politics of global warming
- Climate Vulnerable Forum
