= Palau–Spain relations =

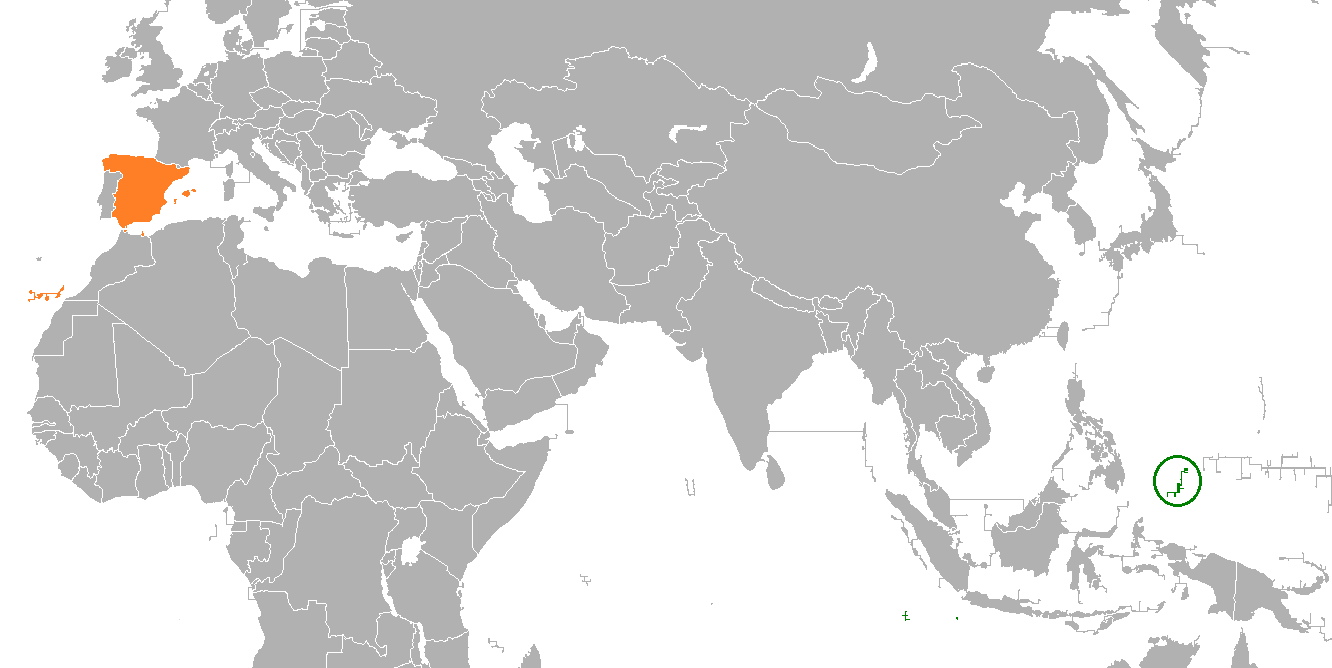
- Palau: Spain

Palau–Spain relations are the bilateral and diplomatic relations between these two countries. Palau currently has no diplomatic or consular representation in Spain. However, Spain has a consulate in Koror, while the embassy representing Spain for Palau is in Manila, Philippines.

== Historical relations ==
It is believed that the first European explorer to see the islands was the Spanish Gonzalo Gómez de Espinosa in 1522, aboard the ship Trinidad , during the Magellan-Elcano expedition. Later, it would be visited by Ruy López de Villalobos in 1543.

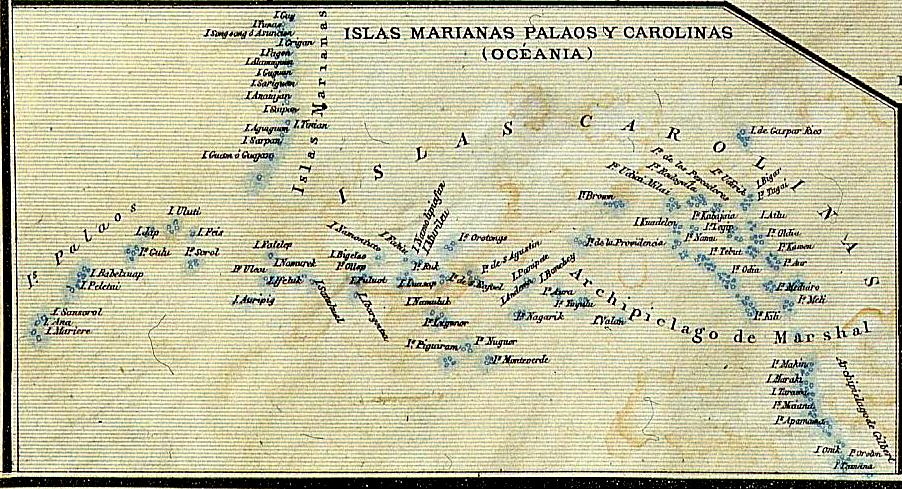
Islands Marianas, Palau and Carolinas of Captaincy General of the Philippines in 1888.

After the conquest of the Philippines in 1565 by the Spanish Empire, the Palau archipelago belonged to the Captaincy General of the Philippines, created in 1574, as part of the Spanish East Indies.

However, the Spanish presence only began to express itself with evangelization, initiated at the end of the 17th century, and its dominance began to be delineated in the 18th century.

The first encounters were with whalers and merchants, who used the islands as stopovers in their travels. From those first contacts, but especially in the 19th century, diseases brought on ships from Europe decimated the population of the island, in particular smallpox, flu and leprosy, the same as the use of firearms to resolve tribal differences. It is estimated that the indigenous population went from 50,000 inhabitants before coming into contact with Europeans, to a total not exceeding 3,700 at the beginning of 20th century.

== Diplomatic relations ==
Palau established diplomatic relations with Spain on 3 August 1995. In December 2012, the President of the Government sent a letter of condolences to President Remengesau Jr for the victims and the disastrous effects of Typhoon Bopha. In November 2013, the King of Spain sent a letter of condolences to President Remengesau for the substantial material damage suffered by Typhoon Haiyan.

At the end of 2014, Palau decriminalized homosexual relations after the mediation of Spain and other countries.

== Cooperation ==
In the year 2013 they have been granted within the framework of the Program for Cultural Cooperation for the Philippines and the Pacific (SPCC), an aid worth 100,000.00 Philippine pesos (€1,887.51) for the celebration of the "2nd Annual Conference Dilmlengui Women Group". In view of the 45th Summit of the Pacific Islands Forum, Spain has decided to support the organization with 20,000 euros, as it did in previous years at that summit.

== See also ==
- Foreign relations of Palau
- Foreign relations of Spain
