= List of diplomatic missions in Palau =

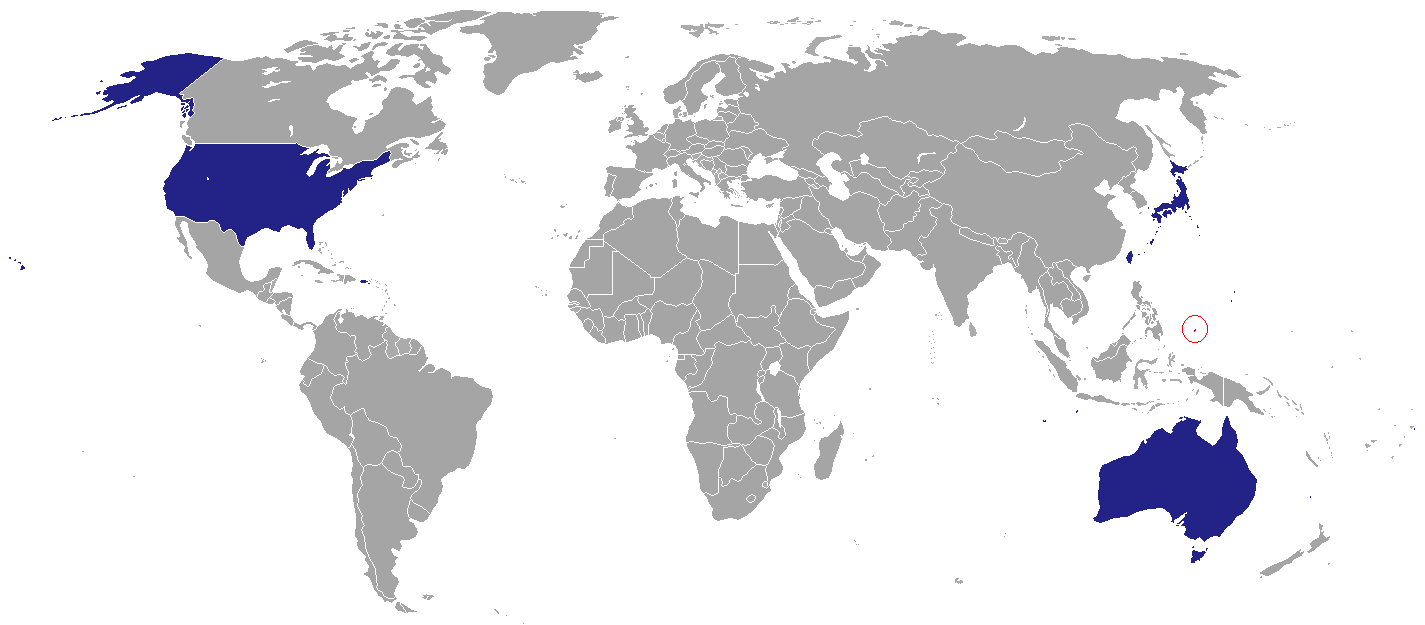
Diplomatic missions in Palau

This is a list of diplomatic missions in Palau. The former capital, Koror, hosts three embassies whilst Airai hosts only one embassy. The capital, Ngerulmud, hosts no embassies.

== Embassies ==
=== Koror ===
- Australia
- Republic of China (Taiwan)
- Japan

=== Airai ===
- United States

== Non-Resident Embassies ==
Resident in Manila, Philippines:

- Austria
- Bangladesh
- Belgium
- Brazil
- Canada
- Chile
- Czechia
- Colombia
- Denmark
- France
- Germany
- Greece
- Hungary
- Indonesia
- Ireland
- Israel
- Italy
- Laos
- Libya
- Malaysia
- Mexico
- Norway
- Pakistan
- Poland
- Qatar
- Romania
- Russia
- Saudi Arabia
- South Korea
- South Africa
- Spain
- Switzerland
- Thailand
- United Arab Emirates
- United Kingdom
- Vietnam

Resident in Tokyo, Japan:

- Afghanistan
- Algeria
- Costa Rica
- Finland
- Guatemala
- Honduras
- Kenya
- Lithuania
- Maldives
- Namibia
- Nicaragua
- Peru
- Paraguay
- Panama
- Philippines
- Serbia
- Slovakia
- Sweden
- Togo
- Turkmenistan
- Turkey
- Tunisia
- Tajikistan
- Uganda
- Ukraine
- Yemen
- Zambia
- Zimbabwe

Resident elsewhere:

- China (Palikir)
- Cuba (Suva)
- Holy See (Wellington)
- New Zealand (Honolulu)
- Portugal (Canberra)
- Seychelles (New York City)
- Sierra Leone (Seoul)
- Tonga (Canberra)

== Former Embassies ==
- Philippines (closed in 2012) (Note: Resident in Tokyo, Japan)

== See also ==
- Foreign relations of Palau
- List of diplomatic missions of Palau
