= Palau–Philippines relations =

- Palau: Philippines

Palau–Philippines relations refers to the bilateral relations between Palau and the Philippines, who share the same Austronesia culture languages. The Philippines and Palau have shared centuries of history under the same Spanish colony, and after Philippine independence, Palaos (Palau) sent a delegation to the Malolos Congress.

== History ==
Both countries were colonies of the Spanish Empire and governed as the Spanish East Indies. Palau was part of the Spanish Empire from 1574 to 1899. When the Philippine Republic's legislature, the Malolos Congress was convened, a delegation to Palaos was present. The term Palaos that was used by the Malolos Congress referred to the entire Nuevas Filipinas (New Philippines), now known as the Mariana Islands, Marshall Islands, and the Caroline Islands, where the main center at the time was in Palau, hence why the entire area was also called Palaos. A stable independent Philippine state failed to realize because of a United States invasion, and Palau was sold by Spain to the German Empire along with the Caroline Islands. The Japanese Empire annexed Palau in World War I from Germany administering it until World War II when the United States captured the islands. Palau was then incorporated into the United Nations-backed Trust Territory of the Pacific Islands in 1947.

In 1979, four constituents of the Trust Territory decided to form the Federated States of Micronesia and Palau opted to become its own independent state. The Philippines, along with Japan, and Republic of China (Taiwan) were the strong supporters of Palau independence.

In the recent era, formal diplomatic relations between Palau and the Philippines were established on July 15, 1997. The formalization of ties were done in Manila and was overseen by Philippine Foreign Secretary Domingo Siazon and Palau Minister of State Andres Uherbelau.

== Diplomatic missions ==
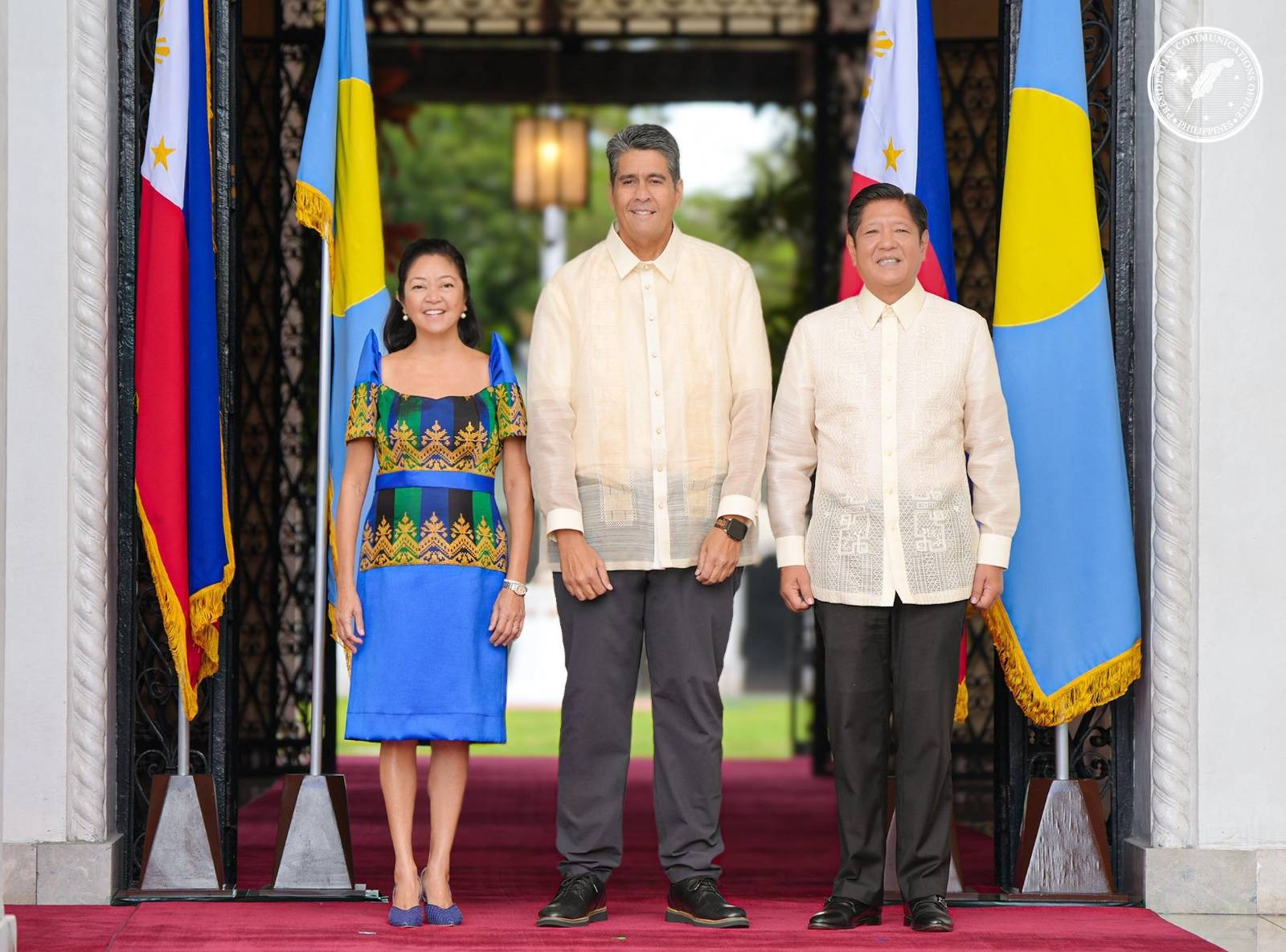
Palau President Surangel Whipps Jr. (center) with Philippine President Bongbong Marcos (right) and First Lady Liza Araneta Marcos (left) at Malacañang Palace, Manila, on February 24, 2025.

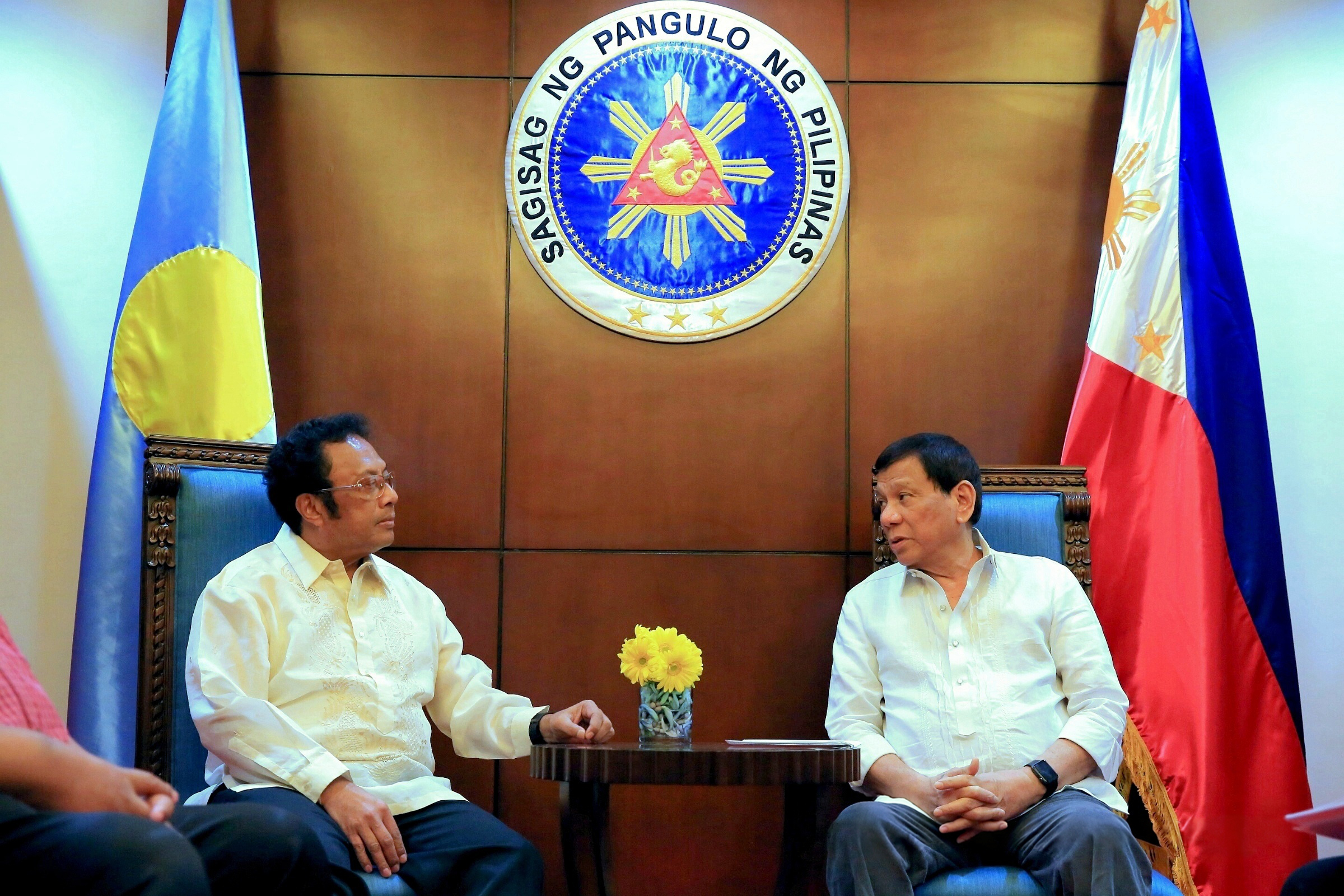
Palau President Thomas Remengesau Jr. meets with Philippine President Rodrigo Duterte in Davao City on February 15, 2018.

Palau currently has an embassy in Manila as of 2012 while the Philippines previously had an embassy in Koror which opened in 1998. The closure of the embassy in Palau along with 9 other diplomatic missions of the Philippines by the end of July 2012 was announced on January 25, 2012. Budgetary constraints was the cited reason.

Palau President Johnson Toribiong requested President Benigno Aquino III to reconsider the government's plan to close the embassy in Palau. According to Toribiong the embassy is essential in the delimitation talks on the two countries' maritime border and that the embassy serves about 5,000 Filipino workers, which compose of 60 percent of Palau's foreign work force and 20 percent of the country's total population. The closure of the Philippine embassy in Melekeok was expected to affect Filipinos in neighboring countries such as Micronesia and the Marshall Islands.

The Philippine embassy in Koror closed on July 31, 2012. Since then it has maintained relations with Palau along with Micronesia and the Marshall Islands through the DFA's Office of Asian and Pacific Affairs. Consular affairs fall under the auspices of the Philippine Consulate General in Hagåtña, Guam, and an honorary consulate in Koror.

== Cultural relations ==
There are 5,000 Filipino workers in Palau. 60 percent of all foreign workers from Palau came from the Philippines and they compose of 20 percent of Palau's total population. Palau's Medical Referral Program which was in force for almost 20 years, sends 100–150 patients annually to the Philippines for medical treatment. Many Palau citizens go to the Philippines to study in colleges and universities for higher education.

A pygmy population was reported in Palau but disappeared in about 1100 A.D.

== Disputes ==
=== Maritime borders ===
The exact boundaries of Palau and the Philippines is remained to be defined by delimitation talks. A final agreement has not been made regarding the issue. The two countries share a maritime border with Palau situated southeast of the Philippines. In September 2021, Philippine Foreign Secretary Teodoro Locsin Jr. met with Palau President Surangel Whipps Jr. with the former pledging to resolve the maritime dispute between two countries.

=== Filipinos fishing in Palau's EEZ ===
Filipinos fishing within Palau's Exclusive Economic Zone (EEZ) remains an irritant to the relations of both countries. Palau's waters, especially near its southern reefs is currently threatened by over-fishing from boats from China, Indonesia, the Philippines and other countries. Diplomatic relations between Palau and the Philippines reached its lowest point when Palau President Kuniwo Nakamura threatened to sever ties with the Philippines due to repeated violations of Palau's EEZ by Filipino fishing vessels in January 1999. However, in the recent years, Palau prefers to work on a fishing agreement with the Philippines rather than to file diplomatic protest against its neighbor. No fishing agreements have been established until now.

== See also ==
- Foreign relations of Palau
- Foreign relations of the Philippines
