= Palau–United States relations =

- Palau: United States

Palau–United States relations are bilateral relations between the sovereign nations of Palau and the United States.

== History ==
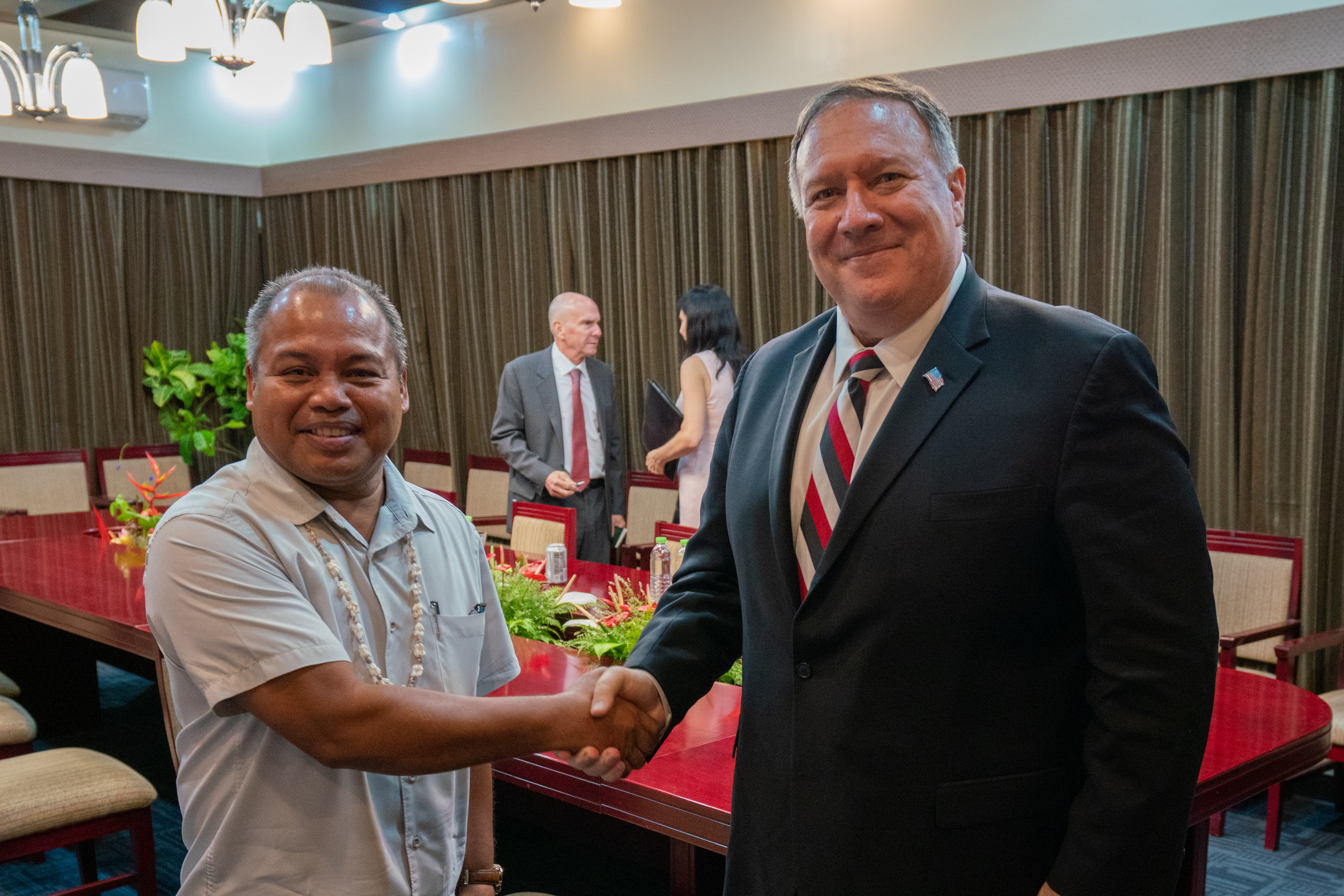
US Secretary of State Mike Pompeo and Palau Vice President Raynold Oilouch in 2019

Relations between Palau and the United States are strong, and the two nations cooperate on a number of issues. Palau is a sovereign state in free association with the United States. On October 1, 1994, after five decades of US administration, the country of Palau became the last component of the Trust Territory of the Pacific Islands to gain its independence. In 1978, Palau decided not to join the Federated States of Micronesia, due to culture and language differences, and instead sought independence. In 1986, a Compact of Free Association between Palau and the United States was approved, paving the way for Palau's independence. Finally ratified in 1993, the agreement came into force on October 1, 1994, the date of Palau's independence. Under the Compact, the US remains responsible for Palau's defense for 50 years, but only a small number of Navy Seabees are currently stationed in Palau.

In June 2009, Palauan President Johnson Toribiong accepted to "temporarily resettle" "up to seventeen" non-combatant Uyghur detainees from Guantanamo, at the United States' request.

In a 2009 interview with ABC Radio Australia, Palauan Minister of State Sandra Pierantozzi "admitted that [her] Government supports United States' embargo against Cuba to coax more aid from the United States". She told Radio Australia's James Oaten: "We have a very strong relationship with the United States and we don't want to jeopardise that relationship, because it would affect Palau's economic welfare."

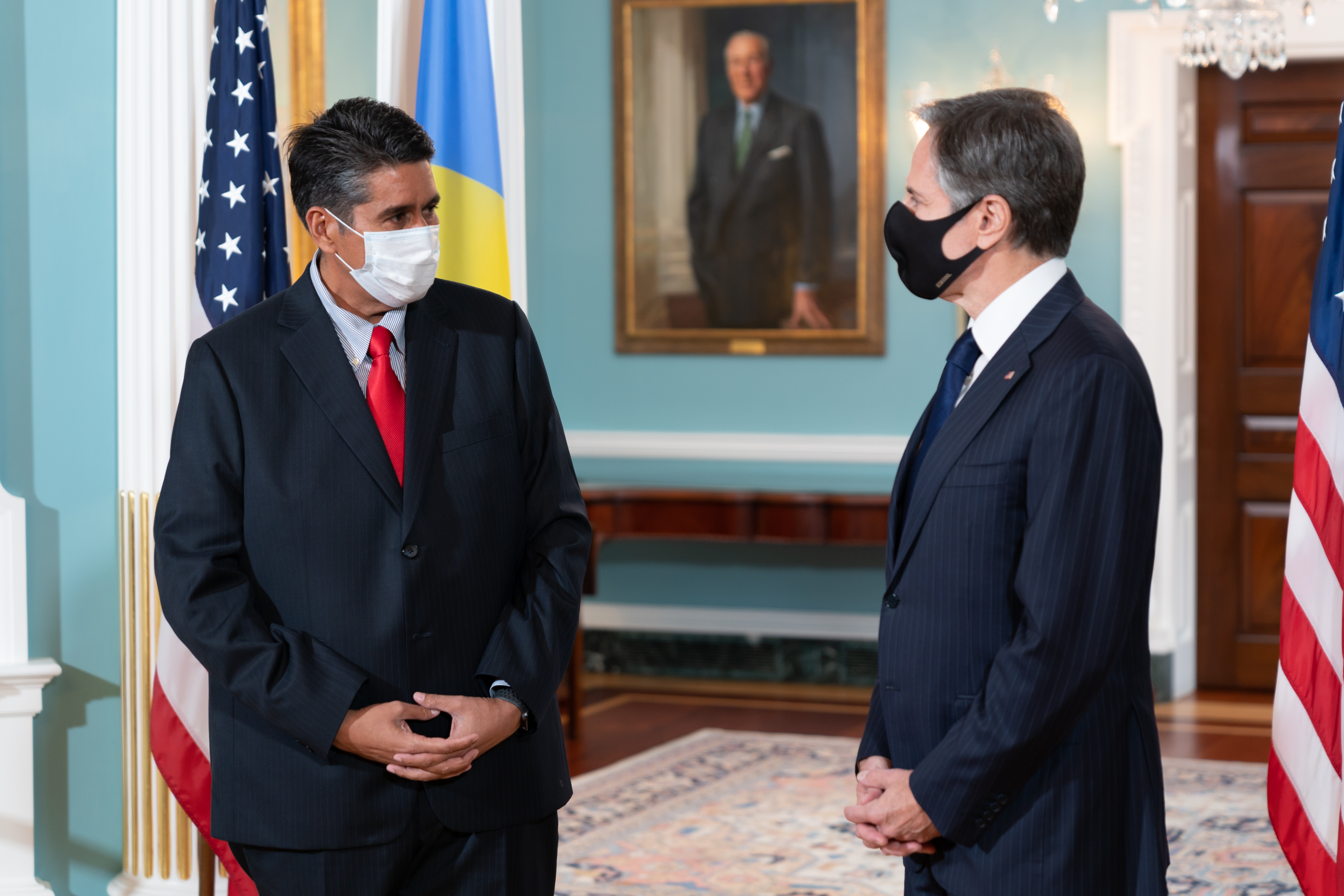
U.S. Secretary of State Antony Blinken meets with President of Palau Surangel Whipps Jr., at the Department of State in Washington, D.C., in August 2021.

In 2015, however, Palau voted to condemn the US embargo over Cuba. The motion at the United Nations was supported by 191 member states, with two votes against (the United States and Israel) and no country abstaining.

In September 2020, President Tommy Remengesau Jr. invited the United States, through US Defense Secretary Mark Esper, to build joint-use military facilities and use them. Remengesau also suggested a US Coast Guard presence in Palau to help patrol its vast marine reserve.

In July 2025, the United States asked Palau to host asylum seekers as part of the policy on immigration of President Trump. Both, the traditional chiefs of Palau and the Palau National Congress have issued a formal advice to president Surangel Whipps Jr. to reject said proposal.

== Resident diplomatic missions ==
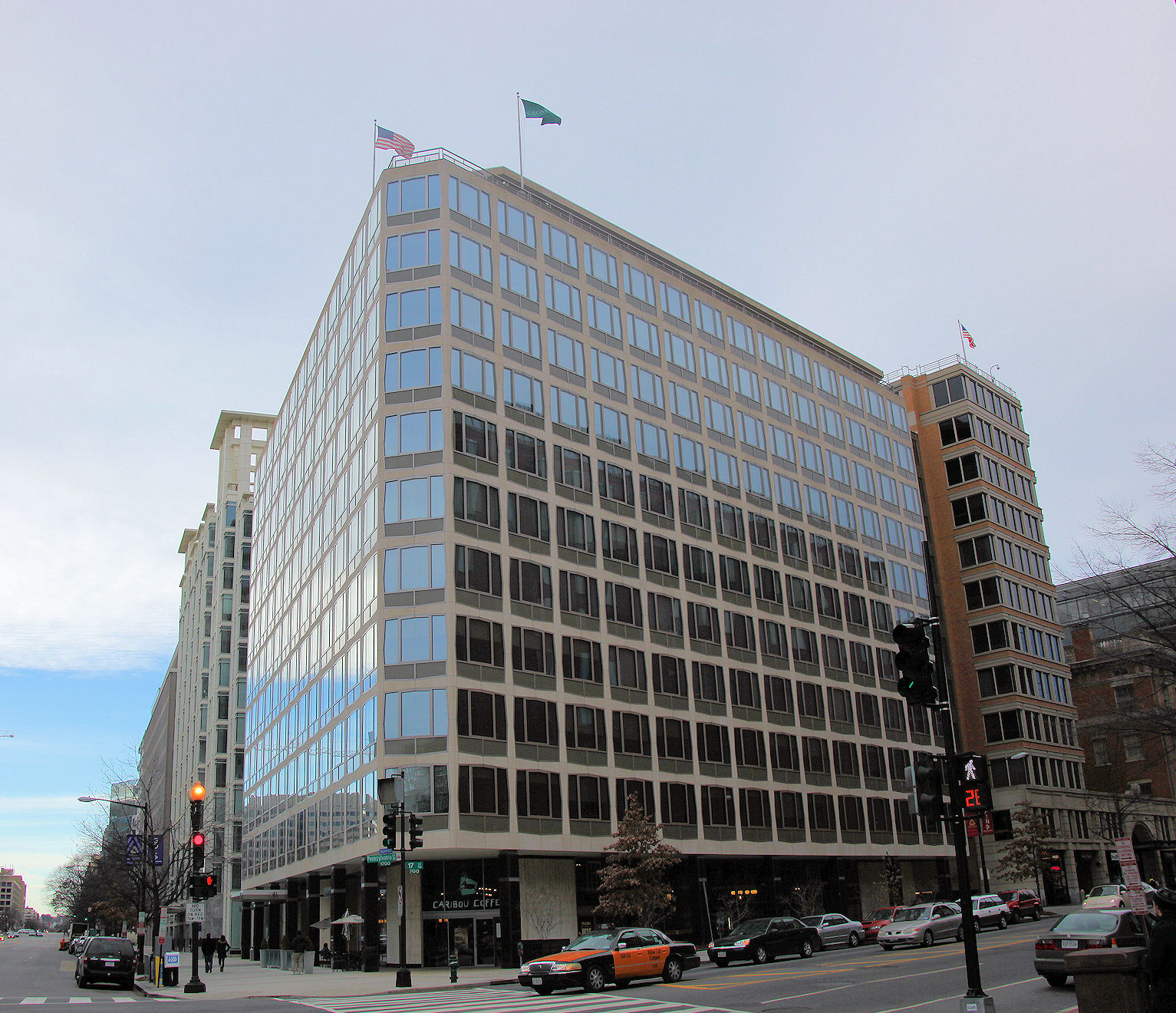
Building hosting the Embassy of Palau in Washington, D.C.

- Palau has an embassy in Washington, D.C. and has consulates-general in Hagåtña, Guam and in Saipan, Northern Mariana Islands.
- United States has an embassy in Airai.

== See also ==
- Foreign relations of Palau
