= India–Palau relations =

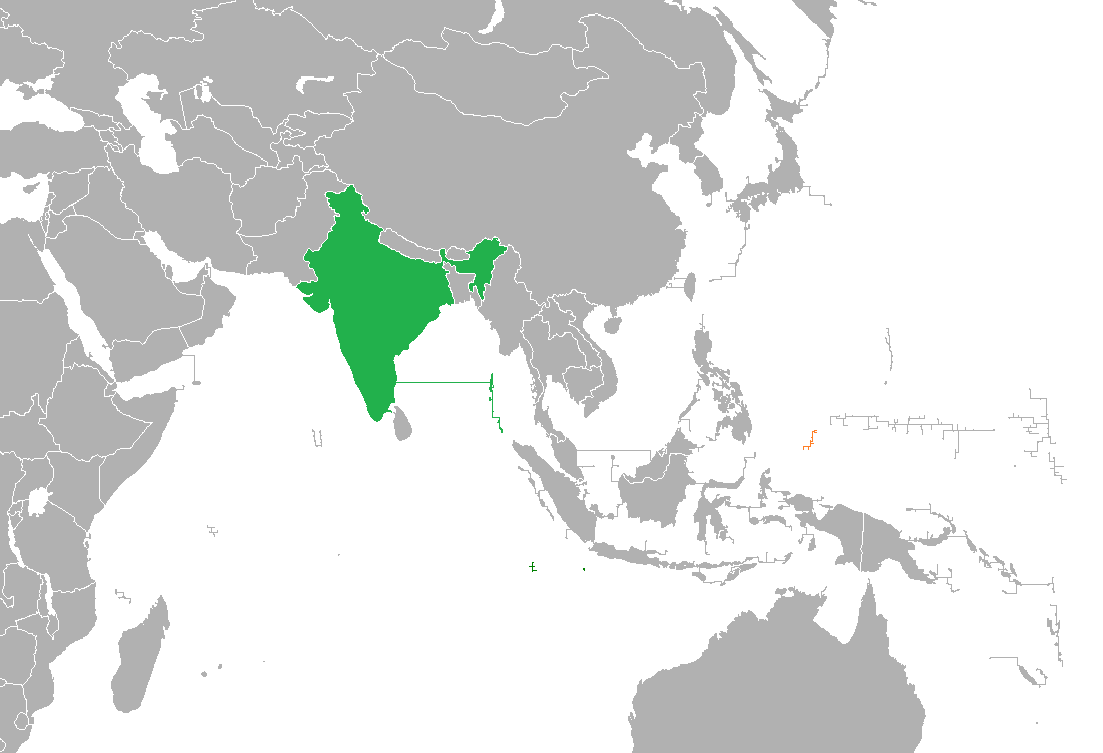
- India: Palau

Diplomatic relations between India and Palau were established in 1995. The Embassy of India in Manila, Philippines, is concurrently accredited to Palau.

== History ==
Since the establishment of diplomatic relations in April 1995, the two countries have conducted regular consultation and dialogue through the small island developing states (SIDS) forum of the United Nations, of which Palau is a member. The country is also a member of the Pacific Islands Forum, of which India is an official dialogue partner. Bilateral relations received a boost following the initiation of the Forum for India–Pacific Islands Cooperation by the Narendra Modi government in 2014. A Palauan delegation including Health Minister Gregorio Ngirmang and other senior officials attended the first India-Forum for Pacific Island Countries (FIPIC) Summit hosted in Suva, Fiji on 19 November 2014 by Prime Minister Modi.

Indian Ambassador to Palau (resident in Manila) Rajeet Mitter represented India at Palau's independence day celebrations in May 2009. Palau voted for India's candidature for a Non-Permanent Seat on the UN Security Council for the year 2011–12.

President Tommy Remengesau led a Palaun delegation to attend the 2nd Summit of Forum for India Pacific Islands Cooperation (FIPIC) held in Jaipur on 21 August 2015. Remengesau also held bilateral discussion with Prime Minister Modi on the sidelines of the summit. He sought an agreement on medical exchange with India, which would help the Palaun government reduce health care costs by sending patients to India for treatment instead of other countries.

Minister of State, Ministry of Science and Technology, & Ministry of Earth Sciences Y.S. Chowdary represented India at Remengesau's oath-taking ceremony to begin his fourth term as president on 19 January 2017. Following the ceremony, President Remengesau informed Chowdary that Palau would support India's candidature for a permanent seat in the UN Security Council.

== Trade ==
Bilateral trade between India and Palau is small due to Palau's small population and poor air connectivity with major transit points. Palau has direct air connectivity only with Manila and Guam. Bilateral trade between the two countries totaled US$170,000 in 2007-08 and rose to $800,000 in 2014–15. Trade rose significantly to $3.72 million in 2015–16, as result of exports of ships, boats and floating structures from Palau to India. India exported $200,000 worth of goods to Palau and imported $3.70 million in 2015–16. India imports from Palau rose from $100,000 the previous fiscal. The main commodity exported by India to Palau is pharmaceuticals. India's only imports from Palau were electrical machinery and equipment in 2014–15, and ships, boats and floating structures in 2015–16.

At the 2nd FIPIC Summit, Prime Minister Modi announced that a FIPIC Trade Office would be opened at the FICCI premises in New Delhi. The trade office, named the FIPIC Business Accelerator, was officially opened on 7 September 2015. The Confederation of Indian Industries (CII) has also established a dedicated department at its headquarters in New Delhi focusing on boosting trade with Pacific Island Countries.

=== Shipping ===
The Palau International Ship Registry (PISR) has offices in India, and many Palau-flagged vessels originate from India. On 28 February 2017, the Madras High Court ordered the arrest of Palau-flagged ship TB Parasea One. The ships's owner, Dubai-based Paradigm Seastar Ltd, had failed to pay ₹78 lakh (US$83,000) as dues for failing to complete a shipment on behalf of Mangalore-based Roy Lexim which had chartered the vessel to carry construction materials from Singapore to Male.

== Cultural relations ==
Palau issued a limited edition collectors' coin depicting the Hindu god Venkateswara on 16 April 2014, the day of Chaitra Purnima. This was the first coin featuring a Hindu deity to be issued by a country other than India. The silver coins are studded with six Swarovski crystals and a diamond. Palau issued 1,111 coins of 1 ounce and 511 coins of 3 ounces, with a face value of $5 and $20 respectively. Each coin was encased in specially designed boxes with LED lights inside and shaped like a small temple.

As of February 2016, around 20 Indian citizens reside in Palau. The Taj Palau is only Indian restaurant on the island.

== Foreign aid ==
India provided a grant of $150,000 to procure kitchen equipment for the Palau National Hospital and $100,000 to procure a boat and two pick-up trucks in 2008. Another $100,000 was provided in June 2010 for procurement of computers, and $100,000 in August 2011 for IT and computer up-gradation in Palauan Government offices and diplomatic missions. In June 2014, India provided a grant of $168,000 to assist Palau in hosting the 45th Pacific Islands Forum. India donated $50,000 towards disaster relief in the damage caused by Super-Typhoon Haiyan in March 2014.

India announced that it would provide a grant-in-aid of US$100,000 annually to each of the 14 Pacific Island countries, including Palau, at the Post Forum Dialogue partner meeting in 2006. The amount was increased to US$125,000 annually from 2009. At the first FIPIC Summit on 19 November 2014, Prime Minister Modi announced numerous steps that India would take to improve relations with Pacific Island countries, including Palau, such as easing visa policies, increase in grant-in-aid to Pacific Island Countries to $200,000 each annually, and several measures to boost bilateral trade and aid in the development of the Pacific Island countries.

India donated $10,000 to help fund a new office for the Palau Track and Field Association. The Association officially inaugurated the new office on 15 February 2017.

Citizens of Palau are eligible for scholarships under the Indian Technical and Economic Cooperation Programme. Palauan diplomats attended a special training course for diplomats from Pacific Island Countries organized by the Foreign Service Institute and held in Palau in May 2015.

== See also ==
- Foreign relations of India
- Foreign relations of Palau
