= Federated States of Micronesia–Palau relations =

Micronesia–Palau relations

- Federated States of Micronesia: Palau

The Federated States of Micronesia and Palau share very good relations, as they are both bound by Compacts of Free Association with the United States. Palau decided not to join Micronesia when it became independent in 1986, due to language and other cultural differences. Palau became independent in 1994. Micronesian citizens may stay one year in Palau without a visa and a Palauan citizen may stay in Micronesia indefinitely without a visa. The two countries support each other as well as the United States and the Marshall Islands, another country in free association with the United States. The two countries also often support Israel, similar to the United States and the Marshall Islands.
