= Marshall Islands–Palau relations =

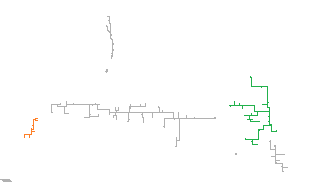

- Marshall Islands: Palau

The Marshall Islands and Palau share very good relations, as they are both bound by Compacts of Free Association with the United States. Marshall Islands citizens may stay one year in Palau without a visa and a Palauan citizen may stay in the Marshall Islands indefinitely without a visa. The two countries support each other as well as the United States and Micronesia, another country in free association with the United States.
